= Jack Kerouac bibliography =

Jack Kerouac (March 12, 1922 – October 21, 1969) was an American novelist and poet. He is considered a literary iconoclast and, alongside William S. Burroughs and Allen Ginsberg, a pioneer of the Beat Generation. Kerouac is recognized for his method of spontaneous prose. Thematically, his work covers topics such as Catholic spirituality, jazz, promiscuity, Buddhism, drugs, poverty, and travel. Kerouac used the name "Duluoz Legend" to refer to his collected autobiographical works.

== Fiction ==
Published during Kerouac's lifetime

- The Town and the City (written 1946–1949; published 1950)
- On the Road (written 1951; published 1957)
- The Subterraneans (written 1953; published 1958)
- The Dharma Bums (written November 1957; published 1958)
- Doctor Sax (written June 1952; published 1959)
- Maggie Cassidy (written Jan. 2, 1953; published 1959)
- Tristessa (written summer 1955 and fall 1956; published 1960)
- Book of Dreams (written 1952–1960; published 1960)
- Big Sur (written October 1961; published 1962)
- Visions of Gerard (written January 1956; published 1963)
- Desolation Angels (written fall 1956 and summer 1961; published 1965)
- Vanity of Duluoz (written 1967; published 1968)

Posthumous fiction

- Atop an Underwood: Early Stories and Other Writings (1936–1943; published 1999)
- The Sea Is My Brother (written 1942; first published in Slovak translation 2010 Bratislava, Slovakia, European Union: Artfórum)
- The Haunted Life and Other Writings, Novel (written 1944; published 2014)
- Orpheus Emerged, novella (written 1944–1945; published 2000)
- And the Hippos Were Boiled in Their Tanks, with William S. Burroughs (written 1945; published 2008)
- La vie est d'hommage, edition of all previously unpublished French writings, includes some non-fiction (written 1950–1965; published 2016)
- The Unknown Kerouac: Rare, Unpublished & Newly Translated Writings (1946–1968; published 2016)
- Visions of Cody (written 1951–1952; excerpts published December 1959; novel published 1972)
- Pic (written 1951 and 1969, published 1971)

== Poetry ==
- Mexico City Blues (1955; published 1959)
- Scattered Poems (1945–1968; published 1971) (includes the poem Pull My Daisy)
- Book of Sketches (1952–1957; published 2006)
- Old Angel Midnight (1956-1959; published 1973, republished in 2016 by City Lights)
- Trip Trap: Haiku on the Road from SF to NY (1959; published 1973) (with Albert Saijo and Lew Welch)
- Heaven and Other Poems (1957–1962; published 1977)
- San Francisco Blues (1954; published 1983)
- Pomes All Sizes (compiled 1960; published 1992)
- Book of Blues (1954–1961; published 1995)
- Book of Haikus (published 2003)
- Collected Poems (published 2012, volume 231 in Library of America) ISBN 9781598531947

== Other work and non-fiction ==
- Good Blonde & Others (1955; published 1993)
- Wake Up: A Life of the Buddha (1955; published 2008)
- Some of the Dharma (1953–1956; published 1997)
- The Scripture of the Golden Eternity (1956; published 1960) (meditations, koans, poems)
- Beat Generation, play (1957, published 2005)
- Lonesome Traveler (1960)
- Satori in Paris (1966)

== Letters, journals, interviews ==
- Dear Carolyn: Letters to Carolyn Cassady (1983) (1000 copies Edited By Arthur and Kit Knight) ISBN 0-934660-06-9
- Charters, Ann, ed. (1995). Jack Kerouac : selected letters, 1940–1956. New York: Viking. ISBN 9780670849574.
- Jack Kerouac: Selected Letters, 1957-1969
- Windblown World: The Journals of Jack Kerouac (1947–1954)
- Safe In Heaven Dead (1990) (Interview fragments published by Hanuman Books)
- Conversations with Jack Kerouac (Interviews)
- Empty Phantoms (Interviews)
- Departed Angels: The Lost Paintings
- Door Wide Open (2000) (by Joyce Johnson. Includes letters from Jack Kerouac)
- Jack Kerouac and Allen Ginsberg: The Letters (2010)

== Collections ==
- Charters, Ann, ed. (1995). The portable Jack Kerouac. New York: Viking. ISBN 9780670849574.
- Desolation Peak: Collected Writings (1956; published 2022)

== Discography ==
- Poetry for the Beat Generation (1959) (LP)
- Blues and Haikus (1959) (LP)
- Readings by Jack Kerouac on the Beat Generation (1960) (LP)
- The Jack Kerouac Collection (1990) [Box] (Audio CD Collection of 3 LPs)
- The Jack Kerouac Romnibus(1995) (a multimedia CD-ROM project coupled with a book) (Ralph Lombreglia and Kate Bernhardt)
- Jack Kerouac Reads On the Road (1999) (Audio CD)
- Doctor Sax and the Great World Snake (2003) (Play Adaptation with Audio CD)

== Filmography ==
Year	Title	Notes
1959	Pull My Daisy	Short film
