= Desolation Angels (novel) =

1965 novel by Jack Kerouac

- First US edition
- Author: Jack Kerouac
- Language: English
- Series: Duluoz Legend
- Publisher: Coward McCann
- Publication date: 1965
- Publication place: United States
- Media type: Print (hardback & paperback)
- Pages: 366 pg
- Preceded by: Visions of Gerard (1963)
- Followed by: Satori in Paris (1966)

Desolation Angels is a semi-autobiographical novel written by Beat Generation author Jack Kerouac, which makes up part of his Duluoz Legend. It was published in 1965, but was written years earlier, around the time On the Road was in the process of publication. The events described in the novel take place from 1956-1957. Much of the psychological struggle which the novel's protagonist, Jack Duluoz, undergoes in the novel reflects Kerouac's own increasing disenchantment with the Buddhist philosophy. Throughout the novel, Kerouac discusses his disenchantment with fame, and complicated feelings towards the Beat Generation. He also discusses his relationship with his mother and his friends (and prominent Beat figures) such as Allen Ginsberg, Neal Cassady, Lucienn Carr and William S. Burroughs. The novel is also notable for being a relatively positive portrayal of homosexuality and homosexual characters, despite its use of words that were at the time considered homophobic slurs.

== Character key ==
All of Kerouac's Duluoz legend's characters were based on others that were present within his life, and Desolation Angels is no exception.

"Because of the objections of my early publishers I was not allowed to use the same personae names in each work."

— Jack Kerouac, Visions of Cody

| Real-life person | Character name |
|---|---|
| Jack Kerouac | Jack Duluoz |
| William S. Burroughs | Bull Hubbard |
| Lucien Carr | Julien Love |
| Carolyn Cassady | Evelyn |
| Neal Cassady | Cody Pomeray |
| Mary Carney | Maggie Cassidy |
| Gregory Corso | Raphael Urso |
| Henri Cru | Deni Bleu |
| Claude Dalenburg | Paul |
| Robert Duncan | Geoffrey Donald |
| Bill Garver | Old Bull Gaines |
| Allen Ginsberg | Irwin Garden |
| Louis Ginsberg | Harry Garden |
| Joyce Glassman / Joyce Johnson | Alyce Newman |
| Randall Jarrell | Varnum Random |
| Philip Lamantia | David D'Angeli |
| Robert LaVigne | Levesque |
| Elise Cowen | Barbara Lipp |
| Helen Weaver | Ruth Heaper |
| Helen Elliott | Ruth Erickson |
| Norman Mailer | Harvey Marker |
| Michael McClure | Patrick McLear |
| Locke McCorkle | Kevin McLoch |
| John Montgomery | Alex Fairbrother |
| Peter Orlovsky | Simon Darlovsky |
| Lafcadio Orlovsky | Lazarus Darlovsky |
| Nicki Orlovsky | Tony Darlovsky |
| Alan Watts | Alex Aums |
| Phillip Whalen | Ben Fagan |
| Gary Snyder | Jarry Wagner |
| William Carlos Williams | Dr. Williams |

Kerouac was not particularly conscientious about masking the identities of his friends in this work. In Chapter 43 of Book 1, he refers to "...the Sundays in Neal Cassady's writings..." The editors may have ignored this, since it refers to Neal as a writer instead of a friend. In Chapter 80, the discussion of the meanings of Urso and Pomeray's names leads to an unclear comparison to the name Corso.

Partway through Chapter 91 of Book 1, there is the line, "'Who wants to ride freight trains!' -Gregory- 'I dont dig all this crap where you ride freight trains and have to exchange butts with bums-'". Somehow both Kerouac and the editors missed that "Gregory" was not changed to "Raphael". Similarly, the locals of Tangiers call Old Bull Hubbard (Burroughs) "Boorows" in Chapter 52 of Book 2.

In Chapter 5 of Book 2 the proprietor of a corner store in Tangiers is said to call Old Bull Gaines (Garver) "Senor Gahr-va".

Interestingly, multiple books or poems written by the characters were based on real-life books, written by the character's real-life counterpart. For example, Kerouac's On the Road is referred to as "Road [by Jack Duluoz]", William S. Burroughs' Naked Lunch is referred to as "Nude Breakfast [by Bull Hubbard]", and Allen Ginsberg's Howl is referred to as "Howling [by Irwin Garden]"

There is also a reference to the Burroughs Adding Machine Computer, which was invented by Burroughs' Grandfather, on the final page of Book 2, Part Two. The trust-fund money that Burroughs lives off of in Tangiers comes from this invention.

== Plot ==
Desolation Angels follows the travels of Jack Duluoz and contains two books, totaling six parts all-together. Book 1: Desolation Angels contains Part One: Desolation in Solitude and Part Two: Desolation in the World, totaling 102 chapters. Book 2: Passing Through contains Part One: Passing Through Mexico, Part Two: Passing Through New York, Part Three: Passing through Tangiers, France and London, and Part Four: Passing Through America Again, coming to a total of 84 chapters.

The novel's events take place from 1956-1957, and depict Kerouac's life after the events of The Dharma Bums, immediately before the publication of On The Road, through the character Jack Duluoz. Throughout the novel, Kerouac's group of friends are referred to as "The Desolation Angels", regardless of how many people are present at any time. Since all the characters names are often considered pseudonyms for the people that inspired them, they will largely be referred to in this article using their real world names.

=== Book One: Desolation Angels ===
==== Part One: Desolation in Solitude ====
According to the book's foreword, the opening section of the novel is taken almost directly from the journal he kept when he was a fire lookout on Desolation Peak in the North Cascade mountains of Washington state. Another account of this time was published in Kerouac's 1960 book of sketches and essays Lonesome Traveler.

The first section, typed up in Mexico in 1956, depicts Jack Kerouac's time as a fire lookout on Desolation Peak during the summer of 1956, beginning almost immediately after the conclusion of the events in Kerouac's 1959 novel The Dharma Bums. While the stay was initially spiritually fulfilling, Kerouac describes the negative effects of his two-month solitude in lines such as “Many's the time I thought I'd die of boredom or jump off the mountain,”. He spends his time playing card games of his own creation, scribbling in notebooks, unsuccessfully attempting to quit smoking and listening to the chatter of other lookouts over the radio.

Book One, Part One is notable for its description of Kerouac's interest in Zen Buddhism, and his anxiety over his mother growing old, his age and his future as a writer (The Town and the City had been published 6 years earlier, and On the Road would be published the following year). He muses on his spirituality and his past, mentioning that he could have married "Maggie Cassidy", a character with a prominent role in the novel of the same name, who is based on Kerouac's high-school girlfriend Mary Carney. Kerouac is largely the only character, with other characters such as "Irwin Garden" (real name Allen Ginsberg), "Cody Pomeray" (Neal Cassady), or "Bull Hubbard" (William S. Burroughs) mentioned briefly. Part One also contains many depictions of Kerouac's sexual fantasies, or ideal women.

As the fire season draws to a close, and fewer lookouts are needed, Kerouac leaves Desolation Peak after 63 days, with his mind "in rags".

==== Part Two: Desolation in the World ====
The novel's second section contains Jack Kerouac's hike down Desolation Peak, and his return to society, and hitchhiking his way to San Francisco. He struggles to return to society, feeling sickened by the unfamiliar smell of fresh ink on a newspaper. While in San Francisco, he reunites with his friends, such as Allen Ginsberg, Neal Cassady and "Simon Darlovsky" (Peter Orlovsky). Kerouac describes mixed feelings about whether to live a life of solitude, or to return to society with his friends. His disenchantment with Buddhism becomes more obvious, and he increases his consumption of drugs and alcohol. He is gifted a crucifix necklace by Raphael (Gregory Corso), and wonders "'What would Christians and Catholics say about me wearing the cross to ball and to drink like this?'" Kerouac would later publicly somewhat readopt the Catholic faith of his upbringing, stating "All I write about is Jesus" in 1968, but throughout his life he had a complicated relationship with Christianity. Book One, Part Two is significantly longer than other parts of the novel, possibly since Kerouac wished to have the first book published as its own separate novel

Jack Duluoz's musings reflect Kerouac's own introspection and questioning of his own beliefs, relationships and his life's trajectory during 1956, exploring his affections for, and frustrations with, his friends.

=== Book Two: Passing Through ===
==== Part One: Passing Through Mexico ====
The shortest part of all, Book Two, Part One describes Jack Kerouac's time in Mexico in September 1956. Kerouac stays with friend Old Bull Gaines (Bill Garver), a 60-year-old heroin addict and petty thief. Kerouac jumps forward in time for a moment in Book Two, Part One, Chapter 8 to explain his frustrations with fame and press attention. Kerouac stayed in Mexico in an attempt to increase his creative output. This attempt succeeds, as he writes "...a whole novel, finished another, and wrote a whole book of poetry." This likely refers to how Kerouac wrote the entirety of Book One: Desolation Angels, and finished writing Tristessa while in Mexico. Kerouac's friends, such as Allen Ginsberg, Gregory Corso and Peter Orlovsky and his brother, "Lazarus Darlovsky" (Lafcadio Orlovsky) then join him, which both excited and frustrates Kerouac. Kerouac discusses Allen Ginsberg's homosexuality openly through the character Irwin Garden, and defends homosexuality, particularly Queer authors. Kerouac had a complicated relationship with his own sexuality, and here takes care to specifically state that he is "a non-queer".

Kerouac and his friends decide to return to the United States, and visit New York, as described in Book Two Part Two.

==== Part Two: Passing Through New York ====
Consisting largely of travel through the United States, as well as time spent in New York and Washington, DC in 1956, Part Two begins with Jack Kerouac, Allen Ginsberg and the Orlovsky Brothers making their way to New York, leaving Garver in Mexico, despite his protestations and grief at being left alone. They are driven out of Mexico by a man named Norman (no last name is given), crossing the border into Texas and spending time sleeping in the car or in sleeping bags. Kerouac and Lafcadio share a sleeping bag. The Desolation Angels travel through the United States, drinking and arguing. When arriving in New York, they meet Ruth Erickson (real name Helen Elliot) and her roommate Ruth Heaper (Helen Weaver), who are both described as incredibly beautiful. Kerouac moves in with Weaver, and they have a relationship from 1956-57. Kerouac claims he felt like marrying her. In this part of the novel, Kerouac describes women in general in a derogatory manner, reducing them to little more than objects of desire for men.

Helen Elliot confesses feelings for Julien Love (Lucien Carr), who had earlier had unrequited feelings for her, but was now married. Kerouac meets up with Carr, and discusses a number of the interactions they have had. Kerouac and Carr visit Weaver's house, where Kerouac is living, and upon seeing him drunk, Weaver begins to beat Kerouac, pulling out his hair and punching him repeatedly, leading to Carr nicknaming her "Slugger".

Kerouac is gifted a large coat by his friend "Deni Bleu" (Henri Cru), which he wears with Ginsberg and Orlovsky to meet Salvador Dali. As Christmas 1956 approaches, Kerouac leaves to visit his mother Gabrielles-Ange Kerouac. Before making the journey south however, he visits Gregory Corso in DC, smoking cannabis and drinking heavily. After falling asleep on the bus, Kerouac's pack appears stolen, and with it is his novel Angels of Desolation (a working title for what would become Desolation Angels), his book of poetry, and an early version of Tristessa, along with his gear and some clothing. This loss moves Kerouac to tears. After entering a brief state of suicidal depression and considering the nature of God, it is revealed that Kerouac's bag has been shipped to his destination ahead of him, much to his relief.

Kerouac describes Christmas and New Year's celebrations with his mother, with whom he shared a complex, co-dependent, and often disturbing relationship. Promising to return in the fall to help her move to her own house, he leaves again for New York. She warns him that his friends, particularly Ginsberg and Burroughs were "...going to destroy [him]!", a sentiment that his father shared prior to his death.

Meanwhile in New York, Gregory Corso is sleeping with Helen Weaver, or so Kerouac believes. Upon returning to New York, Kerouac discovers that Ginsberg has arranged for Kerouac and other Beat Generation figures to be photographed together for Life Magazine, which frustrates Kerouac, who attends the photoshoot intoxicated. Weaver breaks up with Kerouac, apparently upon the advice of her psychoanalyst, who views their relationship as harmful for her psyche. Weaver explains that her psychoanalyst believes that Kerouac has taken advantage of her, and affected her ability to get adequate rest. Kerouac replies by accusing the psychoanalyst of trying to seduce Weaver himself. Kerouac is then introduced to "Alyce Newman", real name Joyce Glassman, with whom he begins what he describes as "...perhaps the best love affair I ever had". Glassman is a renowned author, and her romance with Kerouac came right at the beginning of her career. Despite her reputation as a feminist writer, Kerouac claims that Glassman offered to dye her hair, to satisfy his dislike of blondes. Kerouac meets Weaver again while drunk in a bar, and she attempts to persuade him to spend the night with her, an idea which he appears apprehensive towards. Glassman suddenly arrives at the bar, and takes the intoxicated Kerouac home.

Kerouac describes his relationship with Glassman incredibly warmly, despite his somewhat patronizing attitude to her writing. He views her literary models as "wrong", but still believes she could be "the first great woman writer of the world", despite the number of notable female authors already published by the 1950s. Glassman's best friend, "Barbara Lipp", real name Elise Cowen, is described as being still in love with Ginsberg, following their relationship in 1953.

Ginsberg and Kerouac discuss Kerouac's upcoming trip to Tangiers to visit Burroughs, and Ginsberg's romantic feelings for his life-partner Orlovsky. They bump into Cowen, and although their discussion is not described in much detail, they appear to make amicable humorous conversation for an extended period of time. Kerouac buys a ticket to Tangiers on a Yugoslavian ship, visits Carr again, and shares a beer with Glassman, who is hurt by his departure and concerned about his alcohol abuse, before beginning his trip.

==== Part Three: Passing Through Tangiers, France and London ====
Part Three begin depicts Jack Kerouac's time in Morocco, the impact that typing up Naked Lunch had on his psyche and his travels through France and London. The travel was also depicted in Lonesome Traveler, in the section Big Trip To Europe.

While staying with William S. Burroughs in Tangiers, Kerouac witnesses Burroughs refer to Arabic people as "little pricks" regularly.

"But by the next day I realized everybody was a little prick: - me, Irwin [Allen], himself [Burroughs], the Arabs, the women, the merchants, the President of the USA and Ali Baba himself... I realized it was just an expression..."

Kerouac notes Burroughs' fitness, which is especially notable when considering Burroughs' opiate addiction, as depicted in his semi-autobiographical novel Junky. The pair spend time ingesting various forms of cannabis, abusing opiates, and visiting gay bars. Kerouac describes typing up Burroughs' Naked Lunch as an experience with somewhat traumatic effects. Kerouac attributes at least a week of nightmares to his exposure to the disturbing imagery in Burroughs' influential novel. Interestingly, Allen Ginsberg's contributions to the typing of Naked Lunch are not mentioned, despite the fact that he fulfilled a similar role to Kerouac. However, Burroughs' intense romantic feelings towards Ginsberg are described, particularly when Burroughs breaks down in tears on Kerouac's shoulder while waiting for Ginsberg to arrive. Kerouac then goes on to describe an experience where he and Burroughs ingested excessive amounts of opium in various states. Ginsberg and his partner Peter Orlovsky arrive in Tangiers, causing Kerouac to become withdrawn due to his apathy towards his friends and disenchantment with his life in general. Despite this, the four of them explore the city together.

In Chapter 58, Kerouac flashes-forward and describes his disenchantment with the yet-unnamed Beat Generation, which would come to a head in the years following the publication of On the Road. He describes his frustration with how the concept of "coolness" will soon become a mass-marketed fad, or a set of rules for socially-posturing middleclass youth, as opposed to the "natural quietness" of Ginsberg's, or Burroughs' cool. Kerouac purchases tickets to Europe from a friend at a party.

Kerouac arrives in France, meeting Gregory Corso in Paris. Kerouac writes about his perceptions of the romance of France and the women of Paris, again using reductive stereotypes. After spending little more than 3 pages describing his time in France, Kerouac travels to England.

After some difficulty getting into England, Kerouac arrives in London in the evening and visits a bar called "Shakespeare", which he strongly dislikes due to its somewhat aristocratic décor. He visits Chelsea and searches for a place to stay in Soho, which he calls "the Greenwich Village of London." He notices members of the mid-20th century sub-culture, known as Teddy Boys, and refers to them as "dandies." He stays in a cheap room in Piccadilly Circus ("the Times Square of London"), and notices London's large feline population, applauding the city's apparent affection for cats. He walks about one evening looking for 221B Baker Street, before remembering that Sherlock Holmes was a fictional character. He buys a ticket to New York on the Dutch ship SS Nieuw Amsterdam, and ships out.

Kerouac felt that his European trip had come at a time at his life when he responded to new experiences with apprehension or disgust, and that mindset may have been a factor in why his journey was so short.

==== Part Four: Passing Through America Again ====
Part Four begins with Jack Kerouac's journey across the Atlantic back to the USA, and depicts his excitement at returning to his home country. Kerouac is almost moved to tear by the sight of a can of Campbell's Pork and Bean soup, and the American meals it symbolizes to him. Once he arrives in new York, he travels south to collect his mother Gabrielles Ange Kerouac, stopping to reunite for two days with Joyce Johnson. He travels with his mother to California via Mexico, a journey which takes up most of the final section of the novel. Kerouac's mother packs her sewing basket, her salt and pepper shaker and a photo album for their trip.

Kerouac devotes chapters 64 and 65 to literary sketches of his mother, and defends his relationship with her against "Freudian" implications (Kerouac was particularly sensitive to allegations of having an Oedipus Complex), and discusses his intense love for the woman he describes as "the most important person in this whole story, and the best."

Kerouac and Gabrielles travel through Florida, Texas, Louisiana and even visit Mexico, sharing drinks and sleeping on buses. Kerouac documents her first time visiting Mexico, particularly impactfully describing how moved she was by a lone young Mexican woman dressed in black, bringing her infant child to the altar of a Catholic church. This image would stay with her for the rest of her life. After their time in Mexico, they travel through Arizona and arrive in San Francisco, California, where Gabrielles remarks that they have no plans and little money, to which Kerouac replies that rent in California can be relatively cheap.

Kerouac and "Ben Fagan" (Phillip Whalen) whom Kerouac describes as "an old Grandpaw", spend time together, meeting with "Alex Fairbrother" (John Montgomery). Kerouac continues to drink, and provides "Cody Pomeray", real name Neal Cassady, with $10 for "an urgent pot connection." In meta style, Kerouac receives advance copies of his novel On the Road, giving a copy to Neal, "the hero of the poor crazy sad book." Kerouac describes Cassady's 1958 arrest for offering to share a small amount of marijuana to undercover agents, for which he served 2 years. Kerouac and Gabrielle catch a Greyhound bus back to Florida. Gabrielle stays a few blocks away from her daughter Caroline Kerouac's house in Florida.

Kerouac journeys on to Mexico City again, and is upset to discover that Garver had died since he left Mexico in the beginning of Book Two, Part Two. Desolation Angels concludes with Kerouac briefly describing being back in New York at an unknown time, with Ginsberg, Orlovsky, and Corso, now that they are famous writers after the publication of works such as On the Road and Howl.

"...and so I told my Desolation Angels goodbye. A new life for me"

— Jack Kerouac, Desolation Angels, Book Two, Part Four, Chapter 84

== Style ==
Desolation Angels is one of the longest examples of Kerouac's style of spontaneous prose at 366 pages. As with most of Kerouac's work, Desolation Angels is long-form prose poetry composed as a memoir-novel. Kerouac used the style of spontaneous prose in most of his books, such as The Subterraneans, Maggie Cassidy and On the Road, amongst others in the Duluoz Legend.

The novel follows an atypical chapter structure, with "chapters" ranging from small paragraphs (i.e. Book 1 Chapter 9, which is a single line) to numerous pages. Book One contains many haiku or senryū inspired poems, often at the end of a chapter, although they do not follow the typical structure of the form, besides from often having 3 lines.

The book is broken up into two sections called Desolation Angels and Passing Through, which are then subdivided into many shorter parts. Each part focuses on a specific location where Kerouac is at that time. The foreword of the book mentions that Kerouac was hoping to get the second section, Passing Through, published as a standalone novel.

== References in popular culture ==
- Bad Company's 1979 album Desolation Angels was named after this novel.
- Kathy Acker's novel Kathy Goes to Haiti references this book.
- The Austin, Texas-based country band Reckless Kelly has a song titled "Desolation Angels".
- "Desolation Row", by Bob Dylan, is said to have gotten its title from this novel, and features the line "the perfect image of a priest", which Dylan quoted from this novel.
- Roger Daltrey mentions the book on his solo album Parting Must be Painless on the Steve Swindells' song "Dont Wait on the Stairs"
- The name of alt. folk group Mt Desolation, featuring members of The Killers, Keane, Mumford and Sons, and Noah and the Whale, is based on this book and Desolation Peak.
- Passion Pit's song "Sleepyhead" samples a quote from this novel.
- T. Rex's song "Rock On" from the album The Slider features the line "Desolation Angel on the cover of my paper, loves everyone, everyone.".
- Everybody Wants Some, a 2016 film by Richard Linklater, shows a character reading the book.
- Patti Smith's song "1959" references the book with the lines, "Wisdom was a teapot pouring from above. Desolation Angels served it up with love."
