= Claude Dalenberg =

Zen priest

Claude Dalenberg (also known as Ananda Claude Dalenberg) (July 2, 1927 — February 18, 2008) was a Zen priest ordained by Shunryū Suzuki and a dharma successor of Tenshin Reb Anderson.

== Biography ==
Dalenberg was born on July 2, 1927, in South Holland, Illinois. Growing up in a Dutch-Reformist environment, he attended Sunday school, catechism classes, Sunday morning and evening services.

After serving in the Navy, Dalenberg enrolled in Northwestern University in the School of Engineering. Dalenberg initially discovered Buddhism after attending a talk by Alan Watts in Chicago in 1949. Dalenberg eventually graduated Northwestern with a degree in Philosophy.

After moving to California in the 1950s, Dalenberg began attending the American Academy of Asian Studies where he met D.T. Suzuki, Gary Snyder and others who deepened his interest in Buddhism. Dalenberg was a member of a zazenkai group with Snyder, Philip Whalen, Albert Saijo, and Lew Welch. He studied with Nyogen Senzaki in Los Angeles as well as with Hodo Tobase at Sokoji in San Francisco.

In the mid-1960s, Dalenberg met Shunryū Suzuki and began studying with him, eventually becoming a Senior Priest at the San Francisco Zen Center.

Dalenberg enjoyed learning from other Buddhist sects and often attended services at a Buddhist Churches of America branch near Sokoji. He was also involved with Quakers and worked with them towards prison abolition.

He served as President of the Buddhist Council of Northern California and helped establish the East-West House in San Francisco.

Dalenberg appeared under the pseudonym "Bud Diefendorf" in Jack Kerouac's novel The Dharma Bums.
