= Book of Haikus =

Book by Jack Kerouac

- First edition
- Author: Jack Kerouac
- Language: English
- Series: Penguin Poets
- Genre: Poetry
- Publisher: Penguin Group
- Publication date: 2003
- Publication place: United States
- Media type: Print (paperback)
- Pages: 200
- ISBN: 978-0-14-200264-3
- OCLC: 50503314
- Dewey Decimal: 811/.54 21
- LC Class: PS3521.E735 B66 2003

Book of Haikus is a collection of haiku poetry by Jack Kerouac. It was first published in 2003 and edited by Regina Weinreich. It consists of some 500 poems selected from a corpus of nearly 1,000 haiku jotted down by Kerouac in small notebooks.

Although most of the poetry in Book of Haikus is original, some haiku are paraphrased in Kerouac's prose works:

The top of Jack
Mountain—done in
By golden clouds

also recurs in The Dharma Bums. The collection also contains a handful of haiku published earlier, for instance in Scattered Poems.
