= Lonesome Traveler =

1960 collection of nonfiction essays by Jack Kerouac

Lonesome Traveller
- First edition
- Author: Jack Kerouac
- Illustrator: Larry Rivers
- Language: English
- Publisher: McGraw Hill
- Publication date: 1960
- Publication place: United States
- Media type: Print (hardback & paperback)
- Pages: 184
- OCLC: 20673830
- Preceded by: Tristessa (1960)
- Followed by: Book of Dreams (1960)/Big Sur (1962)

Lonesome Traveler is a non-fiction collection of short essays and sketches by American novelist and poet Jack Kerouac, published in 1960. It is a compilation of Kerouac's journal entries about traveling the United States, Mexico, Morocco, the United Kingdom and France, and covers similar issues to his novels, such as relationships, various jobs, and the nature of his life on the road. Some of the stories originally appeared as magazine articles.

== Details ==
The collection is Kerouac's first undisguisedly autobiographical work written in his spontaneous prose style. "Mexico Fellaheen" and "The Railroad Earth" (also known as "October in the Railroad Earth"), together with his travel journal entries, produce a loose but effective collection.

"Alone on a Mountaintop" recounts Kerouac's three-month stay on Desolation Peak as a lone fire lookout, which is also described (although somewhat differently) in The Dharma Bums and Part One of Desolation Angels.

Similarly, "Big Trip to Europe" depicts Kerouac's 1957 trip to various European countries, as in Part Three of Desolation Angels.

"New York Scenes" makes reference to a "Robert De Niro," which is Robert De Niro Sr. not his son Robert De Niro.

The book begins with Kerouac's answers to a publisher's questionnaire, about his life and work.

== Stories included ==
- "Piers of the Homeless Night" (Full-text at publishers website)
- "Mexico Fellaheen"
- "The Railroad Earth"
- "Slobs of the Kitchen Sea"
- "New York Scenes"
- "Alone on a Mountaintop"
- "Big Trip to Europe"
- "The Vanishing American Hobo"

== Sources ==
- Kerouac, Jack (1960). Lonesome Traveler. Grove Press. ISBN 978-0-8021-3074-7.
