= Orpheus Emerged =

2000 novella by Jack Kerouac

- Author: Jack Kerouac
- Language: English
- Genre: Novel
- Publication date: 2000
- Publication place: United States
- Media type: Print (hardback & paperback)
- Pages: 176 pages
- ISBN: 1-59687-123-7
- OCLC: 62161491
- Preceded by: Good Blonde & Others (1993)
- Followed by: Book of Sketches (2006)

Orpheus Emerged is a novella written by Jack Kerouac in 1945 when he was at Columbia University. It was discovered after his death and published in 2000.

Orpheus Emerged chronicles the passions, conflicts, and dreams of a group of bohemians searching for truth while studying at a university. Kerouac wrote the story shortly after meeting Allen Ginsberg, William S. Burroughs, Lucien Carr, and others in and around Columbia University who would form the core of the Beats.
