= Satori in Paris =

1966 novella by Jack Kerouac

- First edition cover
- Author: Jack Kerouac
- Language: English
- Publisher: Grove Press
- Publication date: 1966
- Publication place: United States
- Media type: Print (hardback & paperback)
- Pages: 118 pp
- Preceded by: Desolation Angels (1965)
- Followed by: Vanity of Duluoz (1968)

Satori in Paris is a 1966 novella by American novelist and poet Jack Kerouac. It is a short, autobiographical tale of Kerouac's trip to Paris, then Brittany, to research his genealogy. Kerouac relates his trip in a tumbledown fashion as a lonesome traveler. Little is said about the research that he does, and much more about his interactions with the French people he meets.

== Editions ==
- 1966. Satori in Paris, ISBN 0-394-17437-2
- 1982. Satori in Paris, Granada Publishing, ISBN 0-586-05545-2
- 1988. Satori in Paris & Pic, ISBN 0-8021-3061-5
- 1991. Satori in Paris, Flamingo, ISBN 0-586-09118-1
