= Lew Welch =

American poet (1926–1971)

Lewis Barrett Welch Jr.
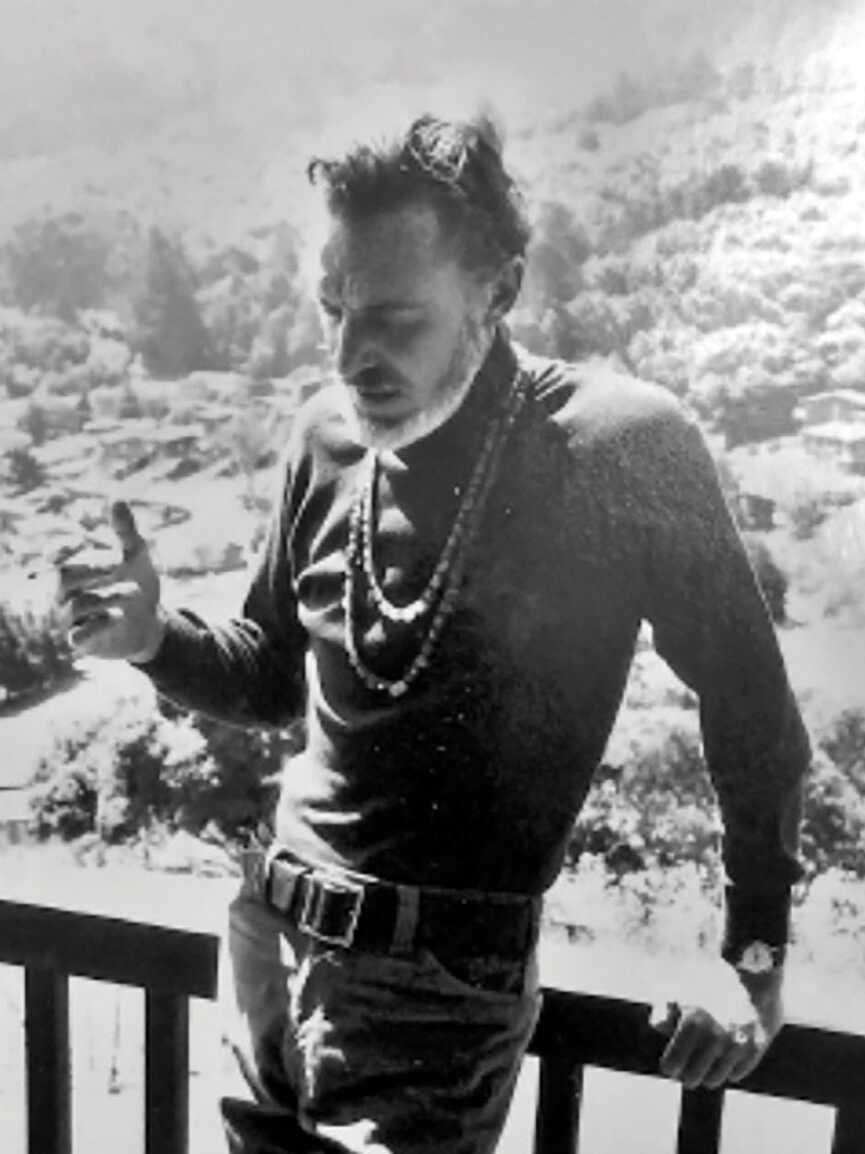
- Welch at his Marin City home in 1968
- Born: August 16, 1926; Phoenix, Arizona, U.S.
- Disappeared: May 23, 1971 (aged 44); Nevada City, California, U.S. 39.1541°N 121.17°W
- Occupation: Poet

Lewis Barrett Welch Jr. (August 16, 1926 – c. May 23, 1971) was an American poet associated with the Beat Generation literary movement.

Welch published and performed widely during the 1960s. He taught a poetry workshop as part of the University of California Extension in San Francisco, from 1965 to 1970.

He is believed to have committed suicide, after leaving a note on May 23, 1971. His body was never found.

== Early life ==
Welch was born in Phoenix, Arizona, and moved with his mother and sister to California in 1929. The family often moved, and he graduated from Palo Alto High School. He enlisted in the Army Air Forces in 1944 but never saw active service. He worked for a period before attending Stockton Junior College, where he developed an interest in the works of Gertrude Stein.

In 1948, Welch moved to Portland, Oregon, to attend Reed College. There he roomed with fellow poet Gary Snyder and also befriended Philip Whalen. Welch decided to become a writer after reading Gertrude Stein's long story "Melanctha." Welch wrote his thesis on Stein and published poems in student magazines. William Carlos Williams visited the college and met the three poets. He admired Welch's early poems and tried to get his Stein thesis published.

== New York and Chicago ==
After college, Welch moved to New York City, where he worked writing copy in the advertising industry. Welch was said to have come up with the advertising slogan "Raid Kills Bugs Dead," but some have questioned this claim. During this time, Welch started to display emotional and mental problems and went to Florida to take a course of therapy.

He then went to the University of Chicago, where he studied philosophy and English. In Chicago, he joined the advertising department of Montgomery Ward.

== Later life and work ==
Wanting to get back to poetry, Welch applied for a transfer to Montgomery Ward's Oakland headquarters. After the return to California, he started to get involved in the San Francisco literary scene. He soon gave up advertising and earned a living driving a cab while devoting more time to writing. He became an active participant in Beat culture, living at various times with Snyder and Lawrence Ferlinghetti. In 1960, poet Lenore Kandel met Welch and Snyder, who introduced her to many people in the Beat movement.

Jack Kerouac based his character Dave Wain in his novel Big Sur (1962) on Welch. In 1968, Welch signed the "Writers and Editors War Tax Protest" pledge, vowing to refuse tax payments in protest against the Vietnam War.

== Personal life ==
Welch had a common-law relationship with Polish refugee Maria Magdalena Cregg. He acted as the stepfather to her son Hugh Anthony Cregg III, better known by his stage-name Huey Lewis.

== Death ==
In the evening hours of May 23, 1971, Welch walked out of poet Gary Snyder's house in Nevada City. He left a note indicating he was committing suicide because he was depressed and thought of himself as a failure. The note was dated several months before the day of his disappearance. He was formally reported missing by members of the Ananda Cooperative commune.

His car was found abandoned 15 miles north of Nevada City near Tyler Road. He had with him a stainless steel Smith & Wesson .22 caliber revolver. A search was conducted in the area in which he had disappeared by the Nevada County Sheriff's Office and members of the Adanda commune. The search for Welch was officially called off by the sheriff's office on May 28, 1971. The Adana commune members continued searching for Welch until June 1, 1971.

His body has never been found.

== See also ==
- List of people who disappeared mysteriously (1970s)

== Bibliography ==
Note: Before committing suicide in 1971, Lew Welch left a note naming Donald Allen his literary executor. Donald Allen published much of Welch's work posthumously via Grey Fox Press.

- Trip Trap: Haiku on the Road (1973) (ISBN 0912516046) Jack Kerouac, Albert Saijo, and Lew Welch
- How I Work as a Poet (1973) (ISBN 0-912516-06-2)
- Selected Poems, with a preface by Gary Snyder (1976) (ISBN 0-912516-20-8)
- On Bread and Poetry: A Panel Discussion Between Gary Snyder, Lew Welch, and Philip Whalen (1977) (ISBN 0-912516-27-5)
- I, Leo: An Unfinished Novel (1977) (ISBN 0-912516-24-0)
- Ring of Bone: Collected Poems (1979) (ISBN 0-912516-03-8)
- I Remain – The Letters of Lew Welch & the Correspondence of His Friends (Volume 1: 1949–1960) (1980) (ISBN 0-912516-08-9)
- I Remain – The Letters of Lew Welch & the Correspondence of His Friends (Volume 2: 1960–1971) (1980) (ISBN 0-912516-42-9)
- How I Read Gertrude Stein (1995, originally written late-1940s) (ISBN 0-912516-23-2)
- Ring of Bone: Collected Poems (New & Expanded Edition) (2012) (ISBN 0-872865-79-7)
