= Albert Saijo =

American writer

- Born: February 4, 1926; Los Angeles, California
- Died: June 2, 2011 (aged 85); Volcano, Hawaii
- Education: University of Southern California
- Occupation: Poet
- Writing career
- Language: English
- Movement: Beat Generation

Albert Fairchild Saijo (February 4, 1926 – June 2, 2011) was a Japanese-American poet associated with the Beat Generation. He and his family were imprisoned as part of the United States government's internment of Japanese Americans during World War II, during which time he wrote editorials on his experiences of internment for his high school newspaper. Saijo went on to serve in the U.S. Army and study at the University of Southern California. Later he became associated with Beat Generation figures including Jack Kerouac, with whom he wrote, traveled and became friends.

Saijo's first solo collection of poetry, Outspeaks: A Rhapsody, was published in 1997. A second collection, Woodrat Flat, was published posthumously in 2015. Saijo was also the author of The Backpacker (1972), a short book on backpacking, and coauthor of Trip Trap (1972), a collection of haiku written with Jack Kerouac and Lew Welch. Saijo died in 2011 in Hawaii, where he had lived since the 1990s.

== Early life and family ==
Saijo was born in Los Angeles, California on February 4, 1926, to Satoru and Asano Miyata Saijo. His parents were Issei, first-generation immigrants to the United States.

His father, Satoru, was born in 1878 in Kumamoto Prefecture, and immigrated to the U.S. in 1900. Satoru was bilingual and had been educated in Japan and the United States; in the U.S. he worked as a domestic servant before attending Kenyon Theological Seminary at Kenyon College and Drew Theological Seminary at Drew University. He was employed in Cleveland, Ohio by Albert Fairchild Holden, after whom he later named his second son, Albert Fairchild. Satoru was active in the International Church of the Foursquare Gospel, and later started his own congregation, but left the church in the 1930s to become a poultry farmer.

Saijo's mother, Asano, was born in 1893 and arrived in the U.S. as a picture bride in 1921. She was raised as a Buddhist. In Los Angeles she taught Japanese, worked as a columnist for the Japanese newspapers Rafu Shimpo and Kashu Mainichi, and participated in haiku poetry groups. Saijo had an older brother, Gompers, born 1922, and a younger sister, Hisayo, born 1928. The three children were raised bilingual.

== Internment and early writing ==
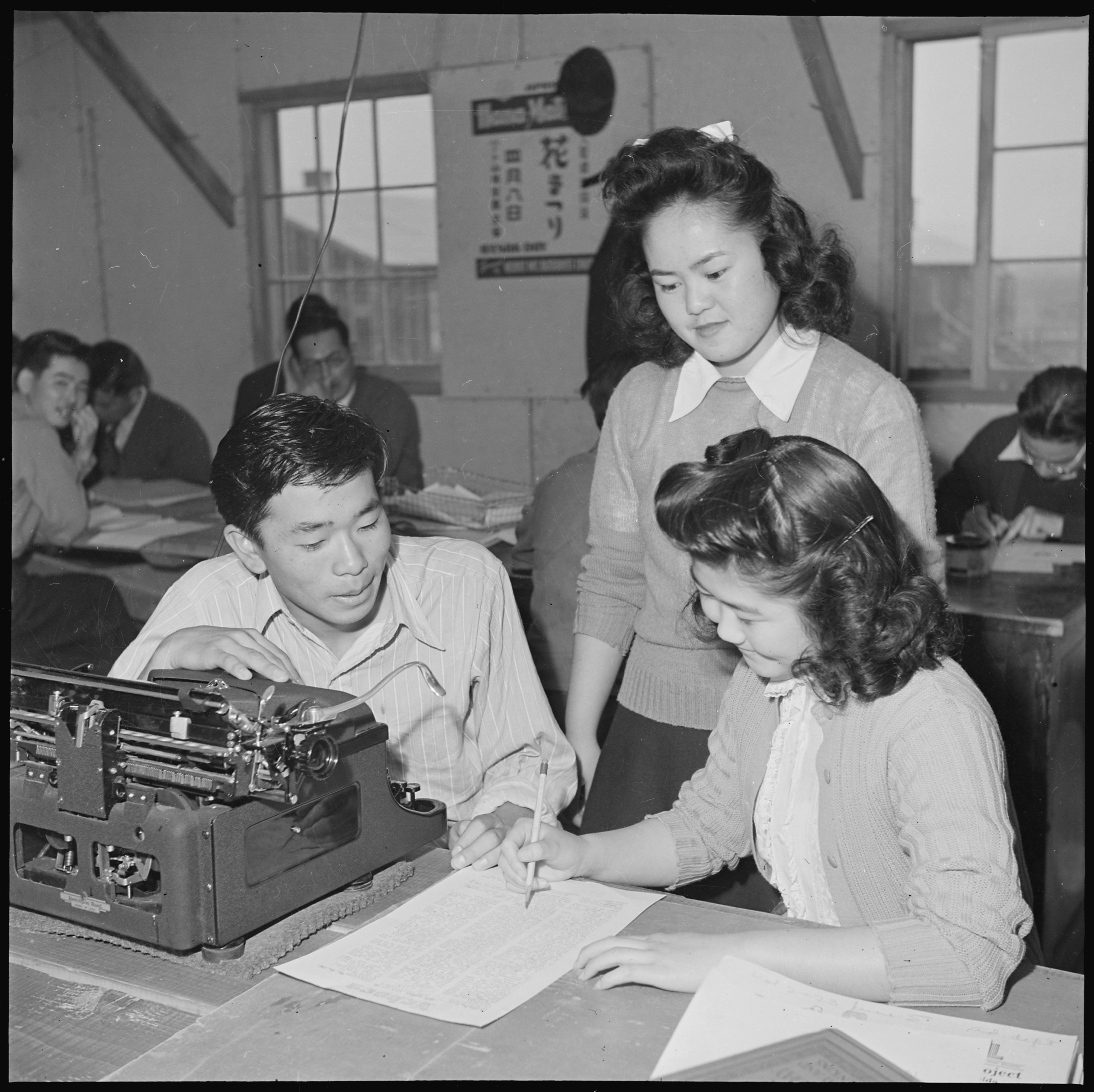
Saijo (left) at Heart Mountain Relocation Center in 1943

In 1942, when Saijo was 15 years old, he and his family were removed from their California home and imprisoned at Pomona Assembly Center, then transferred to Heart Mountain Relocation Center, as part of the U.S. government's program of Japanese American internment. While at Heart Mountain Saijo attended high school and worked as a janitor. In 1942, Saijo began to write for his high school newspaper, the Heart Mountain Echoes. His first feature article, entitled "Me and December 7", was published on the first anniversary of the 1941 Attack on Pearl Harbor, and addressed his memories of shock and disorientation surrounding the attack, and his fears that he would be treated differently by non-Japanese friends and teachers as a result. The article also argued against the significance of race and expressed opposition to the Nazi theory of the master race. In his writing of this period, Saijo expressed a commitment to the United States as a melting pot and support for those who volunteered for the U.S. Armed Forces. The historian Michael Masatsugu has argued that while Saijo did challenge the racial essentialist construction of Japanese Americans that was used to justify their internment, his arguments regarding the irrelevance of race and his call for Japanese Americans to assimilate were consistent with the approach of the War Relocation Authority (WRA). Masatsugu observes that this was not a coincidence: Saijo and other writers were supervised by WRA officials, and Masatsugu argues that this supervision was a form of surveillance and censorship.

Saijo's later editorials and features criticized the injustice of internment. These included "Christmas, 1942", which recounted his experience of his first Christmas at Heart Mountain. He was more explicit in a March 1943 editorial, in which he associated internment with imprisonment and suggested that it was driven by discrimination. Later in 1943 the Echoes, under Saijo's editorship, called on Japanese Americans to give their backing to Gordon Hirabayashi's legal challenge to internment (see Hirabayashi v. United States).

He later remembered internment as an "adventure", but also as causing the break-up of his immediate family as he and his siblings began to spend more time with their peers. Saijo was part of an early-leave program that commenced before the camps were closed; through a War Relocation Authority program he moved to Ann Arbor, Michigan, where he hoped to attend the University of Michigan but instead took a job in a cafeteria.

He was eventually drafted, and served in the 100th Battalion of the 442nd Regimental Combat Team. He trained in Hattiesburg, Mississippi, and served in Italy during the post-war occupation. While serving he contracted tuberculosis, which continued to trouble him for the following 20 years.

Funded by the G.I. Bill, Saijo attended the University of Southern California (USC) and earned a bachelor's degree in International Relations with a minor in Chinese. He entered USC's graduate program and began work on a thesis on the 1954 partition of Vietnam. Throughout his life Saijo remained in contact with those he had met at Heart Mountain, and relied on these connections for employment, housing, and religious instruction.

== Relationship with the Beat Generation ==
In around 1954 Saijo began to develop an interest in Zen Buddhism, and in 1957 he left USC and moved to San Francisco, where his interest in Zen and haiku brought him into contact with members of the Beat Generation. He worked at the YMCA in San Francisco's Chinatown, and attended courses delivered there by David Hunter of the Human Potential Movement, where he met Lew Welch; and through Welch he met Allen Ginsberg, Joanne Kyger, Gary Snyder, Philip Whalen and others. Saijo eventually moved in with Welch, Whalen, and others, and in 1959 led meditation at Snyder's zendo in Marin, California. Masatsugu argues that Saijo's emergent interest in his Japanese heritage, including haiku and Zen, and his involvement in the Beat Generation, "were enabled in part by the shift in racial discourse and the re-presentation of things Japanese in American society", as fears of a "Yellow Peril" receded and Japan became a Cold War ally to the U.S. At around this time Saijo also met Jack Kerouac, who was already an established writer.

Kerouac, Saijo and Welch took a road trip together from San Francisco to New York, during which they bonded over haiku and Buddhism, and composed poems as they went. On arriving in New York, they visited the apartment Ginsberg shared with Peter Orlovsky, where they presented Ginsberg with a wooden cross stolen from a roadside memorial in Arizona. The three men then spent the night at Kerouac's mother's house in Northport, where Kerouac remained as Saijo and Welch returned west. Trip Trap (1972) is a collection of haiku by Saijo, Kerouac and Welch, which describe their road trip, and invoke Gary Snyder, who was then in Japan, as a kind of guiding spirit. The collection was published after Kerouac and Welch's deaths, and included an introductory essay by Saijo, in which he recalled their trip as involving shared conversations and shared periods of quiet contemplation.

Saijo and Kerouac became friends, bound by a shared wanderlust and appreciation of Zen Buddhism, cool jazz and alcohol. Saijo later was a minor character in Kerouac's Big Sur, in which he takes the name "George Baso" and in Kerouac's depiction of the 1959 drive is described as "the little Japanese Zen master hepcat sitting crosslegged in the back of Dave's [Lew's] jeepster". Rob Wilson has argued that the character of Baso functions as a "link to Zen Buddhism and the Orient for Kerouac, who found the West Coast U.S.A. closer in expansive sentiment and lyrical existence to Asia than to Europe". A photograph of Saijo, Kerouac and Welch composing a poem together in New York was featured in Fred McDarrah's book The Beat Scene. Along with Shig Murao, Saijo is one of only two Asian-American writers usually considered part of the Beat Generation.

== The Backpacker ==
Saijo's The Backpacker (1972) is a short book offering guidance on how backpackers can enter a spiritual psychedelic experience. The original edition was a mere 96 pages with a cover price of $1.95. A new edition featuring an expanded section on food was published in 1977 which expanded the book to nearly 200 pages. Reviewing The Backpacker in the hiking magazine Backpacker in 1973, Denise Van Lear wrote that "no other book so graciously portrays nature's lure as it relates to hikers. Saijo's eloquent prose will transform you."

== Outspeaks ==
Saijo moved from Northern California to Volcano, Hawaii in the early 1990s. Six years later, when he was 71 years old, he published Outspeaks: A Rhapsody (1997), a lyrical memoir. His poetry in Outspeaks is written entirely in capital letters and punctuated with dashes, resembling the work of the poets of the Beat Generation, yet though his poems take a stream-of-consciousness form Saijo did not adhere to Kerouac's mode of spontaneous prose. In his best-known poem, "EARTH SLANGUAGE WITH ENGLISH ON IT" he explains his style by expressing a wish for a "UNIVERSAL GRAMMAR", a "BIRTHRIGHT TONGUE" with "NO FORMAL-VERNACULAR OR DEMOTIC-HIERATIC OPPOSITION". With this "slanguage", he approaches topics including racism, the environment, technology and religion often from unexpected angles. Outspeaks also includes Saijo's recollections of his road trip with Kerouac and Welch, and is grounded in the 1960s: Saijo writes "I CONSIDER MYSELF A CHILD OF THE '60S—IT WAS WHEN I BECAME A REBORN HUMAN".

In her review of Outspeaks in the alternative literary journal Tinfish, Juliana Spahr described Saijo as "a new [William] Blake". Rob Wilson identified Outspeaks as one example of poetry from the area surrounding the Pacific Ocean bearing the markers of two types of postmodernism: "writerly experimentation and textual play ... as well as the concerns of belonging to and expressing a distinct, particularized and limited model of identity, affiliated voice, sentiments of nationhood, and (post)colonial heritage". Wilson interprets Saijo's use of the plover as a signifier of "'ANIMAL CIVILITY,' living on edges and borders, embodying nomadic movement, improvisation, and risk, jazzy flights between solitary foraging and communal roosting: anarchic and poetic existence on a small budget."

In his article on Saijo's historical legacy, Masatsugu analyzes the poem "Bodhisattva Vows", which is included in Outspeaks. In his reading the poem concerns U.S. Orientalism and the burden imposed on people associated with "a racialized Oriental spirituality", but also points to the agency and complicity of the Asian-American subject. In Masatsugu's reading the poem represents the Bodhisattva "as a spiritual laborer with obligations devoid of the sentimental attachments often associated with more exoticized representations of Buddhism or Asian spirituality." Masatsugu describes the poem as ironic and humorous; he reads it as an expression of disdain and resignation at the Bodhisattva's role. He observes that the poem's short sentences, separated by dashes, "convey a sense of the accumulation of obligation in carrying out the vow", and its rendering of the text in all caps "both amplifies and flattens the prose, rendering the narrator's voice clear yet removed."

== Death and legacy ==
Saijo died in Volcano, Hawaii on June 2, 2011. He was survived by his wife Laura, his sister Hisayo, and four stepchildren.

In 2015 an exhibition entitled "Poetry Scores Hawai'i: LOOK LIKE WHAT IT MEANS" was held at the University of Hawaii. The exhibition included work by 29 artists responding to poems by Saijo that were published posthumously in the Bamboo Ridge Press house magazine. The University also hosted a two-day conference celebrating the exhibition and Saijo's work.

== Woodrat Flat ==
In December 2014 Tinfish Press announced it would publish a collection of Saijo's work from the 1980s and 1990s entitled Woodrat Flat, to be edited and introduced by the poet and activist Jerry Martien. In a review for Queen Mob's Teahouse Greg Bem described Woodrat Flat as "a firm but mindful book, one whole composed of many meditations ... a mature book, too, one that can justify its own worth, its own righteousness, and, adversely, its own meek way of cupping a spoonful of quiet here and there to be dripped over the illuminated absurd of the modern world."
