= Desolation Peak (Washington) =

Mountain in Washington (state), United States

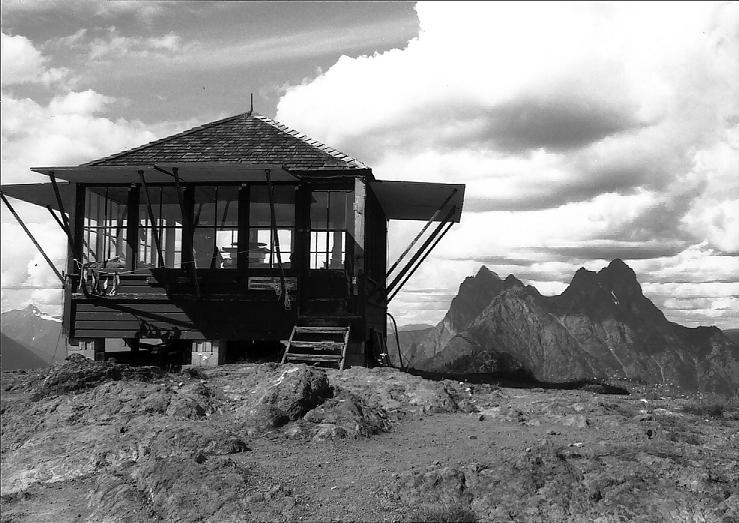
- Desolation Peak Lookout with Mt. Hozomeen in the background

Highest point
- Elevation: 6,102 ft (1,860 m) NGVD 29
- Prominence: 3,249 ft (990 m)
- Coordinates: 48°54′40″N 121°00′58″W

Geography
- Location within Washington (state) Location within the United States
- Location: Whatcom County, Washington, U.S.
- Parent range: North Cascades
- Topo map: USGS Hozomeen Mountain

Climbing
- Easiest route: Trail hike

Desolation Peak is in the North Cascade Mountains of Washington state, about 6.2 miles (10.0 km) south of the Canada–United States border and in the Ross Lake National Recreation Area. It was first climbed in 1926 by Lage Wernstedt, who named it for the destruction caused by a forest fire that swept the slopes bare that same year. At the summit stands a small wooden one-room fire lookout belonging to the National Park Service. The lookout is 15 miles (24 km) from the nearest road and overlooks miles of forest and numerous other peaks.

Jack Kerouac spent 63 days during the summer of 1956 as a fire lookout on Desolation Peak. He wrote about his experiences in The Dharma Bums, Lonesome Traveler, Desolation Angels and in a collection of haiku by the name of "Desolation pops".

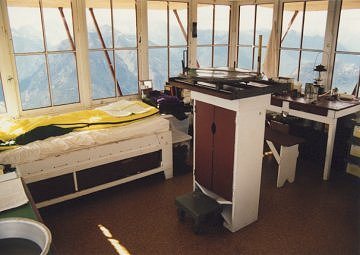
Interior of Desolation Peak Lookout, with bed and firefinder.

Desolation Peak Trail, is a steep hike to high meadows, great views and the fire lookout. It is a very popular hike but strenuous along the East Bank Trail. The trail is often hot and dry. In 2000, in the disappearance of Leah Roberts, her Jeep was found crashed at the bottom. In 2020 Lindsay Hagen published a short film about Jim Henterley, one of the watchmen remaining in service on the Desolation Peak Lookout.

== Geology ==
The North Cascades features some of the most rugged topography in the Cascade Range with craggy peaks, spires, ridges, and deep glacial valleys. Geological events created the diverse topography and drastic elevation changes over the Cascade Range leading to the various climate differences.

The history of the formation of the Cascade Mountains dates back millions of years ago to the late Eocene Epoch. With the North American Plate overriding the Pacific Plate, episodes of volcanic igneous activity persisted. In addition, small fragments of the oceanic and continental lithosphere called terranes created the North Cascades about 50 million years ago.

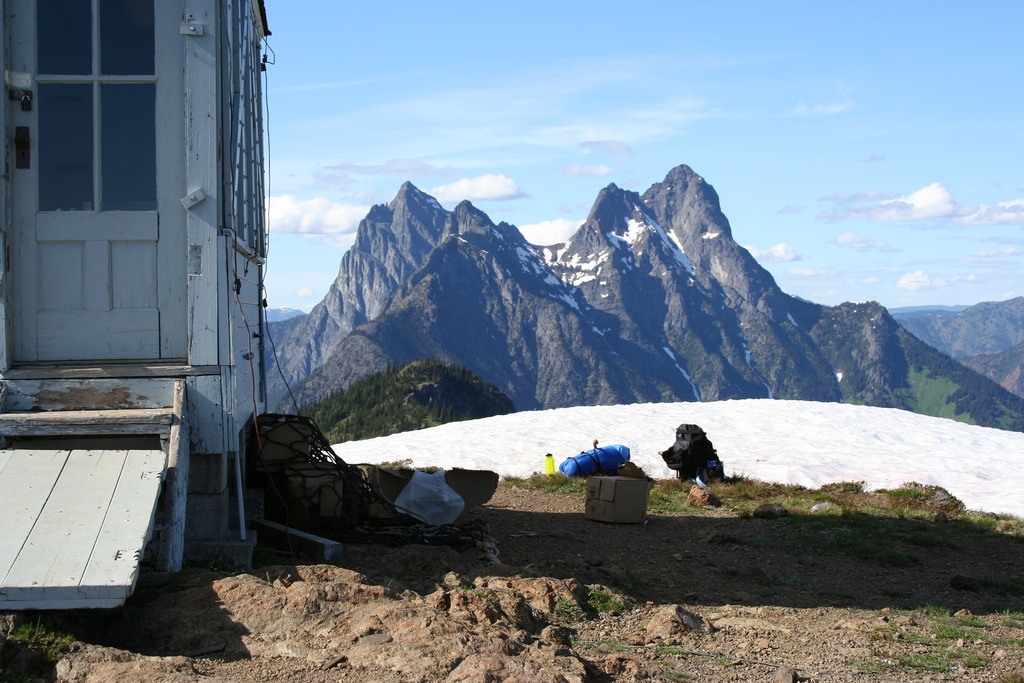
The view of Hozomeen Mountain from Desolation Peak

During the Pleistocene period dating back over two million years ago, glaciation advancing and retreating repeatedly scoured the landscape leaving deposits of rock debris. The U-shaped cross section of the river valleys is a result of recent glaciation. Uplift and faulting in combination with glaciation have been the dominant processes which have created the tall peaks and deep valleys of the North Cascades area.
