= Book of Dreams (novel) =

1960 novel by Jack Kerouac

- First edition cover
- Author: Jack Kerouac
- Language: English
- Publisher: City Lights Press
- Publication date: 1960
- Publication place: United States
- Media type: Print (hardback & paperback)
- ISBN: 0-87286-380-8
- OCLC: 45466141
- Preceded by: Lonesome Traveler (1960)
- Followed by: Big Sur (1962)

Book of Dreams is an experimental novel published by Jack Kerouac in 1960, culled from the dream journal he kept from 1952 to 1960. In the novel, Kerouac attempts to continue plot-lines with characters from his books as he sees them in his dreams. This book is stylistically wild, spontaneous, and flowing, like much of Kerouac's writing, and helps to give insight into the Beat Generation author's mind.
