= The Sea Is My Brother =

2011 posthumous novel by Jack Kerouac

- 2011 first edition cover
- Author: Jack Kerouac
- Language: English
- Publisher: Penguin
- Publication date: November 24, 2011
- Publication place: United States
- Media type: Print (Hardback)
- Pages: 158 pages
- ISBN: 978-0-14-119333-5

The Sea Is My Brother is a novel by the American author Jack Kerouac, published in 2011. The novel was written in 1942 and remained unpublished throughout Kerouac's lifetime due to his dissatisfaction with it. The plot and its characters are based on Kerouac's experience in the United States Merchant Marine during World War II.

Kerouac served on the troop transport Dorchester from July through October 1942 before returning to Columbia University. The Dorchester would be torpedoed three months after Kerouac's departure with most of the 600-man crew dying including the Four Chaplains. This service inspired him to write Sea. The author, who was 20 years old when Sea was written, allegedly thought that the book was "a crock [of shit] as literature", and apparently did not bother to shop it around to publishers. Dawn Ward, editor of the Penguin edition of The Sea Is my Brother, holds that while the novel is not the same as the great work Kerouac produced later in his life, it illuminates Kerouac's early development as a writer. "It was referred to briefly in letters, but nothing that led anyone to believe that there was this really large volume ... This book is really quite important as it shows how Jack developed his writing process."

== Critical reception ==
The Los Angeles Times reviewer David L. Ulin referred to it as "pretty good as far as Kerouac juvenilia goes" and noted the dualities of Kerouac's writing, comparing it to Kerouac's later novel Big Sur (1962). However, Ulin drew comparisons to Kerouac's other early writings and called both them and the novel "claustrophobic, narrow in its focus, disconnected from the complexities of life." Alison McCulloch of The New York Times said that the novel was "stocked with Kerouacian themes, ideas and characters. What it lacks is his style," and commented that, "Kerouac scholars will be fascinated by this early work, but it struggles to stand on its own."

In his review for The Washington Times, John Greenya said The Sea Is My Brother "displays the beginnings of his mature style, and his characteristic themes – in particular male friendships, a journey that includes adventure, and the lure of the open road, or, as in this case, the open sea." Greenya summarised that the novel was "far more than literary juvenilia. Although not a polished work [...] throughout it there are small gems."

The Wall Street Journal reviewer Sam Sacks referred to the novel as a "homely attempt at a Melvillean sea adventure" and described it as "a bad book" but added "it's a fun bad book and offers plenty of disarming insights into who Kerouac was as a person and writer before he slipped behind the mask of Beat Generation Zen-master channeling literature from the ionosphere." Sacks further commented that "the book is enjoyable because, unlike Kerouac's later canonized work, it comes to its faults honestly, out of simple inexperience. The prose is a warbly approximation of what the 21-year-old novelist must have hoped was a sophisticated high style." Chris Nashawaty of Entertainment Weekly awarded The Sea Is My Brother a B rating and described Kerouac as "still struggling to find his voice [but] you'll see hints of the bebop prose that would later pour out of Kerouac's typewriter so effortlessly."
