= List of ships named Nieuw Amsterdam =

Nieuw Amsterdam may refer to one of the following ships of the Holland America Line:

- SS Nieuw Amsterdam (1905), an ocean liner in service 1905–1931
- SS Nieuw Amsterdam (1937), an ocean liner in service 1938–1974
- MS Nieuw Amsterdam (1982), a cruise ship in service 1984–2000
- MS Nieuw Amsterdam (2009), a cruise ship which entered service in 2010
