= Zazenkai =

Zen Buddhist meditation practice

A zazenkai (座禅会), literally meaning "to come together for meditation" is a Zen Buddhist retreat that is usually less intensive and of shorter duration than sesshin. It may comprise a short meeting, without liturgical service, headed by a monastic, or by a group of practitioners without the presence of a teacher. It is also sometimes used to refer to a meeting of lay practitioners who practice together regularly without a resident teacher. It can also denote a period of zazen in a temple schedule.

The meeting itself is punctuated and guided through the use of bells – usually the kinhin bell and the wooden clapper known as a taku. Zazenkai may include a short period of rest or kinhin (walking meditation). A tea ceremony may also follow.

At some Zen centers or temples, zazenkai may be followed by social activities or a dharma talk.
