= Visions of Gerard =

1963 novel by Jack Kerouac

- First edition
- Author: Jack Kerouac
- Language: English
- Publisher: Farrar, Straus and Company
- Publication date: 1963
- Publication place: United States
- Media type: Print (hardback & paperback)
- Pages: 144 pp
- OCLC: 22710206
- Dewey Decimal: 813/.54 20
- LC Class: PS3521.E735 V47 1991
- Preceded by: Big Sur (1962)
- Followed by: Desolation Angels (1965)

Visions of Gerard is a novel by American Beat writer Jack Kerouac. Kerouac wrote it over the course of the first two weeks of 1956, while staying with his sister Caroline in Rocky Mount, North Carolina, and it was published in 1963. It is the first volume in Kerouac's "Duluoz Legend". Visions of Gerard focuses on the scenes and sensations of childhood as evidenced in the short yet happy life of his older brother, Gerard. Kerouac paints a picture of the boy as a saint, who loves all creatures and teaches this doctrine to four-year-old Jack. Set in Kerouac's hometown of Lowell, Massachusetts, it is an exploration of the meaning and precariousness of existence.

== Influence ==
Scholar Laurence Coupe has argued that the identity of the title character of Bob Dylan's song "Visions of Johanna" (from the 1966 album Blonde on Blonde) "echoes" Visions of Gerard, and the song as a whole, like the novel, "would seem to be about the hunger for beatific experience—the hope that the sacred realm might yet be glimpsed within the profane. Johanna, like Gerard, represents the salvation that comes out of suffering. But unlike Kerouac, Dylan depicts this possibility as tauntingly remote—a cause of suffering in itself."

== Character list ==
Kerouac often based his fictional characters on friends and family.

"Because of the objections of my early publishers I was not allowed to use the same personae names in each work."

Real-life person	Character name
Jack Kerouac	Jack Duluoz
Leo Kerouac	Emil "Pop" Duluoz
Gerard Kerouac	Gerard Duluoz
Gabrielle Kerouac	Ange Duluoz
