= Scattered Poems =

Book by Jack Kerouac

- First edition
- Author: Jack Kerouac
- Language: English language
- Genre: Poetry
- Publisher: City Lights Publishers
- Publication date: 1971
- Publication place: United States
- Media type: Print (hardback & paperback)
- Pages: 71 pages
- ISBN: 0-87286-064-7
- OCLC: 30310085

Scattered Poems is a collection of spontaneous poetry by Jack Kerouac. These poems were gathered from underground and ephemeral publications, as well as from notebooks kept by the author. The poems include "San Francisco Blues," the variant texts of "Pull My Daisy," and "American Haiku".
