= Book of Sketches =

- First edition
- Author: Jack Kerouac
- Language: English
- Genre: Poetry; Beat prose
- Published: 2006 Penguin Poets
- Publication place: United States
- Media type: Print (paperback)
- Pages: Approx. 400 pages
- ISBN: 0-14-200215-1
- OCLC: 61461793
- Dewey Decimal: 818/.5403 22
- LC Class: PS3521.E735 B667 2006

Book of Sketches is a collection of spontaneous prose poetry by the American novelist and poet Jack Kerouac, published posthumously in 2006. The poems, written in 1952 and 1953 in a notebook carried in his breast pocket, describe Kerouac's travels through the U.S. states of New York, North Carolina and Kansas, and the cities of San Francisco, California; Denver, Colorado; Mexico City, Mexico; and his birthplace of Lowell, Massachusetts. They also discuss themes of art, life, American, Buddhism, jazz, the role of the writer, loneliness, and the wandering lifestyle. Book of Sketches features an introduction by the artist George Condo.
