= Big Sur (novel) =

1962 novel by Jack Kerouac

- First edition cover
- Author: Jack Kerouac
- Language: English
- Series: Duluoz Legend
- Genre: Beat, stream of consciousness
- Publisher: Farrar, Straus and Cudahy
- Publication date: September 11, 1962
- Publication place: United States
- Media type: Print
- Pages: 256
- ISBN: 0-14-016812-5
- OCLC: 26089403
- Dewey Decimal: 813/.54 20
- LC Class: PS3521.E735 B5 1992
- Preceded by: Lonesome Traveler (1960)
- Followed by: Visions of Gerard (1963)

Big Sur is a 1962 novel by Jack Kerouac, written in the fall of 1961 over a ten-day period, with Kerouac typewriting onto a teletype roll. It recounts the events surrounding Kerouac's (here known by the name of his fictional alter-ego Jack Duluoz) three brief sojourns to a cabin in Bixby Canyon, Big Sur, California, owned by Kerouac's friend and Beat poet Lawrence Ferlinghetti; at the same time dealing with his increased drinking and declining mental health. It is Kerouac’s first novel to be fully written following his success in the late 1950s, and thus departs from his previous fictionalized autobiographical series in that the character Duluoz is shown as a popular, published author; most of Kerouac's previous novels instead portray him as a bohemian traveller.

== Synopsis ==
The novel depicts Jack Duluoz's mental and physical deterioration in the late 1950s. Despite having found mainstream success with his work, Duluoz is unable to cope with a suddenly demanding public, and is battling advanced alcoholism. He seeks respite first in solitude in the cabin at Big Sur, on the California coast, and later in a relationship with Billie, the mistress of his long-time friend Cody Pomeray (Neal Cassady). Duluoz finds respite in the Big Sur wilderness, but is driven by loneliness to return to the city, and resumes drinking heavily.

Across Duluoz's subsequent trips to Big Sur and interleaved lifestyle in San Francisco, he drunkenly embarrasses Cody by introducing Billie to Cody's wife, and finds himself unable to emotionally provide for the increasingly demanding Billie (who proves to be mentally unstable herself) and to integrate into suburban life. On Duluoz’s third and final trip to Big Sur, he brings friends Dave Wain and Româno Schwartz (Lew Welch and Lenore Kandel), along with Billie's son Elliot. The peaceful trip soon goes afoul when Duluoz’s inner turmoil culminates in his having several panic attacks. The group leaves the following day.

An addendum to the book contains a free verse poem by Kerouac, "Sea: Sounds of the Pacific Ocean at Big Sur", written from the perspective of the Pacific Ocean.

== Character key ==
Kerouac often based his fictional characters on his friends and family.

"Because of the objections of my early publishers I was not allowed to use the same personae names in each work."

Real-life person	Character name
Jack Kerouac	Jack Duluoz
Neal Cassady	Cody Pomeray
Carolyn Cassady	Evelyn
Lawrence Ferlinghetti	Lorenzo Monsanto
Allen Ginsberg	Irwin Garden
Lenore Kandel	Româna Swartz
Robert LaVigne	Robert Browning
Michael McClure	Pat McLear
Jackie Gibson Mercer	Willamine "Billie" Dabney
Albert Saijo	George Baso
Gary Snyder	Jarry Wagner
Lew Welch	Dave Wain
Philip Whalen	Ben Fagan
Victor Wong	Arthur Ma
Lucien Carr	Julien

== Film adaptation ==
A film adaptation of the novel, directed by Michael Polish, was released in 2013. The cast includes Jean-Marc Barr as Kerouac, Josh Lucas as Neal Cassady, Radha Mitchell as Carolyn Cassady, Henry Thomas as Whalen, Anthony Edwards as Ferlinghetti, Balthazar Getty as McClure, Patrick Fischler as Welch, and Stana Katic as Kandel.
