= Tristessa =

1960 novella by Jack Kerouac

- First edition
- Author: Jack Kerouac
- Language: English
- Publisher: Avon
- Publication date: 1960
- Publication place: United States
- Media type: Print (hardback & paperback)
- Pages: 96 pp
- OCLC: 24871127
- Dewey Decimal: 813/.54 20
- LC Class: PS3521.E735 T73 1992
- Preceded by: Maggie Cassidy (1959)
- Followed by: Lonesome Traveler (1960)

Tristessa is a 1960 novella by Beat Generation writer Jack Kerouac set in Mexico City. It is based on his relationship with a Mexican prostitute (the title character). The woman's real name was Esperanza ("hope" in Spanish); Kerouac changed her name to Tristessa (a spelling he made up from tristeza which means "sadness" in Spanish).

The novel was translated into Spanish by Mexican writer Jorge García-Robles.

== Summary ==
Allen Ginsberg, in describing the book, wrote "Tristessa's a narrative meditation studying a hen, a rooster, a dove, a cat, a dog, family meat, and a ravishing, ravished junkie lady". In Tristessa, Kerouac attempts to sketch for the reader a picture of quiet transcendence in hectic and sometimes dangerous circumstances. He chronicles Tristessa's addiction to morphine and impoverished life with descriptions tinged with elements of her saintly beauty and her innocence.

Early in the novel, Kerouac attempts to communicate his Buddhist beliefs. These beliefs become entangled as a metaphor in the unfamiliar culture and language that Kerouac tries to grasp and make contact with in the story.

The self-destructive nature of her addiction contrast with the beauty of Kerouac's descriptions. Also, as a part of the study of the life of a junkie, is the character of Old Bull Gaines - Bill Garver, in real life, a long-time friend of William S. Burroughs and other writers of the Beat Generation - who serves as both dealer and healer of Tristessa when Jack is unable to be what she needs.
