= The Dharma Bums =

1958 novel by Jack Kerouac

- First edition
- Author: Jack Kerouac
- Language: English
- Genre: Novel, Beat literature
- Set in: California, North Carolina, Washington and elsewhere in the U.S. and Mexico, 1955–56
- Published: October 2, 1958 (The Viking Press)
- Publication place: United States
- Media type: Print (hardback & paperback)
- Pages: 187
- OCLC: 23051682
- Dewey Decimal: 813/.54 20
- LC Class: PS3521.E735 D48 1990
- Preceded by: The Subterraneans (1958)
- Followed by: Doctor Sax (1959)

The Dharma Bums is a 1958 novel by Beat Generation author Jack Kerouac. The basis for the novel's semi-fictional accounts are events occurring years after the events of On the Road. The main characters are the narrator Ray Smith, based on Kerouac, and Japhy Ryder, based on the poet and essayist Gary Snyder, who was instrumental in Kerouac's introduction to Buddhism in the mid-1950s.

The book concerns duality in Kerouac's life and ideals, examining the relationship of the outdoors, mountaineering, hiking, and hitchhiking through the western US with his "city life" of jazz clubs, poetry readings, and drunken parties. The protagonist's search for a "Buddhist" context to his experiences (and those of others he encounters) recurs throughout the story.

Released just one year following the success of his previous novel, On the Road, The Dharma Bums was another success for Kerouac and became one of his most popular books. The novel had a significant influence on the Hippie counterculture during the 1960s.

== Plot summary ==
The character Japhy drives Ray Smith's story, whose penchant for simplicity and Zen Buddhism influenced Kerouac on the eve of the sudden and unpredicted success of On the Road. The action shifts between the events of Smith and Ryder's "city life," such as three-day parties and enactments of the Buddhist "Yab-Yum" rituals, to the sublime and peaceful imagery where Kerouac seeks a type of transcendence. The novel concludes with a change in narrative style, with Kerouac working alone as a fire lookout on Desolation Peak (adjacent to Hozomeen Mountain), in what would soon be declared North Cascades National Park (see also Kerouac's novel Desolation Angels). His summer on Desolation Peak was desperately lonely. “Many's the time I thought I'd die of boredom or jump off the mountain,” he wrote in Desolation Angels. Yet in The Dharma Bums, Kerouac described the experience in elegiac prose.

One episode in the book features Smith, Ryder, and Henry Morley (based on real-life friend John Montgomery) climbing Matterhorn Peak in California. It relates Kerouac's introduction to this type of mountaineering and inspired him to spend the following summer as a fire lookout for the United States Forest Service on Desolation Peak in Washington.

Chapter 2 of the novel gives an account of the legendary 1955 Six Gallery reading, where Allen Ginsberg ('Alvah Goldbook' in the book) gave a debut presentation of his poem "Howl" (changed to "Wail" in the book). At the event, other authors including Snyder, Kenneth Rexroth, Michael McClure, and Philip Whalen also performed.

Anyway I followed the whole gang of howling poets to the reading at Gallery Six that night, which was, among other important things, the night of the birth of the San Francisco Poetry Renaissance. Everyone was there. It was a mad night. And I was the one who got things jumping by going around collecting dimes and quarters from the rather stiff audience standing around in the gallery and coming back with three huge gallon jugs of California Burgundy and getting them all piffed so that by eleven o'clock when Alvah Goldbook was reading his poem 'Wail' drunk with arms outspread everybody was yelling 'Go! Go! Go!' (like a jam session) and old Rheinhold Cacoethes the father of the Frisco poetry scene was wiping his tears in gladness.

== Character key ==
Kerouac often based his fictional characters on friends and family.

"Because of the objections of my early publishers I was not allowed to use the same personae names in each work."

— Jack Kerouac

Real-life person	Character name
Jack Kerouac	Ray Smith
Gary Snyder	Japhy Ryder
Allen Ginsberg	Alvah Goldbook
Neal Cassady	Cody Pomeray
Philip Whalen	Warren Coughlin
Locke McCorkle	Sean Monahan
John Montgomery	Henry Morley
Philip Lamantia	Francis DaPavia
Michael McClure	Ike O'Shay
Peter Orlovsky	George
Kenneth Rexroth	Rheinhold Cacoethes
Alan Watts	Arthur Whane
Caroline Kerouac	Nin
Carolyn Cassady	Evelyn
Claude Dalenberg	Bud Diefendorf
Natalie Jackson	Rosie Buchanan

== Reception ==
Gary Snyder wrote Kerouac saying "Dharma Bums is a beautiful book, & I am amazed & touched that you should say so many nice things about me because that period was for me really a great process of learning from you..." but confided to Philip Whalen, "I do wish Jack had taken more trouble to smooth out dialogues, etc. Transitions are rather abrupt sometimes." Later, Snyder chided Kerouac for the book's misogynistic interpretation of Buddhism.

== See also ==
- Dharma
