= Philip Whalen =

American poet (1923–2002)

Philip Glenn Whalen
- Title: Poet; Zen Buddhist; Author

Personal life
- Born: October 20, 1923 Portland, Oregon, US
- Died: June 26, 2002 (aged 78) San Francisco, California, US
- Education: Reed College

Religious life
- Religion: Buddhism
- School: Sōtō
- Lineage: Shunryu Suzuki

Philip Glenn Whalen (October 20, 1923 – June 26, 2002) was an American poet, Zen Buddhist, and a key figure in the San Francisco Renaissance and close to the Beat Generation.

== Biography ==
Born in Portland, Oregon, Whalen grew up in The Dalles from age four until he returned to Portland in 1941. He served in the US Army Air Forces during World War II. He attended Reed College on the GI Bill. There, he met Gary Snyder and Lew Welch, and graduated with a BA in 1951. He read at the famous Six Gallery reading in 1955 that marked the launch of the West Coast Beats into the public eye. He appears, in barely fictionalized form, as the character "Warren Coughlin" in Jack Kerouac's The Dharma Bums, which includes an account of that reading. In Big Sur he is called "Ben Fagan". Whalen's poetry was featured in Donald Allen's anthology The New American Poetry 1945-1960.

Whalen's first interest in Eastern religions centered on Vedanta. Upon release from the army in 1946, he visited the Vedanta Society in Portland, but did not pursue this very far, because of the expense of attending their countryside ashram. Tibetan Buddhism also attracted him, but he found it "unnecessarily complicated." In 1952, Gary Snyder lent him books on Zen by D. T. Suzuki. With Snyder, Whalen attended a study group at the Jōdo Shinshū Buddhist Church in Berkeley. Ultimately, Zen became his chosen path.

Whalen spent 1966 and 1967 in Kyoto, Japan, assisted by a grant from the American Academy of Arts and Letters and a job teaching English. There, he practiced zazen daily, and wrote some forty poems and a second novel.

He moved into the San Francisco Zen Center and became a student of Zentatsu Richard Baker in 1972. The following year, he became a monk. He became head monk of Dharma Sangha, in Santa Fe, New Mexico in 1984. In 1987, he received transmission from Baker, and in 1991, he returned to San Francisco to lead the Hartford Street Zen Center until ill health forced him to retire.

== Poetry ==
- The Calendar, a Book of Poems. Reed College, thesis (B.A.), Portland, Ore. 1951.
- Self Portrait from Another Direction. (Broadside), Auerhahn Press, San Francisco 1959.
- Memoirs of an Interglacial Age. Auerhahn Press, San Francisco 1960.
- Like I Say. Totem Press/Corinth Books, New York 1960
- Monday in the Evening, 21:VII:61. Pezzoli, Milan 1964
- Every Day. Coyote's Journal, Eugene, Oregon 1965
- Highgrade: Doodles, Poems. Coyote's Journal, San Francisco 1966
- On Bear's Head. Harcourt, Brace & World/Coyote, New York 1969
- Scenes of Life at the Capital. Maya, San Francisco 1970
- Enough Said: Fluctuat Nec Mergitur: Poems 1974-1979. Grey Fox Press, San Francisco 1980.
- Heavy Breathing: Poems 1967-1980. Grey Fox Press, San Francisco 1983
- Canoeing up Cabarga Creek: Buddhist Poems 1955-1986. Parallax Press, Berkeley 1996.
- Overtime: Selected Poems by Philip Whalen. Penguin, New York 1999.
- The Collected Poems of Philip Whalen. Wesleyan University Press, Middletown, Connecticut 2007.

Both the Collected and Selected Poems were edited by Michael Rothenberg.

== Prose ==
- You Didn't Even Try. Coyote, San Francisco 1967. (novel)
- Imaginary Speeches for a Brazen Head. Black Sparrow Press, Los Angeles 1972. (novel)
- Off the Wall: Interviews with Philip Whalen. Donald Allen, editor. Grey Fox Press, Bolinas, California 1978.
- The Diamond Noodle. Poltroon Press, Berkeley 1980. (memoirs)
- Winning His Way, or, the Rise of William Johnson: a diverting history for the instruction & improvement of the breed. Free Print Shop, San Francisco, California, 1983.
- Two Novels. Zephyr Press, Somerville, Mass. 1985.
- Goof Book (for Jack Kerouac). Big Bridge Press, Guerneville, Calif. 2001. (journal)

== See also ==
- Timeline of Zen Buddhism in the United States
