= Jack Kerouac =

American writer (1922–1969)

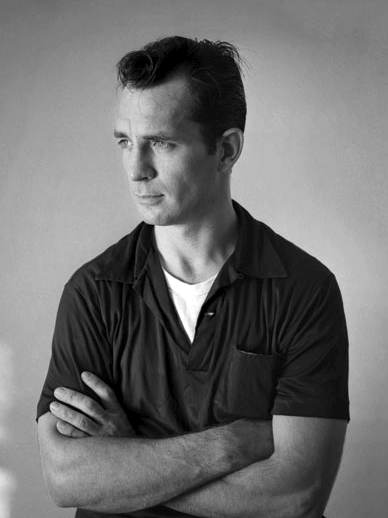
- Kerouac, c. 1956
- Born: Jean-Louis Lebris de Kérouac; March 12, 1922; Lowell, Massachusetts, U.S.
- Died: October 21, 1969 (aged 47); St. Petersburg, Florida, U.S.
- Occupations: Novelist; poet
- Spouses: Edie Parker (m. 1944; div. 1948) Joan Haverty (m. 1950; div. 1951) Stella Sampas (m. 1966)
- Children: Jan Kerouac
- Writing career
- Period: 1950–1968
- Notable works: On the Road (1957); The Dharma Bums (1958); Big Sur (1962); Desolation Angels (1965)
- Movements: Beat; Franco-American

Jean-Louis Lebris de Kérouac (/ˈkɛru.æk/; March 12, 1922 – October 21, 1969), known as Jack Kerouac, was an American novelist and poet who, alongside William S. Burroughs and Allen Ginsberg, was a pioneer of the Beat Generation.

Of French-Canadian parentage, Kerouac was raised in a French-speaking home in Lowell, Massachusetts. He "learned English at age six and spoke with a marked accent into his late teens." During World War II, he served as a United States Merchant Mariner; he completed his first novel at the time, which was published more than 40 years after his death. His first published book was The Town and the City (1950), and he achieved widespread fame and notoriety with his second, On the Road, in 1957. It made him a Beat icon, and he went on to publish 12 more novels and numerous poetry volumes.

Kerouac died in 1969. Since then, his literary prestige has grown, and several previously unseen works have been published. Kerouac is recognized for his style of stream of consciousness spontaneous prose. Thematically, his work covers topics such as religion and mysticism, childhood, poetry and literature, New York City and the Bay Area in the 40s and 50s, Buddhism, and life. He became an underground celebrity and, with other Beats, a progenitor of the hippie movement, although he despised the hippies and mostly remained uninterested in politics. He has a lasting legacy, greatly influencing many of the cultural icons of the 1960s, including Bob Dylan, the Beatles, Jerry Garcia, and the Doors.

== Biography ==
=== Early life and adolescence ===
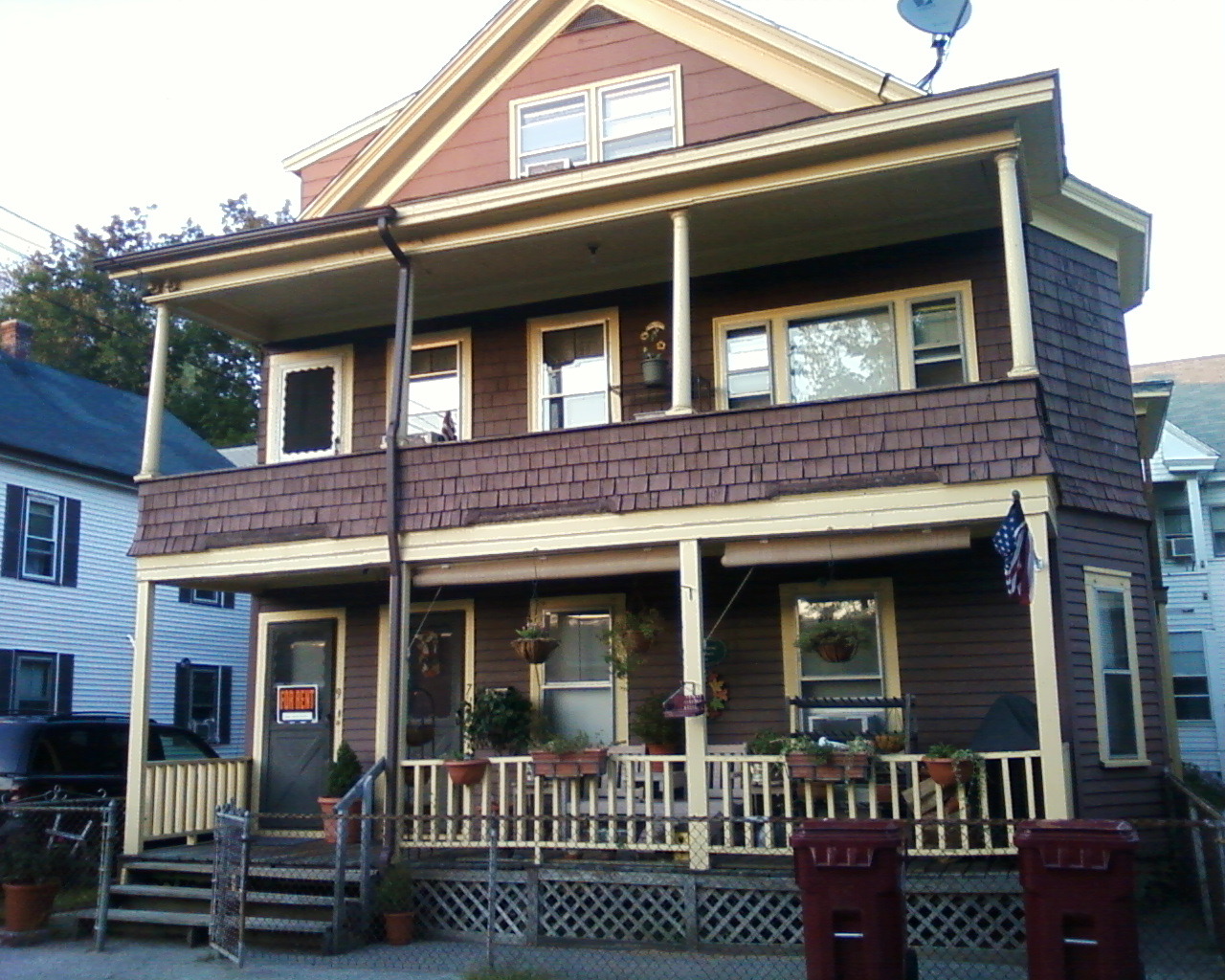
Jack Kerouac's birthplace, 9 Lupine Road, 2nd floor, West Centralville, Lowell, Massachusetts

Kerouac was born on March 12, 1922, in Lowell, Massachusetts, to French Canadian parents, Léo-Alcide Kéroack and Gabrielle-Ange Lévesque.

There is some confusion surrounding his name, partly because of variations on the spelling of Kerouac, and because of Kerouac's own statement of his name as Jean-Louis Lebris de Kerouac. His reason for that statement seems to be linked to an old family legend that the Kerouacs had descended from Baron François Louis Alexandre Lebris de Kerouac. Kerouac's baptism certificate lists his name simply as Jean Louis Kirouac, the most common spelling of the name in Quebec. Kerouac's roots were indeed in Brittany, and he was descended from a middle-class merchant colonist, Urbain-François Le Bihan, Sieur de Kervoac, whose sons married French Canadians.

Kerouac's father Leo had been born into a family of potato farmers in the village of Saint-Hubert-de-Rivière-du-Loup, Quebec. Jack also had various stories on the etymology of his surname, usually tracing it to Irish, Breton, Cornish, or other Celtic roots. In one interview he claimed it was from the name of the Cornish language (Kernewek), and that the Kerouacs had fled from Cornwall to Brittany. Another version was that the Kerouacs had come to Cornwall from Ireland before the time of Christ and the name meant "language of the house". In still another interview he said it was an Irish word for "language of the water" and related to Kerwick. Kerouac, derived from Kervoach, is the name of a town in Brittany in Lanmeur, near Morlaix.

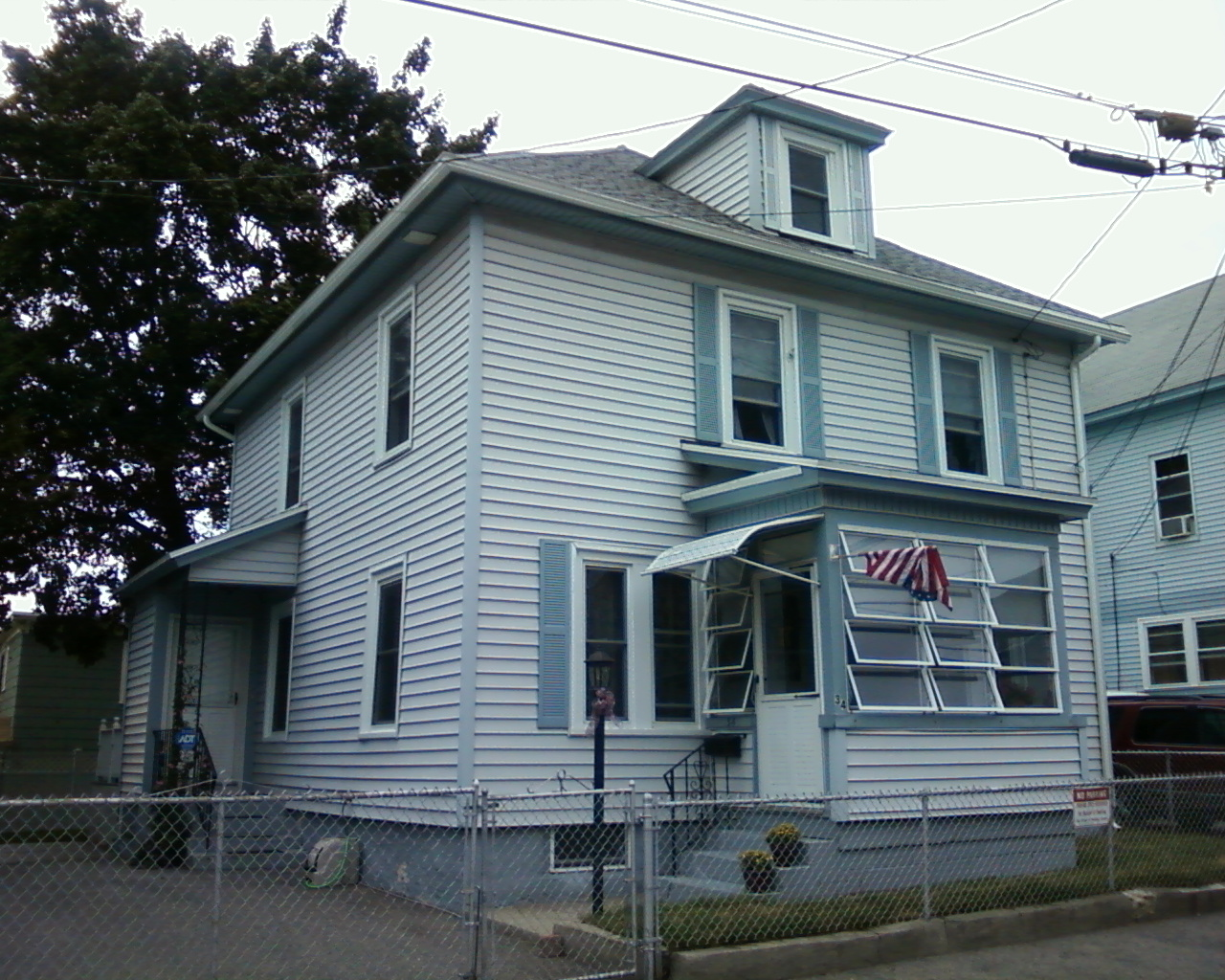
His third of several homes growing up in the West Centralville section of Lowell

Jack Kerouac later referred to 34 Beaulieu Street as "sad Beaulieu". The Kerouac family was living there in 1926 when Jack's older brother Gerard died of rheumatic fever, aged nine. This deeply affected four-year-old Jack, who later said Gerard followed him in life as a guardian angel. This is the Gerard of Kerouac's novel Visions of Gerard. He had one other sibling, an older sister named Caroline. Kerouac was referred to as Ti Jean or little John around the house during his childhood.

Kerouac spoke French with his family and began learning English at school, around age six; he began speaking it confidently in his late teens. He was a serious child who was devoted to his mother, who played an important role in his life. She was a devout Catholic, who instilled this deep faith into both her sons. He later said she was the only woman he ever loved. After Gerard died, his mother sought solace in her faith, while his father abandoned it, wallowing in drinking, gambling, and smoking.

Some of Kerouac's poetry was written in French, and in letters written to friend Allen Ginsberg towards the end of his life, he expressed a desire to speak his parents' native tongue again. In 2016, a whole volume of previously unpublished works originally written in French by Kerouac was published as La vie est d'hommage.

On May 17, 1928, while six years old, Kerouac made his first Confession. For penance, he was told to say a rosary, during which he heard God tell him that he had a good soul, that he would suffer in life and die in pain and horror, but would in the end receive salvation. This experience, along with his dying brother's vision of the Virgin Mary (as the nuns fawned over him, convinced he was a saint), combined with a later study of Buddhism and an ongoing commitment to Christ, solidified the worldview which informed his work.

Kerouac once told Ted Berrigan, in an interview for The Paris Review, of an incident in the 1940s in which his mother and father were walking together in a Jewish neighborhood on the Lower East Side of New York. He recalled "a whole bunch of rabbis walking arm in arm ... teedah- teedah – teedah ... and they wouldn't part for this Christian man and his wife, so my father went POOM! and knocked a rabbi right in the gutter." Leo, after the death of his child, also treated a priest with similar contempt, angrily throwing him out of the house despite his invitation from Gabrielle.

Kerouac was a capable athlete in football and wrestling. Kerouac's skills as running back in football for Lowell High School earned him scholarship offers from Boston College, Notre Dame, and Columbia University, where he enrolled in 1940.

From around this time, Kerouac's journal includes an ambitious "Immediate Reading List," a wide-ranging list that includes sacred texts from India and China as well as a note to read "Emerson and Thoreau (again)."

He spent a year at Horace Mann School, where he befriended Seymour Wyse, an Englishman whom he later featured as a character, under the pseudonym 'Lionel Smart', in several of Kerouac's books. He also cites Wyse as the person who introduced him to the new styles of jazz, including bop. After his year at Horace Mann, Kerouac earned the requisite grades for entry to Columbia. He felt a growing tension between football and literature and he later quit the team. Kerouac broke a leg playing football during his freshman season, and during an abbreviated second year he argued constantly with coach Lou Little, who kept him benched. While at Columbia, Kerouac wrote several sports articles for the student newspaper, the Columbia Daily Spectator, and joined the Phi Gamma Delta fraternity. He was a resident of Livingston Hall and Hartley Hall, where other Beat Generation figures lived. He also studied at The New School.

=== Early adulthood ===
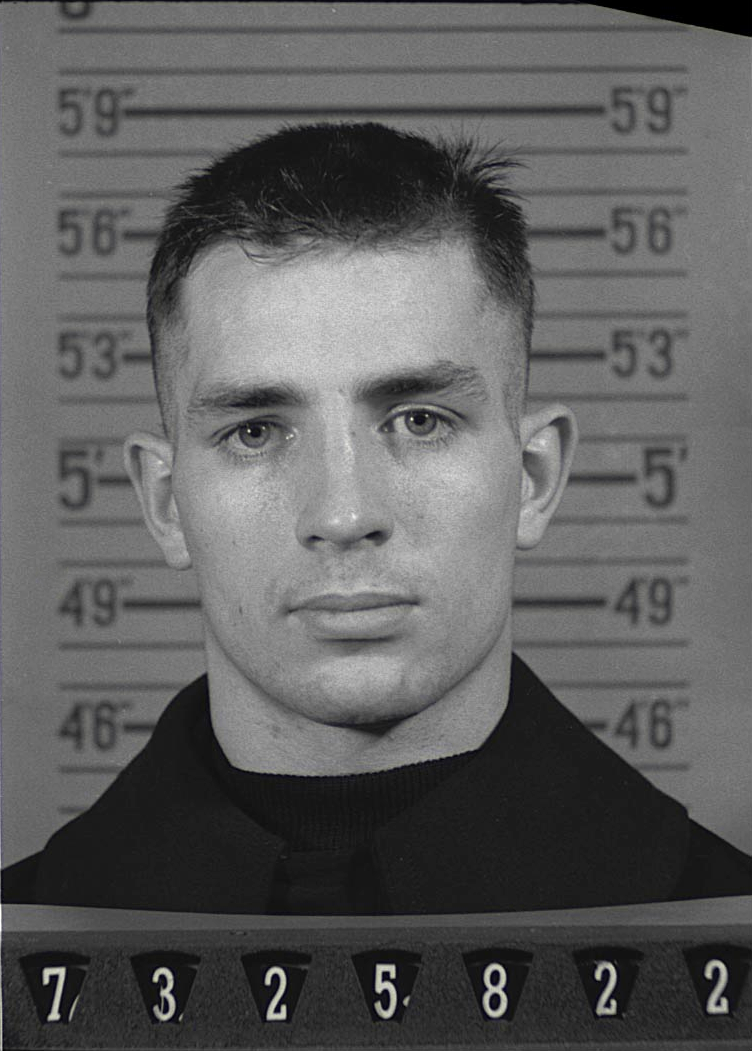
Kerouac's Naval Reserve Enlistment photograph, 1943

When his football career at Columbia ended, Kerouac dropped out of the university. He continued to live for a time in New York's Upper West Side with his girlfriend and future first wife, Edie Parker. It was during this time that he first met the Beat Generation figures who shaped his legacy and became characters in many of his novels, such as Allen Ginsberg, Neal Cassady, John Clellon Holmes, Herbert Huncke, Lucien Carr, and William S. Burroughs.

During World War II, Kerouac was a United States Merchant Mariner from July to October 1942 and served on the SS Dorchester before its maiden voyage. A few months later, the SS Dorchester was sunk during a submarine attack while crossing the Atlantic, and several of his former shipmates were lost. In 1943 he joined the United States Navy Reserves. He served eight days of active duty with the Navy before arriving on the sick list. According to his medical report, Kerouac said he "asked for an aspirin for his headaches and they diagnosed me dementia praecox and sent me here." The medical examiner reported that Kerouac's military adjustment was poor, quoting Kerouac: "I just can't stand it; I like to be by myself." Two days later he was honorably discharged on the psychiatric grounds that he was of "indifferent character" with a diagnosis of "schizoid personality".

While a Merchant Mariner in 1942, Kerouac wrote his first novel, The Sea Is My Brother. The book was published in 2011, 70 years after it was written and over 40 years after Kerouac's death. Kerouac described the work as being about "man's simple revolt from society as it is, with the inequalities, frustration, and self-inflicted agonies." He viewed the work as a failure, calling it a "crock as literature" and never actively seeking to publish it.

In 1944, Kerouac was arrested as a material witness in the murder of David Kammerer, who allegedly had been stalking Kerouac's friend Lucien Carr since Carr was a teenager in St. Louis. William Burroughs was also a native of St. Louis, and it was through Carr that Kerouac came to know both Burroughs and Allen Ginsberg. Carr said Kammerer's homosexual obsession turned aggressive, finally provoking Carr to stab him to death in self-defense. Carr dumped the body in the Hudson River. Afterwards, Carr sought help from Kerouac. Kerouac disposed of the murder weapon and buried Kammerer's eyeglasses. Carr, encouraged by his mother, turned himself in to the police. Kerouac and Burroughs were later arrested as material witnesses. Kerouac's father refused to pay his bail; Kerouac then agreed to marry Edie Parker if her parents would pay the bail. They married on Tuesday August 22, 1944, in the Municipal Building, with two detectives as witnesses, before Kerouac was returned to his cell in the Bronx City Prison (their marriage was annulled in 1948.) Kerouac and Burroughs collaborated on a novel about the Kammerer killing titled And the Hippos Were Boiled in Their Tanks. Though the book was not published during their lifetimes, an excerpt eventually appeared in Word Virus: The William S. Burroughs Reader (and as noted below, the novel was finally published late 2008). Kerouac also later wrote about the killing in his novel Vanity of Duluoz.

Later, Kerouac lived with his parents in the Ozone Park neighborhood of Queens, after they had also moved to New York. He wrote his first published novel, The Town and the City, and began On the Road around 1949 when living there. His friends jokingly called him "The Wizard of Ozone Park", alluding to Thomas Edison's nickname, "the Wizard of Menlo Park", and to the film The Wizard of Oz.

=== Early career: 1950–1957 ===
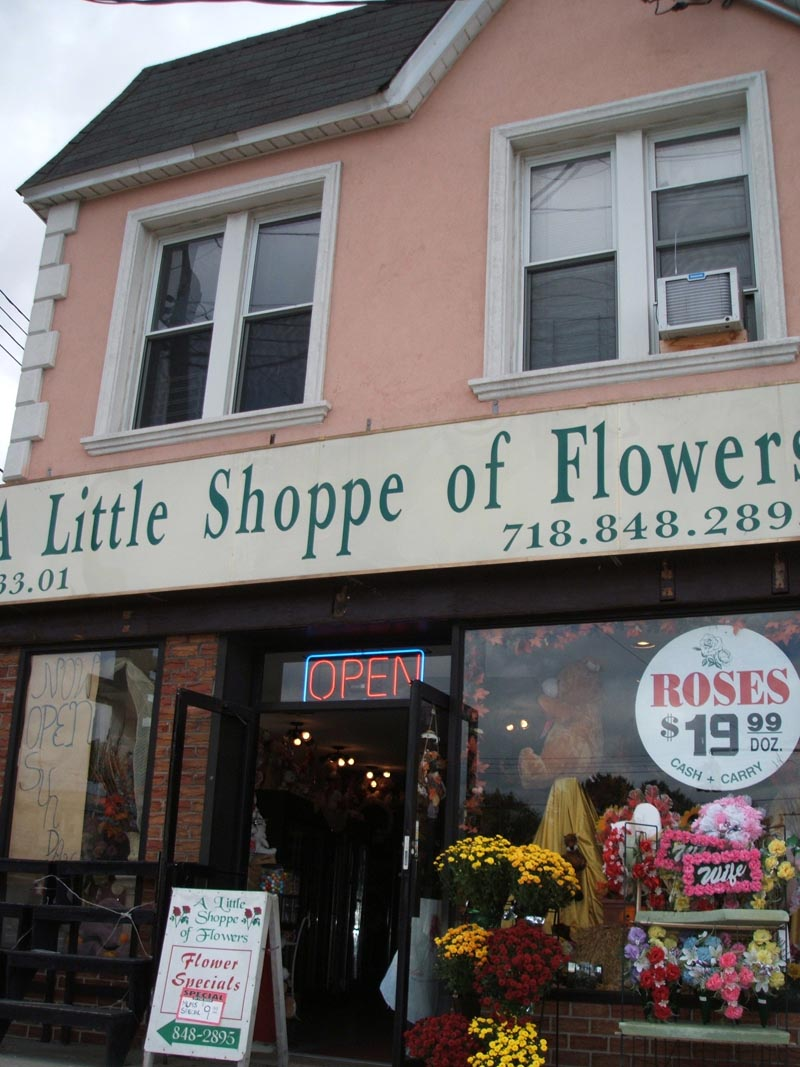
Jack Kerouac lived with his parents for a time above a corner drug store in Ozone Park (now a flower shop), while writing some of his earliest work. There was no phone in the apartment and they would take calls from a public phone in the drug store downstairs. Kerouac would bring a kettle to the bar across the street to be filled with beer for family meals.

The Town and the City was published in 1950 under the name "John Kerouac" and, though it earned him a few respectable reviews, the book sold poorly. Heavily influenced by Kerouac's reading of Thomas Wolfe, it reflects on the generational epic formula and the contrasts of small-town life versus the multi-dimensional and larger life of the city. The book was heavily edited by Robert Giroux, with around 400 pages taken out.

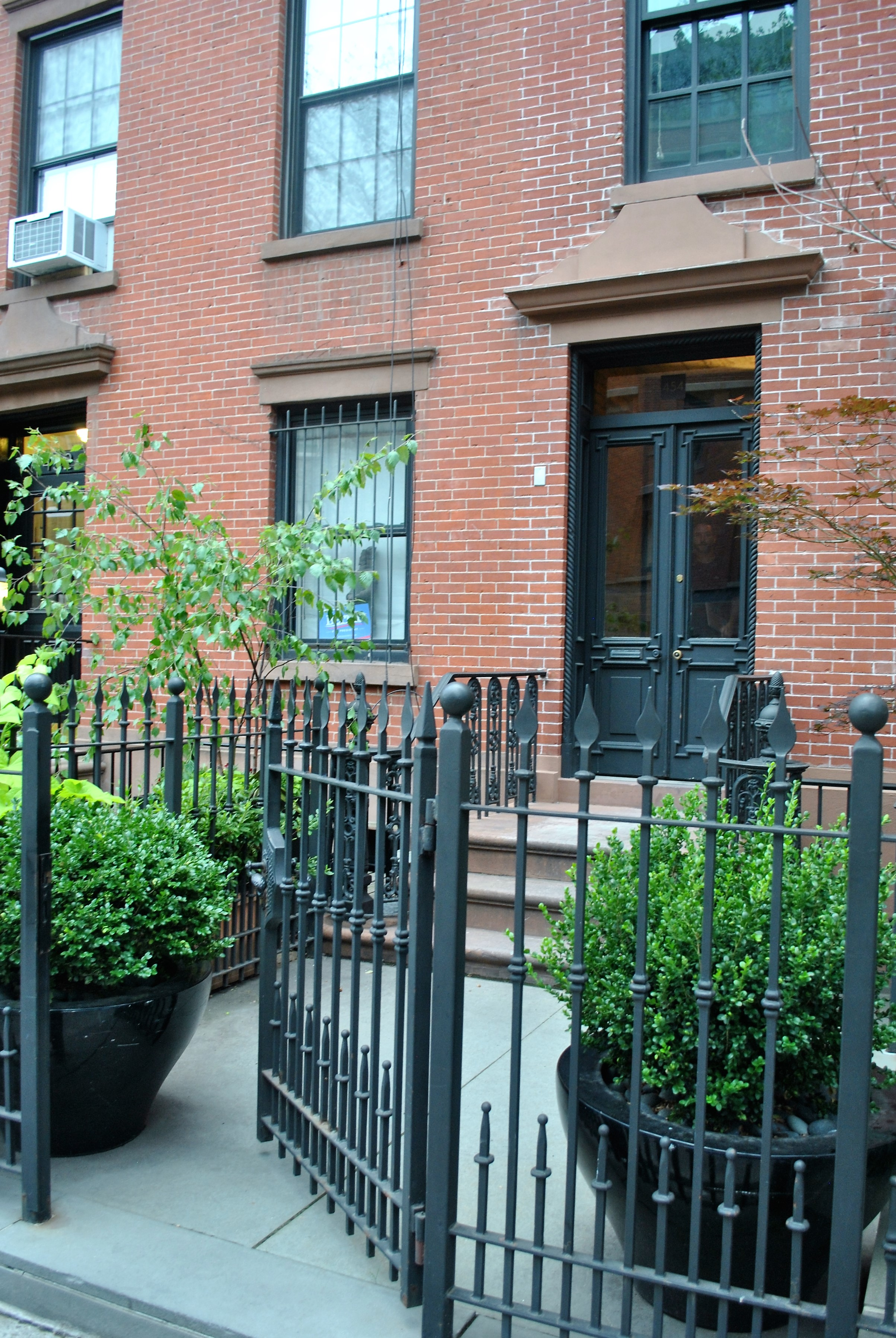
454 West 20th Street

For the next six years, Kerouac continued to write regularly. Building upon previous drafts tentatively titled "The Beat Generation" and "Gone on the Road", he completed what is now known as On the Road in April 1951, while living at 454 West 20th Street in Manhattan with his second wife, Joan Haverty. The book was largely autobiographical and describes Kerouac's road-trip adventures across the United States and Mexico with Neal Cassady in the late 40s and early 50s, as well as his relationships with other Beat writers and friends. Although some of the novel is focused on driving, Kerouac did not have a driver's license, and Cassady did most of the cross-country driving. Kerouac learned to drive at age 34 but never had a formal license.

Kerouac completed the first version of the novel during a three-week extended session of spontaneous confessional prose. Kerouac wrote the final draft in 20 days with Joan, his wife, supplying him with benzedrine, cigarettes, bowls of pea soup, and mugs of coffee to keep him going. Before beginning, Kerouac cut sheets of tracing paper into long strips, wide enough for a typewriter, and taped them together into a 120-foot (37 m) long roll, which he then fed into the machine. This allowed him to type continuously without the interruption of reloading pages. The resulting manuscript contained no chapter or paragraph breaks and was much more explicit than the version that was eventually published. Though "spontaneous," Kerouac had prepared long in advance before beginning to write. In fact, according to his Columbia professor and mentor Mark Van Doren, he had outlined much of the work in his journals over several preceding years.

Though Kerouac completed On the Road quickly, he had a long and difficult time finding a publisher. Before the novel was accepted by Viking Press, he got a job as a "railroad brakeman and fire lookout" (including a stint as lookout at Desolation Peak), traveling between the East and West coasts of the United States to earn money. During this period, he often stayed back in New York at the home of his mother in Richmond Hill, Queens, where he found rest and the quiet space necessary for writing. While employed in this way he met and befriended Abe Green, a young freight train jumper who later introduced Kerouac to Herbert Huncke, a Times Square street hustler and favorite of many Beat Generation writers.

According to Kerouac, On the Road "was really a story about two Catholic buddies roaming the country in search of God. And we found him. I found him in the sky, in Market Street San Francisco (those 2 visions), and Dean (Neal) had God sweating out of his forehead all the way. THERE IS NO OTHER WAY OUT FOR THE HOLY MAN: HE MUST SWEAT FOR GOD. And once he has found Him, the Godhood of God is forever Established and really must not be spoken about." According to his biographer, historian Douglas Brinkley, On the Road has been misinterpreted as a tale of companions out looking for kicks, but the most important thing to comprehend is that Kerouac was an American Catholic author – for example, virtually every page of his diary bore a sketch of a crucifix, a prayer, or an appeal to Christ to be forgiven.

In the spring of 1951, while pregnant, Joan Haverty left and divorced Kerouac. In February 1952, she gave birth to Kerouac's only child, Jan Kerouac, whom he acknowledged as his daughter after a blood test confirmed it nine years later. For the next several years Kerouac continued writing and traveling, taking long trips through the U.S. and Mexico. He often experienced episodes of heavy drinking and depression. During this period, he finished drafts of what became ten more novels, including The Subterraneans, Doctor Sax, Tristessa, and Desolation Angels, which chronicle many of the events of these years.

Despite being friends, Kerouac and Ginsberg often took opposing sides of electoral politics. In 1952, Kerouac endorsed the Old Right candidate Robert A. Taft of the Republican Party, while Ginsberg expressed support of Adlai Stevenson II of the Democratic Party.

In 1953, he lived mostly in New York City, having a brief but passionate affair with Alene Lee, an African-American woman, and member of the Beat generation. Alene was the basis for the character named "Mardou" in the novel The Subterraneans, and Irene May in Book of Dreams and Big Sur. At the request of his editors, Kerouac changed the setting of the novel from New York to San Francisco.

In 1954, Kerouac discovered Dwight Goddard's A Buddhist Bible at the San Jose Library, which marked the beginning of his study of Buddhism. Between 1955 and 1956, he lived on and off with his sister, whom he called "Nin," and her husband, Paul Blake, at their home outside of Rocky Mount, North Carolina ("Testament, Va." in his works) where he meditated on, and studied, Buddhism. He wrote Some of the Dharma, an imaginative, experimental treatise on Buddhism, demonstrating a wide-ranging engagement with numerous schools of Buddhism. He references such figures as Milarepa, Sariputa, and Zen-master Dogen. This book is the major artifact of Kerouac's confrontation with the Buddha's teaching. He read some texts translated by the Pali Text Society. However, Kerouac had earlier taken an interest in Eastern thought. In 1946 he read Heinrich Zimmer's Myths and Symbols in Indian Art and Civilization. In 1955, Kerouac wrote a biography of Siddhartha Gautama, titled Wake Up: A Life of the Buddha, which was unpublished during his lifetime, but eventually serialized in Tricycle: The Buddhist Review, 1993–95. It was published by Viking in September 2008.

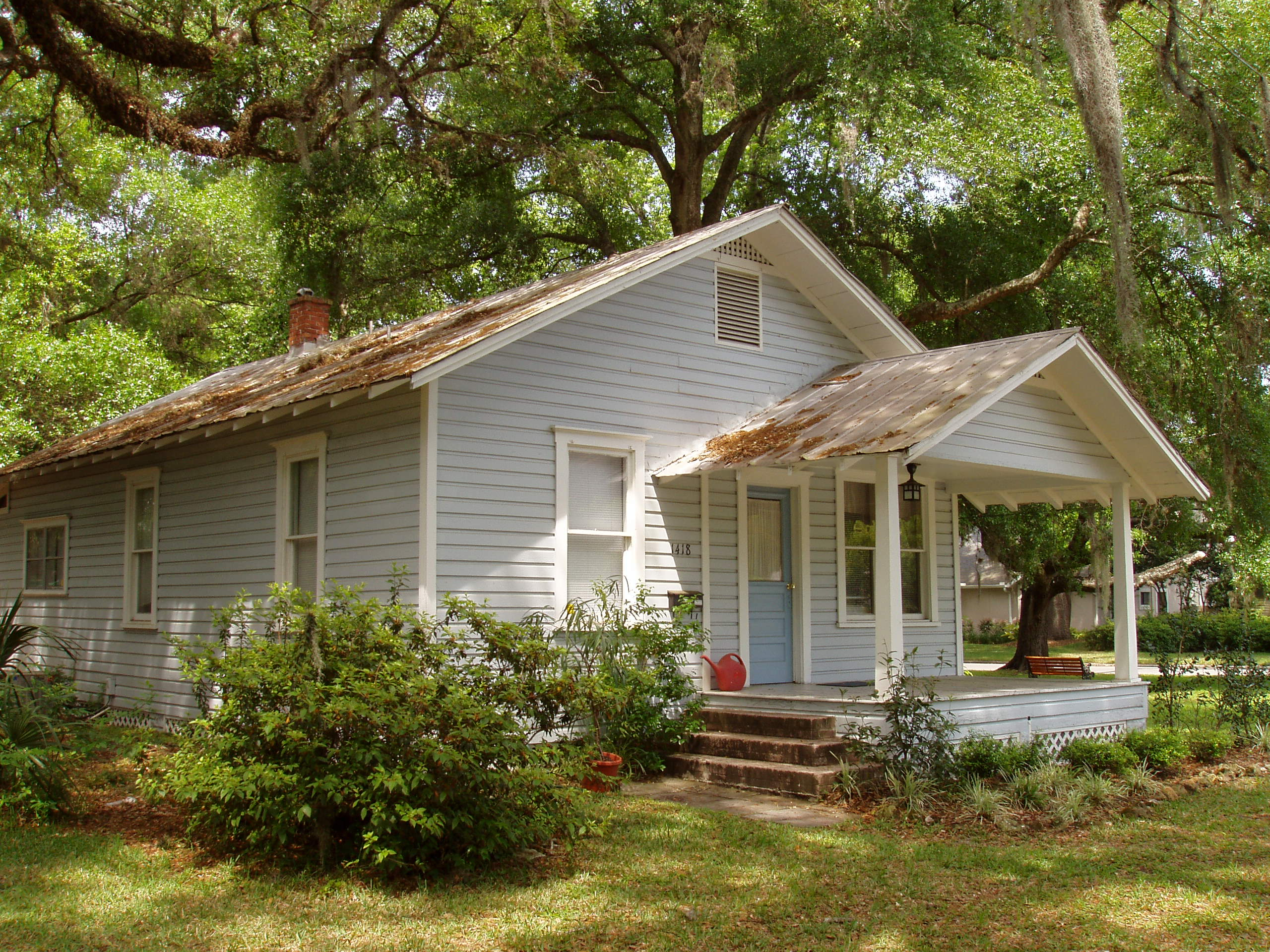
House in College Park in Orlando, Florida, where Kerouac lived and wrote The Dharma Bums

Though largely apolitical himself, Kerouac received ill-will from both sides of the political spectrum, the right disdaining his association with drugs and sexual libertinism and the left contemptuous of his anti-communism and Catholicism; characteristically, he watched the 1954 Senate McCarthy hearings smoking marijuana and rooting for the anti-communist crusader, Senator Joseph McCarthy. In Desolation Angels he wrote, "when I went to Columbia all they tried to teach us was Marx, as if I cared" (considering Marxism, like Freudianism, to be an illusory tangent). Kerouac, a traditionalist at heart and never a liberal, didn't truly drift rightward. His scope of interest was universal human themes, not politics. By the 1960s, as other Beat poets swung left and immersed themselves in hippie culture, he seemed more apolitical in contrast. Burroughs, who was close to Kerouac, observed that he steadfastly maintained "very traditional values, always was conservative."

In 1957, after being rejected by several other publishers, On the Road was finally purchased by Viking Press, which demanded major revisions prior to publication. Many of the most sexually explicit passages were removed and, fearing libel suits, pseudonyms were used for the book's "characters." These revisions have often led to criticisms of the alleged spontaneity of Kerouac's style.

=== Later career: 1957–1969 ===
In July 1957, Kerouac moved to a small house at 1418½ Clouser Avenue in the College Park section of Orlando, Florida, to await the release of On the Road. Weeks later, a review of the book by Gilbert Millstein appeared in The New York Times proclaiming Kerouac the voice of a new generation. Kerouac was hailed as a major American writer. His friendship with Allen Ginsberg, William S. Burroughs and Gregory Corso, among others, became a notorious representation of the Beat Generation. The term Beat Generation was invented by Kerouac during a conversation held with fellow novelist Herbert Huncke. Huncke used the term "beat" to describe a person with little money and few prospects. Kerouac's fame came as an unmanageable surge that would ultimately be his undoing.

Kerouac's novel is often described as the defining work of the post-World War II Beat Generation and Kerouac came to be called "King of the Beats", a term with which he never felt comfortable. He once observed, "I'm not a beatnik. I'm a Catholic", showing the reporter a painting of Pope Paul VI and saying, "You know who painted that? Me."

The success of On the Road brought Kerouac instant fame. His celebrity status brought publishers desiring unwanted manuscripts that were previously rejected before its publication. After nine months, he no longer felt safe in public. He was badly beaten by three men outside the San Remo Cafe at 189 Bleecker Street in New York City one night. Neal Cassady, possibly as a result of his new notoriety as the central character of the book, was set up and arrested for selling marijuana.

In response, Kerouac chronicled parts of his own experience with Buddhism, as well as some of his adventures with Gary Snyder and other San Francisco–area poets, in The Dharma Bums, set in California and Washington and published in 1958. It was written in Orlando between November 26 and December 7, 1957. To begin writing Dharma Bums, Kerouac typed onto a ten-foot length of teleprinter paper, to avoid interrupting his flow for paper changes, as he had done six years previously for On the Road.

Kerouac was demoralized by criticism of Dharma Bums from such respected figures in the American field of Buddhism as Zen teachers Ruth Fuller Sasaki and Alan Watts. He wrote to Snyder, referring to a meeting with D. T. Suzuki, that "even Suzuki was looking at me through slitted eyes as though I was a monstrous imposter." He passed up the opportunity to reunite with Snyder in California, and explained to Philip Whalen "I'd be ashamed to confront you and Gary now I've become so decadent and drunk and don't give a shit. I'm not a Buddhist any more." In further reaction to their criticism, he quoted part of Abe Green's café recitation, Thrasonical Yawning in the Abattoir of the Soul: "A gaping, rabid congregation, eager to bathe, are washed over by the Font of Euphoria, and bask like protozoans in the celebrated light."

Kerouac used earnings from On the Road to purchase the first of three homes in Northport, New York — a wood-framed Victorian on Gilbert Street that he shared with his mother, Gabrielle. They moved there in March 1958 and stayed in Northport for six years, moving twice during that time.

Kerouac also wrote and narrated a beat movie titled Pull My Daisy (1959), directed by Robert Frank and Alfred Leslie. It starred poets Allen Ginsberg and Gregory Corso, musician David Amram and painter Larry Rivers among others. Originally to be called The Beat Generation, the title was changed at the last moment when MGM released a film by the same name in July 1959 that sensationalized beatnik culture.

The television series Route 66 (1960–1964), featuring two untethered young men "on the road" in a Corvette seeking adventure and fueling their travels by apparently plentiful temporary jobs in the various U.S. locales framing the anthology-styled stories, gave the impression of being a commercially sanitized misappropriation of Kerouac's story model for On the Road. Even the leads, Buz and Todd, bore a resemblance to the dark, athletic Kerouac and the blonde Cassady/Moriarty, respectively. Kerouac felt he'd been conspicuously ripped off by Route 66 creator Stirling Silliphant and sought to sue him, CBS, the Screen Gems TV production company, and sponsor Chevrolet, but was counseled against proceeding.

John Antonelli's 1985 documentary Kerouac, the Movie begins and ends with footage of Kerouac reading from On the Road and Visions of Cody on The Steve Allen Show in November 1959. In response to Allen's question "How would you define the word 'beat?'", Kerouac responds "well ... sympathetic."

During the 1964 United States presidential election, Hunter S. Thompson noted that Kerouac was a staunch supporter of Republican Senator Barry Goldwater. The election would go on to be a landslide victory for incumbent Lyndon B. Johnson.

In 1965, he met the poet Youenn Gwernig who was a Breton American like him in New York, and they became friends. Gwernig used to translate his Breton language poems into English so that Kerouac could read and understand them: "Meeting with Jack Kerouac in 1965, for instance, was a decisive turn. Since he could not speak Breton he asked me: 'Would you not write some of your poems in English? I'd really like to read them! ... ' So I wrote an Diri Dir – Stairs of Steel for him, and kept on doing so. That's why I often write my poems in Breton, French and English."

During these years, Kerouac suffered the loss of his older sister to a heart attack in 1964 and his mother suffered a paralyzing stroke in 1966. Kerouac moved in with his mother in Hyannis, Massachusetts, for almost a year in 1966. In 1968, Neal Cassady also died while in Mexico.

Despite the role that his literary work played in inspiring the counterculture movement of the 1960s, Kerouac was openly critical of it. Arguments over the movement, which Kerouac believed was only an excuse to be "spiteful," also resulted in him splitting with Ginsberg by 1968.

Also in 1968, Kerouac last appeared on television for an episode of Firing Line, produced and hosted by William F. Buckley Jr. Seemingly intoxicated, he affirmed his Catholicism and talked about the counterculture of the 1960s.

=== Death ===
On the morning of October 20, 1969, in St. Petersburg, Florida, Kerouac was working on a book about his father's print shop. He suddenly felt nauseated and went to the bathroom, where he began to vomit blood. Kerouac was taken to St. Anthony's Hospital, suffering from an esophageal hemorrhage. He received several transfusions in an attempt to make up for the loss of blood, and doctors subsequently attempted surgery, but a damaged liver prevented his blood from clotting. He never regained consciousness after the operation, and died at the hospital at 5:15 the following morning, at the age of 47. His cause of death was listed as an internal hemorrhage (bleeding esophageal varices) caused by cirrhosis, the result of longtime alcohol abuse. A possible contributing factor was an untreated hernia he had suffered in a bar fight several weeks earlier.

Kerouac's funeral was held at St. Jean Baptiste Church in Lowell, Massachusetts. He was buried at Edson Cemetery.

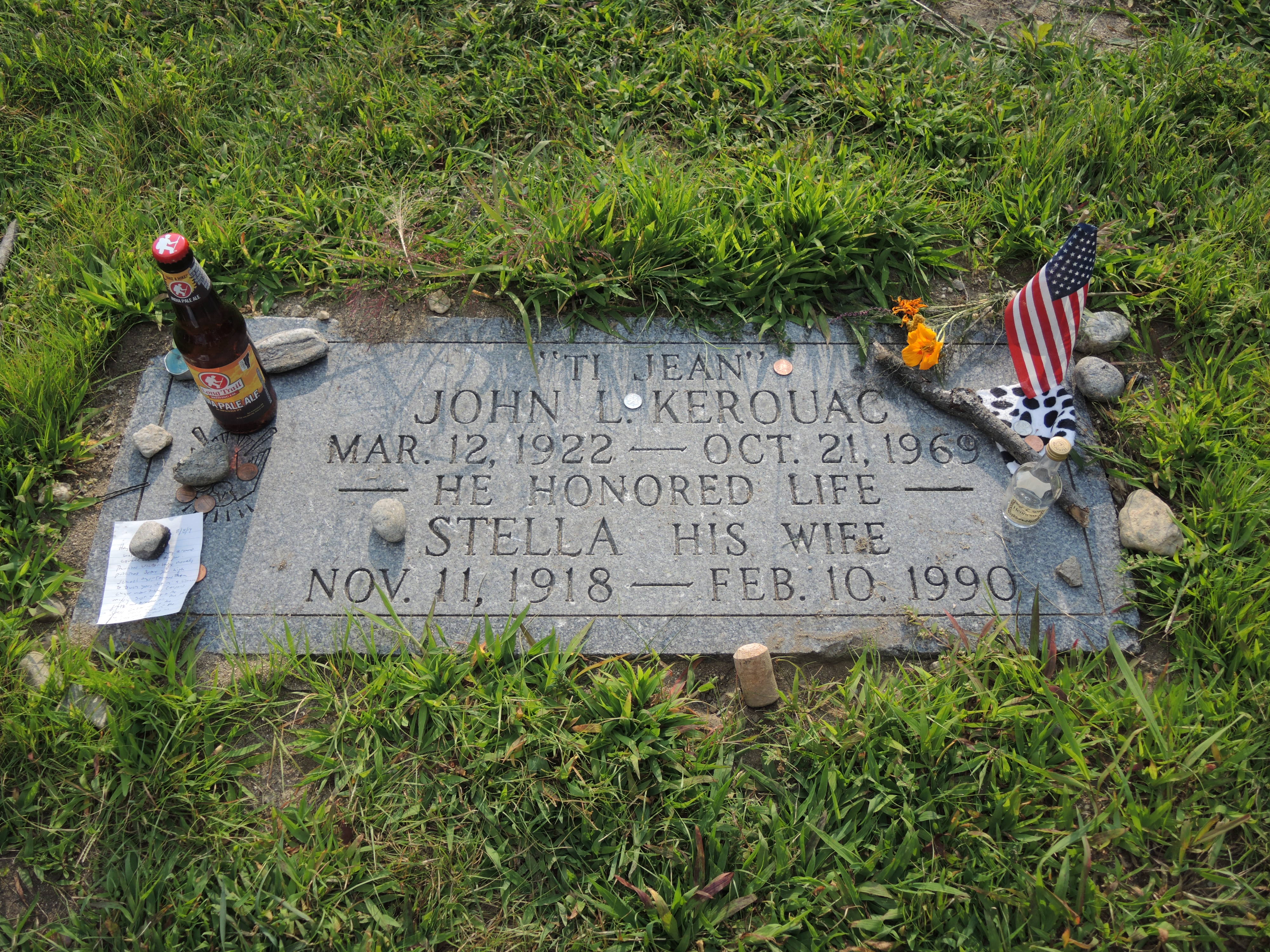
Grave in Edson Cemetery, Lowell

At the time of his death, Kerouac was living with his third wife, Stella Sampas Kerouac. His mother, Gabrielle, inherited most of his estate.

== Style ==
Kerouac is generally considered to be the father of the Beat movement, although he disliked such labels. He often referred to his style as "spontaneous prose". Although Kerouac's prose was spontaneous and purportedly without edits, he primarily wrote autobiographical novels (or roman à clef) based upon actual events from his life and the people with whom he interacted. This approach is reflected also by his plot structure: his narratives were not heavily focused on traditional plot structures. Instead, his works often revolved around a series of episodic encounters, road trips, and personal reflections. The emphasis was on the characters' experiences and the exploration of themes such as freedom, rebellion, and the search for meaning.

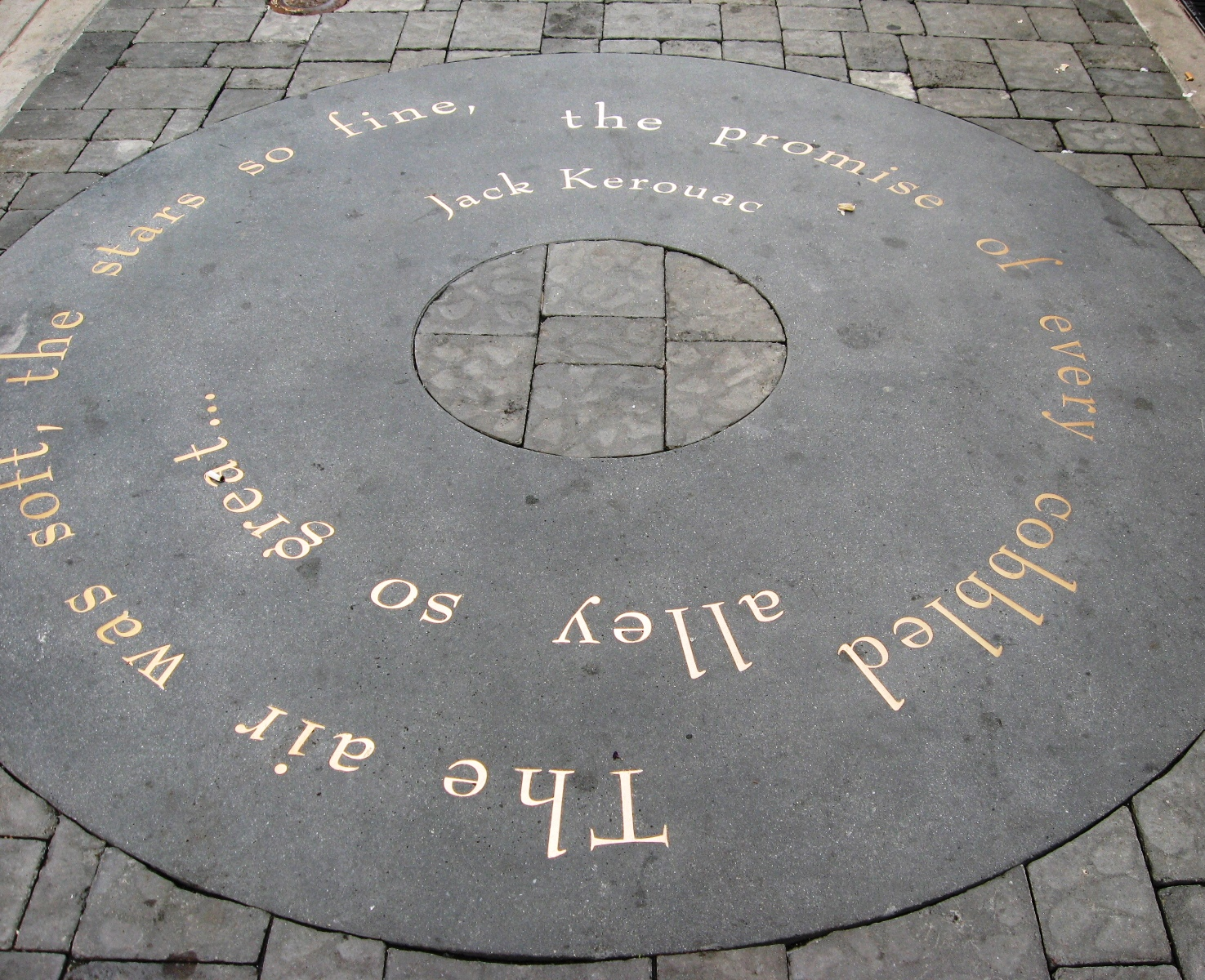
On the Road excerpt in the center of Jack Kerouac Alley

Many of his books exemplified this spontaneous approach, including On the Road, Visions of Cody, Visions of Gerard, Big Sur, and The Subterraneans. The central features of this writing method were the ideas of breath (borrowed from jazz and from Buddhist meditation breathing), improvising words over the inherent structures of mind and language, and limited revision. Connected with this idea of breath was the elimination of the period, substituting instead a long connecting dash. As such, the phrases occurring between dashes might resemble improvisational jazz licks. When spoken, the words take on a certain musical rhythm and tempo.

Kerouac greatly admired and was influenced by Gary Snyder. The Dharma Bums contains accounts of a mountain climbing trip Kerouac took with Snyder, and includes excerpts of letters from Snyder. While living with Snyder outside Mill Valley, California, in 1956, Kerouac worked on a book about him, which he considered calling Visions of Gary. (This eventually became Dharma Bums, which Kerouac described as "mostly about [Snyder].") That summer, Kerouac took a job as a fire lookout on Desolation Peak in the North Cascades in Washington, after hearing Snyder's and Whalen's stories of working as fire spotters. Kerouac described the experience in Desolation Angels and later in "Alone on a Mountaintop" (published in Lonesome Traveler) and The Dharma Bums.

Kerouac would go on for hours, often drunk, to friends and strangers about his method. Allen Ginsberg, initially unimpressed, would later be one of his great proponents, and it was Kerouac's free-flowing prose method that inspired the composition of Ginsberg's poem Howl. It was at about the time of The Subterraneans that he was encouraged by Ginsberg and others to formally explain his style. Of his expositions of the spontaneous prose method, the most concise was "Belief and Technique for Modern Prose"., a list of 30 "essential" maxims.

... and I shambled after as usual as I've been doing all my life after people who interest me, because the only people for me are the mad ones, the ones who are mad to live, mad to talk, mad to be saved, desirous of everything at the same time, the ones who never yawn or say a commonplace thing, but burn, burn, burn like fabulous yellow roman candles exploding like spiders across the stars and in the middle you see the blue centerlight pop and everybody goes "Awww!"

— On the Road

Some said that at times Kerouac's writing technique did not produce lively or energetic prose: Truman Capote said of it, "That's not writing, it's typing". This view was countered by Carolyn Cassady and others, who maintained that he constantly rewrote and revised his work.

Although the body of Kerouac's work has been published in English, in addition to his poetry and letters to friends and family, he also wrote unpublished works of fiction in French. These include two novels, La nuit est ma femme (written February–March, 1951) and Sur le chemin (written December, 1952), as well as large sections of Maggie Cassidy (written in January–February, 1953). Kerouac's French texts were published together in a volume entitled La vie est d'hommage (Boréal, 2016, edited and compiled by Jean-Christophe Cloutier). In 1996, the Nouvelle Revue Française had already published excerpts and an article on "La nuit est ma femme", and scholar Paul Maher Jr., in his biography Kerouac: His Life and Work', discussed Sur le chemin. The novella, completed in five days in Mexico during December 1952, is a telling example of Kerouac's attempts at writing in his first language, a language he often called Canuck French.

The Unknown Kerouac, edited by Todd Tietchen, includes a translation of La nuit est ma femme and the completed translation of Sur le Chemin under the title Old Bull in the Bowery. La nuit est ma femme was written in early 1951 and completed a few days or weeks before he began the original English version of On the Road, as many scholars, such as Paul Maher Jr., Joyce Johnson, Hassan Melehy, and Gabriel Anctil have pointed out.

=== Influences ===
Kerouac's early writing, particularly his first novel The Town and the City, was more conventional, and bore the strong influence of Thomas Wolfe. The technique Kerouac developed that later gained him notoriety was heavily influenced by the prolific explosion of jazz, especially the bebop genre established by Charlie Parker, Dizzy Gillespie, Thelonious Monk, and others. Later, he included ideas he developed from his Buddhist studies that began with Gary Snyder., as well as the Joan Anderson letter written by Neal Cassady. The Diamond Sutra was the most important Buddhist text for Kerouac, and "probably one of the three or four most influential things he ever read". In 1955, he began an intensive study of this sutra, in a repeating weekly cycle, devoting one day to each of the six Pāramitās, and the seventh to the concluding passage on Samādhi. This was his sole reading on Desolation Peak, and he hoped by this means to condition his mind to emptiness, and possibly to have a vision.

James Joyce was also a literary influence on Kerouac and he alludes to Joyce's work more than any other author. Kerouac had high esteem for Joyce and he often used Joyce's stream-of-consciousness technique. Regarding On the Road, he wrote in a letter to Ginsberg, "I can tell you now as I look back on the flood of language. It is like Ulysses and should be treated with the same gravity." Additionally, Kerouac admired Joyce's experimental use of language, as seen in his novel Visions of Cody, which uses an unconventional narrative as well as a multiplicity of authorial voices.

== Legacy ==
Kerouac and his literary works had a major impact on the popular rock music of the 1960s. Artists including Bob Dylan, the Beatles, Patti Smith, Tom Waits, the Grateful Dead, and the Doors all credit Kerouac as a significant influence on their music and lifestyles. This is especially so with members of the Doors, Jim Morrison and Ray Manzarek, who quote Jack Kerouac and his novel On the Road as one of the band's greatest influences. In his book Light My Fire: My Life with The Doors, Ray Manzarek, keyboard player of The Doors, wrote "I suppose if Jack Kerouac had never written On the Road, The Doors would never have existed."

The English rock supergroup Bad Company titled their 1979 album Desolation Angels after Kerouac's 1965 novel of the same name.

The alternative rock band 10,000 Maniacs wrote a song bearing his name, "Hey Jack Kerouac" on their 1987 album In My Tribe. Hip-hop group the Beastie Boys mention Kerouac in their 1989 song, "3-Minute Rule", from the album Paul's Boutique. The 2000 Barenaked Ladies song, "Baby Seat", from the album Maroon, references Kerouac. The power pop band Weezer mentions Kerouac in "Holiday", a song on the group's debut album, the self-titled Weezer.

In 1974, the Jack Kerouac School of Disembodied Poetics was opened in his honor by Allen Ginsberg and Anne Waldman at Naropa University, a private Buddhist university in Boulder, Colorado. The school offers a BA in Writing and Literature, MFAs in Writing & Poetics and Creative Writing, and a summer writing program.

In 1980, the film Heart Beat was released into theaters. Starring John Heard (as Kerouac), Nick Nolte (as Cassady) and Sissy Spacek (as Carolyn Cassady), the movie relates a love triangle between the main characters while delving into the work and life of Kerouac and Cassady around the writing of On the Road.

From 1978 to 1992, Joy Walsh published 28 issues of a magazine devoted to Kerouac, Moody Street Irregulars.

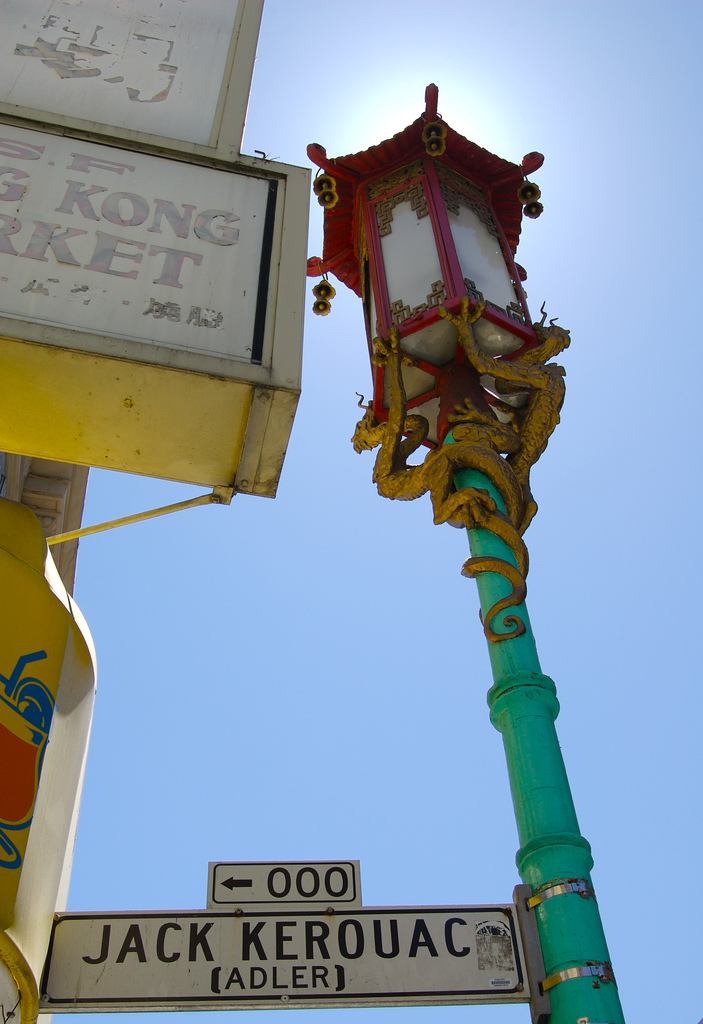
Jack Kerouac Alley in Chinatown, San Francisco

Kerouac's French-Canadian origins inspired a 1987 National Film Board of Canada docudrama, Jack Kerouac's Road: A Franco-American Odyssey, directed by Acadian poet Herménégilde Chiasson. Other tributes in French Canada include the 1972 biography by novelist Victor-Lévy Beaulieu Jack Kérouac (essai-poulet), translated as Jack Kerouac: a chicken-essay, the second in a series of works by Beaulieu on his literary forefathers, and two songs that came out within months of each other in 1987 and 1988: "Sur la route" by Pierre Flynn, and "L'ange vagabond" by Richard Séguin.

In the mid-1980s, Kerouac Park was placed in downtown Lowell, Massachusetts.

A street, rue Jack-Kerouac, is named after him in Quebec City, as well as in the hamlet of Kerouac, Lanmeur, Brittany. An annual Kerouac festival was established in Lanmeur in 2010. In the 1980s, the city of San Francisco named a one-way street, Jack Kerouac Alley, in his honor in Chinatown.

The character Hank in David Cronenberg's 1991 film Naked Lunch is based on Kerouac.

Kerouac was featured in clothing brand Gap's 1993 "Who Wore Khakis" campaign, using a black and white photo of the poet taken in 1958 in Greenwich Village.

In 1997, the house on Clouser Avenue where The Dharma Bums was written was purchased by a newly formed non-profit group, The Jack Kerouac Writers in Residence Project of Orlando, Inc. This group provides opportunities for aspiring writers to live in the same house in which Kerouac was inspired, with room and board covered for three months. In 1998, the Chicago Tribune published a story by journalist Oscar J. Corral that described a simmering legal dispute between Kerouac's family and the executor of daughter Jan Kerouac's estate, Gerald Nicosia. The article, citing legal documents, showed that Kerouac's estate, worth $91 at the time of his death, was worth $10 million in 1998.

In 2005, Kerouac was mentioned in the single "Nolwenn Ohwo!" by French pop singer-songwriter Nolwenn Leroy, released on her album Histoires Naturelles. That same year singer-songwriter Jimmy LaFave recorded "Bohemian Cowboy Blues" which opened with the lines, "Jack kerouac took old highway 66, Traveled across the great divide Wrote books and poems as he rambled, Confessions that he couldn't hide."

In 2007, Kerouac was posthumously awarded an honorary Doctor of Letters degree from the University of Massachusetts Lowell.

In 2009, the movie One Fast Move or I'm Gone – Kerouac's Big Sur was released. It chronicles the time in Kerouac's life that led to his novel Big Sur, with actors, writers, artists, and close friends giving their insight into the book. The movie also describes the people and places on which Kerouac based his characters and settings, including the cabin in Bixby Canyon. An album released to accompany the movie, "One Fast Move or I'm Gone", features Benjamin Gibbard (Death Cab for Cutie) and Jay Farrar (Son Volt) performing songs based on Kerouac's Big Sur.

In 2010, during the first weekend of October, the 25th anniversary of the literary festival "Lowell Celebrates Kerouac" was held in Kerouac's birthplace of Lowell, Massachusetts. It featured walking tours, literary seminars, and musical performances focused on Kerouac's work and that of the Beat Generation.

In the 2010s, there was a surge in films based on the Beat Generation. Kerouac has been depicted in the films Howl and Kill Your Darlings. A feature film version of On the Road was released internationally in 2012, and was directed by Walter Salles and produced by Francis Ford Coppola. Independent filmmaker Michael Polish directed Big Sur, based on the novel, with Jean-Marc Barr cast as Kerouac. The film was released in 2013.

A species of Indian platygastrid wasp that is phoretic (hitch-hiking) on grasshoppers is named after him as Mantibaria kerouaci.

In October 2015, a crater on the planet Mercury was named in his honor.

In 2021, Jack Kerouac's literary legacy influenced contemporary fashion when Kim Jones (designer) based Dior Men's Fall 2022 collection on Kerouac's 1957 novel On the Road. Presented in London, the collection explored the novel's themes of freedom, travel, self-discovery, and the spirit of the open road, reinterpreting them through a fusion of American sportswear and Dior's couture heritage. Jones also incorporated illustrations from the dust jackets of Kerouac's books into the garments, while the runway featured a recreation of Kerouac's iconic continuous manuscript scroll on which On the Road was originally typed. Describing the collection, Jones cited Kerouac's vision of movement, optimism, and youthful curiosity as a continuing source of inspiration, reflecting the novel's lasting influence beyond literature and into contemporary fashion and popular culture.

The Cadets Drum and Bugle Corps based their 2022 production Rearview Mirror off of Kerouac's travels across America and his novel On the Road.

The 2023 song, "Walking Each Other Home," by country singer-songwriter, Dierks Bentley, opens with the lyrics "Kerouac gave me a book of poems."

In 2025 country singer-songwriter, Zach Bryan, purchased the former St. Jean Baptiste Church, where Kerouac's funeral was held, in Lowell Massachusetts for a Jack Kerouac Center. Bryan also purchased the original On the Road manuscript from The Jim Irsay Collection auction. Bryan's song, Burn, Burn, Burn, was inspired by Kerouac.

From March 5-May 16, 2026, The Grolier Club, New York, exhibited Running Through Heaven: Visions of Jack Kerouac" featuring first editions, books and drawings.

== Works ==
=== Poetry ===
While he is best known for his novels, Kerouac also wrote poetry. Kerouac said that he wanted "to be considered as a jazz poet blowing a long blues in an afternoon jazz session on Sunday.". Many of Kerouac's poems follow the style of his free-flowing, uninhibited prose, also incorporating elements of jazz and Buddhism. "Mexico City Blues," a collection of poems published in 1959, is made up of 242 choruses following the rhythms of jazz. In much of his poetry, to achieve a jazz-like rhythm, Kerouac made use of the long dash in place of a period. Several examples of this can be seen in "Mexico City Blues":

Everything
Is Ignorant of its own emptiness—
Anger
Doesnt like to be reminded of fits—

— fragment from 113th Chorus

Other poems by Kerouac, such as "Bowery Blues," incorporate jazz rhythms with Buddhist themes of Saṃsāra, the cycle of life and death, and Samadhi, the concentration of composing the mind. Also, following the jazz / blues tradition, Kerouac's poetry features repetition and themes of the troubles and sense of loss experienced in life.

=== Posthumous editions ===
In 2007, to coincide with the 50th anniversary of On the Road's publishing, Viking issued two new editions: On the Road: The Original Scroll and On the Road: 50th Anniversary Edition. By far the more significant is Scroll, a transcription of the original draft typed as one long paragraph on sheets of tracing paper which Kerouac taped together to form a 120-foot (37 m) scroll. The text is more sexually explicit than Viking allowed to be published in 1957, and also uses the real names of Kerouac's friends rather than the fictional names he later substituted. Indianapolis Colts owner Jim Irsay paid $2.43 million for the original scroll and allowed an exhibition tour that concluded at the end of 2009. The other new issue, 50th Anniversary Edition, is a reissue of the 40th anniversary issue under an updated title.

The Kerouac/Burroughs manuscript And the Hippos Were Boiled in Their Tanks was published for the first time on November 1, 2008, by Grove Press. Previously, a fragment of the manuscript had been published in the Burroughs compendium, Word Virus.

Les Éditions du Boréal, a Montreal-based publishing house, obtained rights from Kerouac's estate to publish a collection of works titled La vie est d'hommage (it was released in April 2016). It includes 16 previously unpublished works, in French, including a novella, Sur le chemin, La nuit est ma femme, and large sections of Maggie Cassidy originally written in French. Both Sur le chemin and La nuit est ma femme have also been translated to English by Jean-Christophe Cloutier, in collaboration with Kerouac, and were published in 2016 by the Library of America in The Unknown Kerouac.

=== Literary executorship and representation ===
Kerouac's literary executor, after the death of Kerouac’s direct family members, was John Sampas, whose sister had been married to Kerouac at the time of his death in 1969. In 2017 Sampas’ son took over executorship of the Kerouac estate.

== Discography ==
=== Studio albums ===
- Poetry for the Beat Generation (with Steve Allen) (1959)
- Blues and Haikus (with Al Cohn and Zoot Sims) (1959)
- Readings by Jack Kerouac on the Beat Generation (1960)

=== Compilation albums ===
- The Jack Kerouac Collection (1990) [Box] (Audio CD collection of three studio albums)
- Jack Kerouac Reads On the Road (1999)
