= Beatnik =

Media stereotype based on characteristics of the Beat Generation

Beat, Beat, Beat (1959) by William F. Brown

Beatniks were members of a social movement in the mid-20th century, who subscribed to an anti-materialistic lifestyle. They rejected the conformity and consumerism of mainstream American culture and expressed themselves through various forms of art, such as literature, poetry, music, and painting. They also experimented with spirituality, drugs, sexuality, and travel. The term "beatnik" was coined by San Francisco Chronicle columnist Herb Caen in 1958, as a derogatory label for the followers of the Beat Generation, a group of influential writers and artists who emerged during the era of the Silent Generation's maturing, from as early as 1946 to as late as 1963; however, the subculture was at its most prevalent in the mid-to-late 1950s. This lifestyle of anti-consumerism may have been influenced by their generation living in extreme poverty in the Great Depression during their formative years, seeing slightly older people serve in WWII and being influenced by the rise of left-wing politics and the spread of Communism. The name was inspired by the Russian suffix "-nik", which was used to denote members of various political or social groups. The term "beat" originally was used by Jack Kerouac in 1948 to describe his social circle of friends and fellow writers, such as Allen Ginsberg, William S. Burroughs, and Neal Cassady. Kerouac said that "beat" had multiple meanings, such as "beaten down", "beatific", "beat up", and "beat out". He also associated it with the musical term "beat", which referred to the rhythmic patterns of jazz, a genre that influenced many beatniks.

Beatniks often were stereotyped as wearing black clothing, berets, sunglasses, and goatees, and speaking in hip slang that incorporated words like "cool", "dig", "groovy", and "square". They frequented coffeehouses, bookstores, bars, and clubs, where they listened to jazz, read poetry, discussed philosophy, and engaged in political activism. Some of the most famous beatnik venues were the Six Gallery in San Francisco, where Ginsberg first read his poem "Howl" in 1955; the Gaslight Cafe in New York City, where many poets performed; and the City Lights Bookstore, also in San Francisco, where Kerouac's novel On the Road was published in 1957. Beatniks also traveled across the country and abroad, seeking new experiences and inspiration. Some of their destinations included Mexico, Morocco, India, Japan, and France.

Beatniks had a significant impact on American culture and society as they challenged the norms and values of their time. They influenced many aspects of art, literature, music, film, fashion, and language. They also inspired many social movements and subcultures that followed them, such as the hippies, the counterculture, the New Left, the environmental movement, and the LGBT movement. Some of the more notable figures who were influenced by or associated with beatniks include The Beatles, Bob Dylan, Ken Kesey, Timothy Leary, and Andy Warhol. Beatniks have been portrayed or parodied in many works of fiction, such as The Beat Generation, The Beatniks, and The Many Loves of Dobie Gillis.

== History ==
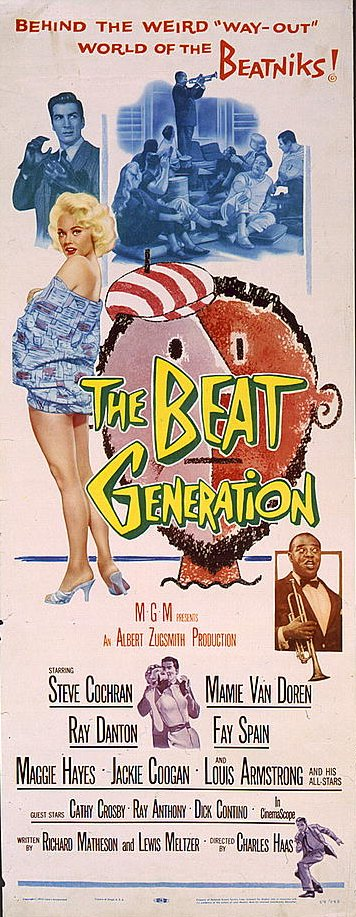
Poster for The Beat Generation (1959)

In 1948, Jack Kerouac introduced the phrase "Beat Generation", generalizing from his social circle to characterize the underground, anti-conformist youth gathering in New York City at that time. The name came up in conversation with John Clellon Holmes, who published an early Beat Generation novel titled Go (1952), along with the manifesto This Is the Beat Generation in The New York Times Magazine. In 1954, Nolan Miller published his third novel Why I Am So Beat (Putnam), detailing the weekend parties of four students.

"Beat" came from underworld slang—the world of hustlers, drug addicts, and petty thieves—from which Allen Ginsberg and Kerouac sought inspiration. "Beat" was slang for "beaten down" or "downtrodden". However, to Kerouac and Ginsberg, it also had a spiritual connotation, as in "beatitude". Other adjectives discussed by Holmes and Kerouac were "found" and "furtive". Kerouac felt he had identified (and was the embodiment of) a new trend analogous to the influential Lost Generation.

In "Aftermath: The Philosophy of the Beat Generation", Kerouac criticized what he saw as a distortion of his visionary, spiritual ideas:

The Beat Generation, that was a vision that we had, John Clellon Holmes and I, and Allen Ginsberg in an even wilder way, in the late Forties, of a generation of crazy, illuminated hipsters suddenly rising and roaming America, serious, bumming and hitchhiking everywhere, ragged, beatific, beautiful in an ugly graceful new way—a vision gleaned from the way we had heard the word "beat" spoken on street corners on Times Square and in the Village, in other cities in the downtown city night of postwar America—beat, meaning down and out but full of intense conviction. We'd even heard old 1910 Daddy Hipsters of the streets speak the word that way, with a melancholy sneer. It never meant juvenile delinquents, it meant characters of a special spirituality who didn't gang up but were solitary Bartlebies staring out the dead wall window of our civilization ...

Kerouac explained what he meant by "beat" at a Brandeis Forum, "Is There A Beat Generation?", on November 8, 1958, at New York's Hunter College Playhouse. The seminar's panelists were Kerouac, James A. Wechsler, Princeton anthropologist Ashley Montagu and author Kingsley Amis. Wechsler, Montagu, and Amis wore suits, while Kerouac was clad in black jeans, ankle boots and a checkered shirt. Reading from a prepared text, Kerouac reflected on his beat beginnings:

It is because I am Beat, that is, I believe in beatitude and that God so loved the world that He gave His only begotten son to it ... Who knows, but that the universe is not one vast sea of compassion actually, the veritable holy honey, beneath all this show of personality and cruelty?

Kerouac's statement was later published as "The Origins of the Beat Generation" (Playboy, June 1959). In that article, Kerouac noted how his original beatific philosophy had been ignored amid maneuvers by several pundits, among them San Francisco newspaper columnist Herb Caen, to alter Kerouac's concept with jokes and jargon:

I went one afternoon to the church of my childhood and had a vision of what I must have really meant with "Beat"...the vision of the word Beat as being to mean beatific...People began to call themselves beatniks, beats, jazzniks, bopniks, buggies, and finally, I was called the "avatar" of all this.

In light of what he considered beat to mean and what beatnik had come to mean, Kerouac said to a reporter "I'm not a beatnik. I'm a Catholic", showing the reporter a painting of Pope Paul VI and saying "You know who painted that? Me."

== Stereotype ==
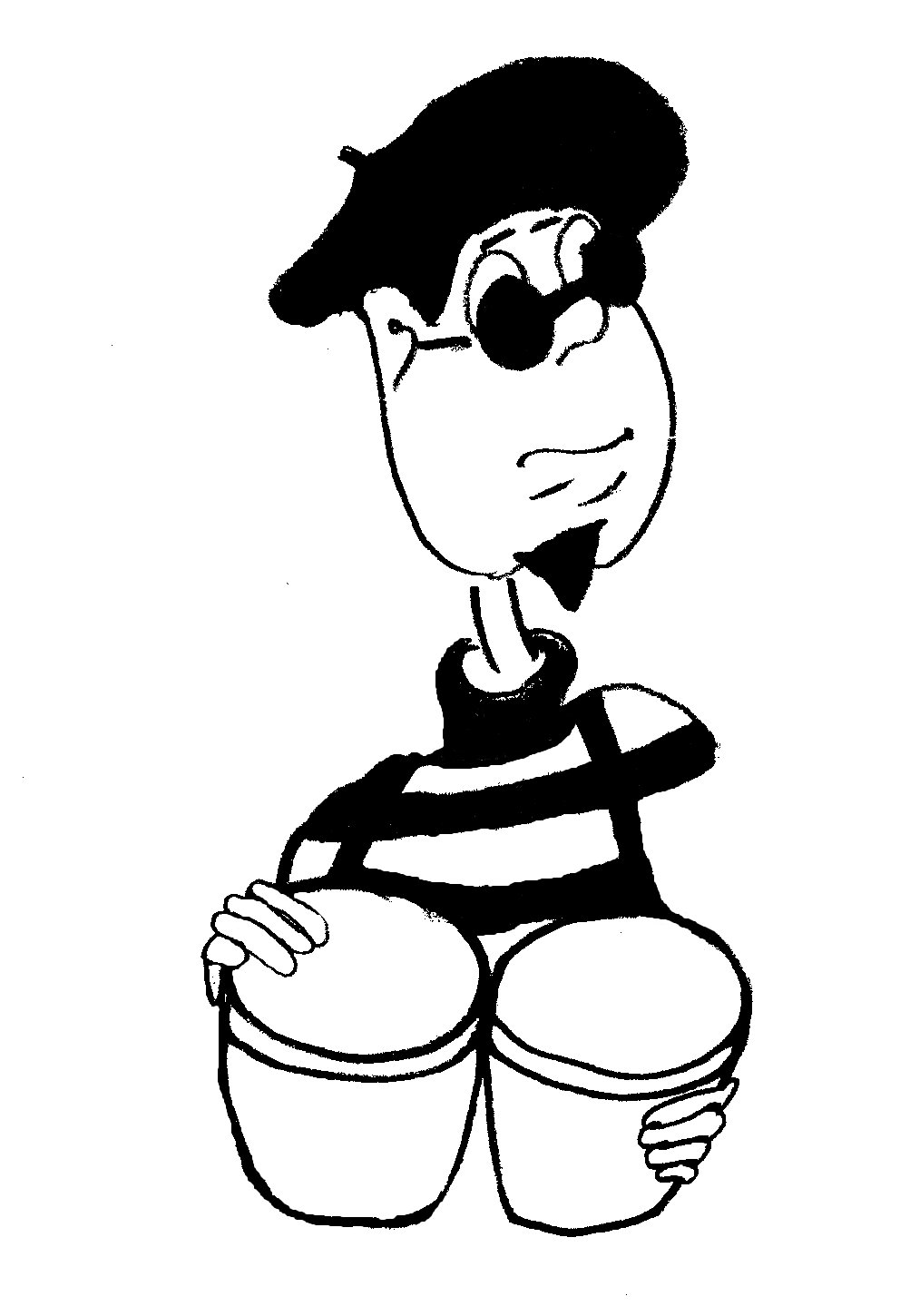
Stereotypical beatnik man

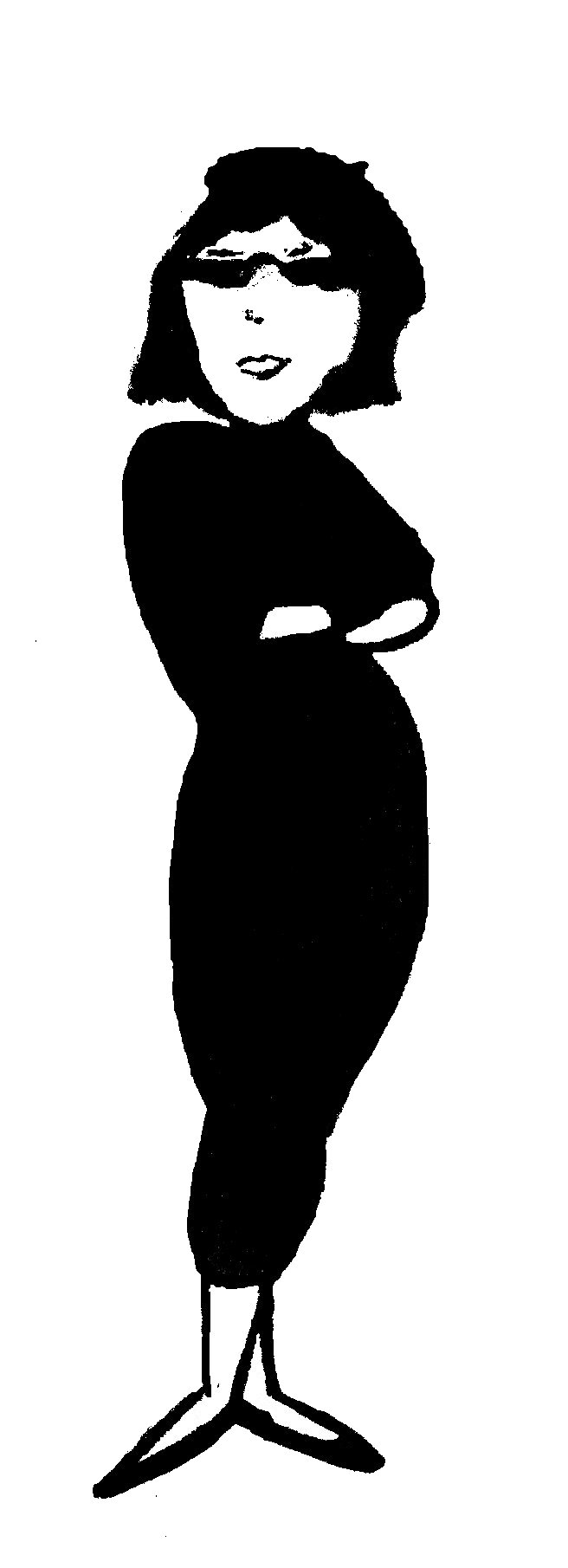
Stereotypical beatnik woman

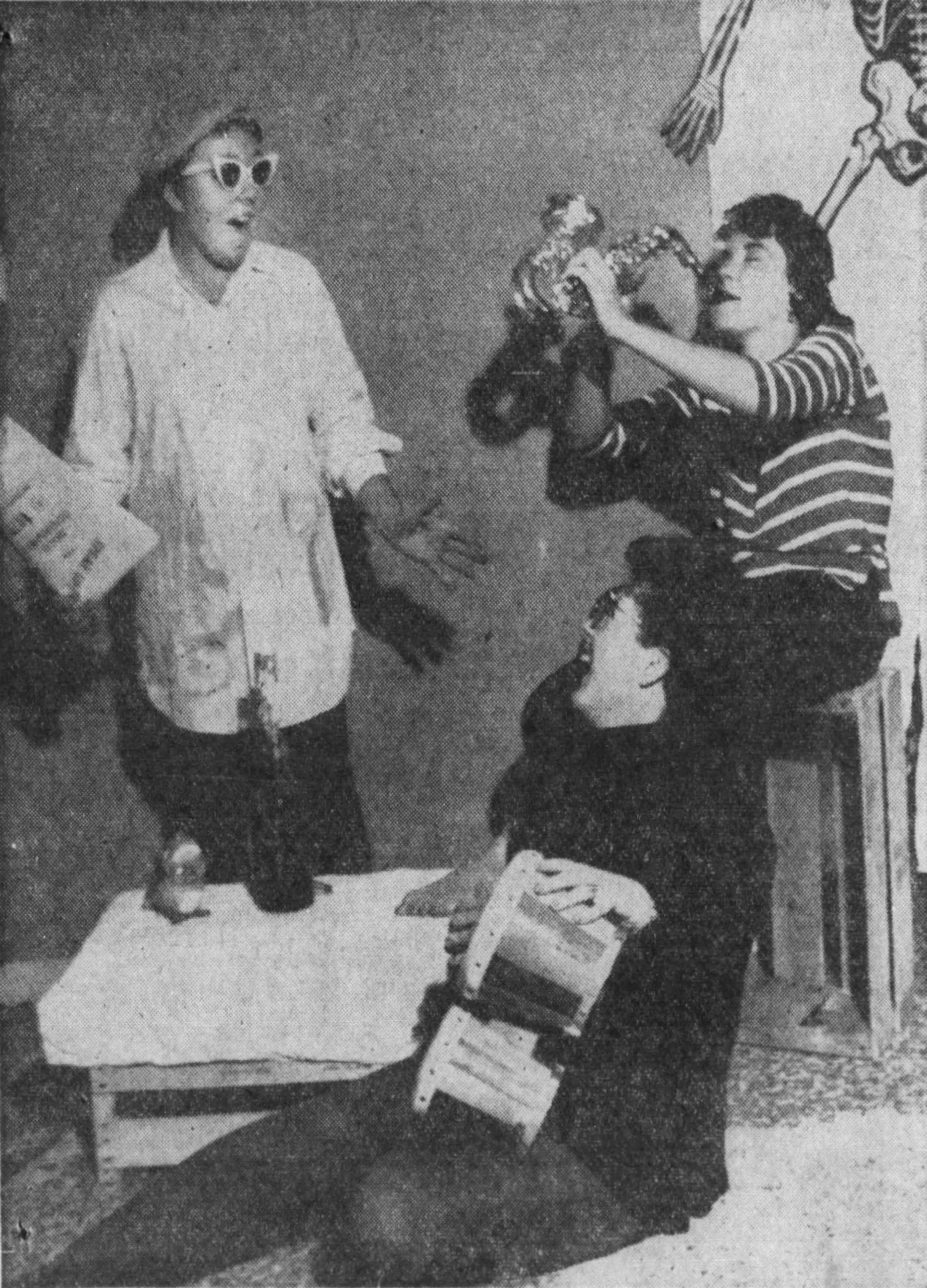
Beatnik stereotypes and fashion, including poetry recital to bongo and saxophone accompaniment.

In her memoir Minor Characters, Joyce Johnson described how the stereotype was absorbed into American culture:

"Beat Generation" sold books, sold black turtleneck sweaters and bongos, berets and dark glasses, sold a way of life that seemed like dangerous fun—thus to be either condemned or imitated. Suburban couples could have beatnik parties on Saturday nights and drink too much and fondle each other's wives.

Kerouac biographer Ann Charters noted that the term "Beat" was appropriated to become a Madison Avenue marketing tool:

The term caught on because it could mean anything. It could even be exploited in the affluent wake of the decade's extraordinary technological inventions. Almost immediately, for example, advertisements by "hip" record companies in New York used the idea of the Beat Generation to sell their new long-playing vinyl records.

Lee Streiff, an acquaintance of many members of the movement who went on to become one of its chroniclers, believed that the news media saddled the movement for the long term with a set of false images:

Reporters are not generally well-versed in artistic movements, or the history of literature or art. And most are certain that their readers, or viewers, are of limited intellectual ability and must have things explained simply, in any case. Thus, the reporters in the media tried to relate something that was new to already preexisting frameworks and images that were only vaguely appropriate in their efforts to explain and simplify. With a variety of oversimplified and conventional formulas at their disposal, they fell back on the nearest stereotypical approximation of what the phenomenon resembled, as they saw it. And even worse, they did not see it clearly and completely at that. They got a quotation here and a photograph there—and it was their job to wrap it up in a comprehensible package—and if it seemed to violate the prevailing mandatory conformist doctrine, they would also be obliged to give it a negative spin as well. And in this, they were aided and abetted by the Poetic Establishment of the day. Thus, what came out in the media: from newspapers, magazines, TV, and the movies, was a product of the stereotypes of the 30s and 40s—though garbled—of a cross between a 1920s Greenwich Village bohemian artist and a Bop musician, whose visual image was completed by mixing in Daliesque paintings, a beret, a Vandyck beard, a turtleneck sweater, a pair of sandals, and set of bongo drums. A few authentic elements were added to the collective image: poets reading their poems, for example, but even this was made unintelligible by making all of the poets speak in some kind of phony Bop idiom. The consequence is, that even though we may know now that these images do not accurately reflect the reality of the Beat movement, we still subconsciously look for them when we look back to the 50s. We have not even yet completely escaped the visual imagery that has been so insistently forced upon us.

== Etymology ==
The origin of the word "beatnik" is traditionally ascribed to Herb Caen from his column in the San Francisco Chronicle on April 2, 1958, where he wrote "Look magazine, preparing a picture spread on S.F.'s Beat Generation (oh, no, not AGAIN!), hosted a party in a No. Beach house for 50 Beatniks, and by the time word got around the sour grapevine, over 250 bearded cats and kits were on hand, slopping up Mike Cowles' free booze. They're only Beat, y'know, when it comes to work ..." It is claimed that Caen coined the term by adding the Yiddish suffix -nik (ultimately borrowed into Yiddish from Slavic languages) to Beat as in the Beat Generation. Nik, as a suffix was also in vogue due to the Sputnik, the first satellite to orbit the planet, in 1957. The suffix came to be used in colloquial synthetics such as Nogoodnik, etc.

An earlier source from 1954, or possibly 1957 after the launch of Sputnik, is ascribed to Ethel (Etya) Gechtoff, the well-known owner of a San Francisco Art Gallery.

Objecting to the term, Allen Ginsberg wrote to The New York Times to deplore "the foul word beatnik", commenting, "If beatniks and not illuminated Beat poets overrun this country, they will have been created not by Kerouac but by industries of mass communication which continue to brainwash man."

== Beat culture ==
In the vernacular of the period, "Beat" referred to Beat culture, attitude and literature; while "beatnik" referred to a stereotype found in cartoon drawings and (in some cases at worst) twisted, sometimes violent media characters. In 1995, film scholar Ray Carney wrote about the authentic beat attitude as differentiated from stereotypical media portrayals of the beatnik:

Much of Beat culture represented a negative stance rather than a positive one. It was animated more by a vague feeling of cultural and emotional displacement, dissatisfaction, and yearning, than by a specific purpose or program ... It was many different, conflicting, shifting states of mind.

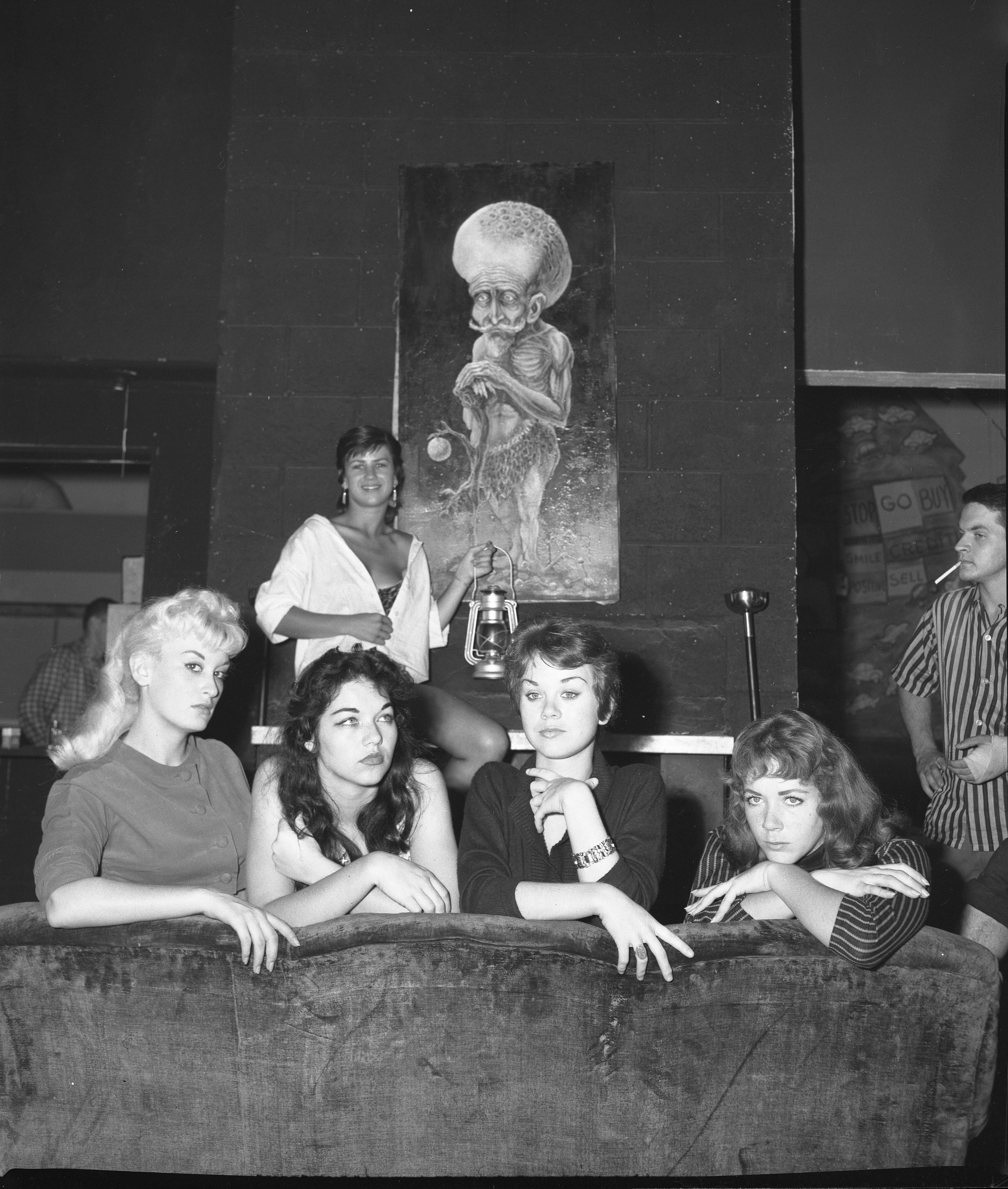
Posing before a sample of beatnik art are Miss Beatnik of 1959 contestants in Venice, California

Since 1958, the terms Beat Generation and Beat have been used to describe the antimaterialistic literary movement that began with Kerouac in the 1940s and continued into the 1960s. The Beat philosophy of antimaterialism and soul searching influenced 1960s musicians such as Bob Dylan, early Pink Floyd and The Beatles.

=== Music and fashion ===
However, the soundtrack of the beat movement was the modern jazz pioneered by saxophonist Charlie Parker and trumpeter Dizzy Gillespie, which the media dubbed bebop. Jack Kerouac and Allen Ginsberg spent much of their time in New York jazz clubs such as the Royal Roost, Minton's Playhouse, Birdland and the Open Door, "shooting the breeze" and "digging the music". Charlie Parker, Dizzy Gillespie and Miles Davis rapidly became what Ginsberg dubbed "secret heroes" to this group of aesthetes. The Beat authors borrowed much from the jazz/hipster slang of the 1940s, peppering their works with words such as "square", "cats", "cool" and "dig".

At the time the term "beatnik" was coined, a trend existed among young college students to adopt the stereotype. Men emulated the trademark look of bebop trumpeter Dizzy Gillespie by wearing goatees, horn-rimmed glasses and berets, rolling their own cigarettes, and playing bongos. Fashions for women included black leotards and long, straight, unadorned hair, in a rebellion against the middle-class culture of beauty salons. Marijuana use was associated with the subculture, and during the 1950s, Aldous Huxley's The Doors of Perception further influenced views on drugs.

By 1960, a small "beatnik" group in Newquay, Cornwall, England (including a young Wizz Jones) had attracted the attention and abhorrence of their neighbours for growing their hair beyond shoulder length, resulting in a television interview with Alan Whicker on BBC television's Tonight series.

=== Philosophy and religion ===
The Beat philosophy was generally countercultural and antimaterialistic, and stressed the importance of bettering one's inner self over material possessions. Some Beat writers, such as Gary Snyder, began to delve into Eastern religions such as Buddhism and Taoism. Politics tended to be liberal, left-wing and anti-war, with support for causes such as desegregation (although many of the figures associated with the original Beat movement, particularly Kerouac, embraced libertarian and conservative ideas). An openness to African American culture and arts was apparent in literature and music, notably jazz. While Caen and other writers implied a connection with communism, no obvious or direct connection occurred between Beat philosophy, as expressed by the literary movement's leading authors, and that of the communist movement, other than the antipathy both philosophies shared towards capitalism. Those with only a superficial familiarity with the Beat movement often saw this similarity and assumed the two movements had more in common.

The Beat movement introduced Asian religions to Western society. These religions provided the Beat generation with new views of the world and corresponded with its desire to rebel against conservative middle-class values of the 1950s, old post-1930s radicalism, mainstream culture, and institutional religions in America.

By 1958, many Beat writers published writings on Buddhism. This was the year Jack Kerouac published his novel The Dharma Bums, whose central character (whom Kerouac based on himself) sought Buddhist contexts for events in his life.

Allen Ginsberg's spiritual journey to India in 1963 also influenced the Beat movement. After studying religious texts alongside monks, Ginsberg deduced that what linked the function of poetry to Asian religions was their mutual goal of achieving ultimate truth. His discovery of Hindu mantra chants, a form of oral delivery, subsequently influenced Beat poetry. Beat pioneers who followed a Buddhism-influenced spiritual path felt that Asian religions offered a profound understanding of human nature and insights into the being, existence and reality of mankind. Many of the Beat advocates believed that the core concepts of Asian religious philosophies had the means of elevating American society's consciousness, and these concepts informed their main ideologies.

Notable Beat writers such as Kerouac, Ginsberg, and Gary Snyder were drawn to Buddhism to the extent that they each, at different periods in their lives, followed a spiritual path in their quests to provide answers to universal questions and concepts. As a result, the Beat philosophy stressed the bettering of the inner self and the rejection of materialism, and postulated that East Asian religions could fill a religious and spiritual void in the lives of many Americans.

Many scholars speculate that Beat writers wrote about Eastern religions to encourage young people to practice spiritual and sociopolitical action. Progressive concepts from these religions, particularly those regarding personal freedom, influenced youth culture to challenge capitalist domination, break their generation's dogmas, and reject traditional gender and racial rules.

=== Art ===
"Beatnik art" is the direction of contemporary art that originated in the United States as part of the beat movement in the 1960s. The movement itself, unlike the so-called "Lost Generation" did not set itself the task of changing society, but tried to distance itself from it. At the same time, the movement tried to create its own counter-culture. The art created by artists was influenced by jazz, drugs, occultism, and other attributes of beat movement.

The scope of the activity was concentrated in the cultural circles of New York City, Los Angeles, San Francisco and North Carolina. Prominent representatives of the trend were artists Wallace Berman, Jay DeFeo, Jess Collins, Robert Frank, Claes Oldenburg and Larry Rivers.

The culture of the beat generation has become a kind of intersection for representatives of the creative intellect of the United States associated with visual and performing art, which are usually attributed to other areas and trends of artistic expression, such as assemblage, happening, funk art and Neo-Dadaism. They made efforts to destroy the wall between art and real life, so that art would become a living experience in cafes or jazz clubs, and not remain the prerogative of galleries and museums. Many works of artists of the movement were created on the verge of various types of art.

Artists wrote poetry and poets painted, something like this can describe the processes taking place within the framework of the movement. Performances were a key element in the art of beats, whether it was the Theatrical Event of 1952 at Black Mountain College or Jack Kerouac typing in 1951 the novel On the Road on a typewriter in a single session on a single roll of 31-meter long paper.

Representatives of the movement were united by hostility to traditional culture with its conformism and brightly degenerate commercial component. They also did not like the approach of traditional culture to hushing up the dark side of American life – violence, corruption, social inequality, racism. They tried through art to create a new way of life based on the ideals of rebellion and freedom.

Critics highlight the artist Wallace Berman as the main representative of the movement. In his work concentrated many of the characteristic features of hipsters, especially in his collages made on photocopied photographs, which are a mixture of elements of pop art and mysticism. Among other artists and works, one can single out the work The Rose by the artist Jay DeFeo, the work on which was carried out for seven years, a huge painting-assembly weighing about a ton with a width of up to 20 centimeters.

== Beatniks in media ==
Poster for The Beatniks (1960)

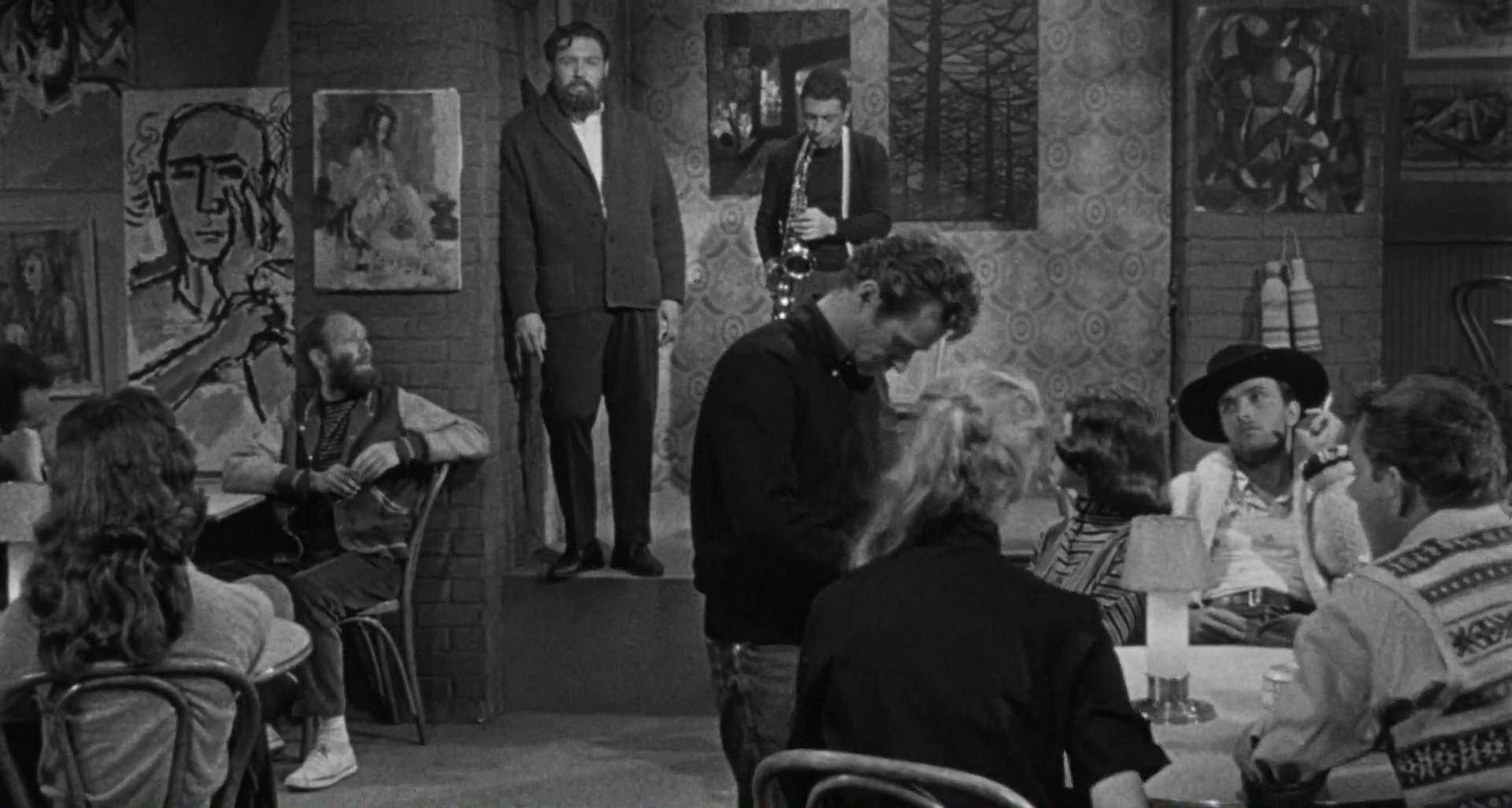
A scene from Roger Corman's A Bucket of Blood (1959) in which a character recites poetry in a beatnik coffeehouse.

Jules Feiffer's ad art for the Beat musical The Nervous Set was used on the 1959 cast album (reissued in 2002).

- Possibly the first film portrayal of the Beat society was in the 1950 noir film D.O.A, directed by Rudolph Maté. In the film the main character goes to a loud San Francisco bar, where one woman shouts to the musicians: "Cool! Cool! Really cool!" One of the characters says, "Man, am I really hip", and another replies, "You're from nowhere, nowhere!" Lone dancers are seen moving to the beat. Some are dressed with accessories and have hairstyles that one would expect to see in much later films. Typical 1940s attire is mixed with beatnik clothing styles, particularly in one male who has a beatnik hat, long hair, and a mustache and goatee, but is still wearing a dress suit. The bartender refers to a patron as "Jive Crazy" and talks of the music driving its followers crazy. He then tells one man to "Calm down, Jack!" and the man replies, "Oh don't bother me, man. I'm being enlightened!". The scene also demonstrates the connection to and influence of 1940s genres of African American music such as bebop on the emergence of Beat culture. The featured band "Jive" is all-black, while the customers who express their appreciation for the music in a jargon that would come to characterize the stereotype of Beat culture are young white hipsters.
- The 1953 Dalton Trumbo film Roman Holiday starring Audrey Hepburn and Gregory Peck features a supporting character played by Eddie Albert who is a stereotypical beatnik, appearing five years before the term was coined. He has an Eastern European surname, Radovich, and is a promiscuous photographer who wears baggy clothes, a striped T-shirt and a beard, which is mentioned four times in the screenplay.
- The character Maynard G. Krebs, played on TV by Bob Denver in The Many Loves of Dobie Gillis (1959–63), solidified the stereotype of the indolent non-conformist beatnik, which contrasted with the aggressively rebellious Beat-related images presented by popular film actors of the early and mid-1950s, notably Marlon Brando and James Dean.
- The Beat Generation (1959) associated the movement with crime and violence, as did The Bloody Brood (1959) and The Beatniks (1960).
- In The Apartment (1960), a character accuses protagonist CC Baxter of being a Beatnik for owning disposable paper towels rather than cloth napkins.
- An episode of The Addams Family titled "The Addams Family Meets a Beatnik," broadcast January 1, 1965, features a young biker/beatnik who injures himself in an accident, and ends up staying with the Addams family.
- Harry Connick Jr. portrays Dean, a beatnik, in Brad Bird's film The Iron Giant (1999).
- In Season 5, Episode 16 of the American sitcom, Laverne & Shirley, Shirley Feeney becomes enamored with the lifestyle after visiting a Beatnik coffeehouse with her friend and roommate, Laverne DeFazio. Laverne, not being too pleased with the scene, becomes distraught as Shirley takes on this new Beat persona by dressing in all black, performing exotic dances, and hanging up multiple posters of renowned poet, Allen Ginsberg.
- The Paramount Television Studios original School Spirits (2023 TV series) features a beatnik teenager, Rhonda Rosen, who appears as a ghost after being murdered by her guidance councillor in the 1960s.

== Beatnik books ==
Alan Bisbort's survey Beatniks: A Guide to an American Subculture was published by Greenwood Press in 2009 as part of the series Greenwood Press Guides to Subcultures and Countercultures. The book includes a timeline, a glossary and biographical sketches. Others in the Greenwood series: Punks, Hippies, Goths and Flappers.

Tales of Beatnik Glory: Volumes I and II by Ed Sanders is, as its name suggests, a collection of short stories, and a definitive introduction to the beatnik scene as lived by its participants. The author, who went on to found The Fugs, lived in the beatnik epicenter of Greenwich Village and the Lower East Side in the late 1950s and early 1960s.

Among the humor books, Beat, Beat, Beat was a 1959 Signet paperback of cartoons by Phi Beta Kappa Princeton graduate William F. Brown, who looked down on the movement from his position in the TV department of the Batten, Barton, Durstine & Osborn advertising agency.

Suzuki Beane (1961), by Sandra Scoppettone with Louise Fitzhugh illustrations, was a Bleecker Street beatnik spoof of Kay Thompson's Eloise series (1956–1959).

In the 1960s comic book, the Justice League of America's sidekick Snapper Carr was portrayed as a stereotypical beatnik, down to his lingo and clothes. The DC Comics character Jonny Double is portrayed as a beatnik.

== Museums ==
In San Francisco, Jerry and Estelle Cimino operate their Beat Museum, which began in 2003 in Monterey, California and moved to San Francisco in 2006. The building the museum currently occupies was formerly the Swiss American Hotel, and is the building where Lenny Bruce fell from a window and broke both his legs.

Ed "Big Daddy" Roth used fiberglass to build his Beatnik Bandit in 1960. Today, this car is in the National Automobile Museum in Reno, Nevada.

== See also ==
- Beat Generation
- Beatitude
- Cool
- Generation Gap
- Hippie
- Moody Street Irregulars
- Silent Generation
- Subcultures of the 1950s
- Yves Saint Laurent (designer)

== Sources ==
- Charters, Ann (ed.). The Portable Beat Reader. Penguin Books. New York. 1992. ISBN 0-670-83885-3 (hc); ISBN 0-14-015102-8 (pbk)
- Nash, Catherine. "The Beat Generation and American Culture." (PDF file)
- Phillips, Lisa (ed). Beat Culture and the New America: 1950–1965. New York: Whitney Museum of Art and Paris: Flammarion, 1995.
