= Visions of Cody =

1972 novel by Jack Kerouac

- First complete edition
- Author: Jack Kerouac
- Language: English
- Publisher: McGraw-Hill
- Publication date: 1972
- Publication place: United States
- Media type: Print (hardback & paperback)
- Pages: 448 pp
- ISBN: 0-14-017907-0
- OCLC: 27642070
- Dewey Decimal: 813.54 B 20
- LC Class: PS3521.E735 V5 1993
- Preceded by: Tristessa (1960)
- Followed by: Lonesome Traveler (1960)

Visions of Cody is an experimental novel by Jack Kerouac. It was written in 1951–1952, and though not published in its entirety until 1972, it had by then achieved an underground reputation. Since its first printing, Visions of Cody has been published with an introduction by Beat poet Allen Ginsberg titled "The Visions of the Great Rememberer."

== Origins ==
Visions of Cody is derived from experimental spontaneous prose inserts that Kerouac added to the original manuscript of On the Road in 1951–52. Part of the novel is a fast-forward recapitulation of the events described in On the Road, which was also about Kerouac and Neal Cassady. When Kerouac appeared on The Steve Allen Show in 1959, he secretly read from the introduction to the then-unpublished Visions of Cody although he was supposedly reading from On The Road, the book he was holding.

Excerpts from the novel were published by New Directions in 1959 as a 120 page, signed limited-edition of 750 copies, the entire novel being 'considered unpublishable' at the time.

== Book structure ==
The first section of the book is essentially a collection of short stream-of-consciousness essays, which Kerouac called "sketches", many simply describing elements of Duluoz's (Kerouac's) post-World War II New York City environment, from the texture and smells of a lunch counter to St. Patrick's Cathedral, or minor events like the decision to masturbate in a public restroom—all interlaced with Kerouac's internal dialogue. Along the way through these descriptions, Duluoz meanders towards a decision to go visit Cody in San Francisco.

The second section consists mainly of the transcription of taped conversations between Kerouac and Cassady (and occasionally "Evelyn"—Cassady's last wife, Carolyn and various friends) that extended over five nights as they drank and smoked marijuana. This is followed by a brief section entitled "Imitation of the Tape," a writing experiment by Kerouac in which he attempted to work from the spontaneity and speech patterns of the tape. The remainder of the book contains Kerouac's recounting of his travels with Cassady and the effect they had on their spiraling relationship.

== Character key ==
Kerouac often based his fictional characters on friends and family.

"Because of the objections of my early publishers I was not allowed to use the same personae names in each work."

Real-life person	Character name
Jack Kerouac	Jack Duluoz
Justin W. Brierly	Justin G. Mannerly
William S. Burroughs	Bull Hubbard
Bill Cannastra	Finistra
Lucien Carr	Julien Love
Carolyn Cassady	Evelyn
Neal Cassady	Cody Pomeray
Hal Chase	Val Hayes
Duke Chungas	Duke Gringas
Henri Cru	Deni Bleu
Bill Garver	Harper
Allen Ginsberg	Irwin Garden
Diane Hansen	Diane
Luanne Henderson	Joanna Dawson
Al Hinkle	Slim Buckle
Helen Hinkle	Helen Buckle
Jim Holmes	Tom Watson
John Clellon Holmes	Tom Wilson
Herbert Huncke	Huck
Frank Jeffries	Dave Sherman
David Kammerer	Dave Stroheim
Jerry Newman	Danny Richman
Edie Parker	Elly
Allan Temko	Allen Minko
Bill Tomson	Earl Johnson
Ed Uhl	Ed Wehle
Joan Vollmer	June

== Themes and literary style ==
The novel is heavily focused on his perception of and relationship to Neal Cassady, renamed "Cody Pomeray." According to Kerouac, the book represented a vertical metaphysical study of Cassady as a character and its relationship to the general America. Continuing to experiment with the spontaneous prose method he had outlined in 1950, he aimed to find "the wild form that can grow with my wild heart". The tape recorder transcriptions injects the presence of speech into the text. The style has been described as New Journalism fifteen years early. There are several meta passages in the book in which Kerouac in the words of Allen Ginsberg "writes about writing", at one point in French. Donald Allen states that the book seems self-consciously unfinished in order to convey 'an undisturbed flow from the mind of personal secret idea words'.
