= Bill Cannastra =

American writer

William Cannastra (November 6, 1921 – October 12, 1950) was a member of the early Beat Generation scene in New York. He was a "wild man" figure that the writers in the group found interesting, similar to their fascination with Neal Cassady. Characters based on Bill Cannastra were included in both the John Clellon Holmes novel Go (as "Agatson") and Jack Kerouac's Visions of Cody (as "Finistra"). He is also described in Allen Ginsberg's "Howl".

== Life ==
William Cannastra was one of two sons born to an aristocratic mother and a machinist father who had emigrated from Italy. "The Cannastras lived at 525 Pennsylvania Avenue in Schenectady, a tree-lined street in the shadows of the Mount Pleasant ballfields. Young Bill, who had the yearnings of a career in the art world, instead placated his parents by studying at Harvard Law School. In the summer of 1949, when he moved to New York City to further pursue his studies, [Joan] Haverty went with him."

Cannastra and Haverty met at an artists' colony in Provincetown, Massachusetts, when she was 19 years old. He was "vacationing as a scallop-boat fisherman", according to Haverty's memoir "Nobody's Wife" and biographical sketch in Women of the Beat Generation. It goes on to say, "She followed Bill to Manhattan at the end of the summer of 1949, and there she hung on to a precarious but happy existence, reveling in her seamstress job, window-peeping at night with Bill on the streets of New York ..."

According to Ellis Amburn: "Joan sometimes dressed in drag as a sailor and joined Cannastra in kinky games, peeping through windows."

The address of Cannastra's loft in Chelsea (long since torn down, now a modern condominium building) was 151 West 21st Street.

== Death ==
Cannastra died on October 12, 1950, in a drunken stunt, wherein he was trying to climb out of a subway car window just as it was pulling away from the platform and was decapitated. He was 28 years old.

Allen Ginsberg refers to the subway stop where Cannastra died as Astor Place. Some other accounts, including one from the day it happened, have it as the Bleecker Street stop.

Cannastra was living with Haverty at the time of his death. Shortly afterwards she met Jack Kerouac, who immediately proposed to her. It was in the loft where Cannastra had lived that Kerouac found sheets of tracing paper which he then used to write On the Road in April 1951.

== Cannastra in literature ==
=== John Clellon Holmes, Go ===
In Holmes' Go, Cannastra (alias Agatson) makes his entrance to a party:

... Agatson, in the tattered, shrunken pair of blue jeans and turtle neck sweater, looking as unshaven and fierce as a thirsty Portuguese fisherman, shouted: 'Is everyone drunk around here? Who are all these people? Who lives in this joint? ... Ketcham, what are you doing here of all places? Bianca was asking about you just last night, yes, yes! I told her to shut up and stop being sincere!... Is anyone real drunk?... I just walked up the street on the car-tops and hit only one convertible!'

Holmes discusses Cannastra in an interview in 1974:

I knew him pretty well. One reason that I put him into Go was that he seemed a contrast to Neal, Jack and the rest of us. He was an alcoholic; his motivation was embitteredness, the world's approaching end. His way of playing was self-destructive, it was giving wild parties that went on for days, and which were not chic at all but raunchy — we all dug ugliness then, that is, the worse it was, the more interesting it seemed to be. Cannastra would do anything: humiliate people, usually himself first, you know, take off all his clothes and fart, scream and yell. He seemed to be somebody playing on the edge ...

He was a graduate of Harvard Law School who had abandoned his practice. At that point he was a bisexual drunk who lived in a loft in Chelsea, and did everyday jobs like working in a bakery. He couldn't have been more than thirty when he died. He was an outrageous man, and I liked him because he was outrageous. He used to go into bars in Chelsea or near the docks and give longshoremen big wet tongue kisses, and say, 'Buy me a drink,' and they would beat him up, but then buy him drinks because he wasn't a 'pansy,' only premature-Camp.

Clellon's account of Bill Cannastra's death:

... he was on a subway, a local train, somewhere downtown, and as the train pulled out of the stop — the windows were open because it was warm — he tried to get out through the open window, was about halfway out as the train gathered speed and struck a pillar. He was very athletic: he climbed up fire escapes, and dangled over the sides of buildings, and so forth, but he was drunk. The girl he was with claimed that he said, 'I'm going to go get a drink.'

=== Allen Ginsberg's Howl ===
A number of lines in the poem "Howl" refer to Bill Cannastra:

who sang out of their windows in despair, fell out of the subway window, jumped in the filthy Passaic,
leaped on negroes, cried all over the street, danced on broken wineglasses barefoot smashed
phonograph records of nostalgic European 1930s German jazz finished the whisky and threw up
groaning into the bloody toilet, moans in their ears and the blast of colossal steamwhistles,

Ginsberg explains the music reference:

Nostalgic ... German jazz: Rise and Fall of the City of Mahagonny Brecht-Weill opera arias 'O Show Me the Way to the Next Whiskey Bar' and 'Benares Song', which echoed loud late nights repeatedly in Cannastra's West 21st Street Manhattan loft 1949.

=== Jack Kerouac's Visions of Cody ===
In Jack Kerouac's Visions of Cody, the character "Bill Finistra" is based on Cannastra; "Finistra" is a poet who is a friend of Jack Duluoz and travels with him from New York City to San Francisco in 1948 so they can visit a friend named "Cody Pomeroy" who is based on Neal Cassady. "Finistra" is an important supporting character throughout the novel.

=== In other literature ===
- Allen Ginsberg calls Cannastra the "prototype" of the Bill Genovese character in the Alan Harrington novel The Secret Swinger (1966).
- Another poem by Ginsberg, "The Names", discusses Cannastra under the name "Bill King".
- A third poem by Ginsberg is entitled "In Memoriam: William Cannastra, 1922-1950".
- Cannastra also appears as Finistra in Jack Kerouac's Book of Dreams (1961).
- Cannastra also appears as Bill Agatson in John Clellon Holmes' novel Get Home Free (1964).
- Alan Ansen's poem "Dead Drunk: In Memoriam William Cannastra, 1924-1950" appeared in Partisan Review, Vol XXVI, No 4, 1959. Reprinted in Contact Highs: Selected Poems 1957-1987 (1989) with the date amended to "1921-1950".
- In Alan Ansen's novel The Vigilantes (1987) the character Brendan Rcheznik was based on Cannastra.
- Robert Creeley's poem "N. Truro Light - 1946" is about Cannastra. It was published in his collection Mirrors (1984).
- Joan Haverty Kerouac's "Nobody's Wife" contains many chapters on Cannastra. (Creative Arts Book Company, 2000)
