= Beat Museum =

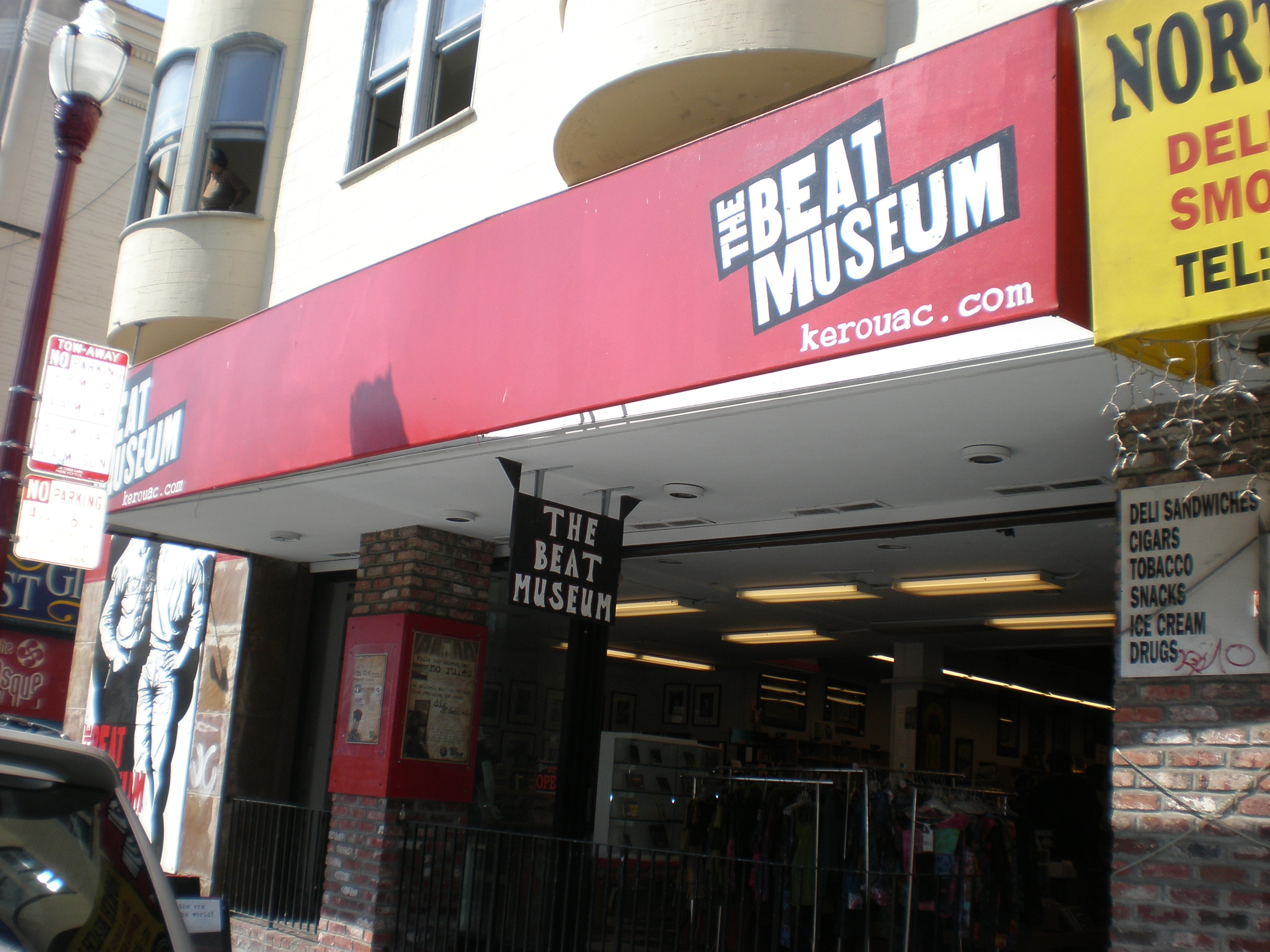

- Beat Museum Beat Museum (California) Beat Museum (the United States)
- Established: 2003
- Location: 540 Broadway; San Francisco, California
- Coordinates: 37.7981°N 122.4062°W
- Type: Literary museum
- Website: Official website

The Beat Museum is located in San Francisco, California and is dedicated to preserving the memory and works of the Beat Generation.

The Beat Generation was a group of post-WWII artists who challenged the social norms of the 1950s, encouraged experimentation with drugs and sexuality, practiced various types of Eastern religion, and desired to grow as humans. Also known as 'The Beats', they became famous in the 1950s and remain influential today. While dozens of personalities were involved in the formative years of the movement, the most celebrated members were Jack Kerouac, Allen Ginsberg, William S. Burroughs, and Neal Cassady.

Some musicians are also considered to be part of the Beat Generation's legacy including The Doors, Bob Dylan, The Beatles, and Tom Waits. Thomas Pynchon and Tom Robbins are examples of authors influenced by the Beat generation.

The Beat Museum is dedicated to spreading the values of the Beat Generation, “Compassion, Tolerance, and of Living One’s Own Individual Truth.”. Its collection holds thousands of pieces of memorabilia from the era, hundreds of photographs of the Beats and their contemporaries, and an extensive book selection.

== History ==
The Beat Museum began in Monterey, California in 2003 because the founders, Jerry and Estelle Cimino, were living there at that time. Estelle had some surplus office space which included a separate entrance at her downtown location for her career counseling business called the Career Action Center. Jerry had recently left corporate America and was ready to try something new, so he placed his personal collection of Beat memorabilia on display in downtown Monterey.

=== The Beat Museum on Wheels ===
Wanting to share the Beat Museum with the rest of America, Cimino and John Allen Cassady, son of Neal Cassady (Dean Moriarty in On the Road) and Carolyn Cassady, founded the Beat Museum on Wheels. Traveling from California to Maine to Florida and back again in an Airstream 345 motorhome in the fall of 2004 and 2005, Cimino and Cassady spoke at universities, high schools, and community centers. Stops included Penn State, Wayne State University in Detroit, SUNY Geneseo, Cal Poly in San Luis Obispo, University of Maryland, Baltimore County as well as performances at community centers such as the Henry Miller Memorial Library in Big Sur, the Fitton Center for Creative Arts in Hamilton, Ohio, KerouacFest in Windber, Pennsylvania, ArtSplash in Rockaway, New York and Lowell Celebrates Kerouac in Lowell, Massachusetts.

=== The Beat Museum relocates to San Francisco ===
Coming off the success of The Beat Museum on Wheels two year roadshow, The Beat Museum moved from Monterey, California to San Francisco's North Beach District in 2006. Initially, the museum secured a space for three months at the Live Worms Gallery on Grant Avenue. Later, it moved to a much larger location at 540 Broadway (at the intersection of Columbus Avenue and Broadway Street) directly across the street from City Lights Bookstore, at the epicenter of the 1950s San Francisco Beat hangout spots.

The building the museum currently occupies was formerly the Swiss American Hotel where many people lived off and on: Hube the Cube, Bob Kaufman, and others. It is also the building where Lenny Bruce fell from a window, broke his arm, and suffered back injuries.

Carolyn Cassady was the guest of honor for the opening weekend at the Beat Museum in North Beach and both the Associated Press and Reuters ran articles that ran in hundreds of newspapers around the world. Special guests at the opening included Michael McClure, Wavy Gravy, Al Hinkle, Magda Cregg, John Allen Cassady, Anne Marie Maxwell and Stanley Mouse.

== Exhibitions and acquisitions ==
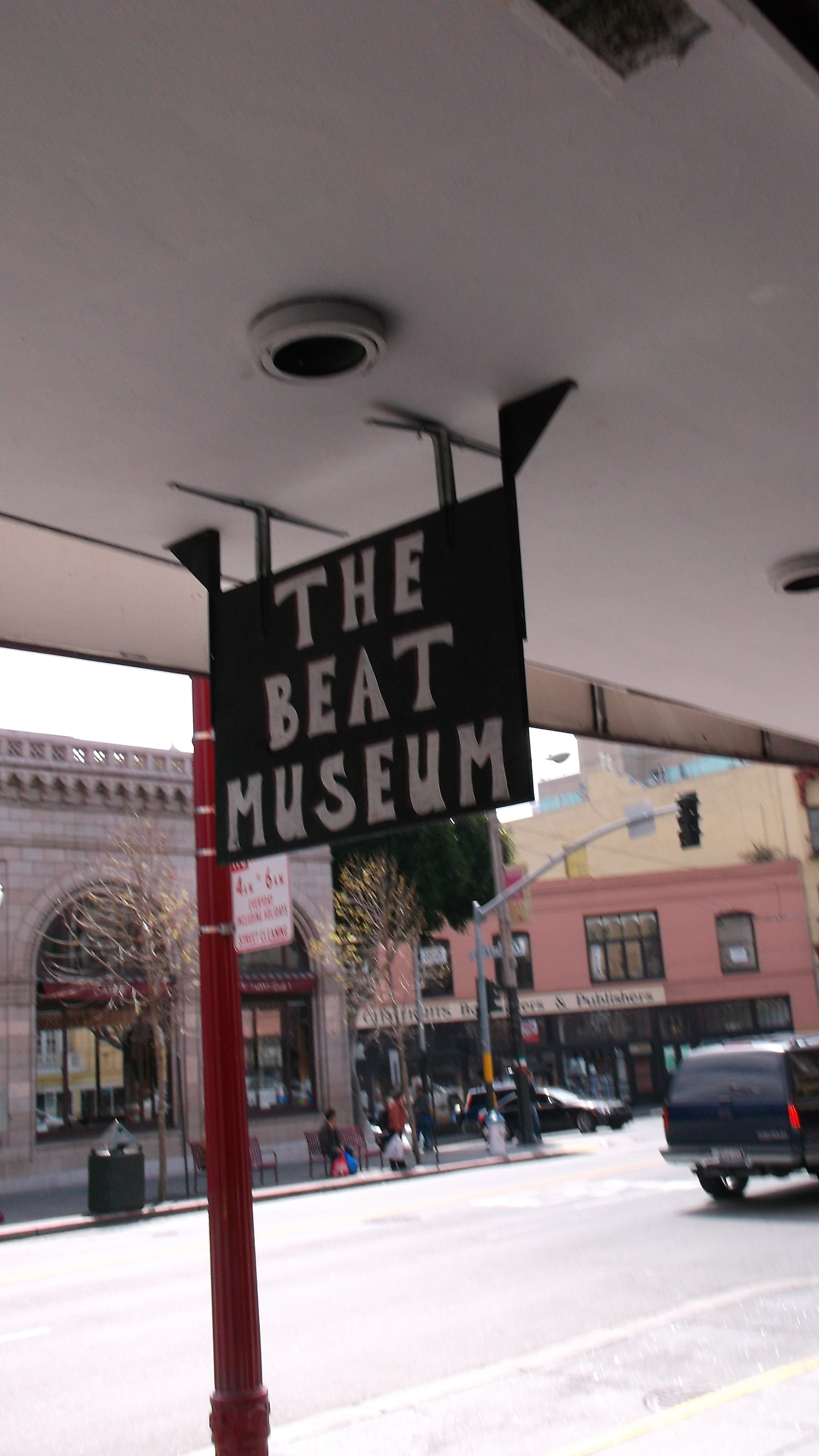
City Lights Bookstore (pink building) as seen from the Beat Museum

The museum has both permanent exhibitions and rotating exhibitions.

Much of the Beat Museum's acquisitions are items donated by family members, friends, and fans of the Beat generation. Recently donated pieces include the archives of publishers Arthur and Kit Knight; memorabilia from Kerouac's funeral; and Allen Ginsberg's typewriter. The referee shirt worn by Neal Cassady in Ken Kesey’s The Electric Kool-Aid Acid Test is on permanent display in the museum, as is Jack Kerouac’s tweed jacket, an original acid test card, and many other novelties from the Beat era.

Walter Salles, director of 2012’s film adaptation of On the Road, donated the 1949 Hudson car to the Beat Museum. Per Salles’s request, the car is not to be cleaned: the dirt and grime of the famous cross-country road trip are to remain as part of the car.

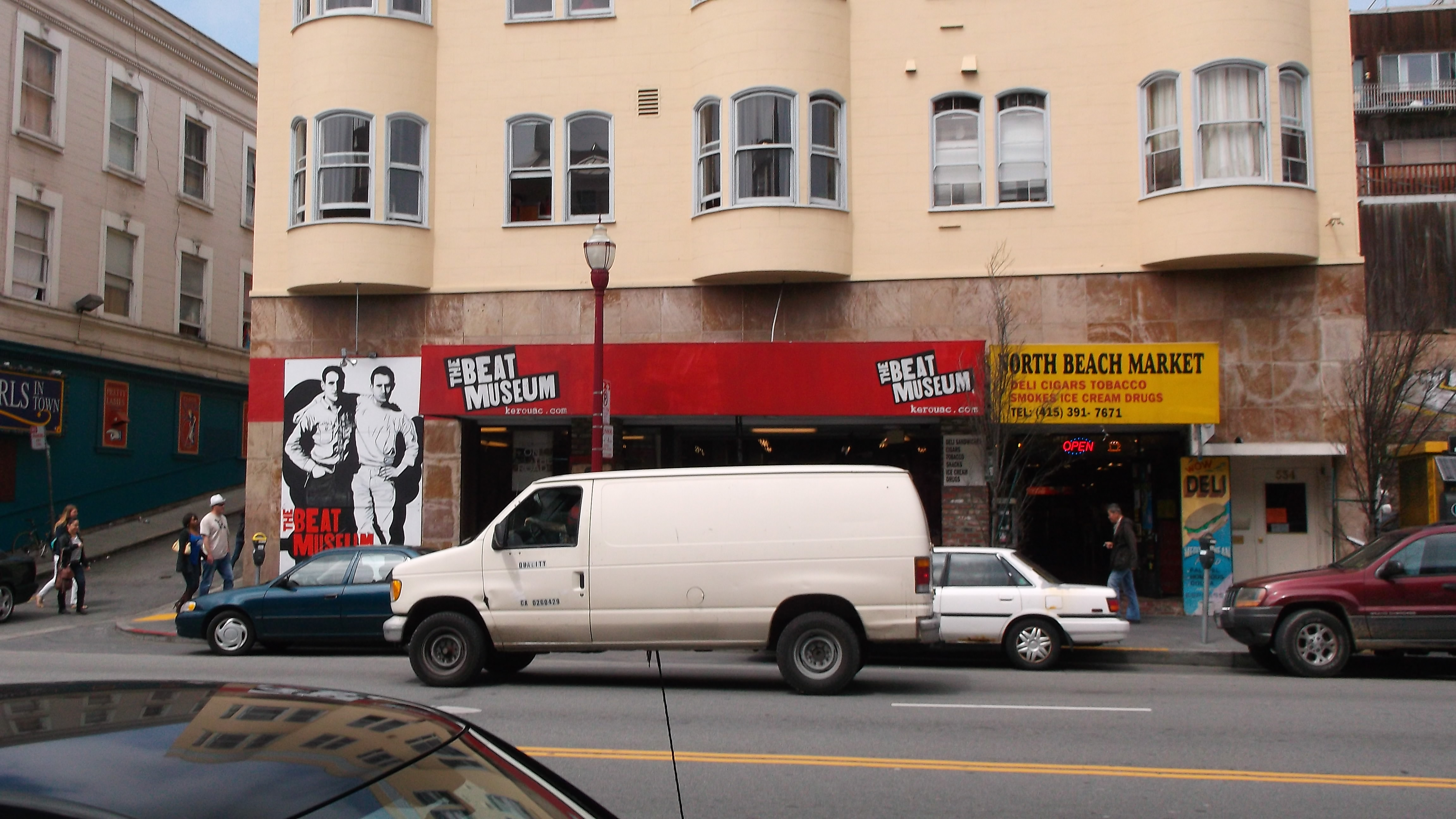
The Beat Museum as seen across Broadway

Permanent exhibits include details and memorabilia from the 1957 Howl obscenity trial, original art by Lawrence Ferlinghetti, Harold Norse, and Gregory Corso, a first edition copy of Kerouac’s first novel, The Town and the City, an advance copy from his hometown library, 'Women of the Beat Generation', which showcases the oft-forgotten Beat women, a room to display a continuously playing documentary, an exhibit called Passing the Torch: How the Beats Became the Hippies, and more. As of 2021 an iteration of the Brion Gysin Dreamachine, along with original manuscripts, first editions, and letters, rounds out the permanent collection.

Past visiting exhibitions include: Harold Chapman photography of the Beat Hotel; Jim Hatchett photography of Lew Welch, Philip Whalen, and Michael McClure, and Brother Antoninus a.k.a. William Everson.

== Celebrity supporters ==
Celebrity visitors to the Beat Museum include musicians Van Morrison, Patti Smith and Led Zeppelin’s Jimmy Page. Former governor and professional wrestler Jesse Ventura, actors Owen Wilson, Garrett Hedlund, Kristen Stewart, Michael Ornstein (Sons of Anarchy), Michael Imperioli (Sopranos), film maker John Waters and comedian and magician Penn Jillette, and singer Tom Waits. Waits’s song “California, Here I Come” is inspired by On the Road.

The Beat Museum is highlighted in Jillette’s book Every Day is an Atheist Holiday!: More Magical Tales from the Author of God, No!, “For a Beat fan, beatnik, peacenik, old hippie capitalist guy like me, this is the only museum that matters. Who needs old dinosaur bones?”. Jillette also poses semi-nude in a photograph in the book in homage to a similar photograph by Allen Ginsberg and Gregory Corso that hangs in the museum. As a comedian and entertainer, Jillette says he can relate to a story about Allen Ginsberg being heckled at a poetry reading and then shedding his clothes, “The poet stands naked before the world. Are you willing to stand naked before the world?”.

== Public programs ==
The Beat Museum holds regular readings and book signings and takes part in literature events such as the Litquake.

== Sources ==
- Karp, Evan. “The museum that Jack Kerouac built.” Examiner. 7 August 2010.
- McManis, Sam. “Discoveries: Beat generation lives in San Francisco museum.” The Sacramento Bee, 16 June 2013.
- Nolte, Carl. “New Museum, public display pay homage to Beat Generation / Kerouac fan opens Grant Avenue digs – ‘On the Road’ scroll be shown at library.” SF Gate, 13 January 2006.http://www.sfgate.com/bayarea/article/SAN-FRANCISCO-New-museum-public-display-pay-2506622.php
- Russo, Tony. “Attention Cool Cats: Frisco’s Beat Museum Welcomes You.” The Air Space, 27 October 2012. http://theairspace.net/commentary/attention-cool-cats-friscos-beat-museum-welcomes-you/
- Mickleburgh, Rod. “Kerouac and Me and the Beat Museum.” Mickleblog, 10 October 2013. http://mickleblog.wordpress.com/tag/jerry-cimino/
- Petruccelli, Kathryn. “The Beats Go On: Jerry Cimino’s shrine to Kerouac, et al, keeps the flame of the 50s alive.” Monterey County Weekly, 27 November 2003. http://www.montereycountyweekly.com/news/local_news/article_8c147295-9ff8-53ea-a741-56f665cdac91.html
- Odegard, Dave. “Big Change, Big Sur: Is Jack Kerouac Actually Filmable?” Word & Film, 11 November 2013. http://www.wordandfilm.com/2013/11/big-change-big-sur-is-jack-kerouac-actually-filmable/
- Samay, Melanie. “The Making of The Beat Museum.” Contemporary Jewish Museum, no date given. http://cjmvoices.blogspot.com/2013/08/the-making-of-beat-museum.html
- Staff Writer, SF Examiner – Beat Museum Gets Permanent Digs on Broadway
