= Off the Road =

Autobiographical book by Carolyn Cassady

- Author: Carolyn Cassady
- Language: English
- Genre: Autobiography; Literary History
- Publisher: Black Spring Press
- Publication date: 1990
- Publication place: United Kingdom
- Media type: Print hardback
- Pages: 436 pp
- ISBN: 0-948238-05-4

Off the Road: Twenty Years with Cassady, Kerouac and Ginsberg is an autobiographical book by Carolyn Cassady. Originally published in 1990 as Off the Road: My Years with Cassady, Kerouac, and Ginsberg, it was republished by London's Black Spring Press, coinciding with the fiftieth anniversary of Jack Kerouac's On the Road. Off the Road recounts the history of Carolyn Cassady, wife of Jack Kerouac's traveling companion and On the Road's hero Neal Cassady. As Neal's wife and Kerouac's intermittent lover, Carolyn Cassady was well situated to record the inception of the Beat Generation and its influence on American culture.

Off the Road begins in the initial stages of Kerouac and Neal Cassady's friendship, when Kerouac was a struggling author trying to publish his first novel (1950's The Town and the City), and documents important moments in the beat movement such as the success of On the Road and Allen Ginsberg's "Howl."

== Publication history ==
- 1990, UK, Black Spring Press, 436 pp, hardcover, ISBN 0-948238-05-4
- 1990, USA, William Morrow, 436 pp, hardcover, ISBN 0-688-08891-0
- 1991, UK, Penguin. 1 August 1991, 464 pp, paperback, ISBN 978-0-14-015390-3
- 2007, UK, Black Spring Press, 12 July 2007, 448 pp, paperback, ISBN 978-0-948238-37-6

== See also ==
- Love Always, Carolyn, 2011 documentary film on Carolyn, covering similar subject material.
