= Baby Driver (disambiguation) =

Baby Driver is a 2017 action-crime film.

Baby Driver may also refer to:

- Baby Driver – Music from the Motion Picture, the soundtrack album to the film Baby Driver
- Baby Driver, a 1981 novel by Jan Kerouac
- "Baby Driver", a song by Simon and Garfunkel from Bridge over Troubled Water
- "Baby Driver", a song by Kiss from Rock and Roll Over
