= Joan Haverty Kerouac =

American author (1931–1990)

Joan Haverty Stuart Kerouac
- Born: Joan Virginia Haverty; 1931 near Albany, New York, U.S.
- Died: May 15, 1990 (aged 58–59); Eugene, Oregon, U.S.
- Other names: Joan Virginia Haverty Stuart, Joan Haverty Kerouac Stuart
- Occupation: Writer
- Spouses: Jack Kerouac (1950–1952, div.); John Aly
- Children: 4, including Jan Kerouac

Joan Haverty Kerouac (1931– May 15, 1990), born Joan Virginia Haverty, was the second wife of writer Jack Kerouac and the author of an autobiography, Nobody's Wife: The Smart Aleck and the King of the Beats. Joan Kerouac's autobiography, which existed only in manuscript form when she died, appeared in book form in 2000 after the Kerouacs' only child, Jan Kerouac, her half-brother, David, and David's brother-in-law John Bowers helped prepare it for publication.

== Life and career ==
Joan Haverty was born near Albany, New York, and grew up there. At age 19, she moved to Manhattan after befriending Bill Cannastra, a lawyer she met in Provincetown, Massachusetts, while visiting an artists' colony. She remained close to Cannastra until his death in a subway accident in 1950.

Later in 1950, Joan met Jack Kerouac in Manhattan. He invited her to his mother's home to meet his mother, Gabrielle Kerouac, and two weeks later Joan and Jack were married. Joan became the model for the character Laura in Jack Kerouac's novel On the Road. The marriage, during which Joan became pregnant with Jan, lasted only eight months, and the couple separated before Jan was born.

Jack for many years denied paternity. He went to court to avoid paying child support and did not meet his daughter until she was age 10. After separating from Jack, Joan lived at times in other parts of the U.S., including San Francisco, the state of Washington, and Eugene, Oregon. She remarried and eventually had three more children: David and twins Sharon and Kathy. In 1974, she changed her last name to Stuart. Joan Haverty Kerouac Stuart died on May 15, 1990, in Eugene, Oregon.

Reviewer David Adox said in The New York Times that Nobody's Wife "... shows the fragile and insecure side of [Jack] Kerouac, and interweaves details of Kerouac's life with the story of a young, smart and sensitive woman coming of age in the 1950s." A review in Publishers Weekly, says that the book "... is as much about Haverty's early grab at independence in 1950s New York and the other men in that period of her life as it is about her brief marriage to the Beat hero...". The reviewer concludes that "... Haverty's straightforward, infrequently lyric prose isn't under the spell of the Beats–which will probably count against her with Kerouac-worshipping Beat fans."

== Bibliography ==
=== Autobiography ===
- Nobody's Wife: The Smart Aleck and the King of the Beats (2000, published posthumously) OCLC 44883825

=== Magazine article ===
- "My Ex-Husband, Jack Kerouac, Is an Ingrate", Confidential, 1961
