= Allan Temko =

American academic

Allan B. Temko
- Born: Allan Bernard Temko; February 4, 1924; Brooklyn, New York
- Died: January 25, 2006 (aged 81); Orinda, California
- Education: Columbia University (BA); University of California, Berkeley
- Spouse: Becky (1950–1996, her death)
- Children: 2

Allan Bernard Temko (February 4, 1924 – January 25, 2006) was an American architectural critic and writer based in San Francisco. He won the Pulitzer Prize for Criticism in 1990.

== History ==
Born in New York City and raised in Weehawken, New Jersey, Temko served as a U.S. Navy officer in World War II, graduated from Columbia University in 1947, and continued his graduate studies at the University of California, Berkeley, and at the Sorbonne in Paris, France. He taught for several years in France and produced a landmark book about the Cathedral of Notre Dame, Notre Dame of Paris, in 1955. He wrote architectural criticism for the San Francisco Chronicle from 1961 to 1993. He also taught city planning and the social sciences at the University of California, Berkeley and California State University, Hayward (now California State University, East Bay).

Following Finnish-born architect Eero Saarinen's death in 1961, Temko published Eero Saarinen (1962), a critical examination of Saarinen's most famous works from the General Motors Technical Center to the Jefferson National Expansion Memorial and its Gateway Arch (still in the planning stages at the time), as a volume in George Braziller's Makers of Contemporary Architecture series.

Temko was an activist critic who defended the urban character and texture of San Francisco from, in his words, "a variety of villains: real estate sharks, the construction industry and its unions, venal politicians, bureaucrats, brutal highway engineers, the automobile lobby, and – in some ways worst of all – incompetent architects and invertebrate planners who were wrecking the Bay Area before our eyes." One of these villains, an architect named Sandy Walker, famously sued Temko over his 1978 description of Walker's Pier 39 project which began, "Corn. Kitsch. Schlock. Honky-tonk. Dreck. Schmaltz. Merde."

Temko was instrumental in the removal of the Embarcadero Freeway and memorably described the 1971 Vaillancourt Fountain on the Embarcadero as a thing "deposited by a concrete dog with square intestines."

He described the City Center Building in Hayward in the early 1970s, calling it a "toaster", due to its slightly elongated rectangular shape, which strongly influenced public opinion of the building.

Temko, who met Jack Kerouac when they were both undergraduates at Columbia, appears in Kerouac's novel On the Road as the model for the character "Roland Major". Temko also appeared in Kerouac's Book of Dreams as Irving Minko and in Visions of Cody as Allen Minko.

He called for an international design competition for the eastern span replacement of the San Francisco–Oakland Bay Bridge, saying that both the single-tower cable-stayed scheme (favored by T.Y. Lin) and the single-masted self-anchored suspension design ultimately chosen were incapable of being "a world-famous work of engineering art."

Temko was awarded the Pulitzer Prize for Criticism in 1990. He died of apparent congestive heart failure at the Orinda Convalescent Hospital in Orinda, California, in 2006.
