= Justin W. Brierly =

American educator and lawyer

- Born: September 3, 1905; Denver, Colo.
- Died: April 13, 1985 (aged 79); Denver, Colo.
- Occupations: Guidance counselor; Educator, secondary
- Board member of: Denver, Colorado Ivy League Scholarship Board, Central City [Colorado] Opera House Association, etc.

Academic background
- Education: Columbia University

Academic work
- Discipline: English literature
- Institutions: Denver Public Schools, East High School, Denver, Colorado
- Influenced: Norman Ralph Augustine, Neal Cassady, Haldon Chase, Jack Kerouac

Justin W. Brierly (September 3, 1905 – April 13, 1985) was an American educator and lawyer. Born to a Colorado pioneer family and educated at Columbia and the University of Denver Law School, he was noted in his work in secondary education for his efforts to place students into prominent universities, and as a patron of the performing arts in Colorado. He is also remembered for his association with Beat Generation icons Neal Cassady and Jack Kerouac.

== Early life and education ==
Justin W. Brierly was born on September 3, 1905, in Denver, Colorado, to a family whose history included the settling of Colorado as pioneers. Before attending Columbia College in New York City (now Columbia University), Brierly attended Manual High School (graduating 1929), and after, the University of Denver Law School.

== Career ==
After college at Columbia, Brierly helped form a talent agency in New York. He then returned to Denver, where he had a legal practice, and became a guidance counselor and teacher—the latter, beginning with English literature, at East High School. Brierly took an active role in mentoring young men he considered bright students, to help motivate them and use his connections to place them in college.

After fourteen years as a teacher, Brierly joined the Denver Public Schools administration, where he "established their program of college and scholarship guidance", and was appointed supervisor of that program. He also served as a committee member of the Ivy League Scholarship Board in Denver. Future aerospace CEO and Defense Department official Norman Ralph Augustine was among the students Brierly mentored.

During World War II, British Prime Minister Winston Churchill invited Brierly to England as a consultant on the evacuation of children from urban areas at risk from German bombing. Brierly retired from the school system in 1971, after thirty-six years of service.

== Role with Beat writers ==
Brierly is known for having been a friend of Jack Kerouac and Allen Ginsberg, and a mentor to Neal Cassady and Haldon Chase, and documents from these relationships constitute a significant part of the historical record about Brierly. In 1941, Brierly met Cassady, then a 15-year-old juvenile delinquent who would become a significant influence on the Beat writers and a countercultural icon in his own right. Impressed by Cassady's intelligence, Brierly took an active role in Cassady's life over the next few years, helping admit him to high school, encouraging and supervising his reading, and finding employment for him. Cassady continued his criminal activities, however, and was repeatedly arrested from 1942 to 1944; on at least one of these occasions, he was released by law enforcement into Brierly's safekeeping. He and Brierly actively exchanged letters during this period even through Cassady's intermittent incarcerations; these represent Cassady's earliest surviving letters. Brierly, apparently a closeted homosexual, is also believed to have been responsible for Cassady's first homosexual experience.

Cassady was introduced to future Beat Generation literary icons Jack Kerouac and Allen Ginsberg in 1946 by Brierly protégé, Haldon Chase, who Brierly had helped place at Columbia University. Kerouac in turn met Brierly in 1947 during a trip to see Cassady in Denver and established a friendship with him. In 1950, Brierly wrote an article for the Denver Post about Kerouac's first published novel, The Town and the City, and organized a book signing for him in Denver. Kerouac's second novel, On the Road (1957), loosely fictionalized his experiences in the late 1940s, with a focus on his friendship with Cassady. Brierly had a major role in early manuscripts, which provided important context for Cassady's depiction, but Kerouac also took the opportunity to satirize Brierly at length. Due in part to the publisher's fear of a libel suit from Brierly, considered one of the few "respectable" figures in the book, Kerouac substantially trimmed his depiction. Brierly appears in the final published novel only in brief passages, as the comical, minor character—named "Denver D. Doll." Kerouac's original portrayal of Brierly was finally published in 2007, in On the Road: The Original Scroll. Kerouac also included references to Brierly in Visions of Cody as "Justin G. Mannerly," and in Book of Dreams as "Manley Mannerly."

== Other activities ==
Brierly was a prominent supporter of the performing arts in Denver. He was involved with the Central City Opera House Association between 1937 and 1948. In 1937, He became "the first executive manager of the... Association and later served on [its] Board of Directors, Executive Board, and eventually [as] an honorary trustee. He served on many other public and private organizational boards, for instance, as a trustee of Colorado Outward Bound School, a board member of the American Council of Émigrés in the Professions, and as an adviser to the board of the Institute of International Education.

As a practicing attorney, Brierly served as an assistant to the president of Colorado Women's College following his retirement from the public schools. In 1972, Brierly founded the Martha Faure Carson Library at the Colorado Women's College, in honor of a friend who had been one of Denver's noted dance teachers; upon Brierly's death, it was renamed the Carson-Brierly Dance Library, now part of the Penrose Library at the University of Denver. The Colorado Historical Society was the recipient of his gift of the historic McFarlane House, in Central City, Colorado, in 1976.

== Personal life and legacy ==
Brierly died at age 79, in Denver on April 13, 1985. His obituary in the Rocky Mountain News called him "one of Denver's most distinguished educators."
