= Go (Holmes novel) =

1952 semi-autobiographical novel by John Clellon Holmes

- First edition
- Author: John Clellon Holmes
- Language: English
- Genre: Beat
- Publisher: Scribner's
- Publication date: 1952
- Publication place: United States
- Media type: Print (Hardback & Paperback)
- OCLC: 62760722

Go is a 1952 semi-autobiographical novel by John Clellon Holmes. (Holmes referred to the book as a roman à clef.) It is considered to be the first published novel depicting the Beat Generation. Set in New York, it concerns the lives of a collection of characters largely based on the friends Holmes used to hang around with in the 1940s and 1950s in Manhattan. An underworld of drug-fueled parties, bars, clubs and free love is explored through the eyes of character Paul Hobbes, Holmes' representation of himself in the novel. Hobbes is torn between joining his friends in their riotous existence and trying to maintain his relatively stable life and marriage to his wife Kathryn.

== Plot introduction ==
Go concerns protagonist Paul Hobbes' struggle to maintain his marriage to his wife, Kathryn, while simultaneously indulging in the world of the 1940s and 1950s Beat Generation. It follows the complications of interpersonal relationships arising from a group of disillusioned and often eccentric young people. Hobbes finds himself in a world of promiscuity, casual drug use and petty crime but retains a certain detachment from it, sometimes to the annoyance of his friends. From wild all night parties to Allen Ginsberg's visions of William Blake to the death of Bill Cannastra, the events of the book are largely real events, some of them alluded to in other Beat works, most notably Ginsberg's "Howl". Holmes has said that the only plot element entirely invented by himself is Kathryn's infidelity.

== Different titles ==
The original manuscript was named The Daybreak Boys as an allusion to a rivergang on the New York waterfront in the 1840s, but this title was rejected as a book with a similar title had been published by Scribner's shortly before Go was received. The word Go appears regularly in the book, spoken by many of the cast of characters, almost as a mantra. In Britain Go was originally published as The Beat Boys.

== Characters in Go ==
The characters in Go are, as was common in Beat Generation literature, representations of the real people the author knew while writing the book.

- Paul Hobbes is John Clellon Holmes
- Gene Pasternak is Jack Kerouac
- David Stofsky is Allen Ginsberg
- Hart Kennedy is Neal Cassady
- Will Dennison is William S. Burroughs
- Bill Agatson is Bill Cannastra
- Albert Ancke is Herbert Huncke
- Dinah is LuAnne Henderson
- Ed Schindel is Al Hinkle

== Release details ==
- Holmes JC. Charles Scribner’s Sons; 1952.
