= Haldon Chase =

American archaeologist (1923–2006)

- Born: 1923; Denver, Colorado
- Died: 2006
- Other name: Hal Chase
- Education: Columbia University
- Occupation: archaeologist
- Spouse: Virginia "Ginger" Bailey (1945 – 1951)

Haldon Chase (1923–2006) was an American archaeologist known for his research on several rock art sites in Colorado. Outside of archaeology, he was best known as part of the earliest Beat circle and inspiration for several characters in the novels of Jack Kerouac and William S. Burroughs.

== Early life ==
Chase was born around 1923 in Denver, Colorado, where he was brought up. In high school, by composing a fictional dialogue between Nietzsche and Dostoevsky, he attracted the attention of an official and a Columbia alumnus from Denver called Justin Brierly. Brierly, who had a reputation of selecting young male protégés and placing them to his own alma mater, recommended Chase to Columbia University.

Chase met Joan Vollmer in New York in the early 1940s, and became one of Vollmer's tenants in the apartments at 421 West 118th Street (1943 – 1944) and at 419 West 115th Street (1945 – 1946) in New York. The other people who shared or frequented Vollmer's apartments in the period would later be known as the Beat Generation figures, including Edie Parker, Lucien Carr, Allen Ginsberg (who shared a room with Chase), William Burroughs and Jack Kerouac.

In the apartment on 115th Street, Chase befriended Kerouac over their shared "passion for life", the latter of whom was intrigued by Chase's "outgoing ease and sexual prowess". Ginsberg also showed infatuation towards Chase, and was said to have "made some unsuccessful sexual overtures toward him", but Chase was unimpressed due to his own "unshakable heterosexuality". Chase joined the literary talks with the Beat circle as well: in the fall of 1945 there were seminal nightly discussions called "the Night of the Wolfeans", with Chase and Kerouac as the Thomas Wolfe-lovers in the group, and Burroughs and Ginsberg the "non-Wolfeans".

Back in Denver, Chase had been the friend and mentor of Neal Cassady, who was then another notable protégé of Brierly's. It was Chase who introduced Neal Cassady to the Beat circle in 1940s, although at first not yet in person: Chase had passed around his collection of Neal's letters from reform school; on the other end, Chase had also showed his correspondence with Ginsberg and Kerouac to Cassady as well. Sometime around the end of 1946 – the beginning of 1947, Neal with his then wife Lu Anne went to visit Chase in New York. Through Chase's introduction, Ginsberg met Cassady over a booth in the West End bar, and shortly after, Kerouac met Cassady in Chase and his friend Ed White's attic room in Columbia University’s Livingston Hall. Cassady would then soon become a prominent figure of the group, and the muse who inspired Kerouac's and Ginsberg's numerous works, including two of Kerouac's most famous novels, On the Road and Visions of Cody.

Chase moved out of the 115th Street apartment in 1946, drifting away from the scene, because he disapproved of the Beat circle's lifestyle. He was thereafter less often heard of by the Beat writers.

In 1949, upon hearing that Chase was back in Colorado for some archaeological field work, Kerouac called Chase in the hope of reunion. Although they had a long talk over the phone, Chase did not agree to see him, which was, according to Kerouac, possibly because Chase's wife disapproved. Kerouac wrote in his letter to Ginsberg, "Hal is really dead."

In 1951, Chase went to Mexico and briefly reunited with some of the Beats there, including William Burroughs, and Frank Jeffries, his childhood friend who also went to Columbia University. Chase and Burroughs encountered in a bar in Mexico City, where Burroughs asked Chase to spend the night with him but was rejected. In the same year, Chase also came upon Vollmer whom he found in a bad shape. After Burroughs shot Vollmer in the head, killing her, Chase distanced himself from Burroughs.

== Marriage with Ginger Bailey ==
Virginia Bailey (nicknamed "Ginger") was born in 1928 in New York City, the youngest of three children born to musician parents. Her father, named Charles Bailey, was a voice teacher, and her mother, Ida Mayhew, taught piano. In the early 1940s, she worked as a model for perfume advertisements, as well as a singer and guitarist in night clubs. Around this time, she met Kerouac and started a short-lived romantic relationship with him (Kerouac mentioned her as "Dark Eyes" in his journal). Around 1945, Bailey began to date Chase, whom she later married in 1949.

Bailey assisted Chase in most of his archaeological field projects. When Chase went to Mexico City to study the Zapotec languages, Bailey also went with him. However, their marriage was said to have been undermined by the disagreement that, while Bailey was interested in field work, Chase preferred her to keep house for him. Their marriage ended shortly after the catalyzing tragedy that was Vollmer's death. Bailey returned to New York before Chase did, and continued to perform as a singer and guitarist under the stage name of Ginny Mayhew (taken from her mother's maiden name).

== In archaeology ==
Enthusiastic about traditional Indian art, Chase had an interest in archaeology early in his teenage years, and had taken part in archaeological field research when in high school. He studied anthropology at Columbia University. He was influenced by anthropologists Julian Steward (his advisor), Alfred Kroeber, and Franz Boas.

On the High Plains Archaeological Expedition in 1949, Chase, along with Robert Stegler who also came from Columbia University, set up their field camp beside the Purgatoire River. They discovered several tipi rings, as well as rock art sites. Later that summer, Chase and Stegler excavated and recorded more rock art panels at the Snake Blakeslee site on the Apishapa River. Chase had also worked for the Peabody Museum at Harvard, the Denver Art Museum, and Louden-Henritze Archaeology Museum in Trinidad. In 1951, Chase took a teaching job at Trinidad State Junior College, and during that time contributed in setting up the archaeology programme there.

== Later years ==
In 1951, Chase, possibly granted by the Peabody Museum and the Taylor Museum of Colorado Springs, Colorado, went to Mexico City College to study the Zapotec languages, and stayed in Mexico until 1956, when he returned from Mexico to the US. Afterwards, he ceased to participate in the Beat movement, and also abandoned anthropological research. Instead, he lived in rural California for the next few decades, leading a life of building sailboats and Renaissance musical instruments (including lutes, viols, and vihuelas), as well as other activities including "subsistence farming, orchard-tending, and dairy production", according to fellow archaeologist Chris Lintz's account of him in 1999. A "friendly, but eccentric hermit," he was reported to have nine children and "two or three mongrel dogs".

Chase died in 2006.

== Appearance in fictional works ==
As a close friend of the core Beat members, Chase often appeared in their works under different names.

Most of Kerouac's works are romans à clef (novels that were largely based on real people and events). In these works, Chase was:

- Chad King in On the Road;
- Val Hayes and Val King in Visions of Cody;
- Val Hayes and Halnau in the original manuscript of Book of Dreams published in 2001;
- Halvar "Hal" Hayes in the 1961 edition of Book of Dreams.

Chase also appeared as Winston Moor in Queer by William Burroughs.
