= Nolan Miller (writer) =

American novelist

- Born: 1907; Kalida, Ohio
- Died: September 30, 2006 (aged 98–99); Yellow Springs, Ohio
- Occupations: novelist, editor, teacher

Nolan Miller (1907 – September 30, 2006) was a noted short story writer and novelist. Miller was the fiction editor of The Antioch Review and a long-time member of the Antioch College faculty.

== Fiction and faculty ==
Miller attended Wayne State University where he received both a BA and an MA. His favorite authors were Wordsworth, Proust, Joyce and D. H. Lawrence. While working as a Detroit, Michigan high school teacher, Miller wrote short stories. A story in The Atlantic Monthly prompted Atlantic editor Edward Weeks to recommend Miller as an Antioch College "writer in residence".

In 1946, he was invited to join the faculty at Antioch College, where he served as fiction editor for The Antioch Review and taught creative writing for more than half a century. Rod Serling wrote the first version of his award-winning script Requiem for a Heavyweight while a student in one of Miller's classes.

Beginning in 1955, Miller edited the New Campus Writing series, collecting the best of creative writing from America's colleges. He became the first fiction editor of The Antioch Review in 1965. He wrote four novels: Why I Am So Beat (Putnam, 1954). Sarah Belle Luella Mae, A Moth of Time and The Merry Innocents. His 1959 short story “A New Life” was included in the O. Henry Prize Awards. His stories also appeared in Collier's and The Saturday Evening Post.

== Awards ==
Miller was a recipient of the Hopwood Award from the University of Michigan.

After Miller retired in 1972, he remained active with The Antioch Review. He died in 2006 at the age of 99.
