= Jan Kerouac =

American novelist (1952–1996)

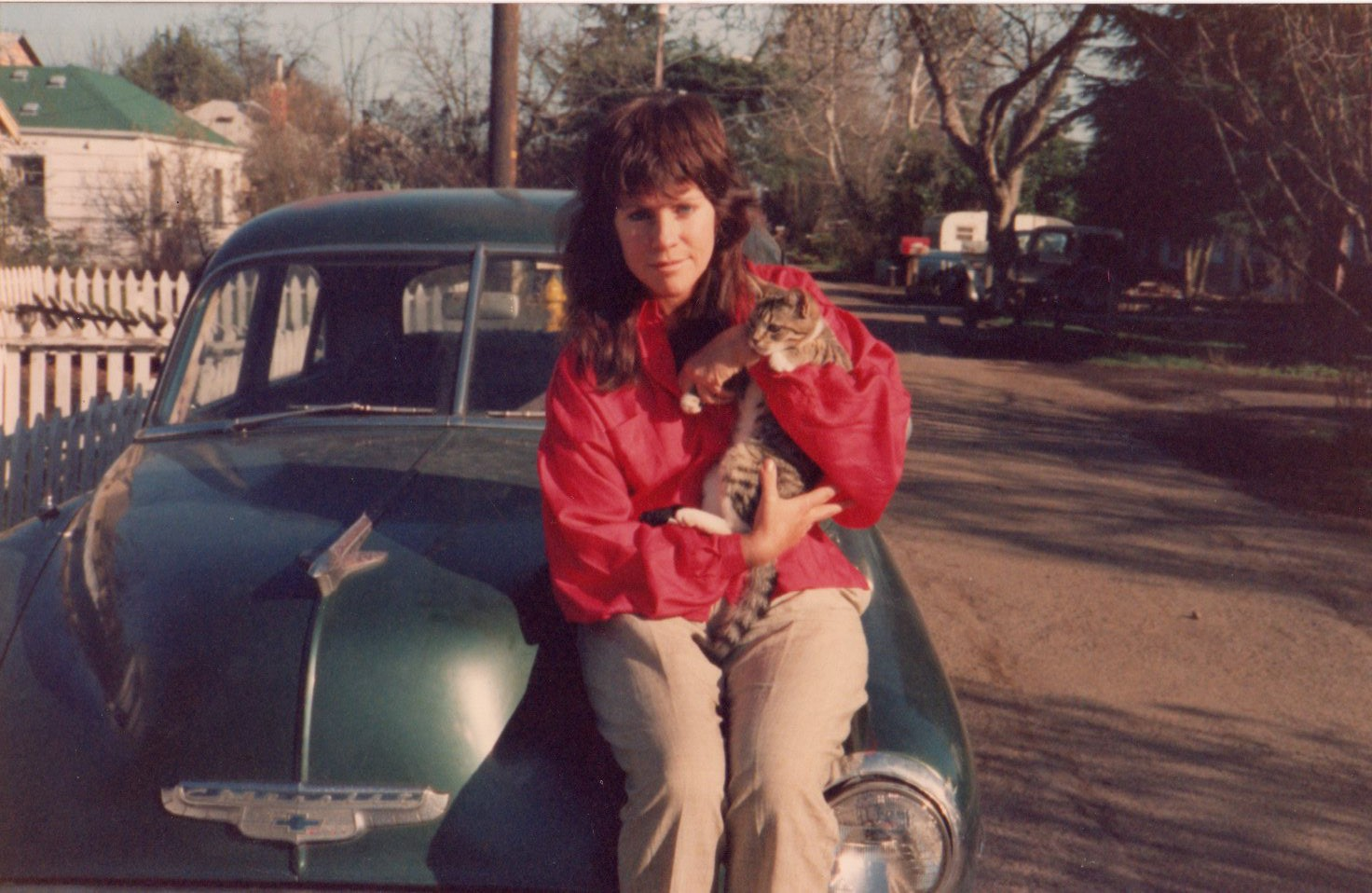
- Kerouac in 1983
- Born: Janet Michelle Kerouac; February 16, 1952; Albany, New York, U.S.
- Died: June 5, 1996 (aged 44); Albuquerque, New Mexico, U.S.
- Resting place: Saint Louis De Gonzague Cemetery, Nashua, New Hampshire, U.S.
- Occupation: Writer
- Relatives: Jack Kerouac (father); Joan Haverty Kerouac (mother)

Janet Michelle "Jan" Kerouac (February 16, 1952 – June 5, 1996) was an American writer and the only child of Beat Generation author Jack Kerouac and Joan Haverty Kerouac.

== Early life and career ==
Janet Michelle Kerouac was born a few months after her parents separated. Jack Kerouac denied paternity. He met his daughter for the first time when she was ten years old, when he took a blood test to prove or disprove his paternity. Jan only met him once more, when she visited him at his home in Lowell, Massachusetts.

In 1964, Jan Kerouac was briefly in a girl group called the Whippets. The group, which consisted of Kerouac, Charlotte Rosenthal, and Bibbe Hansen, released one single, "I Want to Talk to You", a song response to The Beatles' song "I Want to Hold Your Hand". The B-side, "Go Go Go with Ringo", also reflected the Beatlemania of the time. The single did not chart or get much airplay, and the Whippets broke up.

Jan Kerouac lived much of her early life in poverty, sometimes turning to prostitution to survive. She traveled widely, living in South America, Europe, and many different cities in the United States.

== Lawsuit ==
Encouraged by Kerouac biographer Gerald Nicosia, she entered into a lawsuit in the 1990s that claimed the will of Jack's mother, Gabrielle Kerouac, was a forgery, in the hope winning could expand her legal rights to her father's works and physical property. Eventually a court ruled that the will was a forgery, although in practical terms this ruling changed nothing concerning control of the Kerouac estate.

== Novels ==
Kerouac published three semi-autobiographical novels, Baby Driver: A Story About Myself in 1981, Trainsong in 1988 and posthumously published Parrot Fever in 2005.

== Death ==
On June 5, 1996, Kerouac died in Albuquerque, New Mexico, a day after her spleen was removed. She had suffered kidney failure five years earlier and was on dialysis.

== Filmography ==
- The Beat Generation: An American Dream (1988)
- What Happened to Kerouac? (1986)

== Bibliography ==
=== Books by Kerouac ===
- Kerouac, Jan (1981). Baby Driver: A Story About Myself (1st ed.). New York City: St. Martin's Press. ISBN 0030625386.
- Kerouac, Jan (June 22, 1998). Baby Driver: A Story About Myself (Expanded ed.). Boston, Massachusetts: Da Capo Press. ISBN 1560251840.
- Kerouac, Jan (1988). Trainsong (1 ed.). New York City: Henry Holt and Company.
- Kerouac, Jan (August 14, 1998). Trainsong. Thunder's Mouth Press. ISBN 1560251654.
- Kerouac, Jan (2000). Parrot Fever. Thunder's Mouth Press. ISBN 1560252081. Written in 1992–1993, and published posthumously.

=== Books about Kerouac ===
- Nicosia, Gerald (2009). Jan Kerouac: A Life In Memory. Noodlebrain Press. ISBN 978-0615245546.
