= Carolyn Cassady =

American writer (1923–2013)

- Born: Carolyn Elizabeth Robinson; April 28, 1923; Lansing, Michigan, U.S.
- Died: September 20, 2013 (aged 90); Bracknell, Berkshire, England
- Occupations: Writer, artist
- Known for: Memoirs of the Beat Generation
- Notable work: Heart Beat: My Life with Jack and Neal (1976); Off the Road (1990)
- Movement: Beat Generation
- Children: 3

Carolyn Elizabeth Robinson Cassady (April 28, 1923 – September 20, 2013) was an American writer who was associated with the Beat Generation through her marriage to Neal Cassady and her friendships with Jack Kerouac, Allen Ginsberg, and other prominent Beat figures. She became a frequent character in the works of Jack Kerouac.

== Early life ==
Carolyn Elizabeth Robinson was born in Lansing, Michigan, on April 28, 1923. The youngest of five siblings, her father Charles S. Robinson was a college professor of nutrition and biochemist and her mother a former English teacher. They raised their children according to strict conventional values. She spent the first eight years of her childhood in East Lansing, then the family moved to Nashville, Tennessee, where she attended the Ward-Belmont College Preparatory School for Girls. Although she enjoyed the school, she was less happy with Nashville, and chose to spend her summers in Glen Lake, Michigan.

After the move to Nashville, she developed her lifelong interest in the fine arts and theater arts. She began formal art lessons at age 9, sold her first portrait at age 14, and continued her interest in portrait painting as an adult. At age 12, she joined the Nashville Community Playhouse, where she won awards for set designs, and became the head of the make-up department at age 16. She secured a scholarship to Bennington College, where she initially studied art and then switched to drama.

== Education ==
In 1943, she studied for six months in New York City. Until her roommate and she could find an apartment of their own, they were hosted by playwright Robert E. Sherwood. By day, she worked for Dazian's fabric company; by night, she studied at Traphagen School of Fashion. She browsed the local museums such as the Metropolitan Museum of Art and the Museum of Modern Art (MoMA) for obscure patterns and fabrics. She attended Broadway theatre productions, witnessed the beginning of the American Ballet Theatre, and took in performances of the biggest swing bands of the era. Both her roommate and she became air raid wardens, serving as auxiliary members of the NYPD.

At Bennington College, Carolyn took classes with Martha Graham, Erich Fromm, Peter Drucker, Francis Ferguson, and Theodore Roethke, obtaining her Bachelor of Arts degree in Stanislavsky drama in 1944. After graduation, she became an occupational therapist for the U.S. Army, and served at Torney General Hospital in Palm Springs, California. When WWII ended, she returned to Nashville to continue her work at the Nashville Community Playhouse, paint, and recover from her war experiences.

In 1946, she moved to Denver, Colorado, to study for her master's degree in fine arts and theater arts at the University of Denver. She worked as a teaching assistant and began a theater arts department for the Denver Art Museum.

== Involvement with the Beat Generation ==
In March 1947, Carolyn met Neal Cassady, Jack Kerouac, and Allen Ginsberg. Allen stayed in her residence hotel apartment for two weeks before finding an apartment of his own, and Jack accompanied her to rehearsals at the university. In the evenings, Carolyn, Neal, and Jack frequented Denver's clubs to dance and hear music. During this period, Carolyn and Neal began their love affair, though at the time he was still married to his first wife, Lu Anne Henderson. In August 1947, Carolyn was shocked to find Lu Anne, Neal, and Allen naked in bed together. She decided her brief romance with Neal was over and departed for Hollywood on the promise of a job as costume designer for Western Costume Company. While waiting for the job to open, Carolyn moved north to San Francisco, staying initially with an older married sister before finding temporary work and an apartment of her own.

In a 2008 interview with literary magazine Notes from the Underground, Cassady stated, "As far as I'm concerned, the Beat Generation was something made up by the media and Allen Ginsberg." She went on to say that Jack Kerouac could not stand the public image that was created for him.

== Marriage to Neal Cassady ==
When the job as costume designer finally came through, she declined because she was pregnant. Neal followed her to California and they married on April 1, 1948. On September 7, 1948, Carolyn gave birth to a daughter, Cathleen Joanne, the first of their three children. Neal worked at various jobs, finally becoming a brakeman for the Southern Pacific Railroad. His new wife expected life to settle down, but that December, he spent their savings on a new maroon Hudson and made a trip with his friend Al Hinkle and Lu Anne to connect with Kerouac in North Carolina. Although Neal did make provisions for Carolyn and baby Cathy's care, she considered Neal's sudden departure desertion and told him not to return. The story was immortalized in Kerouac's On the Road. Believing the marriage was finished, Carolyn moved with her infant daughter to an apartment near Mission Dolores in San Francisco.

At the end of January 1949, Neal dropped Jack and LuAnne off on a San Francisco street corner and was back in Carolyn's life. Neal took care of baby Cathleen during the day, while Carolyn worked as an assistant to a radiologist. In San Francisco, Jack spent a few days as a guest in their apartment before returning to New York. After Neal resumed work with the Southern Pacific Railroad, the family moved to better housing. In 1952, Jack joined them for several months, beginning to write Visions of Neal, which later became On the Road, Visions of Cody, and other works. With Neal's encouragement, Carolyn and Jack began an affair that continued until 1960. In 1953, Jack joined Neal working as a brakeman for the Southern Pacific Railroad, and he lived with them after they moved to San Jose, California.

In an interview with American Legends website, Carolyn talked about Neal's role in On the Road and his friendship with Jack Kerouac: "Neal had mixed emotions about his role in On the Road. Of course, he got a little ego boost but mainly he was unhappy about it because Jack glorified all the aspects about his character he was trying so hard to overcome. Jack may have intuited Neal's feelings somewhat because he often wrote that he hoped no one felt badly about his writing about them. Neal certainly did not resent Jack's fame. There were never two more mutual admirers than those two."

Carolyn and Neal had two more children, a daughter, Jami, and a son, John Allen, who was named after Jack (Jean-Louis) Kerouac and Allen Ginsberg. After receiving compensation from a railroad injury, they bought a home in Monte Sereno, California, which was then part of Los Gatos, a suburb about 50 miles south of San Francisco. Jack, Allen, and the other Beat writers often visited their Monte Sereno home.

Carolyn continued to paint portraits and became costume designer and make-up artist for the Los Gatos Academy of Dance, the Wagon Stagers, the San Jose Opera Company, the San Jose Light Opera Company, and the drama club of the University of Santa Clara. In 1958, Neal was arrested by narcotic agents to whom he had given three marijuana cigarettes. He was accused of drug trafficking and served two years at San Quentin State Prison, leaving Carolyn to take care of their children and fend for herself on welfare. During this period, she also continued her painting and theater work.

After Neal was released from prison, he lost his railroad job for good and became progressively less reliable. When his parole ended in 1963, Carolyn decided to divorce him, mostly to free him from the burden of family obligations, a decision she later regretted. Without employment or family to anchor him, Neal joined Ken Kesey's band of Merry Pranksters and embarked on an endless series of road trips, dying in San Miguel de Allende, Mexico on February 4, 1968, four days short of his 42nd birthday. Although the exact cause of Neal's death was never determined, it is believed to have been caused by a combination of drug/alcohol use and exposure to the elements.

== Later life and death ==
Carolyn worked at a local newspaper and for radiologists, and she also extended her theater activities. In 1970, Doubleday commissioned her to write her memoirs of her life with Neal and Jack. However, she was unable to secure permission to print Kerouac's letters, and the book was temporarily shelved. Published in 1976, her memoir Heart Beat: My Life with Jack and Neal was later made into the 1980 movie Heart Beat starring Sissy Spacek as Carolyn.

Carolyn was a founding member of the Academy of Parapsychology and Medicine (APM), and during the early 1970s, served for four years as their correspondence secretary. In that capacity, she met many in the occult and medical world, including Uri Geller, Andrija Puharich, the Findhorn people, and astronaut Edgar Mitchell, who started an institution much like APM after he had seen Earth as a blue jewel. She also became acquainted with eminent astrologer Dane Rudhyar, and she corresponded with one of the Russian scientists behind the book Psychic Discoveries Behind the Iron Curtain. When APM closed, she served as office manager for a company that imported bamboo stakes from China to stock American nurseries.

After all three children had married and left home, Carolyn longed for more cultural life than was available in the San Francisco suburbs. Her ancestors were all buried in England, and she had been brought up with many English customs, so in 1983, she moved to England. With London as her home base, she traveled extensively in Europe, Scandinavia, and the Soviet Union, making many friends. In 1990, her memoirs were finally published in London as Off the Road: Twenty Years with Cassady, Kerouac and Ginsberg. Carolyn participated in the 2011 documentary film Love Always, Carolyn, in which she claims she is fighting a losing battle for the truth about Neal Cassady and Kerouac. She made her home in the English county of Berkshire, living near the town of Bracknell, about an hour outside London.

After lapsing into a coma after an emergency appendectomy, Carolyn died at the age of 90 on September 20, 2013, at her home in Bracknell.

== Depicted in fiction ==
In Kerouac's novel On the Road, Carolyn's character is named "Camille". In the film adaptation On the Road (2012), Camille is portrayed by Kirsten Dunst. She also appears as "Evelyn Pomeray" in Kerouac's books Big Sur, Desolation Angels, Visions of Cody, and Book of Dreams. In John Clellon Holmes' novel Go, she appears as "Marilyn".

== Bibliography ==
- Heart Beat: My Life with Jack and Neal (1976) ISBN 978-0916870034
- Off the Road: My Years with Cassady, Kerouac and Ginsberg (1996) ISBN 978-0140153903
