= Love Always, Carolyn =

- Directed by: Malin Korkeasalo, Maria Ramström
- Written by: Malin Korkeasalo, Maria Ramström
- Produced by: Margarete Jangård, Fredrik Gertten, Lina Bertilsson
- Cinematography: Maria Ramström, Malin Korkeasalo
- Edited by: Bernhard Winkler, Stefan Sundlöf
- Music by: Jan Strand (composer)
- Production company: WG Film
- Release date: April 23, 2011 (Tribeca)
- Running time: 70 minutes
- Country: Sweden
- Language: English

Love Always, Carolyn is a 2011 English-language Swedish documentary film written and directed by Malin Korkeasalo and Maria Ramström. The film is about Carolyn Cassady's recollection of life with husband Neal Cassady and Jack Kerouac, and her concern that the truth about these men is being lost in their mythos. It features interviews with Carolyn Cassady and her children as well as archive footage. The film premiered at the 2011 Tribeca Film Festival.
