= Al Hinkle =

Person associated with the Beat Generation

- Born: Albert Clyde Hinkle; September 4, 1926; Florida, U.S.
- Died: December 26, 2018 (aged 92); San Jose, California, U.S.
- Education: San Francisco State College, Stanford University
- Occupations: Railroad brakeman, conductor
- Writing career
- Movement: Beat

Al Hinkle (September 4, 1926 – December 26, 2018) was a childhood friend of Beat Generation icon Neal Cassady who was the inspiration for the character of Ed Dunkel in Jack Kerouac’s On the Road. In December 1948 Hinkle contributed $100 to the down payment on the 1949 Hudson automobile that Cassady drove across the United States, the journey memorialized in Kerouac’s novel. He was also the real life inspiration for characters in two other Kerouac books: Slim Buckle in Visions of Cody and Ed Buckle in Book of Dreams.

Hinkle is credited with convincing Cassady to move from Denver to the San Francisco Bay Area to work on the Southern Pacific railroad. Kerouac followed, and briefly worked as a brakeman. Poet Allen Ginsberg, another Hinkle friend, also came out from New York. The independent thinkers formed the nucleus of what became known as the Beat Generation, a precursor of the San Francisco-centered counterculture movement in the 1960s.

Hinkle never sought fame or fortune from his association with famous friends and lived in relative obscurity until the weekly Metro Silicon Valley placed him and his wife Helen on its cover in 1992. In 2012, Hinkle published a small book of recollections based on an interview with Stephen D. Edington entitled “Last Man Standing.”

"I love having lived my life with liberty and freedom. I guess Jack was right; here I am today, 85 years old, the 'last man standing' as they call me, only with my own Facebook page instead of a bench outside the Silver Dollar, telling my tales to a whole new generation of 'youngsters' from all around the world who understand and respect what the Beats stood for. I am honored to be a part of it all," Hinkle said.

== Death ==
Hinkle outlived his better-known Beat contemporaries and died of heart failure at the age of 92 in a Los Gatos, California hospital.
