= On the Road =

1957 novel by Jack Kerouac

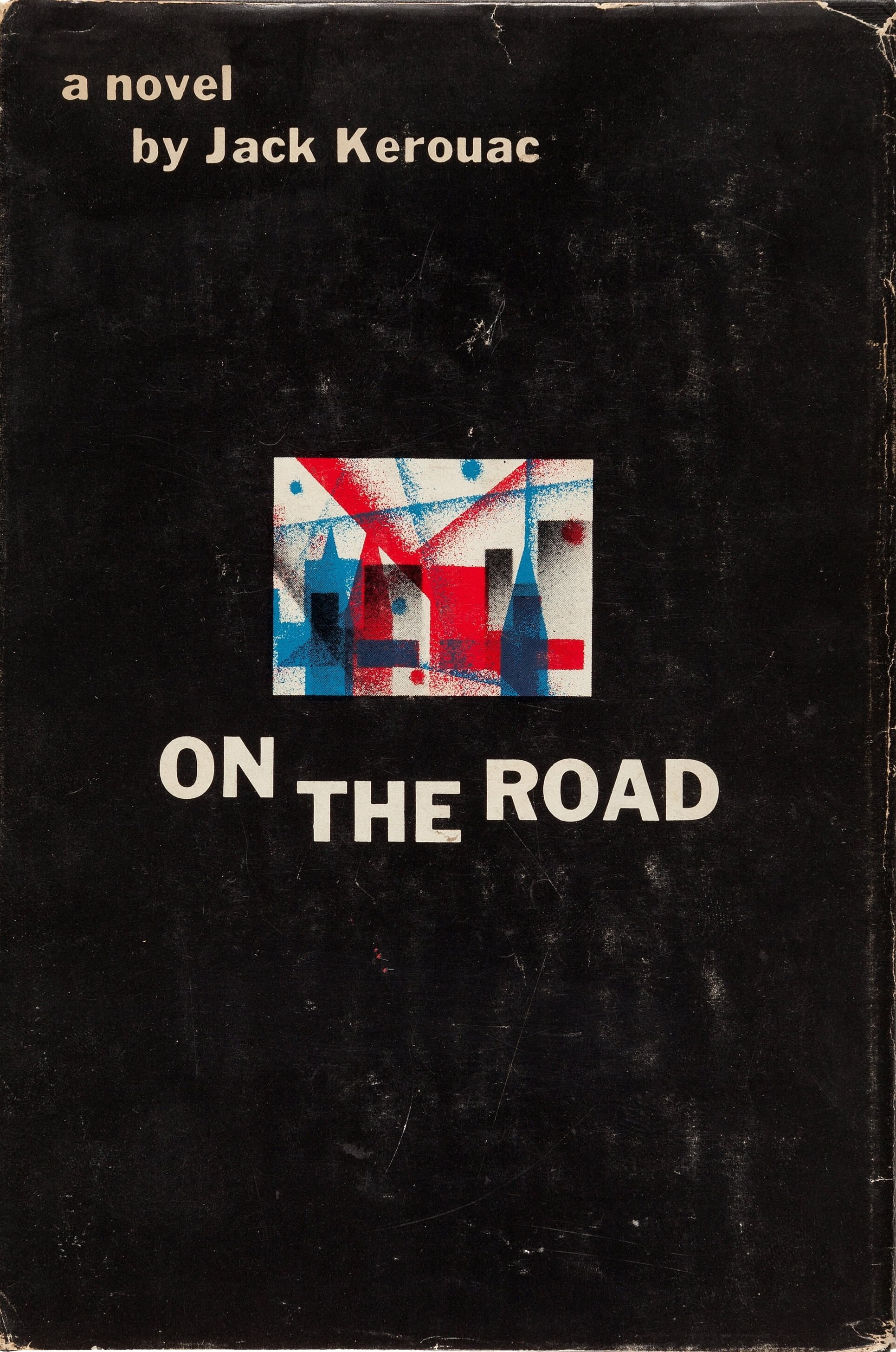
- First edition cover
- Author: Jack Kerouac
- Cover artist: Bill English
- Language: English
- Genre: Beat, stream of consciousness
- Set in: New York, Chicago, Denver, San Francisco, elsewhere in the U.S., and Mexico, 1947–1950
- Publisher: Viking Press
- Publication date: September 5, 1957
- Publication place: United States
- Media type: Print (hardback & paperback)
- Pages: 320 pages
- OCLC: 43419454
- Preceded by: The Town and the City (1950)
- Followed by: The Subterraneans (1958)

On the Road is a 1957 novel by American author Jack Kerouac, inspired by his travels across the United States. It is widely regarded as a defining work of the postwar Beat Generation, following a group of friends living for the moment against a backdrop of jazz, poetry, and rebellion.

The novel is a roman à clef, featuring characters based on central figures of the Beat movement. Kerouac appears as the narrator under the name Sal Paradise. The idea for the book developed during the late 1940s through a series of notebooks and was later typed on a continuous reel of paper over a three-week period in April 1951. It was first published by Viking Press in 1957.

The New York Times hailed the book's appearance as "the most beautifully executed, the clearest, and the most important utterance yet made by the generation Kerouac, himself, named years ago as 'beat', and whose principal avatar he is." In 1998, the Modern Library ranked On the Road 55th on its list of the 100 best English-language novels of the 20th century. The novel was chosen by Time magazine as one of the 100 best English-language novels from 1923 to 2005.

== Plot ==
The two main characters of the book are the narrator, Sal Paradise, and his friend Dean Moriarty, much admired for his carefree attitude and sense of adventure, a free-spirited maverick eager to explore all kicks and an inspiration and catalyst for Sal's travels. The novel contains five parts, three of them describing road trips with Dean. The narrative takes place in the years 1947 to 1950, is full of Americana, and marks a specific era in jazz history, "somewhere between its Charlie Parker Ornithology period and another period that began with Miles Davis" (Pt. 1, Ch. 3). The novel is largely autobiographical, Sal being the alter ego of the author and Dean standing for Neal Cassady. Like Kerouac, Sal Paradise is a writer who published two books over the course of the plot, even though the names are not told.

=== Part One ===
The first section describes Sal's first trip to San Francisco. Disheartened after a divorce, his life changes when he meets Dean Moriarty and begins to long for the freedom of the road. In July 1947, he sets off from his aunt's house in Paterson, New Jersey, with $50 (equivalent to $670 in 2025) in his pocket. After taking several buses and hitchhiking, he arrives in Denver, Colorado, where he meets up with Carlo Marx, Dean, and their friends. There are parties—among them an excursion to the ghost town of Central City. Eventually, Sal leaves by bus and gets to San Francisco, where he meets Remi Boncoeur and his girlfriend Lee Ann. Remi arranges for Sal to take a job as a night watchman at a boarding camp for merchant sailors waiting for their ship. Not holding this job for long, Sal hits the road again. Soon he meets Terry, whom he described as a cute Mexican girl, on the bus to Los Angeles. They stay together, traveling back to Bakersfield, then to Sabinal, "her hometown", where her family works in the fields. Working in the cotton fields, Sal realizes that he is not made for this type of work. Leaving Terry behind, he takes a bus back east to Pittsburgh, and then hitchhikes his way to Times Square in New York City. Once there he bums a quarter off a preacher who looks the other way, and arrives at his aunt's house, just missing Dean, who had come to see him, by two days.

=== Part Two ===
In December 1948, Sal is celebrating Christmas with his relatives in Testament, Virginia, when Dean shows up with Marylou (having left his second wife, Camille, and their newborn baby, Amy, in San Francisco) and Ed Dunkel. Sal's Christmas plans are shattered, as Dean makes him long for the road. First they drive to New York, where they meet Carlo and party. Dean wants Sal to have sex with Marylou, but Sal declines. In Dean's Hudson, they depart from New York in January 1949 and make it to New Orleans. In Algiers, they stay with the morphine-addicted Old Bull Lee and his wife, Jane. Galatea Dunkel joins her husband in New Orleans while Sal, Dean and Marylou continue their trip. Once in San Francisco, Dean again leaves Marylou to be with Camille. Both of them stay briefly in a hotel, but soon she moves out, following a nightclub owner. Sal is alone and on Market Street has visions of past lives, birth and rebirth. Dean finds him and invites him to stay with his family. Together, they visit nightclubs and listen to Slim Gaillard and other jazz musicians. The stay ends on a sour note, and Sal departs, taking the bus back to New York.

=== Part Three ===
In the spring of 1949, Sal takes a bus from New York to Denver. He is depressed and lonesome; none of his friends are around. After receiving some money, he leaves Denver for San Francisco to see Dean. Camille is pregnant and unhappy, and Dean has injured his thumb trying to hit Marylou for having sex with other men. Camille throws them out, and Sal invites Dean to come to New York, planning to travel further to Italy. They meet Galatea, who scolds Dean regarding his choices. After a night of jazz and drinking on Folsom Street in Little Harlem, they depart. On the way to Sacramento, they meet a "fag", who propositions them. Dean tries to hustle some money out of this but is turned down. During this part of the trip, Sal and Dean have ecstatic discussions having found "IT" and "TIME". In Denver, a brief argument shows the growing rift between the two, when Dean reminds Sal of his age, Sal being the older of the two. They get a 1947 Cadillac that needs to be taken to Chicago from a travel bureau. Dean drives most of the way, crazy, careless, often speeding at over one hundred miles per hour (160 km/h), delivering the car in a disheveled state. By bus, they move on to Detroit and spend a night on Skid Row, Dean hoping to find his homeless father. From Detroit they share a ride to New York and arrive at Sal's aunt's new flat on Long Island. They go on partying in New York, where Dean meets Inez and gets her pregnant while his wife is expecting their second child.

=== Part Four ===
In the spring of 1950, Sal gets the itch to travel again while Dean is working as a parking lot attendant in Manhattan, living with his girlfriend Inez. Sal notices that he has been reduced to simple pleasures—listening to basketball games and looking at erotic playing cards. By bus, Sal takes to the road again, passing Washington, D.C., Ashland, Cincinnati, and St. Louis, and eventually reaching Denver. There, he meets Stan Shephard, and the two plan to go to Mexico City when they learn that Dean has bought a car and is on the way to join them. In a rickety '37 Ford sedan the three set off across Texas to Laredo, where they cross the border. They are ecstatic, having left "everything behind us and entering a new and unknown phase of things". Their money buys more (10 cents for a beer), police are laid back, cannabis is readily available and people are curious and friendly. The landscape is magnificent. In Gregoria, they meet Victor, a local kid, who leads them to a bordello where they have their last grand party, dancing to mambo, drinking and having fun with prostitutes. In Mexico City, Sal becomes ill from dysentery and is "delirious and unconscious". Dean leaves him, and Sal later reflects: "When I got better I realized what a rat he was, but then I had to understand the impossible complexity of his life, how he had to leave me there, sick, to get on with his wives and woes."

=== Part Five ===
Dean, having obtained divorce papers in Mexico, had first returned to New York to marry Inez, only to leave her and go back to Camille. After his recovery from dysentery, Sal returns to New York in the fall. He finds a girl, Laura, and plans to move with her to San Francisco. Sal writes to Dean about his plan to move to San Francisco. Dean writes back saying that he is willing to come and accompany Laura and Sal. Dean arrives more than five weeks early, but Sal is out taking a late-night walk alone. Sal returns home, sees a copy of Proust, and knows it is Dean's. Sal realizes his friend has arrived, but at a time when Sal does not have the money to relocate to San Francisco. On hearing this Dean makes the decision to head back to Camille, Sal's friend Remi Boncoeur denies Sal's request to give Dean a short lift to 40th Street on their way to a Duke Ellington concert at the Metropolitan Opera House. Sal's girlfriend Laura realizes this is a painful moment for Sal and prompts him for a response as the party drives off without Dean. Sal replies: "He'll be alright." Sal later reflects as he sits on a river pier under a New Jersey night sky about the roads and lands of America that he has traveled and states: "... I think of Dean Moriarty, I even think of Old Dean Moriarty the father we never found, I think of Dean Moriarty."

== Characters ==
Kerouac often based his fictional characters on friends and family.

Because of the objections of my early publishers I was not allowed to use the same personae names in each work.

Real-life person	Character name
Jack Kerouac	Sal Paradise
Gabrielle Kerouac (Jack Kerouac's mother)	Sal Paradise's Aunt
Joan Kerouac (born Haverty)	Laura
Alan Ansen	Rollo Greb
William S. Burroughs	Old Bull Lee
Joan Vollmer Adams Burroughs	Jane Lee
William S. Burroughs Jr.	Ray Lee
Julie Burroughs	Dodie Lee
Lucien Carr	Damion
Neal Cassady	Dean Moriarty
Neal Cassady Sr.	Old Dean Moriarty
Neal Cassady's cousin	Sam Brady
Carolyn Cassady	Camille
Jamie Cassady	Joanie Moriarty
Cathleen Cassady	Amy Moriarty
Bea Franco (Beatrice Kozera)	Terry
Allen Ginsberg	Carlo Marx
John Clellon Holmes	Ian MacArthur
Herbert Huncke	Elmer Hassel
William Holmes "Big Slim" Hubbard	William Holmes "Big Slim" Hazard
Ruth Gullion	Rita Bettencourt
Helen Gullion	Mary Bettencourt
Diana Hansen	Inez
Beverly Burford	Babe Rawlins
Bob Burford	Ray Rawlins
Dianne Orin	Lee Ann
Henri Cru	Remi Boncœur
Paul Blake (Jack Kerouac's brother-in-law)	Rocco
Al Hinkle	Ed Dunkel
Helen Hinkle	Galatea Dunkel
Bill Tomson	Roy Johnson
Helen Tomson (Bill Tomson's wife)	Dorothy Johnson
Jim Holmes	Tommy Snark
Gregorio	Victor
Frank Jeffries	Stan Shepard
Gene Pippin	Gene Dexter
Jinny Baker Lehrman	Jinny Jones
Victorino Tejera	Victor Villanueva
Walter Adams	Walter Evans
Jose García Villa	Angel Luz García
Ed Uhl	Ed Wall
Justin W. Brierly	Denver D. Doll
Ed White	Tim Gray
Joanie White (Ed White's sister)	Betty Gray
LuAnne Henderson	Marylou
Pauline	Lucille
Vicki Russell	Dorie, "Tall redhead"
Rhoda	Mona
Ed Stringham	Tom Saybrook
Kells Elvins	Dale
Lorraine	Marie
Alan Harrington	Hal Hingham
Ginger Chase	Peaches
Haldon "Hal" Chase	Chad King
Allan Temko	Roland Major
Gregory La Cava	"The famous director"
	Mr. Snow

== Production and publication ==
After Kerouac dropped out of Columbia University, he served as a Merchant Marine on several different sailing vessels, before returning to New York to write. He met and mixed with Beat Generation figures Allen Ginsberg, William Burroughs and Neal Cassady. Between 1947 and 1950, while writing what would become The Town and the City (1950), Kerouac engaged in the road adventures that would form On the Road. Kerouac carried small notebooks, in which much of the text was written as the eventful span of road trips unfurled. He started working on the first of several versions of the novel as early as 1948, based on experiences during his first long road trip in 1947, but he remained dissatisfied with the novel. Inspired by a 10,000-word rambling letter from Cassady, Kerouac, in 1950, outlined the "Essentials of Spontaneous Prose" and decided to tell the story of his years on the road with Cassady, as if writing a letter to a friend in a form that reflected the improvisational fluidity of jazz. In a letter to a student in 1961, Kerouac wrote: "Dean and I were embarked on a journey through post-Whitman America to FIND that America and to FIND the inherent goodness in American man. It was really a story about two Catholic buddies, roaming the country, in search of God. And we found him."

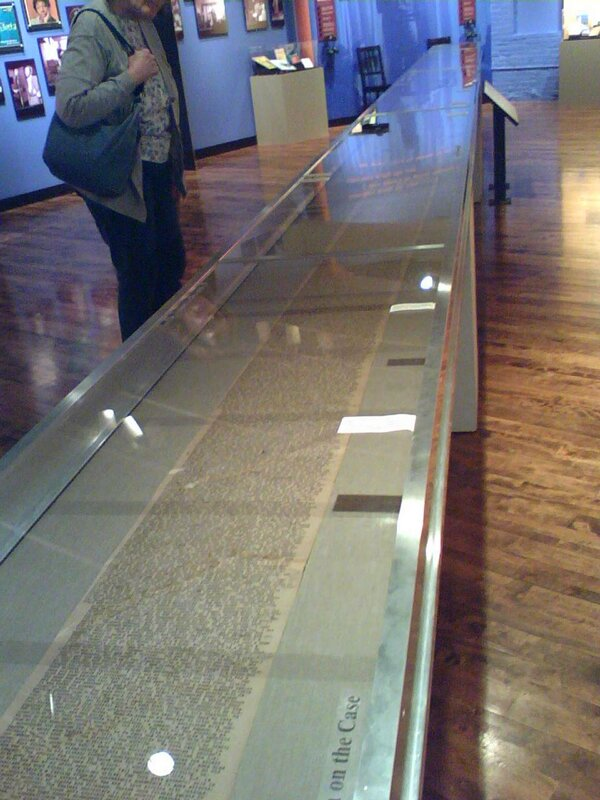
The scroll, exhibited at the Boott Cotton Mills Museum in 2007

The first draft of what was to become the published novel was written in three weeks in April 1951, while Kerouac lived with Joan Haverty, his second wife, at 454 West 20th Street in New York City's Manhattan. The manuscript was typed on what he called "the scroll"—a continuous, 120-foot (37 m) scroll of tracing paper sheets that he cut to size and taped together. The roll was typed single-spaced, without margins or paragraph breaks. In the following years, Kerouac continued to revise this manuscript, deleting some sections (including some sexual depictions deemed pornographic in the 1950s) and adding smaller literary passages. Kerouac wrote a number of inserts intended for On the Road between 1951 and 1952, before eventually omitting them from the manuscript and using them to form the basis of another work, Visions of Cody (1951–1952). On the Road was championed within Viking Press by Malcolm Cowley and was published by Viking in 1957, based on revisions of the 1951 manuscript. Besides differences in formatting, the published novel was shorter than the original scroll manuscript and used pseudonyms for all of the major characters.

Viking Press released a slightly edited version of the original manuscript, titled On the Road: The Original Scroll (August 16, 2007), corresponding with the 50th anniversary of original publication. This version has been transcribed and edited by English academic and novelist Howard Cunnell. As well as containing material that was excised from the original draft, due to its explicit nature, the scroll version also uses the real names of the protagonists, so Neal Cassady becomes Dean Moriarty and Allen Ginsberg becomes Carlo Marx, etc.

In 2007, Gabriel Anctil, a journalist of Montreal daily Le Devoir, discovered in Kerouac's personal archives in New York almost 200 pages of his writings entirely in Quebec French, with colloquialisms. The collection included 10 manuscript pages of an unfinished version of On the Road, written on January 19, 1951.

The original scroll of On the Road was bought in 2001 by Jim Irsay for $2.43 million (equivalent to $4.42 million in 2025). It has occasionally been made available for public viewing, with the first 30 feet (9 m) unrolled. Between 2004 and 2012, the scroll was displayed in several museums and libraries in the United States, Ireland, and the UK. It was exhibited in Paris, in the summer of 2012, to celebrate the movie based on the book.

In 2026 Zach Bryan paid $12.1 million for the scroll at auction.

== Reception ==
On the Road received mixed critical reactions upon its publication in 1957. While some early reviewers of the book spoke favorably of it, the backlash to these reviews was swift and strong. Since its publication, critical attention has focused on issues of both the context and the style, addressing the actions of the characters as well as the nature of Kerouac's prose.

=== Initial reaction ===
In his review for The New York Times, Gilbert Millstein wrote, "...its publication is a historic occasion in so far as the exposure of an authentic work of art is of any great moment in an age in which the attention is fragmented and the sensibilities are blunted by the superlatives of fashion" and praised it as "a major novel." Millstein was already sympathetic toward the Beat Generation and his promotion of the book in the Times did wonders for its recognition and acclaim. Not only did he like the themes, but also the style, which would come to be just as hotly contested in the reviews that followed. "There are sections of On the Road in which the writing is of a beauty almost breathtaking ... there is some writing on jazz that has never been equaled in American fiction, either for insight, style, or technical virtuosity." Kerouac and Joyce Johnson, a younger writer he was living with, read the review shortly after midnight at a newsstand at 69th Street and Broadway, near Joyce's apartment on the Upper West Side. They took their copy of the newspaper to a neighborhood bar and read the review over and over. "Jack kept shaking his head," Joyce remembered later in her memoir Minor Characters, "as if he couldn't figure out why he wasn't happier than he was." Finally, they returned to her apartment to go to sleep. As Joyce recalled: "Jack lay down obscure for the last time in his life. The ringing phone woke him the next morning, and he was famous."

A backlash began a few days later in the same publication. David Dempsey published a review that contradicted most of what Millstein had promoted in the book. "As a portrait of a disjointed segment of society acting out of its own neurotic necessity, On the Road, is a stunning achievement. But it is a road, as far as the characters are concerned, that leads to nowhere". While he did not discount the stylistic nature of the text (saying that it was written "with great relish"), he dismissed the content as a "passionate lark" rather than a novel.

Other reviewers were also less than impressed. Phoebe Lou Adams in Atlantic Monthly wrote that it "disappoints because it constantly promises a revelation or a conclusion of real importance and general applicability, and cannot deliver any such conclusion because Dean is more convincing as an eccentric than as a representative of any segment of humanity." While she liked the writing and found a good theme, her concern was repetition. "Everything Mr. Kerouac has to say about Dean has been told in the first third of the book, and what comes later is a series of variations on the same theme."

Robert Kirsch in The Los Angeles Times said, "Mr. Kerouac may one day be a good writer, but that day will come when he stops riding around in a compulsive search for "material" and settles down to learn some of the first things about the craft...Mr. Kerouac calls this "The Beat Generation," but a much more accurate description would be "The Deadbeat Generation." I don't know whether such people really exist, but if they do, he has thoroughly failed to make them believable."

The review from Time exhibited a similar sentiment. "The post-World War II generation—beat or beatific—has not found symbolic spokesmen with anywhere near the talents of Fitzgerald, Hemingway, or Nathanael West. In this novel, talented Author Kerouac, 35, does not join that literary league, either, but at least suggests that his generation is not silent. With his barbaric yawp of a book, Kerouac commands attention as a kind of literary James Dean." It considers the book partly a travel book and partly a collection of journal jottings. While Kerouac sees his characters as "mad to live ... desirous of everything at the same time," the reviewer likens them to cases of "psychosis that is a variety of Ganser Syndrome" who "aren't really mad—they only seem to be."

=== Critical study ===
Thomas Pynchon described On the Road as "one of the great American novels".

On the Road has been the object of critical study since its publication. David Brooks of The New York Times compiled several opinions and summarized them in an Op-Ed from October 2, 2007. Whereas Millstein saw it as a story in which the heroes took pleasure in everything, George Mouratidis, an editor of a new edition, claimed "above all else, the story is about loss". "It's a book about death and the search for something meaningful to hold on to—the famous search for 'IT,' a truth larger than the self, which, of course, is never found," wrote Meghan O'Rourke in Slate. "Kerouac was this deep, lonely, melancholy man," Hilary Holladay of the University of Massachusetts Lowell told The Philadelphia Inquirer. "And if you read the book closely, you see that sense of loss and sorrow swelling on every page". "In truth, On the Road is a book of broken dreams and failed plans," wrote Ted Gioia in The Weekly Standard.

John Leland, author of Why Kerouac Matters: The Lessons of On the Road (They're Not What You Think), said "We're no longer shocked by the sex and drugs. The slang is passé and at times corny. Some of the racial sentimentality is appalling" but added "the tale of passionate friendship and the search for revelation are timeless. These are as elusive and precious in our time as in Sal's, and will be when our grandchildren celebrate the book's hundredth anniversary."

To Brooks, this characterization seemed limited. "Reading through the anniversary commemorations, you feel the gravitational pull of the great Boomer Narcissus. All cultural artifacts have to be interpreted through whatever experiences the Baby Boomer generation is going through at that moment. So a book formerly known for its youthful exuberance now becomes a gloomy middle-aged disillusion." He lamented that the book's spirit seems to have been tamed by the professionalism of America today and how it has only survived in parts. The more reckless and youthful parts of the text that gave it its energy are the parts that have "run afoul of the new gentility, the rules laid down by the health experts, childcare experts, guidance counselors, safety advisers, admissions officers, virtuecrats and employers to regulate the lives of the young." He claims that the "ethos" of the book has been lost.

Mary Pannicia Carden saw traveling as a way for the characters to assert their independence: they "attempt to replace the model of manhood dominant in capitalist America with a model rooted in foundational American ideals of conquest and self-discovery." "Reassigning disempowering elements of patriarchy to female keeping, they attempt to substitute male brotherhood for the nuclear family and to replace the ladder of success with the freedom of the road as primary measures of male identity."

Kerouac's writing style has attracted the attention of critics. On the Road has been considered by Tim Hunt to be a transitional phase between the traditional narrative structure of The Town and the City (1951) and the "wild form" of his later books like Visions of Cody (1972). Kerouac's own explanation of his style in "Essentials of Spontaneous Prose" (1953) is that his writing is like the Impressionist painters who sought to create art through direct observation. In his book Understanding Jack Kerouac, Matt Theado wrote that Kerouac endeavored to present a raw version of truth which did not lend itself to the traditional process of revision and rewriting but rather the emotionally charged practice of the spontaneity he pursued. Theado maintained that the personal nature of the text helps foster a direct link between Kerouac and the reader; that his casual diction and very relaxed syntax was an intentional attempt to depict events as they happened and to convey all of the energy and emotion of the experiences.

== Music in On the Road ==
Music is an important part of the scene that Kerouac sets in On the Road. Early in the book (Pt. 1, Ch. 3), he establishes the time period with references to the musical world: "At this time, 1947, bop was going like mad all over America. The fellows at the Loop blew, but with a tired air, because bop was somewhere between its Charlie Parker Ornithology period and another period that began with Miles Davis. And as I sat there listening to that sound of the night which bop has come to represent for all of us, I thought of all my friends from one end of the country to the other and how they were really all in the same vast backyard doing something so frantic and rushing-about."

Main characters Sal Paradise and Dean Moriarty are enthusiastic fans of the jazz/bebop and early rhythm-and-blues musicians and records that were in the musical mix during the years when the story took place, 1947 to 1950. Sal, Dean, and their friends are repeatedly depicted listening to specific records and going to clubs to hear their musical favorites.

For example, in one of two separate passages where they go to clubs to hear British jazz pianist George Shearing, the effect of the music is described as almost overwhelming for Dean (Pt. 2, Ch. 4): "Shearing began to play his chords; they rolled out of the piano in great rich showers, you'd think the man wouldn't have time to line them up. They rolled and rolled like the sea. Folks yelled for him to 'Go!' Dean was sweating; the sweat poured down his collar. 'There he is! That's him! Old God! Old God Shearing! Yes! Yes! Yes!' And Shearing was conscious of the madman behind him, he could hear every one of Dean's gasps and imprecations, he could sense it though he couldn't see. 'That's right!' Dean said. 'Yes!' Shearing smiled; he rocked. Shearing rose from the piano, dripping with sweat; these were his great 1949 days before he became cool and commercial. When he was gone Dean pointed to the empty piano seat. 'God's empty chair,' he said."

Kerouac mentions many other musical artists and their records throughout On the Road: Charlie Parker – "Ornithology" (Pt. 1, Ch. 3; also Pt. 3, Ch. 10); Lionel Hampton – "Central Avenue Breakdown" (Pt. 1, Ch. 13; also Pt. 4, Ch. 4); Billie Holiday – "Lover Man" (Pt.1, Ch. 13; also Pt. 3, Ch. 4); Dexter Gordon and Wardell Gray – "The Hunt" (Pt. 2, Ch. 1; Pt. 2, Ch. 4); Dizzy Gillespie – "Congo Blues" (Pt. 3, Ch. 7 – recorded under Red Norvo's name and also featuring Charlie Parker; also Pt. 3, Ch. 10; Pt. 4, Ch. 3); Willis Jackson – "Gator Tail" (Pt. 4, Ch. 1 – recorded with the Cootie Williams Orchestra); Wynonie Harris – "I Like My Baby's Pudding" (Pt. 4, Ch. 4); and Perez Prado -- "More Mambo Jambo," "Chattanooga de Mambo," "Mambo Numero Ocho" ("Mambo No. 8") (Pt. 4, Ch. 5).

Kerouac also notes several other musical artists without mentioning specific records: Miles Davis (Pt. 1, Ch. 3; Pt. 3, Ch. 10); George Shearing and his drummer Denzil Best (Pt. 2, Ch. 4; Pt. 3, Ch. 10); Slim Gaillard (Pt. 2, Ch. 11); Lester Young (Pt. 3, Ch. 10; Pt. 4, Ch. 1); Louis Armstrong (Pt. 3, Ch. 10); Roy Eldridge (Pt. 3, Ch. 10); Count Basie (Pt. 3, Ch. 10); Bennie Moten (Pt. 3, Ch. 10); Hot Lips Page (Pt. 3, Ch. 10); Thelonious Monk (Pt. 3, Ch. 10); Anita O'Day (Pt. 3, Ch. 10); Stan Getz (Pt. 4, Ch. 1); Lucky Millinder (Pt. 4, Ch. 4); and Duke Ellington (Pt. 5).

Jazz and other types of music are also featured more generally as a backdrop, with the characters often listening to music in clubs or on the radio. For example, while driving across the upper Midwest toward New York City, Sal mentions that he and Dean are listening to the radio show of well-known jazz deejay Symphony Sid Torin (Pt. 3, Ch. 11).

Kerouac also delves into the classical music genre briefly, having Sal attend a performance of Beethoven's sole opera, Fidelio (1805), in Central City, Colorado, as performed by "stars of the Metropolitan" who are visiting the area for the summer (Pt. 1, Ch. 9).

== Influence ==
On the Road has been an influence on poets, writers, actors, and musicians–including Bob Dylan, Van Morrison, Jim Morrison, Jerry Garcia, David Bowie, and Hunter S. Thompson.

From journalist Sean O'Hagan, in a 2007 article published in The Guardian:

"It changed my life like it changed everyone else's," Dylan would say many years later. Tom Waits, too, acknowledged its influence, hymning Jack and Neal in a song and calling the Beats "father figures." At least two great American photographers were influenced by Kerouac: Robert Frank, who became his close friend—Kerouac wrote the introduction to Frank's book, The Americans—and Stephen Shore, who set out on an American road trip in the 1970s with Kerouac's book as a guide. It would be hard to imagine Hunter S. Thompson's road novel Fear and Loathing in Las Vegas had On the Road not laid down the template; likewise, films such as Easy Rider, Paris, Texas, and even Thelma and Louise.

In his book Light My Fire: My Life with The Doors, Ray Manzarek (keyboard player of The Doors) wrote, "I suppose if Jack Kerouac had never written On the Road, The Doors would never have existed."

On the Road influenced an entire generation of musicians, poets, and writers including Allen Ginsberg. Because of Ginsberg's friendship with Kerouac, Ginsberg was written into the novel through the character Carlo Marx. Ginsberg recalled that he was attracted to the beat generation, and Kerouac, because the beats valued "detachment from the existing society," while at the same time calling for an immediate release from a culture in which the most "freely" accessible items—bodies and ideas—seemed restricted. Ginsberg incorporated a sense of freedom of prose and style into his poetry as a result of the influence of Kerouac.

Eric Kripke, creator of long-running series Supernatural, has also cited On the Road as a major inspiration for the fantasy series.

The title of Sarah Schulman's novel Girls, Visions and Everything is taken from a line in On the Road, and the protagonist imitates Kerouac's lifestyle.

== Film adaptation ==
A film adaptation of On the Road had been proposed in 1957 when Jack Kerouac wrote a one-page letter to actor Marlon Brando, suggesting that he play Dean Moriarty while Kerouac would portray Sal Paradise. Brando never responded to the letter; later Warner Bros. offered $110,000 for the rights to Kerouac's book, but his agent, Sterling Lord, declined it, hoping for a $150,000 deal from Paramount Pictures, which did not occur.

The film rights were bought in 1980 by producer Francis Ford Coppola for $95,000. Coppola tried out several screenwriters, including Michael Herr, Barry Gifford, and novelist Russell Banks, even writing a draft himself with his son Roman, before settling on José Rivera. Several different plans were considered: Joel Schumacher as director, with Billy Crudup as Sal Paradise, and Colin Farrell as Dean Moriarty; then Ethan Hawke as Paradise and Brad Pitt as Moriarty; in 1995, he planned to shoot on black-and-white 16mm film and held auditions with poet Allen Ginsberg in attendance, but all those projects fell through.

After seeing Walter Salles' The Motorcycle Diaries (2004), Coppola appointed Salles to direct the movie. In preparation for the film, Salles traveled the United States, tracing Kerouac's journey and filming a documentary on the search for On the Road. Sam Riley starred as Sal Paradise. Garrett Hedlund portrayed Dean Moriarty. Kristen Stewart played Mary Lou. Kirsten Dunst portrayed Camille. The film screened at the Cannes Film Festival in 2012 and was nominated for the Palme d'Or.

In 2007, BBC Four aired Russell Brand On the Road, a documentary presented by Russell Brand and Matt Morgan about Kerouac, focusing on On the Road. In 2014 a feature documentary by Kurt Jacobsen and Warren Leming entitled American Road, which explores the mystique of the road with an ample section on Kerouac, premiered at the American Documentary Film Festival in Palm Springs and then screened at two dozen more film festivals.

== Beat Generation ==
While many critics still consider the word "beat" in its literal sense of "tired and beaten down," others, including Kerouac himself promoted the generation more in sense of "beatific" or blissful. Holmes and Kerouac published several articles in popular magazines in an attempt to explain the movement. In the November 16, 1952 New York Times Sunday Magazine, he wrote a piece exposing the faces of the Beat Generation. "[O]ne day [Kerouac] said, 'You know, this is a really beat generation' ... More than mere weariness, it implies the feeling of having been used, of being raw. It involves a sort of nakedness of mind, and ultimately, of soul: a feeling of being reduced to the bedrock of consciousness. In short, it means being undramatically pushed up against the wall of oneself." He distinguishes Beats from the Lost Generation of the 1920s pointing out how the Beats are not lost but how they are searching for answers to all of life's questions. Kerouac's preoccupation with writers like Ernest Hemingway shaped his view of the beat generation. He uses a prose style which he adapted from Hemingway and throughout On the Road he alludes to novels like The Sun Also Rises. "How to live seems much more crucial than why." In many ways, it is a spiritual journey, a quest to find belief, belonging, and meaning in life. Not content with the uniformity promoted by government and consumer culture, the Beats yearned for a deeper, more sensational experience. Holmes expands his attempt to define the generation in a 1958 article in Esquire magazine. This article was able to take more of a look back at the formation of the movement as it was published after On the Road. "It describes the state of mind from which all unessentials have been stripped, leaving it receptive to everything around it, but impatient with trivial obstructions. To be beat is to be at the bottom of your personality, looking up."

== See also ==
- Off the Road (1990 book by Carolyn Cassady)
- Love Always, Carolyn
- Jack Kerouac Reads On the Road
- List of most expensive books and manuscripts
