= John Clellon Holmes =

American novelist

- Born: March 12, 1926; Holyoke, Massachusetts, U.S.
- Died: March 30, 1988 (aged 62); Middletown, Connecticut, U.S.
- Occupations: Poet; novelist; professor

John Clellon Holmes (March 12, 1926 – March 30, 1988) was an American author, poet and professor, best known for his 1952 novel Go. Considered the first "Beat" novel, Go depicted events in his life with his friends Jack Kerouac, Neal Cassady and Allen Ginsberg. He was often referred to as the "quiet Beat" and was one of Kerouac's closest friends. Holmes also wrote what is considered the definitive jazz novel of the Beat Generation, The Horn.

== Life and career ==
He was born in Holyoke, Massachusetts, to John McClellan Holmes Sr. and Elizabeth Franklin Emmons (Betty) Holmes. He had two sisters. Holmes dropped out of high school in 1942 and moved to New York City. He attended a non-degree General Studies program at Columbia University, where he honed his passion for reading and writing.

In June 1944, Holmes was drafted into the U.S. Navy. Serving for a year, he was trained as a medic and was assigned to a San Diego naval hospital that treated sailors wounded in battles in the Pacific. He spent his last six months in the navy working at St. Albans Naval Hospital in Queens, New York. While on leave in August 1944, Holmes married Marian Milliambro, a woman three years older.

At the end of the war, Holmes found his way into Columbia University literature and philosophy classes where he worked to turn himself into a professional writer. By May 1948, Holmes, who used the pen name “Clellon Holmes” to distinguish himself from another writer named John Holmes, had his first published poem in the Partisan Review. A couple of months later, Holmes met Jack Kerouac; and in Kerouac's novel On the Road Holmes appears as the character Ian MacArthur.

Holmes is credited with helping spread the term the “Beat Generation” via a November 16, 1952 article ["This is the Beat Generation," The New York Times Magazine]in which he wrote: “The origins of the word ‘beat’ are obscure, but the meaning is only too clear to most Americans. More than a mere weariness, it implies the feeling of having been used, of being raw.” In the article, Holmes attributes the term "Beat" to Kerouac, who had acquired the idea from Herbert Huncke. Holmes came to the conclusion that the values and ambitions of the Beat Generation were symbolic of something bigger, which was the inspiration for Go, published that same year.

Holmes received a substantial advance for the paperback rights of the book, half of which went to his wife Marian, who had filed for divorce on the grounds of adultery. In 1953, Holmes married Louisiana native Shirley Allen, and they remained together until Holmes's death.

Holmes never went "On the Road." He and Shirley settled in Old Saybrook, Connecticut, where they were visited by many of the Beats including, repeatedly, Kerouac. (See Barry Gifford, Jack's Book: an Oral Biography of Jack Kerouac, 1978.) He wrote of Kerouac, "Well, if love is total involvement, deep emotional clairvoyance about the other's soul, fury & hunger all intermixed, he was the only man I ever loved. He changed my life irrevocably." Though he could match them as a talker and drinker, Holmes was more an observer, appreciator, and chronicler of beat personages like Gregory Corso, Neal Cassady and Kerouac than actively one of them. He asked Allen Ginsberg for "any and all information on your poetry and your visions," saying that "I am interested in knowing also anything you may wish to tell... about Neal, [Herbert] Huncke, Lucien [Carr] in relation to you..." Ginsberg replied with an 11-page letter detailing, as completely as he could, the nature of his "divine vision".

Holmes's 1988 Representative Men, a posthumously published volume of biographical essays, includes memory pieces about Kerouac, Ginsberg, Casssady, and Nelson Algren, an appreciation of W.C. Fields and, importantly, "Gone in October," a 40-page remembrance of attending Kerouac's 1969 wake and funeral in Lowell, Massachusetts, along with Ginsberg, Corso, and Peter Orlovsky. Among the attendants: Robert Creeley, Jimmy Breslin.

Later in life, Holmes taught at the Iowa Writers Workshop, lectured at Yale and gave workshops at Brown University. In 1975 he began teaching at the University of Arkansas and became in 1977 a tenured faculty. He died of cancer in March 1988. His wife Shirley died in April 1988.

== Bibliography ==
- Go (1952)
- The Horn (1958)
- The Philosophy of the Beat Generation (1958)
- Get Home Free (1964)
- Nothing More to Declare (1967)
- The Bowling Green Poems (1977)
- Death Drag: Selected Poems 1948–1979 (1979)
- Visitor: Jack Kerouac in Old Saybrook (1981)
- Gone in October: Last Reflections on Jack Kerouac (1985)
- Displaced Person: The Travel Essays (1987)
- Representative Men: The Biographical Essays (1988)
- Passionate Opinions: The Cultural Essays (1988)
- Dire Coasts: Poems (1988)
- Night Music: Selected Poems (1989)
