= The Town and the City =

1950 novel by Jack Kerouac

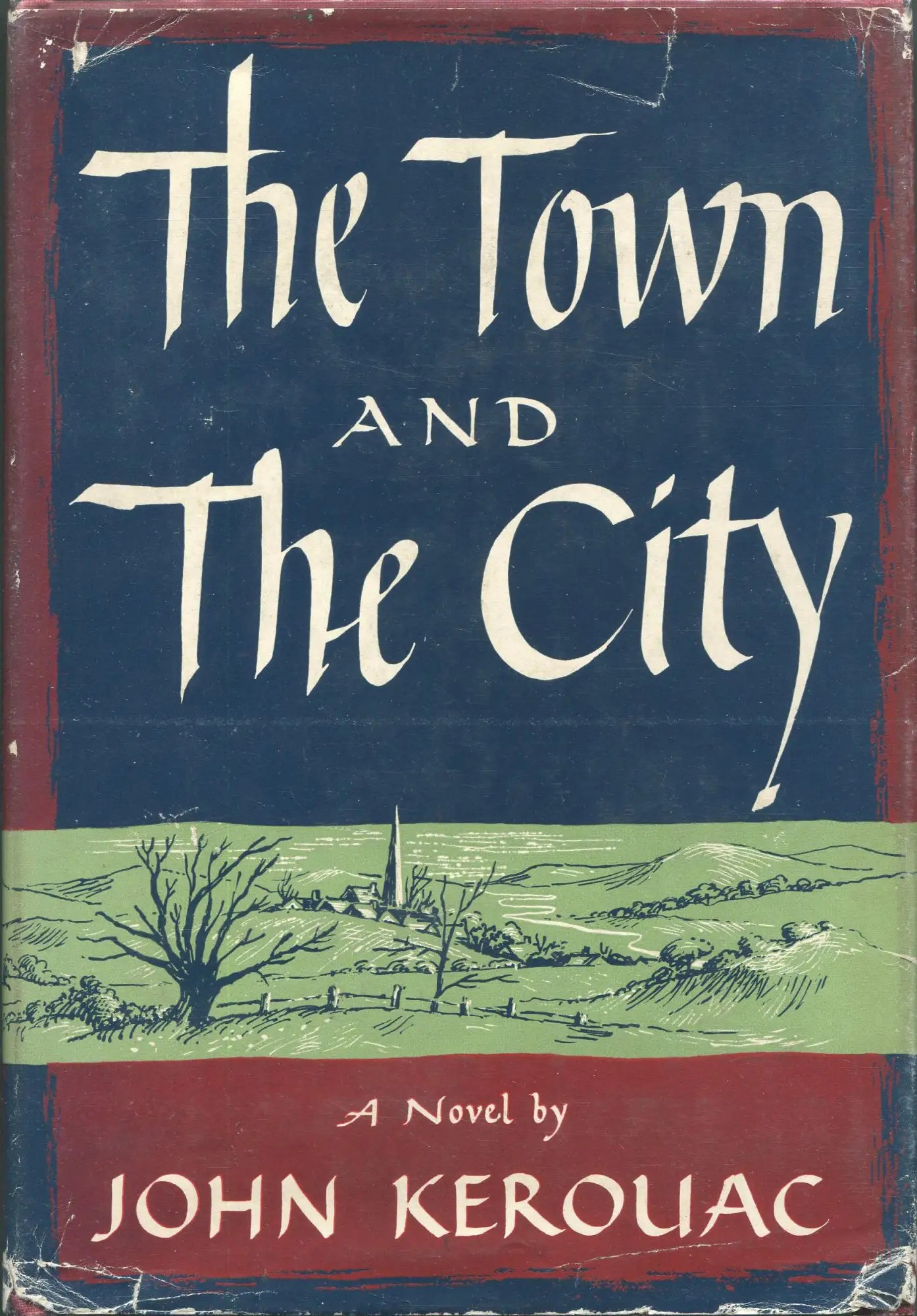
- First edition
- Author: Jack Kerouac
- Language: English
- Genre: Semi-autobiographical novel
- Publisher: Harcourt Brace
- Publication date: February 1950
- Publication place: United States
- Media type: Print (hardback & paperback)
- Pages: 499
- OCLC: 9489071
- Dewey Decimal: 813/.54 19
- LC Class: PS3521.E735 T6 1978
- Followed by: On the Road (1957)

The Town and the City is a novel by Jack Kerouac, published by Harcourt Brace in 1950. This was the first major work published by Kerouac, who later became famous for his second novel On the Road (1957). Like all of Jack Kerouac's major works, The Town and the City is essentially an autobiographical novel, though less directly so than most of his other works. The Town and the City was written in a conventional manner over a period of years, and much more novelistic license was taken with this work than after Kerouac's adoption of quickly written "spontaneous prose". The Town and the City was written before Kerouac had developed his own style, and it is heavily influenced by Thomas Wolfe (even down to the title, reminiscent of Wolfe titles such as The Web and the Rock).

The novel is focused on two locations (as suggested by the title): one, the early Beat Generation circle of New York in the late 1940s, the other, the nearly rural small town of Galloway, Massachusetts, that the main character comes from, before going off to college on a football scholarship. Galloway represents the city of Lowell, Massachusetts, which the Merrimack River runs through, and where Kerouac was raised. The experiences of the young "Peter Martin" are largely those of Jack Kerouac (he returns to the subject again in his last work Vanity of Duluoz, published in 1968). The book gives great insight in the events that shaped Jack Kerouac as a person and as a writer.

The "city" represents a number of figures of the early beat circle: Allen Ginsberg (as Leon Levinsky), Lucien Carr (as Kenneth Wood), William Burroughs (as Will Dennison), Herbert Huncke (as Junkey), David Kammerer (as Waldo Meister), Edie Parker (as Judie Smith) and also Joan Vollmer (as Mary Dennison) – though she essentially has a non-speaking role (however some of her ideas are quoted by the Ginsberg-figure). Near the end of the novel, the Waldo Meister character dies by falling from the window of Kenneth Wood's apartment (a distant echo of the real event: David Kammerer knifed by Lucien Carr, possibly in self-defense). In the novel the police largely just accept this as a suicide. A version of the events closer to the truth can be found in Vanity of Duluoz, in which Carr was arrested and eventually accepted a plea of manslaughter and a prison sentence; and Kerouac was arrested and held briefly as an accessory after the fact. Still another version of the story can be found in an early novel Kerouac collaborated on with William S. Burroughs, And the Hippos Were Boiled in Their Tanks, published after Kerouac's death.

== Publication ==
Kerouac began writing The Town and the City in late 1945, according to Ellis Amburn, who edited Kerouac's last two novels and wrote the biography Subterranean Kerouac. Heavily influenced by Thomas Wolfe, he sent the completed manuscript to Wolfe's publisher, Charles Scribner's Sons, in 1948. Kerouac told his friend Allen Ginsberg that he hoped that he would hook up with Wolfe's editor Maxwell Perkins, not knowing that Perkins had died the previous year. Scribner's rejected the book.

Ginsberg lobbied his former teacher at Columbia University (Kerouac had also attended Columbia), Mark Van Doren for help, and Van Doren set up an interview with Alfred Kazin, who worked as a scout for Harcourt Brace. Kerouac was unable to make the interview with Kazin but Ginsberg introduced Kerouac to New Yorker editor Ed Stringham, who arranged a meeting between Kerouac and the editor-in-chief of Viking Press. Kazin eventually decided to read the manuscript and if he liked it, he would pass it to the top publishers in New York. His contacts also included Houghton Mifflin, Alfred A. Knopf, Little Brown and Company, and Random House. Kazin recommended the book.

In December 1948, Scribner's again rejected the manuscript, despite changes that Kerouac had made to the text. Little Brown also rejected the book that same month, declining publication due to its excessive length, which meant the book would be prohibitively expensive for a first novel. (Most of the costs of publishing a first novel are the costs of paper and binding, and a long book makes it harder for the publisher to recoup its costs.)

After reading sample chapters of The Town and the City (along with Kerouac's work-in-progress Dr. Sax), Mark Van Doren recommended the novel to Robert Giroux at Harcourt Brace in March 1949. Giroux, like Van Doren and Kerouac, was associated with Columbia. Giroux was impressed with the 1,100-page-long manuscript, which he thought comparable to Wolfe's Look Homeward, Angel in terms of its lyricism and poetry, and offered Kerouac a $1,000 advance against royalties. He did require that the manuscript be cut to reduce production costs.

Cutting and revising The Town and the City under the supervision of Giroux took months, according to Kerouac's friend John Clellon Holmes. Giroux wanted a 500-page novel that could retail for the then-standard $3.50 per copy. After many months, the proofs were ready in November 1949. The publication date was set for February 1950, with a run of 15,000 copies, 10,500 of which were bound. (The additional 4,500 sets of pages were warehoused, should demand require additional copies.) The English publisher Eyre and Spottiswoode bought the UK rights of the book and prepared their own edition for 1950.

Kerouac decided to use the name "John Kerouac" for the book. (Subsequent paperback and hardback editions have used the name "Jack Kerouac" in lieu of John.) Kerouac dedicated the book To Robert Giroux, "Friend and Editor". Giroux told Kerouac that movie producer David O. Selznick was interested in buying the rights to the book.

Publication eventually was pushed back to March 2, 1950. It received good notices from Charles Poore, reviewing the book for The New York Times daily edition, and John Brooks, reviewing it for the Sunday Times Book Review. The book was heavily criticized by reviewers for the New Yorker and the Saturday Review.

The book was not a success, and Kerouac complained in a September 1950 letter to a Worcester, Massachusetts reviewer who had praised the book that it was no longer selling. Kerouac made no more money on The Town and the City, as his royalties did not exceed his advance and a movie sale never materialized.

Giroux subsequently rejected On the Road in 1951, and all other Kerouac novels submitted to him over the years. The 1951 rejection of On the Road effectively ended Kerouac's personal and professional relationship with Giroux, whom he had considered a friend, and his professional relationship with Harcourt Brace. It would be another six years before he was again published professionally, when Viking published On the Road at the urging of Malcolm Cowley.

== Character key ==
Kerouac often based his fictional characters on friends and family.

Because of the objections of my early publishers I was not allowed to use the same personae names in each work.

Real-life person	Character name
Jack Kerouac	Peter Martin
Leo Kerouac	George Martin
Caroline Kerouac	Ruth and Elizabeth Martin
Gabrielle Kerouac	Marguerite Courbet Martin
Gerard Kerouac	Julian Martin
George "G.J." Apostolos	Danny "D.J." Mulverhill
Henry "Scotty" Beaulieu	Scotcho Rouleau
William S. Burroughs	Will Dennison
Joan Vollmer	Mary Dennison
Mary Carney	Mary Gilhooley
Lucien Carr	Kenneth Wood
Billy Chandler	Tommy Campbell
Allen Ginsberg	Leon Levinsky
Herbert Huncke	Junkey
David Kammerer	Waldo Meister
Edie Parker	Judie Smith
Sebastian "Sammy" Sampas	Alex Panos

== Quotations ==
- And what does the rain say at night in a small town, what does the rain have to say? Who walks beneath dripping melancholy branches listening to the rain? Who is there in the rain's million-needled blurring splash, listening to the grave music of the rain at night, September rain, September rain, so dark and soft? Who is there listening to steady level roaring rain all around, brooding and listening and waiting, in the rain-washed, rain-twinkled dark of night? -- Book 2, Chapter 5.
- "Tell you about cockroaches," said Clint with intense enthusiasm, leaning forward with a finger pointed. "Now! The place I live in has a lot of cockroaches, but I don't have trouble with them, understand, I'm on the best terms with them. Tell you how I do this. Some years ago I sat down and thought about the whole matter: I said to myself, cockroaches are human too, just as much as us human beings. Reason for that is this: I've watched them long enough to realize their sense of discretion, their feelings, their emotions, their thoughts, see. But you laugh. You think I'm talking through my hat. You doubt my word. Wait! Wait!"—Book 4, Chapter 5
- There's no doubt about the fact that Mary Dennison is mad, but that's only because she wants to be mad. What she has to say about the world, about everybody falling apart, about everybody clawing aggressively at one another in one grand finale of our glorious culture, about the madness in high places and the insane disorganized stupidity of the people who let themselves be told what to do and what to think by charlatans—all that is true! All the advertising men who dream up unreal bugaboos for people to flee from, like B.O. or if you don't have such-and-such a color to your wash you're an outcast from society. Don't you see it, man? The world's going mad! Therefore, it's quite possible there *must be* some sort of disease that's started. There's only one real conclusion to be drawn. In Mary's words, everybody got the atomic disease, everybody's radioactive. -- "Leon Levinsky" (Allen Ginsberg) about "Mary Dennison" (Joan Vollmer), Book 4, Chapter 3
