= Christopher Felver =

American photographer and filmmaker

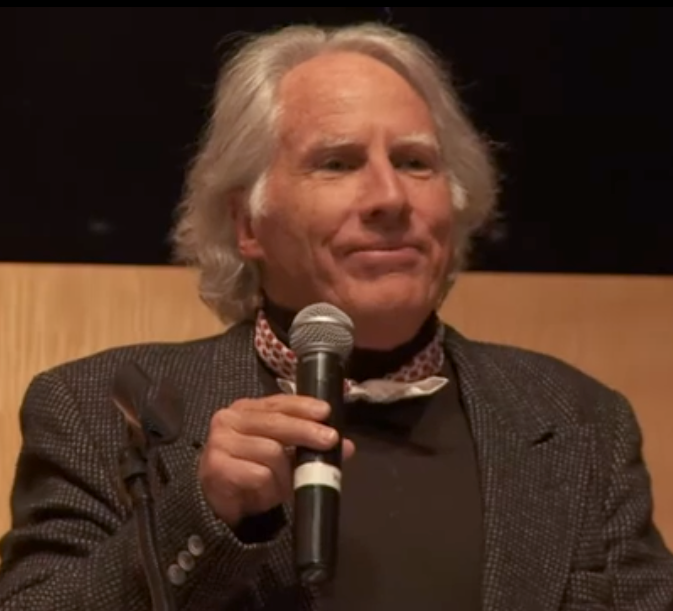
- Speaking at the San Francisco Public Library in 2018
- Born: October 1946 (age 79)
- Occupations: Photographer, filmmaker

Christopher Felver (born October 1946) is an American photographer and filmmaker who has published several books of photos of public figures, especially those in the arts, most notably those associated with beat literature. He has made numerous films (as director, cinematographer or producer), including a documentary on Lawrence Ferlinghetti, Ferlinghetti: A Rebirth of Wonder, released in 2013.

== Photography ==
Christopher Felver has photographed numerous writers, intellectuals and filmmakers such as Charles Bukowski, William Burroughs, Noam Chomsky, Gregory Corso, Clint Eastwood, Lawrence Ferlinghetti, Allen Ginsberg, Dennis Hopper, Oliver Stone, Elizabeth Taylor, Hunter S. Thompson and Kurt Vonnegut.

His photography has been exhibited internationally, with solo photographic exhibitions at the Arco d'Alibert, Rome (1987); the Art Institute for the Permian Basin, Odessa, Texas (1987); Torino Fotografia Biennale Internazionale, Turin, Italy (1989); Centre Georges Pompidou, Paris (1994); Roosevelt Study Center, Middelburg, Netherlands (1998); Fahey/Klein Gallery, Los Angeles (2002); the Maine Photographic Workshop (2002); Robert Berman Gallery, Los Angeles (2007); the San Francisco Public Library (2018) and other galleries and museums.

His works have also appeared in major group exhibitions, including The Beats: Legacy & Celebration, New York University (1994) and Beatific Soul: Jack Kerouac On The Road, New York Public Library (2007).

A collection of his photographs is held by Special Collections, University of Delaware Library, Museums and Press.

== Books ==
Some of Felver's books include American Jukebox: A Photographic Journey (Indiana University Press, 2014), a collection of photographs of musicians and singers including Emmylou Harris, Ozzy Osbourne, Odetta, Taj Mahal, and Eartha Kitt; Beat (Last Gasp, 2007) an intimate memoir of image, text, and reminiscence; The Late Great Allen Ginsberg (Thunder's Mouth Press, 2002); The Importance of Being (Arena Editions, 2001), 400 portraits of eminent figures in American arts, letters, music, and politics; Ferlinghetti Portrait (Gibbs Smith Publisher, 1998); Angels, Anarchists & Gods (Louisiana State University Press, 1996), featuring the American avant-garde; The Poet Exposed (Alfred Van der Marck Editions, 1986), a monograph of contemporary American poets; and Seven Days in Nicaragua Libre (City Lights Books, 1984), co-authored with Lawrence Ferlinghetti, based on a week they spent together in Nicaragua with Minister of Culture Ernesto Cardenal.

His latest book, Tending the Fire: Native Voices and Portraits, a collection of photographs of Native American poets and writers, was published by University of New Mexico Press in April 2017. The book includes an epilogue by Felver, in which he writes, "Native Americans today are as modern as the Space Age, and each in their own way carries forth the cultural heritage 'from whence they came.' Their abiding legacy as the first people of this continent has found its voice in the hard-won wisdom of their art and activism."

== Film ==
Felver directed the 2013 film Ferlinghetti: A Rebirth of Wonder about poet and publisher Lawrence Ferlinghetti, which was reviewed in The New York Times and other publications.

He participated in the 53rd Venice International Film Festival, and screened films in festivals and museums around the globe, including presentations at the Library of Congress (2006), the Pan African Film Festival, Los Angeles (2006), Lincoln Center, New York (2005), the Mill Valley Film Festival (1996, 2002), Santa Fe Film Festival (2001, 2005), Northwest West Film Festival, Portland Art Museum (2001), Walker Museum of Art, Minneapolis (2000), Hirshhorn Museum, Washington D.C. (2000), KQED San Francisco (1984, 1999), and WGBH Boston (1984).

The National Gallery of Art in Washington D.C., New York Public Library, and the Museum of Fine Art in Boston have presented retrospectives of his films: Cecil Taylor: All the Notes (2005), Donald Judd's Marfa Texas (1998), The Coney Island of Lawrence Ferlinghetti (1996), Tony Cragg: In Celebration of Sculpture (1993), John Cage Talks About Cows (1991), Taken by the Romans (1990), West Coast: "Beat & Beyond" (1984), and California Clay in the Rockies (1983).

In 2022, Felver released two documentary films: Spirit of Golf documenting Felver's quest for the "essence of the Auld Scots' game from Pebble Beach to St. Andrews;" and Inside Outside: Anthony Cragg celebrating Sir Tony Cragg's sculpture, illuminating his development and thought-processes over the arc of his career.

== Other ==
Felver appears as a guest lecturer at universities and art centers. From 1987 to 1989, he was a Visiting Artist at the American Academy in Rome.

His work is collected by numerous libraries and museums, including Stanford University Special Collections; Bancroft Library at University of California, Berkeley; The New York Public Library; Donnell Media Center; San Francisco Public Library; University of California Santa Cruz, Special Collections; University of Buffalo, Poetry/ Rare Books Collection; University of North Carolina Special Collections; San Diego State University; University of Delaware Special Collections; UCLA Special Collections; and University of New Mexico Special Collections, and Yale Collection of Western Americana.

== Awards ==
In 1997, Felver received the Best Art Documentary Award at the Cinema Arts Centre International Independent Film Festival, Huntington, New York. In 2018, he was awarded the Gold Medal in the Photography category of the Independent Publisher Book Awards for his book Tending the Fire: Native Voices & Portraits. The same book was also a 2018 finalist (for books published in 2017) in the Photography category of the INDIES Awards of Foreword Reviews.

== Representation ==
His photographs are represented and distributed worldwide by Corbis.
