= Kill Your Darlings (2013 film) =

2013 American biographical drama film directed by John Krokidas

- Theatrical release poster
- Directed by: John Krokidas
- Screenplay by: John Krokidas; Austin Bunn
- Story by: Austin Bunn
- Produced by: Michael Benaroya; Christine Vachon; Rose Ganguzza; Jared Ian Goldman; John Krokidas
- Starring: Daniel Radcliffe; Dane DeHaan; Ben Foster; Michael C. Hall; Jack Huston; Jennifer Jason Leigh; Elizabeth Olsen
- Cinematography: Reed Morano
- Edited by: Brian A. Kates
- Music by: Nico Muhly
- Production companies: Killer Films; Benaroya Pictures; Future Film
- Distributed by: Sony Pictures Classics
- Release dates: January 18, 2013 (Sundance); October 16, 2013 (United States)
- Running time: 104 minutes
- Country: United States
- Language: English
- Budget: $5.6 million
- Box office: $1.8 million

Kill Your Darlings is a 2013 American biographical drama film about the college lives of leading members of the Beat Generation: Lucien Carr, Allen Ginsberg, William S. Burroughs, and Jack Kerouac. Written by Austin Bunn, it is directed by John Krokidas in his feature film directorial debut.

The film had its world premiere at the 2013 Sundance Film Festival, garnering positive first reactions. It was shown at the 2013 Toronto International Film Festival, and it had a limited theatrical North American release from October 16, 2013. Kill Your Darlings became available on Blu-ray and DVD in the US on March 18, 2014, and then in the UK on April 21, 2014.

The title is a reference to the often-misquoted advice of Arthur Quiller-Couch, that writers must be willing to remove their most finely written passages if they fail to serve the piece as a whole: "Murder your darlings."

== Plot ==
In 1944, poet Allen Ginsberg wins a place at Columbia University in New York City. He arrives as a very inexperienced freshman, but soon runs into Lucien Carr, an unruly character who holds strong anti-establishment beliefs.

Ginsberg discovers that Carr only manages to stay at Columbia because of a professor who works as a janitor, David Kammerer; the latter writes all of Carr's term papers for him. Kammerer has a predatory relationship with Carr and is in love with him. Carr describes Kammerer as "a Queer", while Kammerer pressures Carr for sexual favors in exchange for assuring that he cannot be expelled.

As Ginsberg spends more time with Carr, he soon meets William S. Burroughs, who is far into drug experimentation, and the writer Jack Kerouac, who is a sailor at that time and has been expelled from Columbia (and now living with Edie Parker). These ambitious people decide to start a new literary movement named The New Vision as a rebellion toward laws, institutions, and Ginsberg and Carr's law professor Steeves. As Ginsberg spirals into the lifestyle of drugs, alcohol and cigarettes with his newfound friends, he slowly develops romantic feelings for Carr.

The group, consisting of Ginsberg, Carr, Burroughs, and Kerouac, pull off a stunt at the Columbia University library. They manage to take an impression and duplicate the library key, waiting until nightfall to break in. Kammerer tips off the security guards, forcing the group to flee, though they still manage to complete their prank. Afterward, Kammerer confronts the group and is exposed as the snitch.

Carr tells Kammerer he is done with him and recruits Ginsberg to write his term papers. One night, Kammerer tracks down Carr, who is staying with Kerouac at the time. He begs Carr for a chance to redeem himself but is rejected. Kammerer, in retaliation, puts Kerouac's cat into the oven only for Kerouac to discover and rescue it in the middle of the night.

After a while, Kerouac and Carr attempt to join the merchant marine together, hoping to go to Paris. However, Kammerer discovers this through Ginsberg, and arrives at the harbor in time to interrupt the boarding. He then induces Carr to separate from Kerouac and go somewhere else with Kammerer.

That night, when they confront each other at Riverside Park in Manhattan, New York City, an altercation breaks out between them; Kammerer is stabbed to death, and later Carr is arrested. Shortly after, Ginsberg learns of Carr's imprisonment through a phone call with Edie Parker, who also reveals that Kerouac and Burroughs are implicated as accomplices. Ginsberg immediately visits Carr's holding cell, where Carr asks Ginsberg to write his deposition for him. Ginsberg is at first reluctant to help the unstable Carr, but after finding more crucial evidence on Kammerer and his past relationship, he writes a piece titled "The Night in Question". The piece describes a more emotional event, in which Carr kills Kammerer who outright tells him to after being threatened with the knife, devastated by this final rejection. Carr rejects the "fictional" story, and begs a determined Ginsberg not to reveal it to anybody, afraid that it will ruin him in the ensuing trial.

From Carr's mother Marion Carr, it is revealed that Kammerer was the first person to seduce Carr, when he was much younger and lived in Chicago. During the trial, Carr testifies that the attack took place only because Kammerer was a sexual predator, and that Carr killed him in self-defense. Carr is not convicted of murder and receives only a short sentence for manslaughter.

Ginsberg then submits "The Night in Question" as his final term paper. On the basis of that shocking piece of prose, Ginsberg is faced with possible expulsion from Columbia. Either he will be expelled or he must embrace establishment values. He chooses the former, but is forced to leave his typescript behind. A week or two later he receives the typescript in the mail with an encouraging letter from his professor telling him to pursue his writing.

== Cast ==
- Daniel Radcliffe as Allen Ginsberg
- Dane DeHaan as Lucien Carr
- Michael C. Hall as David Kammerer
- Jack Huston as Jack Kerouac
- Ben Foster as William S. Burroughs
- David Cross as Louis Ginsberg
- Jennifer Jason Leigh as Naomi Ginsberg
- Elizabeth Olsen as Edie Parker
- John Cullum as Prof. Harrison Ross Steeves
- Erin Darke as Gwendolyn
- Zach Appelman as Luke Detweiler
- David Rasche as Harry Carman
- Jon DeVries as Mortimer P. Burroughs
- Leslie Meisel as Edith Cohen
- Nicole Signore as Page
- Michael Cavadias as Ray Conklin
- Jonathan Cantor as Ogden Nash
- Kyra Sedgwick as Marion Carr
- Kevyn Settle as Norman

== Release ==
The film earned $1.8 million worldwide.

=== Critical reaction ===
On Rotten Tomatoes the film holds a 77% approval rating, based on 150 reviews with an average rating of 6.7/10. The website's critical consensus reads, "Bolstered by the tremendous chemistry between Daniel Radcliffe and Dane DeHaan, Kill Your Darlings casts a vivid spotlight on an early chapter in the story of the Beat Generation." On Metacritic, the film had an average score of 65 out of 100, based on 36 reviews, indicating "generally favorable" reviews.

The Daily Telegraph granted the film a score of three out of five stars, stating that, "Unlike Walter Salles's recent adaptation of On the Road, which embraced the Beat philosophy with a wide and credulous grin, Kill Your Darlings is inquisitive about the movement's worth, and the genius of its characters is never assumed". Reviewing Kill Your Darlings after its showing at the 2013 Sundance Film Festival, critic Damon Wise of The Guardian lauded the film for being "the real deal, a genuine attempt to source the beginning of America's first true literary counterculture of the 20th century". Kill Your Darlings, wrote Wise, "creates a true sense of energy and passion, for once eschewing the clacking of typewriter keys to show artists actually talking, devising, and ultimately daring each other to create and innovate. And though it begins as a murder-mystery, Kill Your Darlings may be best described as an intellectual moral maze, a story perfectly of its time and yet one that still resonates today." Wise awarded the film four out of five stars. Justin Chang of Variety wrote, "A mysterious Beat Generation footnote is fleshed out with skilled performances, darkly poetic visuals and a vivid rendering of 1940s academia in Kill Your Darlings. Directed with an assured sense of style that pushes against the narrow confines of its admittedly fascinating story, John Krokidas' first feature feels adventurous yet somewhat hemmed-in as it imagines a vortex of jealousy, obsession and murder that engulfed Allen Ginsberg, William S. Burroughs and Jack Kerouac in the early days of their literary revolution."

=== Historical inaccuracies ===
Ginsberg's "long-time confidant and secretary, head of the Allen Ginsberg Trust," Bob Rosenthal, argues that the film is "a superb evocation of young college students in the midst of World War II finding their unique means of expression in the world." However, he states, it also contains a number of inaccuracies: "The large fabrications in the film are not so worrisome as the small ones. In any case, when the truth is stepped on and the nuance of truth is denied, the message becomes moribund." Caleb Carr went on to describe Kammerer as a sexual predator 14 years older than Lucien Carr, who first met Lucien when the latter was pubescent and had repeatedly taken advantage of the younger man's naivete and desperation for a strong male influence after being abandoned by his natural father. Furthermore, Kerouac, who wanted only platonic friendship from Lucien, supposedly provoked the jealousy of Kammerer. In contrast, according to Jack Kerouac's biographer Dennis McNally's account, Lucien Carr had always insisted, which William Burroughs (a childhood friend of Kammerer in St. Louis) believed, that he never had sex with Kammerer.

One can read further on the disputation of Carr's accounts of Kammerer—there are several—in the "Dissenting Opinions" section of the Lucien Carr wiki. The movie offers no glimpse into these conflicting insinuations.

== Accolades ==
Award	Date of ceremony	Category	Recipients	Result
BFI London Film Festival	October 19, 2013	Sutherland Trophy	John Krokidas	Nominated
Chlotrudis Awards	March 16, 2014	Best Actor	Daniel Radcliffe	Nominated
Dorian Awards	March 9, 2014	LGBT Film of the Year		Nominated
Dorian Awards	March 9, 2014	Unsung Film of the Year		Won
GLAAD Media Awards	April 12, 2014	Outstanding Film – Wide Release		Nominated
Gotham Awards	December 2, 2013	Breakthrough Actor	Dane DeHaan	Nominated
Hamptons International Film Festival	October 12, 2013	Breakthrough Performer	Dane DeHaan	Won
Hamptons International Film Festival	October 12, 2013	Breakthrough Performer	Jack Huston	Won
Palm Springs International Film Festival	January 5, 2013	Directors to Watch	John Krokidas	Won
Sundance Film Festival	January 26, 2013	Grand Jury Prize		Nominated
Venice Film Festival	September 7, 2013	The Venice Days International Award		Won

== See also ==
- And the Hippos Were Boiled in Their Tanks, a collaborative novel by Burroughs and Kerouac inspired the events depicted in the film.
