= Joan Vollmer =

Member of the Beat Generation cultural movement

- Vollmer, early 1940s
- Born: February 4, 1923; Loudonville, New York, U.S.
- Died: September 6, 1951 (aged 28); Mexico City, Mexico
- Cause of death: Gunshot wound
- Other names: Joan Vollmer Adams; Joan Vollmer Burroughs
- Education: Doane Stuart School
- Alma mater: Barnard College
- Spouse: William S. Burroughs
- Children: Julie Adams; William S. Burroughs Jr.

Joan Vollmer (February 4, 1923 – September 6, 1951) was an American woman who was an influential participant in the early Beat Generation circle. While a student at Barnard College, she became the roommate of Edie Parker (later married to Jack Kerouac). Their apartment became a gathering place for the Beats during the 1940s, where Vollmer was often at the center of marathon, all-night discussions. In 1946, she began a relationship with William S. Burroughs, later becoming his common-law wife. In 1951, Burroughs killed Vollmer. He claimed, and shortly thereafter denied, the killing was a drunken attempt at playing William Tell.

== Biography ==
Joan Vollmer was born in Ossining, New York, and raised in Loudonville, New York. She graduated from St. Agnes School in 1939 and attended Barnard College in New York City on a scholarship, also studying journalism at Columbia University. Vollmer met Edie Parker at the West End Bar and the two moved in together in the first of a series of apartments in New York's Upper West Side that they shared with the writers, hustlers, alcoholics and drug addicts that later became known as the Beats. These included: William S. Burroughs, Jack Kerouac, Allen Ginsberg, Lucien Carr, Herbert Huncke, Vickie Russell (a prostitute and addict who appears as "Mary" in Burroughs's novel Junkie), and Hal Chase, a Columbia University graduate student from Denver. In The Women of the Beat Generation, Brenda Knight wrote:

Joan Vollmer Adams Burroughs was seminal in the creation of the Beat revolution; indeed the fires that stoked the Beat engine were started with Joan as patron and muse. Her apartment in New York was a nucleus that attracted many of the characters who played a vital role in the formation of the Beat; ... Brilliant and well versed in philosophy and literature, Joan was the whetstone against which the main Beat writers—Allen, Jack, and Bill—sharpened their intellect. Widely considered one of the most perceptive people in the group, her strong mind and independent nature helped bulldoze the Beats toward a new sensibility.

Vollmer married Paul Adams, a law student, in 1944, and had her first child, Julie, in August 1944. In 1945, Vollmer asked Adams, who was in the military at the time, to consent to divorce. Paul Adams divorced Vollmer upon returning from military service, reportedly appalled by her drug use and group of friends. In 1945, Kerouac introduced her to Benzedrine, which she used heavily for a few years. Early in 1946, she began a long-term relationship with Burroughs. The match was initially set up and encouraged by Ginsberg, who much admired Burroughs's intellect and considered Vollmer his female counterpart. Once, Vollmer and Burroughs were arrested for having sex in a parked vehicle.

In 1946, Vollmer was admitted to Bellevue Hospital in New York City due to psychotic episodes as a result of excessive amphetamine use. After being released, she began calling herself Mrs. William Burroughs despite the fact that Vollmer and Burroughs were never formally married. Vollmer and Burroughs had a son, William Burroughs, Jr., in 1947. Due to charges of drug abuse, drug distribution and lewd behavior, they relocated several times, moving first to New Waverly, Texas, then to New Orleans, and eventually to Mexico City. While living in New Orleans, Burroughs was arrested for heroin possession, during which time police searched Vollmer's home, unearthing letters from Ginsberg discussing a possible shipment of marijuana. The resulting criminal charges were grave; if convicted, Burroughs would have served time in Louisiana's infamous Angola State Prison. To avoid prosecution, Burroughs' lawyers negotiated his freedom by supplying the police with the names of his local contacts. He was then allowed to flee to Mexico City. Once he was settled, Vollmer joined him, along with her children.

Vollmer was reportedly unhappy in Mexico City. Benzedrine, her usual drug of choice, was unavailable, and she wrote to Ginsberg that she was "somewhat drunk from 8:00am on... Bill is fine in himself, and so are we jointly. The boys are lovely, easy and cheap (3 pesos = 40 cents) but my patience is infinite." Ted Morgan describes her in Literary Outlaw as a woman suffering from serious drug and alcohol addictions which had aged her noticeably. Her face was swollen; she limped due to a recent bout of polio. Herbert Huncke, who had stayed with the couple in Texas, was struck by Burroughs's indifference to Vollmer, stating that Burroughs "didn't like to be annoyed with her too much". In a 1980s interview with Ted Morgan, Burroughs described a domestic violence incident which occurred shortly after his arrival in Mexico in January 1950, stating that he "slapped" Vollmer after she threw his heroin in the toilet and recalled how he immediately went out to buy more, stating "What could she do? [Go back to Upstate] New York?" The same scene was recounted in Burroughs's semi-autobiographical Junkie.

In August 1950, a petition for divorce was initiated in Mexico by Burroughs, Vollmer, or both. (Although their marriage was a common-law marriage, in Mexico it was considered legal.) However, the application was later withdrawn by their Mexican attorney. The divorce was likely required due to Burroughs's stated desire to take custody of their son upon dissolution.

== Death ==
On September 6, 1951, Burroughs shot Vollmer in the head at a friend's apartment in Mexico City. Burroughs claimed that the killing was a botched party trick, as he had been trying to shoot a glass off of Vollmer's head during a drunken William Tell act. Vollmer died several hours later at the age of 28. Numerous newspapers incorrectly reported her age as 27. Burroughs said he had 8–10 drinks and could not remember much of that night, while witnesses claimed they had two small glasses.

The couple's four-year-old son, William Burroughs Jr., was in the room when the incident occurred, as were the party's host John Healey, and American students Edwin John Woods and Lewis Marker, both residents of the apartment building where the shooting occurred. Burroughs gave different accounts of the shooting, denying his original William Tell story after intervention by his attorney, Bernabé Jurado. Vollmer's parents heard news of their daughter's death from friends while on holiday in Montreal. Her father told the Albany Times Union "I have no reason to believe the shooting was otherwise than accidental."

Burroughs' brother Mortimer arrived from St. Louis to help him, providing thousands of dollars for legal costs to Jurado. Jurado used part of the money to bribe the judge, ballistics experts, and others involved in the case. Burroughs was held on murder charges for 13 days before being released on bail.

Burroughs claimed that he dropped the gun and it misfired, then changed his account again to say that he accidentally misfired the gun while trying to sell the weapon to an acquaintance, an account which was corroborated by two witnesses who had been coached by Jurado. Burroughs testified that he had not known that the gun was loaded because he had not used it in three months, and that while he had been checking the gun, the carriage had slipped and it had misfired at Vollmer. As a result, he was charged with criminal negligence, which carried a maximum sentence of five years.

For a year, Burroughs reported every Monday morning to the jail in Mexico City while Jurado worked to resolve the case. However, Jurado fled to Brazil after shooting a youth who had accidentally damaged his Cadillac. Burroughs decided to follow Jurado's example and fled back to the United States, where he was fortunate that Louisiana had not issued a warrant for his arrest on the previous narcotics charge. In absentia, Burroughs was convicted of manslaughter in Vollmer's death. He received a two-year suspended sentence.

Vollmer was buried in Mexico City, and her parents took her two children back to the United States. Her daughter Julie went to live with her maternal grandparents in Loudonville and assumed the surname Vollmer, while Vollmer's son was raised by her in-laws.

=== Reactions to Vollmer's death ===
Friends of the couple were divided in opinion on the case. Ginsberg and Carr defended Burroughs and believed that Vollmer might have encouraged the William Tell incident, stating she had seemed suicidal when they visited her in 1951. In interviews with Ted Morgan from 1983 to 1986, Burroughs said "Allen was always making it out as a suicide on her part, and I do not accept that cop-out." Haldon Chase, who had also visited Burroughs and Vollmer in 1951 in Mexico City, distanced himself from Burroughs after Vollmer's death. Chase believed that Vollmer "had wanted to die", but that Burroughs' story was "a sham, a put-up thing to release Bill, to let him commit the ultimate crime."

In a 1954 letter to Ginsberg, Burroughs wrote about his fears that he had subconsciously wanted to kill Vollmer: "May yet attempt a story or some account of Joan's death. I think I am afraid. Not exactly to discover unconscious intent, it's more complex, more basic, and more horrible, as if the brain drew the bullet toward it." In the introduction to Queer, Burroughs describes how Vollmer's death exposed him to the risk of possession by a malevolent entity he called "the Ugly Spirit". Later in life, Burroughs described the Ugly Spirit as "Monopolistic, acquisitive evil. Ugly evil. The ugly American", and took part in a shamanic ceremony with the explicit aim of exorcising the Ugly Spirit.

=== In film ===
The film Beat (2000) is a biographical account of the relationship between Vollmer and Burroughs. Vollmer is portrayed by Courtney Love and Burroughs by Kiefer Sutherland. The film centers on Vollmer's death. Her death is also portrayed in the 1991 film Naked Lunch.

== Sources ==
- Ted Morgan, Literary Outlaw, the Life and Times of William S. Burroughs (1988, Henry Holt, ISBN 0-380-70882-5)
- Jack Kerouac, The Vanity of Duluoz (1967–1968, Coward-McCann, ISBN 0-14-023639-2)
- Collins, Ronald & Skover, David, Mania: The Story of the Outraged & Outrageous Lives that Launched a Cultural Revolution (Top-Five Books, March 2013)
