= Beat (2000 film) =

- Directed by: Gary Walkow
- Written by: Gary Walkow
- Produced by: Andrew Pfeffer; Alain Silver; Donald Zuckerman
- Starring: Courtney Love; Kiefer Sutherland; Norman Reedus; Ron Livingston; Kyle Secor
- Cinematography: Ciro Cabello
- Edited by: Craig Devilliers; Peter B. Ellis; Steve Vance; Gary Walkow
- Music by: Ernest Troost
- Production company: Millennium Films
- Distributed by: Lionsgate
- Release dates: January 29, 2000 (Sundance); April 28, 2000 (USA Film Festival); October 22, 2002 (U.S.)
- Running time: 89 minutes
- Country: United States
- Language: English

Beat is a 2000 American biographical drama film written and directed by Gary Walkow, and starring Courtney Love, Kiefer Sutherland, Norman Reedus, and Ron Livingston. The film focuses primarily on the last several weeks of writer Joan Vollmer's life in 1951 Mexico City, leading up to her murder by her husband, the writer William S. Burroughs.

Principal photography of Beat took place on location in Mexico City in the summer of 1999. The film premiered at the Sundance Film Festival in January 2000 and was entered into the 22nd Moscow International Film Festival. Lionsgate released Beat on VHS and DVD on October 22, 2002.

== Plot ==
In 1944 New York City, beat writers and students Allen Ginsberg, Jack Kerouac, Lucien Carr, William S. Burroughs, and David Kammerer all become acquainted with Joan Vollmer, a student at Barnard College. Joan and William carry on a romance. Lucien murders David after David makes unwanted sexual advances on him. Lucien visits Joan and William at their apartment after and Lucien confesses to the murder, claiming David had an obsession with Lucien, and attempted to rape Lucien in a park. Lucien ultimately serves two years in prison for the crime.

By 1951, Joan and William are married and living in Mexico City with their young son, William Jr., and Julie, Joan's daughter from her previous marriage. Joan is unhappy with her life in Mexico, as William carries on an affair with a male lover, Lee, to her chagrin. William leaves to Guatemala to meet Lee for a romantic liaison, avoiding an impending visit from Lucien and Allen who are traveling from New York. Upon Allen and Lucien's arrival, Joan and Lucien visit a local bar together, where Joan expresses her unhappiness over her marriage to William. Joan, Lucien, and Allen plan a weekend trip to visit the Parícutin volcano. Meanwhile, William, having met with Lee in Guatemala, finds Lee evasive and unwilling to be physically affectionate with him. When pressed, Lee suggests he feels that William only uses him for sex.

Joan, Lucien, and Allen travel through rural Mexico en route to Parícutin, camping along the way. Allen tries to convince Joan to return to the United States with him and Lucien, but, despite her unhappiness with her marriage, she does not want to abandon William, as she sees his potential. Joan also adds that William fears returning to the United States due to a pending heroin possession charge there. Sexual tension quickly develops between Joan and Lucien on the trip, but she rejects his numerous advances. The three return to Mexico City from their weekend trip. Lucien and Allen implore Joan to return to New York with them, bringing her children along with, but she refuses.

Willam returns from his trip to Guatemala, and he and Joan discuss the possibility of separating. Lucien and Allen's car breaks down near the Texas border, leaving them stranded. Lucien hitches a ride back to New York City, leaving Allen alone until the car is repaired, as he has to report to his new job at United Press International. Meanwhile, Lee arrives in Mexico City and visits William and Joan at their apartment. After a dinner in which alcohol is consumed, Joan is outwardly passive-aggressive toward Lee. To entertain themselves, William suggests that he and Joan perform their "William Tell" parlor trick, in which he attempts to shoot a shot glass off the top of her head with a pistol. Joan perches a glass atop her head and goads William, who misfires the gun, shooting her in the head and killing her.

Shortly after, while Lucien is working at the United Press International office, he receives a telegram notifying him of Joan's death.

== Cast ==
- Courtney Love as Joan Vollmer
- Kiefer Sutherland as William S. Burroughs
- Norman Reedus as Lucien Carr
- Ron Livingston as Allen Ginsberg
- Daniel Martínez as Jack Kerouac
- Kyle Secor as David Kammerer
- Sam Trammell as Lee
- Lisa Sheridan as Sadie
- Patricia Llaca as Mary
- Georgiana Sîrbu as Julie Adams
- Rene Rubio as William Burroughs, Jr.
- Alec Von Bargen as Heard
- Tommy Perna as Dwight

== Historical accuracy ==
Scholar Michael J. Prince notes that, in the film, "broad liberties are taken with the relationship between Lucien Carr and Joan, and much is imputed to Allen Ginsberg's unrequited love for Carr; lastly, Joan is portrayed as downright vindictive and insulting when chiding her husband about his sexual proclivities." Comparing the film's treatment of Joan to that of David Cronenberg's in Naked Lunch (1991), he concludes: "Even though it ends tragically, [director] Walkow is doing for Joan what Cronenberg has done for William but without the saturation of so much of his own visual character... no one is shown writing more than her in the film... She is bright, alluring, and reflective."

While the film depicts Vollmer leaving her two children behind during her trip to Parícutin with Ginsberg and Carr, in reality, Vollmer brought the children along.

== Production ==
=== Casting ===
Courtney Love's casting as Joan Vollmer was announced in June 1999, at which point Norman Reedus had also been cast as Lucien Carr. Kiefer Sutherland's casting as William S. Burroughs was announced by The Hollywood Reporter in July 1999.

=== Filming ===
Principal photography of Beat took place in Mexico City in the summer of 1999, beginning on July 26. The apartment building which Vollmer and Burroughs are shown residing in the film was located across the street from the actual apartment building the couple shared. Vollmer was killed in a nearby apartment building which also housed a bar, The Bounty, which Burroughs frequented. Walkow had initially sought to shoot in the original apartment, but upon arriving in Mexico City to scout locations, discovered the building had recently been demolished.

=== Post-production ===
Originally, Walkow intended to structure the film chronologically into two separate acts, with the first documenting Vollmer and Burroughs' meeting in 1944 New York City, and the second on their life in 1951 Mexico City. However, he instead decided to present the 1944 backstory in the form of flashbacks, with Ginsberg narrating.

After completing filming, Love commented that "it was a great role," but unfavorably described the film's script as "lousy."

== Release ==
Beat premiered at the Sundance Film Festival on January 29, 2000, and was subsequently entered into the 22nd Moscow International Film Festival. It also screened at the USA Film Festival in Dallas, Texas on April 28, 2000.

=== Home media ===
Lionsgate released Beat on VHS and DVD on October 22, 2002 featuring a shortened cut of the film, running 80 minutes as opposed to the original 89-minute cut shown at the film's Sundance premiere.

== Reception ==
On the review aggregator website Rotten Tomatoes, 57% of seven critics' reviews are positive, with an average rating of 5.3/10.

Christopher Null of Contact Music wrote: "Judy Davis might have commanded the definitive Joan Vollmer role in Naked Lunch, but in Beat, Courtney Love makes a not-half-bad at reinterpreting the last weeks of her life... A loving portrait of the early beat lifestyle, Gary Walkow's ode to Vollmer is sweet and endearing, despite its tragic finale. The four lead players all imbue their characters with substantial flair, especially Sutherland's mannered and deadpan witticisms." Dennis Harvey of Variety gave the film a middling review, deeming the dialogue pretentious and adding: "Modestly mounted feature has adequate production design by Rando Schmook and some pretty Mexican landscape lensing by Ciro Cabello. But staging, pacing, score, et al are uninspired to tedious."

Film Threat wrote: "Generally fine performances help keep the film afloat through several tedious moments of angst-overdose, although Sutherland has a disconcerting tendency to play Burroughs as if channeling Jack Nicholson. Beautiful photography, aided by Mexico’s rugged beauty as natural set dressing, also help. In the end, however, none of these people, except, perhaps, for Ginsberg, come across as particularly likable, at least as written here."

Ron Epstein of the website DVD Talk gave the film an unfavorable review, writing: "It's a shame that Beat is a bad movie. The turns from present to flashback are very stylish, and overall, the acting isn't bad. Hell, even Courtney Love does a pretty good job with what she's been dealt with. Unfortunately, the script doesn't allow for developed relationships between the characters; and feels very hollow when it's all said and done." J. R. Jones of the Chicago Reader criticized the casting of Love in the role of Vollmer, as he felt Love was too glamorous to portray "a plain, brunette bookworm and alcoholic."

== Sources ==
- Prince, Michael J. (2016). Adapting the Beat Poets: Burroughs, Ginsberg, and Kerouac on Screen. New York City, New York: Rowman & Littlefield. ISBN 978-1-442-27325-2.
- Walkow, Gary; Vance, Steve (August 12, 2002). Beat (DVD audio commentary). Lionsgate.
