= West End Bar =

Bar in New York City (1911–2006)

Coordinates: 40.80647°N 73.96533°W

- Interactive map of West End Bar
- Location: Broadway, New York City, New York, United States
- Type: Bar

Construction
- Opened: 1911
- Closed: 2006 (Structure since repurposed by various other businesses)

The West End Bar, also known for a time as the "West End Gate", was located on Broadway near 114th Street in Morningside Heights, Manhattan, New York City. From its establishment in 1911, the bar served as a common gathering place for Columbia University students, faculty and administration (its slogan was "Where Columbia Had Its First Beer"). Amongst the Columbia students who used the bar as a meeting place were Beat Generation writers of the 1940s, and later for student activists of the 1960s.

== History ==
In the early 1940s, in the formative days of the Beat Generation, students including Allen Ginsberg, Jack Kerouac, and Lucien Carr spent hours at the bar discussing their studies and their futures. In the 1960s, the bar was host to student activists upset about racial discrimination in the area and US foreign policy regarding Vietnam. Mark Rudd, who led the Columbia branch of Students for a Democratic Society and was a prominent member of the Weather Underground after his expulsion from the university in 1968, spent time at the bar while a student.

After closing for a year and a half, it was leased from Columbia University by a group led by Jeff Spiegel and his wife Katie Gardner, a graduate of Columbia's School of Journalism. They renovated The West End, making an effort to have it look like it might have looked as an old Victorian era bar/restaurant. They expanded one room for catering, parties and even beer pong, a basement room for live jazz, and a large side dining room that could be used late night, after the kitchen was closed, by drinkers and revelers.

Jazz historian Phil Schaap ran a jazz program at the venue from 1973, when he was an undergraduate at Columbia, to the mid-1990s.

In 2004, The West End began brewing its own beers including its very popular, nearly 10% "Ker O'Whack", named for Columbia dropout and author, Jack Kerouac. The West End in 1990 also became a full-service restaurant, including a widely popular Sunday brunch. It installed flat screen monitors for sports events. Playboy magazine featured The West End as "College Bar of the Month" in its February 2005 issue.

The West End qua West End was sold in April 2006 and was replaced in late 2006 by "Havana Central at the West End", part of the expanding "Havana Central" chain of Cuban restaurants. The Havana Central closed on May 28, 2014, when the lease ended. In September 2014, the space reopened as Bernheim & Schwartz Restaurant and Hall, which was described by its owners as a tribute to brewing in Manhattan, and especially to Bernheim & Schwartz, a brewery founded in 1903 and located at 128th Street and Amsterdam Avenue. Bernheim & Schwartz closed in April 2017. In 2021, the space reopened as Hex & Co., a board game café.
