= Dane DeHaan =

American actor (born 1986)

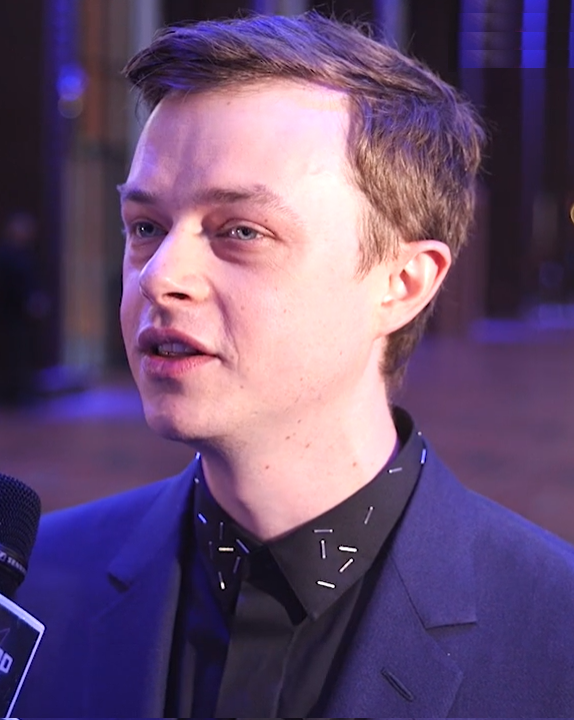
- DeHaan in 2018
- Born: Dane William DeHaan; February 6, 1986 (age 40); Allentown, Pennsylvania, U.S.
- Education: University of North Carolina School of the Arts (BFA)
- Occupation: Actor
- Years active: 2008–present
- Spouse: Anna Wood (m. 2012)
- Children: 2

Dane William DeHaan (/dəˈhɑːn/ də-HAHN; born February 6, 1986) is an American actor. His roles include Andrew Detmer in Chronicle (2012), Jason Glanton in The Place Beyond the Pines (2012), Lucien Carr in Kill Your Darlings (2013), Harry Osborn / Green Goblin in The Amazing Spider-Man 2 (2014), Lockhart in A Cure for Wellness (2016), Valerian in Valerian and the City of a Thousand Planets (2017), Chris Lynwood in ZeroZeroZero, and Kenneth Nichols in Oppenheimer (2023). In 2021, he starred in the psychological romance horror miniseries Lisey's Story. He also had a role in the true crime limited series adaptation of The Staircase in 2022.

== Early life and education ==
DeHaan was born in Allentown, Pennsylvania, on February 6, 1986, to Jeffrey and Cynthia DeHaan. His father is a computer programmer and his mother is an executive at MetLife. He has an older sister, and had what The Independent described in 2017 as a "very normal, super-supportive childhood".

DeHaan attended Emmaus High School in Emmaus, Pennsylvania, for three years and appeared in community theater. He transferred to the University of North Carolina School of the Arts (UNCSA) for his senior year of high school, where he said he was "around artists for the first time". He continued at UNCSA for undergraduate studies, graduating in 2008.

== Career ==
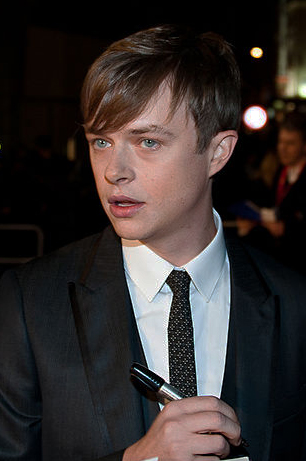
DeHaan at a screening of Kill Your Darlings in October 2013

DeHaan began his professional acting career as an understudy for Haley Joel Osment in the short-lived 2008 Broadway revival of American Buffalo. Also in 2008, he made his television debut, guest-appearing on an episode of Law & Order: Special Victims Unit.

In 2010, DeHaan made his feature film debut in John Sayles's Amigo and played Jesse in the third season of HBO's In Treatment. In 2011, he played Timbo in the fourth season of True Blood. In 2012, DeHaan starred in the sci-fi found footage film Chronicle, and as Cricket in Lawless.

In 2013, he played Lucien Carr, a contemporary of Allen Ginsberg and Jack Kerouac, in Kill Your Darlings. It was a role for which he has received critical acclaim. In 2013, he starred as the main character "Trip" in Metallica's surrealist concert film Metallica: Through the Never. He was the cover star of Hero magazine issue 10 in October 2013, shot by Hedi Slimane.

In 2014, Annie Leibovitz photographed DeHaan for Prada's men's clothing spring advertising campaign. That same year, he played Harry Osborn / Green Goblin in The Amazing Spider-Man 2 and Zach Orfman in Life After Beth. DeHaan played a fictional version of himself in the music video for Imagine Dragons' song "I Bet My Life".

In 2015, DeHaan starred as James Dean in the drama Life, based on Dean's friendship with photographer Dennis Stock. In September 2015, DeHaan was the cover star of Another Man issue 20. In 2016, DeHaan played Roman in the independent drama film Two Lovers and a Bear and Lockhart in the 2016 horror film A Cure for Wellness.

In 2017, DeHaan starred in Luc Besson's science fiction film Valerian and the City of a Thousand Planets based on the French comics series Valérian and Laureline. He also starred in the 17th-century romance Tulip Fever.

In 2019, DeHaan starred as Billy the Kid in Vincent D'Onofrio's The Kid.

From 2019 to 2020, DeHaan starred as Chris Lynwood in the Amazon Prime series ZeroZeroZero, alongside Andrea Riseborough and Gabriel Byrne. He starred in the Quibi mini-series The Stranger in 2020.

In February 2022, DeHaan was cast as Kenneth Nichols in Christopher Nolan’s biographical film Oppenheimer (2023).

== Personal life ==
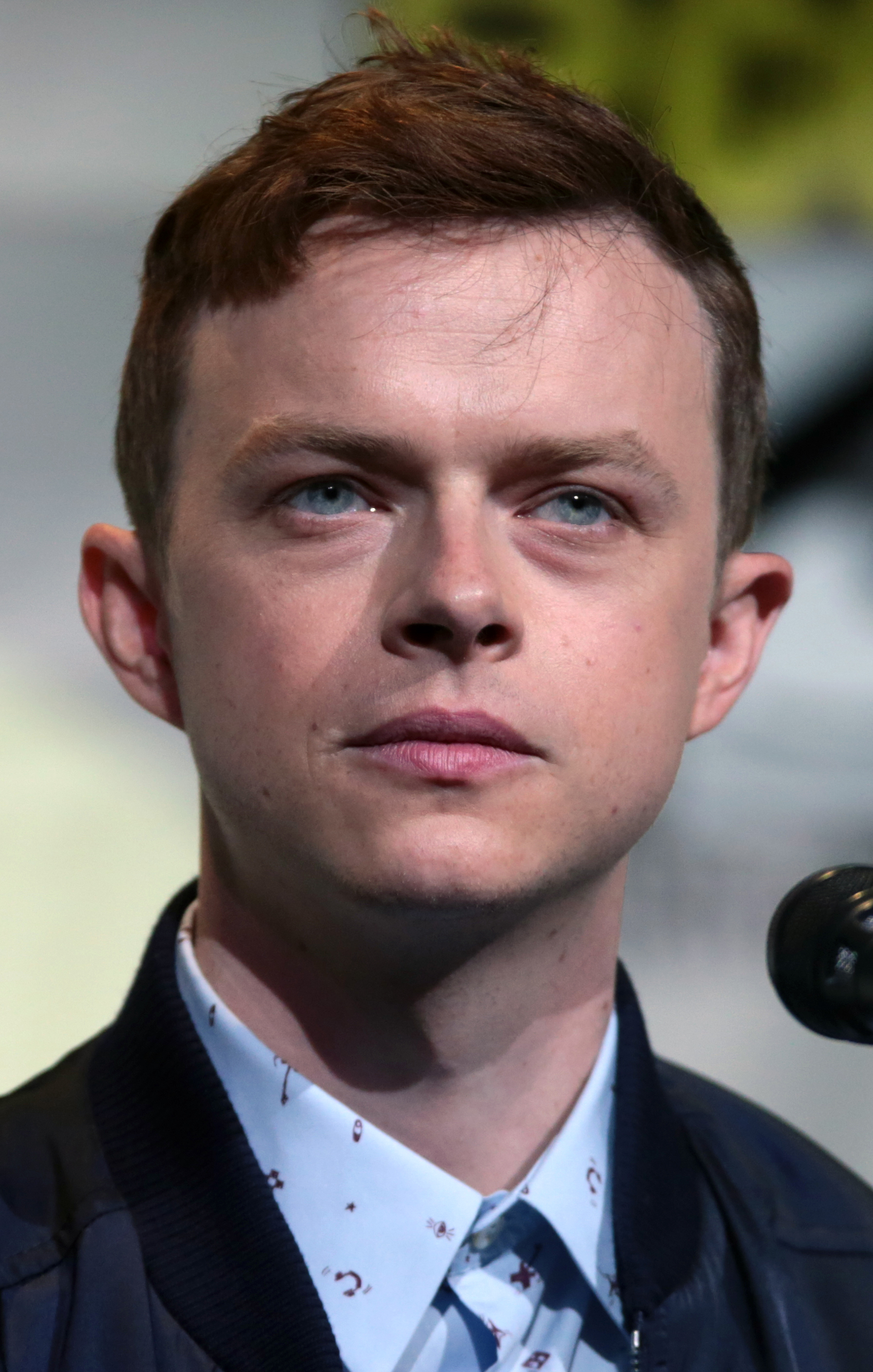
DeHaan in July 2016

DeHaan and American actress Anna Wood began a relationship in 2006, and married in a private ceremony on June 30, 2012. They met at the University of North Carolina School of the Arts in Winston-Salem, North Carolina. They live in Brooklyn in New York City with their two children.

== Filmography ==
=== Film ===
| Year | Title | Role | Notes |
|---|---|---|---|
| 2010 | Amigo | Gil | |
| 2012 | Chronicle | Andrew Detmer | |
| 2012 | Jack & Diane | Chris | |
| 2012 | Lawless | Cricket Pate | |
| 2012 | Lincoln | Second white soldier | |
| 2012 | The Place Beyond the Pines | Jason Glanton | |
| 2013 | Devil's Knot | Chris Morgan | |
| 2013 | Kill Your Darlings | Lucien Carr | |
| 2013 | Metallica: Through the Never | Trip | |
| 2014 | The Amazing Spider-Man 2 | Harry Osborn / Green Goblin | |
| 2014 | Life After Beth | Zach Orfman | |
| 2015 | Knight of Cups | Paul | |
| 2015 | Life | James Dean | |
| 2016 | Leap! | Victor | Voice role |
| 2016 | Two Lovers and a Bear | Roman | |
| 2016 | A Cure for Wellness | Lockhart | |
| 2017 | Tulip Fever | Jan Van Loos | |
| 2017 | Valerian and the City of a Thousand Planets | Valerian | |
| 2018 | The Boxcar Children: Surprise Island | John Joseph Alden | Voice role |
| 2019 | The Kid | Billy the Kid | |
| 2023 | Oppenheimer | Kenneth Nichols | |
| 2023 | Dumb Money | Brad | |
| 2026 | Wardriver | Cole | |
| TBA | The Queen of Fashion † | Detmar Blow | Post-production |
| TBA | Samo Lives † | | Post-production |
| TBA | America’s Favorite † | Peter Bale | Post-production |

=== Television ===
| Year | Title | Role | Notes |
|---|---|---|---|
| 2008 | Law & Order: Special Victims Unit | Vincent Beckwith | Episode: "Lunacy" |
| 2010 | In Treatment | Jesse D'Amato | 7 episodes |
| 2010 | At Risk | Cal Tradd | Television film |
| 2010 | The Front | Cal Tradd | Television film |
| 2011 | True Blood | Timbo | 3 episodes |
| 2020 | ZeroZeroZero | Chris Lynwood | Main role |
| 2020 | The Stranger | Carl E. | Main role |
| 2021 | Lisey's Story | Jim Dooley | Main role |
| 2022 | The Staircase | Clayton Peterson | Main role |
| 2025 | American Primeval | Jacob Pratt | Main role |
| TBA | Neuromancer † | Peter Riviera | Post-production |

=== Music videos ===
| Year | Title | Artist |
|---|---|---|
| 2013 | "Metallica: Through the Never" | Metallica |
| 2014 | "I Bet My Life" | Imagine Dragons |

== Awards and nominations ==
=== Film ===
| Year | Award | Category | Nominated work | Result | Ref. |
|---|---|---|---|---|---|
| 2013 | Hamptons International Film Festival | Breakthrough Performer | Kill Your Darlings | Won | |
| 2013 | Gotham Awards | Breakthrough Actor | Kill Your Darlings | Nominated | |
| 2014 | BAFTA Awards | EE Rising Star Award | — | Nominated | |

=== Theater ===
| Year | Award | Category | Nominated work | Result | Ref. |
|---|---|---|---|---|---|
| 2010 | Obie Award | Obie Award for Performance | The Aliens | Won | |

== Sources ==
- "Dane DeHaan biography". danedehaan.com.
