= Vanity of Duluoz =

1968 semi-autobiographical novel by Jack Kerouac

- First edition
- Author: Jack Kerouac
- Language: English
- Genre: Semi-autobiographical novel
- Publisher: Coward-McCann
- Publication date: 1968
- Publication place: United States
- Media type: Print (hardback & paperback)
- Pages: 272 pp
- ISBN: 0-14-023639-2
- OCLC: 30493294
- Dewey Decimal: 813/.54 20
- LC Class: PS3521.E735 V36 1994
- Preceded by: Satori in Paris (1966)
- Followed by: Pic (1971)

Vanity of Duluoz: An Adventurous Education, 1935–46 is a 1968 semi-autobiographical novel by Jack Kerouac. The book describes the adventures of Kerouac's alter ego, Jack Duluoz, covering the period of his life between 1935 and 1946. The book includes reminiscences of the author's high school experiences in Lowell, Massachusetts, his education at Columbia University, and his subsequent naval service during World War II. It culminates with the beginnings of the Beat movement. It was Kerouac's last work published during his life. The tone of the book has been noted for its stark contrast to On the Road.

== Background ==
When Kerouac wrote Vanity of Duluoz in 1967, he had already been disenchanted and suffered alcoholism for several years, and his literary output had decreased. Typical of his memoir-style writing (but using a more structured grammar style he had abandoned after his first novel, The Town and the City), the book delves into his past in Lowell and New York, and narrates his various travels and other living situations. It revolves around the time of the pre-WWII and war years, and his time in college and the merchant marines, and concludes with his life in the early renaissance of the Beat Generation. However, due to Kerouac's rambling style, the book is frequently laced with comments on his contemporary world, his mid-life musings, and jabberwocky-like wordplay. Through certain portions of the book, he addresses the narration to "wifey".

Towards the end of the book, in Book 13, Kerouac identifies the meaning of his vanity with the words of King Solomon found in Ecclesiastes: "There is nothing new under the sun;" "All is vanity."

== Characters ==
Kerouac often based his fictional characters on friends and family.

"Because of the objections of my early publishers I was not allowed to use the same personae names in each work."

Real-life person	Character name
Neal Cassady	Cody Pomeray
Jack Kerouac	Jack Duluoz
Leo Kerouac	Emil "Pop" Duluoz
Gabrielle Kerouac	Ange
George "G.J." Apostolos	G.J. Rigolopoulos
Aram "Al" Avakian	Chuck Derounian
Henry "Scotty" Beaulieu	Scotcho Boldieu
William S. Burroughs	Will Hubbard
Joan Vollmer	June
Mary Carney	Maggie Cassidy
Lucien Carr	Claude de Maubris
Billy Chandler	Dickie Hampshire
Duke Chiungos	Telemachus Gringas
Margaret "Peggy" Coffey	Pauline "Moe" Cole
Henri Cru	Deni Bleu
Allen Ginsberg	Irwin Garden
David Kammerer	Franz Mueller
Johnny Koumentalis	Johnny Kazarakis
Lou Little	Lu Libble
Charles Morissette	Charley Bissonnette
Robert Morissette	Iddyboy Bissonnette
Jim O'Dea	Timmy Clancy
Edie Parker	Edna "Johnnie" Palmer
Sebastian "Sammy" Sampas	Sabby Savakis
Stella Sampas	Stavroula Savakis
Gary Snyder	Gary Snyder
Seymour Wyse	Lionel Smart
