= And the Hippos Were Boiled in Their Tanks =

1945 novel by Jack Kerouac and William S. Burroughs

- First US edition
- Author: Jack Kerouac & William S. Burroughs
- Language: English
- Genre: Mystery
- Publisher: Grove Press (US); Penguin Classics (UK)
- Publication date: November 1, 2008 (US)
- Publication place: United States
- Media type: Hardcover

And the Hippos Were Boiled in Their Tanks is a novel by Jack Kerouac and William S. Burroughs. It was written in 1945, a full decade before the two authors became famous as leading figures of the Beat Generation, and remained unpublished in complete form until 2008.

== Creation ==
The book consists of alternating chapters by each author writing as a different character. Burroughs (as William Lee, the pseudonym he would later use for his first published book, Junkie) writes the character "Will Dennison" while Kerouac (as "John Kerouac"), takes on the character of "Mike Ryko".

According to the book The Beat Generation in New York by Bill Morgan, the novel was based upon the killing of David Kammerer who was obsessed with Lucien Carr. Carr stabbed Kammerer to death in a drunken fight, in self-defense by some accounts, then dumped Kammerer's body into the Hudson River. Carr later confessed the crime, first to Burroughs, then to Kerouac, neither of whom reported it to the police. When Carr eventually turned himself in, Burroughs and Kerouac were arrested as accessories after the fact. Kerouac served some jail time because his father refused to bail him out, but Burroughs was bailed out by his family. (Kerouac married Edie Parker while in jail, and she then paid his bail.)

== Title ==
The book's title allegedly comes from a news broadcast, heard by Burroughs, about a fire at a circus during which the announcer broke into hysterics on reading the line.

That was [from] a radio broadcast that came over when we were writing the book. There had been a circus fire and I remember this phrase came through on the radio: 'And the hippos were boiled in their tanks!' So we used that as the title.

In a 1967 interview for The Paris Review, Kerouac agreed with the basis of the story but said the fire was at London Zoo.

However, in his afterword to the 2008 publication, James Grauerholz indicated that the origin of the title is unconfirmed and may have been related to a zoo incident in Egypt, or possibly a fire that occurred at a circus.

== Characters ==
Kerouac often based his fictional characters on friends and family.

"Because of the objections of my early publishers I was not allowed to use the same person's name in each work."

Real-life person	Character name
Jack Kerouac	Mike Ryko
William Burroughs	Will Dennison
Lucien Carr	Phillip Tourian
Dave Kammerer	Ramsay Allen, or Al
Edie Parker	Janie
Celine Young	Barbara "Babs" Bennington
John Kingsland	James Cathcart
Russell Carr, father of Lucien Carr	Mr Tourian, or Mr Rogers
Marion Carr, mother of Lucien Carr	Mrs Tourian
Godfrey S. Rockefeller, uncle of Lucien Carr	The uncle of Phillip Tourian
Chandler Brossard	Chris Rivers
Neal Spollen	Hugh Maddox
Ruth Louise McMahon	Agnes O'Rourke
Donna Leonard	Della
Teresa Willard	Bunny
Patricia Goode Harrison	Jane Bole
Thomas F. Healy	Tom Sullivan
"Hoagy" Norman or Norton	Danny Borman
Joe Gould	Joe Gould

== Publication and reception ==
In later years, Burroughs did not consider And the Hippos Were Boiled in Their Tanks worth retrieving from obscurity. In the 1986 documentary What Happened to Kerouac? he dismissed it as "not a distinguished work."

It wasn't sensational enough to make it . . . nor was it well-written or interesting enough to make it [from] a purely literary point of view.

According to James Grauerholz, numerous attempts were made by Kerouac and others to get the book published, until Burroughs brought a lawsuit over the use of quotations from the manuscript that appeared in New York magazine in 1976; the suit, which was settled in the 1980s, established the ownership of the work. When Burroughs died in 1997, Grauerholz became the executor of his estate, with responsibility for the disposition of his unpublished works. He had befriended Lucien Carr and agreed not to publish the manuscript in Carr's lifetime, although an excerpt from the book was included in the 1997 Burroughs omnibus Word Virus, published by Grove after the writer's death (but approved by Burroughs before he died). Carr's death in 2005 made way for the complete book to be published at last.

Penguin Books published the novel in November 2008. An American edition was published by Grove Press.

Ian Pindar, writing for The Guardian, agreed with Burroughs' assessment about the book but said "Neither Burroughs nor Kerouac is at his best here, but Hippos has value as a testament to their latent talent."

The New York Times, in a review panning the novel, called the book "flimsy" "repetitious" and "flat-footed". The review said "The best thing about this collaboration between Jack Kerouac and William S. Burroughs is its gruesomely comic title".

A positive review in The Independent stated that the "novel has limited claims to the literary high ground, but is an enjoyable read".

Although not based upon the novel, the 2013 film release Kill Your Darlings re-creates the events leading up to the murder that inspired the book.
