= Cacoethes =

Cacoethes (Latin: cacoēthes, lit. 'mania; disease') may refer to:

- Cacoethes (horse) (1986–2009), American-bred British-trained race horse
- Cacoethes (moth), a genus of tiger moths, taxonomic synonym for Amata
- Rheinhold Cacoethes, a fictional character in The Dharma Bums by Jack Kerouac, based on Kenneth Rexroth

== See also ==
- Mania, a mental and behavioral disorder
- Cacoethes scribendi (lit. 'insatiable desire to write') at List of Latin phrases (C)
