= Beat Generation =

Literary movement

- Branch: Literature
- Years active: 1945–1960s
- Location: United States
- Major figures: William S. Burroughs; Allen Ginsberg; Jack Kerouac; Neal Cassady; Lawrence Ferlinghetti; Diane di Prima; Gregory Corso; Gary Snyder; Amiri Baraka; Herbert Huncke
- Influences: Surrealism; Romantic poetry; Literary modernism; Black Mountain poets; Experimental literature
- Influenced: Counterculture of the 1960s; Alternative literature; Postmodern literature; Confessional writing; Spoken Word; Performance poetry

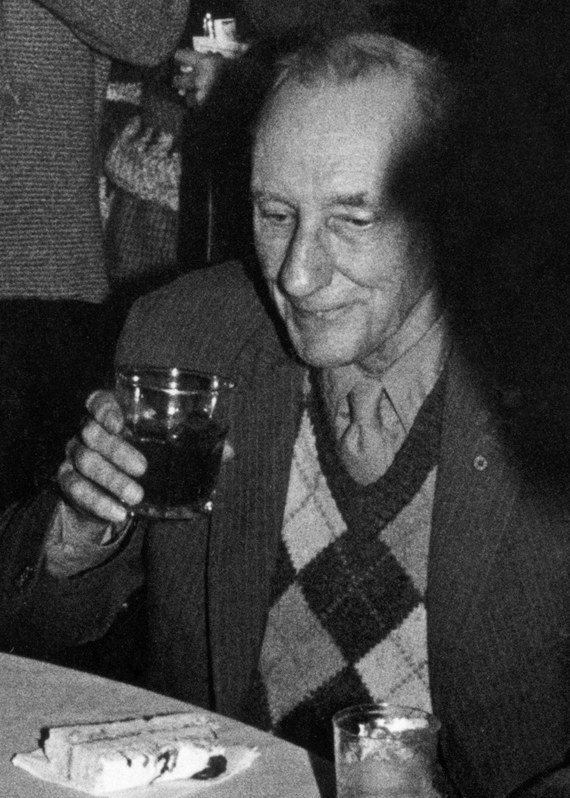
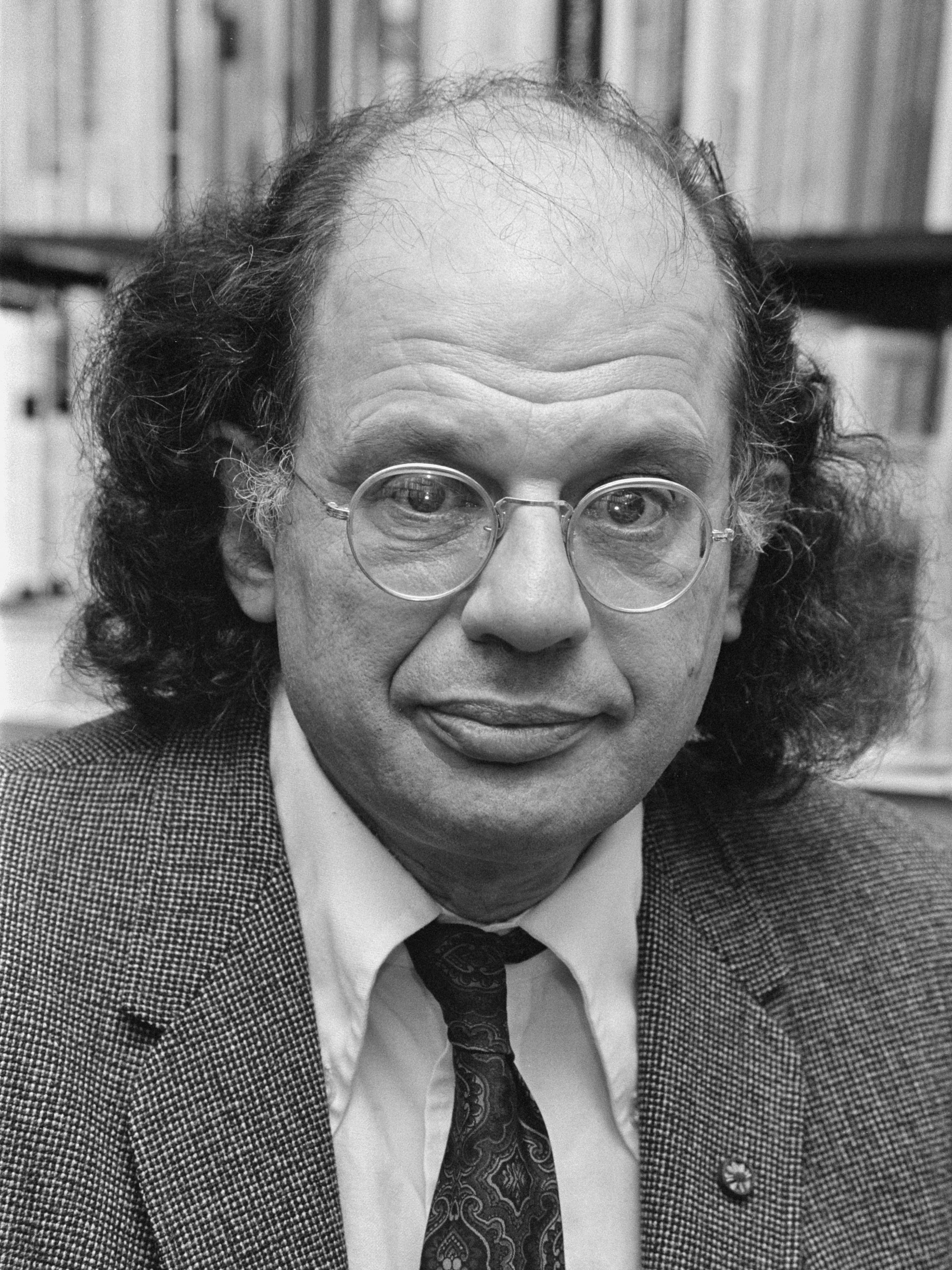
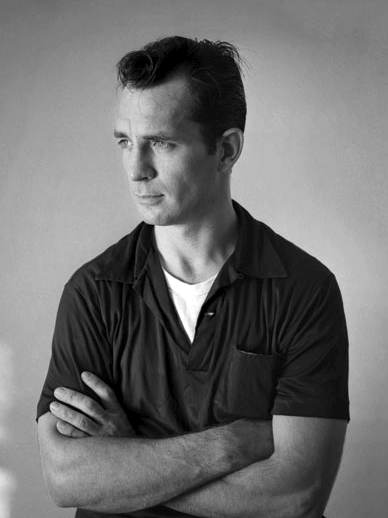
Notable writers of the Beat Generation include (from left): William S. Burroughs, Allen Ginsberg and Jack Kerouac. All were from the previous generation.

The Beat Generation was a literary subculture movement started by a group of authors whose work explored and influenced the American culture and American politics in the post–World War II and Cold War eras. The bulk of their work was published and popularized by members of the Silent Generation in the mid-to-late 1950s, better known as Beatniks. The central elements of Beat culture are the rejection of standard narrative values, making a spiritual quest, the exploration of American and Eastern religions, the rejection of economic materialism, explicit portrayals of the human condition, experimentation with psychedelic drugs, and sexual liberation and exploration.

Allen Ginsberg's Howl (1956), William S. Burroughs' Naked Lunch (1959), and Jack Kerouac's On the Road (1957) are among the best-known examples of Beat literature. Both "Howl" and Naked Lunch were the focus of obscenity trials that ultimately helped to liberalize publishing in the United States. The members of the Beat Generation developed a reputation as new bohemian hedonists, who celebrated non-conformity and spontaneous creativity.

The core group of Beat Generation authors—Herbert Huncke, Ginsberg, Burroughs, Lucien Carr, and Kerouac—met in 1944 on and around Columbia University's campus in New York City. Later, in the mid-1950s, the central figures, except Burroughs and Carr, ended up together in San Francisco, where they met and became friends of figures associated with the San Francisco Renaissance.

In the 1950s, a Beatnik subculture formed around the literary movement, although this was often viewed critically by major authors of the Beat movement. In the 1960s, elements of the expanding Beat movement were incorporated into the hippie and larger counterculture movements. Neal Cassady, as the driver for Ken Kesey's bus Furthur, was the primary bridge between these two generations. Ginsberg's work also became an integral element of 1960s hippie culture, in which he actively participated. The hippie culture was practiced primarily by older members of the following generation, the baby boomers.

== Etymology ==
A conversation in 1948 between Kerouac and writer John Clellon Holmes led to the accidental naming of the 'Beat Generation'. It was in this discussion that Kerouac dismissed Holmes' question around classifying the generation, "not meaning to name the generation—but to unname it". In turn, this characterized a perceived underground, anti-conformist youth movement in New York. The article This Is the Beat Generation was published in 1952 in The New York Times Magazine and while it coined the movement, it also introduced and outlined the term 'beat'. Kerouac credited junkie, hustler, and writer Herbert Huncke with first using the word "beat".

The adjective "beat" could colloquially mean "tired" or "beaten down" within the African-American community of the period and had developed out of the image "beat to his socks", but Kerouac expanded on the meaning to include the connotations "upbeat", "beatific", and the musical association of being "on the beat", and "the Beat to keep" from the Beat Generation poem It was also understood to mean being "emptied out, exhausted" and simultaneously "wide-open and receptive to vision."

== Significant places ==
=== Columbia University ===
The origins of the Beat Generation can be traced to Columbia University and the meeting of Kerouac, Ginsberg, Carr, Hal Chase and others. Kerouac attended Columbia on a football scholarship. Though the beats are usually regarded as anti-academic, many of their ideas were formed in response to professors like Lionel Trilling and Mark Van Doren. Classmates Carr and Ginsberg discussed the need for a "New Vision" (a term borrowed from W. B. Yeats), to counteract what they perceived as their teachers' conservative, formalistic literary ideals.

=== Greenwich Village ===
Bohemian writers and artists flocked to Greenwich Village in New York City in the late 1950s because of low rents and the "small town" character of the scene. People of all kinds congregated in Washington Square Park on weekends for the camaraderie of kindred spirits—there was "painting, poetry, music, dance, and theater" with folk concerts and poetry readings happening spontaneously. Allen Ginsberg was a big part of the scene in the Village, as was Burroughs, who lived at 69 Bedford Street.

Burroughs, Ginsberg, Kerouac, and other poets frequented many bars in the area, including the San Remo Cafe at 93 MacDougal Street on the northwest corner of Bleecker, Chumley's, and Minetta Tavern. Jackson Pollock, Willem de Kooning, Franz Kline, and other abstract expressionists were also frequent visitors of and collaborators with the Beats. Cultural critics have written about the transition of Beat culture in the Village into the Bohemian hippie culture of the 1960s.

In 1960, a presidential election year, the Beats formed a political party, the "Beat Party", and held a mock nominating convention to announce a presidential candidate: the African-American street poet Big Brown won a majority of votes on the first ballot but fell short of the eventual nomination. The Associated Press reported, "Big Brown's" lead startled the convention. "Big", as the husky Negro is called by his friends, wasn't the favorite son of any delegation. But he had one tactic that apparently earned him votes. In a chatterbox convention, only once did he speak at length, and that was to read his poetry."

=== San Francisco and the Six Gallery Reading ===
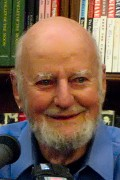
Lawrence Ferlinghetti

Ginsberg had visited Neal and Carolyn Cassady in San Jose, California in 1954 and moved to San Francisco in August. He fell in love with Peter Orlovsky at the end of 1954 and began writing "Howl". Lawrence Ferlinghetti, of the new City Lights Bookstore, started to publish the City Lights Pocket Poets Series in 1955.

Kenneth Rexroth's apartment became a Friday night literary salon (Ginsberg's mentor William Carlos Williams, an old friend of Rexroth, had given him an introductory letter). When asked by Wally Hedrick to organize the Six Gallery reading, Ginsberg wanted Rexroth to serve as master of ceremonies.

Philip Lamantia, Michael McClure, Philip Whalen, Ginsberg and Gary Snyder read on October 7, 1955, before 100 people (including Kerouac, up from Mexico City). Lamantia read poems of his late friend John Hoffman. At his first public reading, Ginsberg performed the just finished first part of "Howl". It was a success and the evening led to many more readings by the now locally famous Six Gallery poets.

It was also a marker of the beginning of the Beat movement since the 1956 publication of "Howl" (City Lights Pocket Poets, no. 4), and its obscenity trial in 1957 brought it to nationwide attention.

The Six Gallery reading informs the second chapter of Kerouac's 1958 novel The Dharma Bums, whose chief protagonist is Japhy Ryder, a character who is based on Gary Snyder. Kerouac was impressed with Snyder and they were close for several years. In the spring of 1955, they lived together in Snyder's cabin in Mill Valley, California. Most Beats were urbanites and they found Snyder almost exotic, with his rural background and wilderness experience, as well as his education in cultural anthropology and Oriental languages. Lawrence Ferlinghetti called him "the Thoreau of the Beat Generation."

As documented in the conclusion of The Dharma Bums, Snyder moved to Japan in 1955, in large measure to intensively practice and study Zen Buddhism. He spent most of the next 10 years there. Buddhism is one of the primary subjects of The Dharma Bums, and the book undoubtedly helped to popularize Buddhism in the West and remains one of Kerouac's widely read books.

=== Pacific Northwest and the West Coast ===
The Beats also spent time in the Northern Pacific Northwest including Washington and Oregon. Kerouac wrote about sojourns to Washington's North Cascades in The Dharma Bums and On the Road.[32] Reed College in Portland, Oregon was also a locale for some of the Beat poets with Gary Snyder studying anthropology, Philip Whalen studying courses in "creative writing, graphic arts, language, and literature." and Ginsberg held multiple readings on the campus around 1955 and 1956. Snyder and Whalen were students in Reed's calligraphy class taught by Lloyd J. Reynolds.

The West Coast, specifically San Francisco, is often associated with significant inspiration and contribution to the Beat movement and avant-garde, particularly concerning the visual arts. A culture was cultivated through artists, poets, filmmakers, and jazz affiliations with those in the West Coast, such as Wallace Berman and Robert Alexander's connection with Charlie Parker in the Los Angeles recording studio in 1946. Berman was a core figure among the West Coast with an compelling presence and ability which provided numerous "places to gather, connections, esoteric information, and encouragement" In 1955 he began his assemblage publication Seminar which featured a variety of art, media, poetry formats and alongside other poets, additionally featured sections from Burrough's Naked Lunch.

A center ground for the movement derived from the California School of Fine Arts (now the San Francisco Art Institute) as the "postwar period opened up rich, diverse, and unlikely possibilities to its students." The exploration and experimentation it fostered encouraged methods such as collage, abstract expressionism and photography to break historic artistic barriers. This resulted in a mass expression of the political and cultural climate of the forties and fifties postwar period. Jess Collins is a primary example of this phenomenon, as after he gave up his chemistry career (due to the threat of nuclear war), he enrolled in the California School of Fine Arts in 1949 and concentrated on expression through collage. Wally Hedrick, a Korean war veteran, enrolled in 1952 and specifically used black paintings to oppose war, as well as creating "strong iconic images".

The artistic community of the US West Coast absorbed ideas of the Abstract expressionism movement that were infused into Beat culture as old methods were challenged or completely disregarded. New forms of poetry, photography, art, or literature arose and mutually influenced each other, whether the individual artists were in direct communication or never formally introduced. The "street-level realism" writing of the Beats "was a harbinger of new emerging forms in the visual arts, namely junk sculpture, assemblage and Happenings". Jackson Pollock's action painting was the source of many Beats' inspiration, so much so that poet and playwright Michael McClure advised Pollock's work "was integral to his own life and thought".

== Significant Figures and Events ==
External videos
- Discussion of biographies of Beat poets Jack Kerouac, Lawrence Ferlinghetti, Bob Kaufman, and others, October 22, 1996, C-SPAN

=== David Kammerer's Death ===
Burroughs was introduced to the group by David Kammerer. Lucien Carr had befriended Ginsberg and introduced him to Kammerer and Burroughs. Carr also knew Kerouac's girlfriend Edie Parker, through whom Burroughs met Kerouac in 1944.

On August 14, 1944 Carr killed Kammerer with a Boy Scout knife in Riverside Park in what he claimed later was self-defense He dumped the body in the Hudson River, later seeking advice from Burroughs, who suggested he turn himself in. He then went to Kerouac, who helped him dispose of the weapon Carr turned himself in the following morning and later pleaded guilty to manslaughter. Kerouac was charged as an accessory, and Burroughs as a material witness, but neither were prosecuted. Carr was released in 1946

Kerouac wrote about this incident twice in his works in his first novel The Town and the City and in his last novel Vanity of Duluoz. Burroughs co-wrote And the Hippos Were Boiled in Their Tanks, concerning the murder According to Jonah Raskin, "Everyone in the know conspired to keep Carr's bisexuality a secret" in order to avoid any excessive or prejudice prosecutions of homosexuality. Ginsberg wrote to his brother, Eugene indicating and emphasising the success of their plan

=== Ginsberg's Arrest ===
Ginsberg was arrested on April 22, 1949 following a Police chase and having stolen goods of Herbert Huncke, Little Jack Melody (Jack Melodia) and Vickie Russell (Priscella Arminger) in his apartment The Police attempted to stop Melody who was driving without a licence in Queens with Russell and Ginsberg (who had joined the journey with the objective of taking his "journals and his love letters to other men" to his brother Eugene after Kerouac refused) with the intention of moving the stolen goods.

Melody crashed the car and though Ginsberg had broken his glasses, he managed to escape but left the incriminating journals and letters behind Friends, family, Lionel Trilling, Mark Van Doren, and Jacques Barzun came together and it was put forward that a psychiatric hospital was the best course of action given Ginsberg's persistent use of heroin and marijuana. He was committed for eight months to the New York State Psychiatric Institute, where he met Carl Solomon.

Solomon was arguably more eccentric than psychotic. A fan of Antonin Artaud, he indulged in self-consciously "crazy" behavior, such as throwing potato salad at a college lecturer on Dadaism. Solomon was given shock treatments at the New York State Psychiatric Institute; this became one of the main themes of Ginsberg's "Howl", which was dedicated to Solomon. Though Solomon later clarified he was acting in favor of Dadaism and also denied shock treatments. Solomon agreed to publish Burroughs' first novel, Junkie, in 1953.

=== Joan Vollmer's Death ===
On Thursday 6th September 1951 Joan Vollmer (then Burroughs) was shot in the head by Burroughs after she was prompted by Burroughs to put a glass on her head. There were two additional witnesses, and though the exact details around the incident have differed in Burroughs's recollection, he had attended John Healy's apartment with the intention of selling the gun. He was released on bail thirteen days later then charged with imprudencia criminal (criminal negligence), being once more released on bail, but for a year, until he fled Mexico.

Vollmer had a significant presence among the Beats' circle through her literary knowledge and providing her apartment as "a literary salon of sorts" Burroughs described the death of Vollmer as the reason he became a writer, explaining if not for this incident, he would have not felt "a constant need to escape from possession, from Control" and advised he "had no choice except to write my way out."

== Participants ==
=== Women ===
Although many of the most well-known members of the Beat Generation were men, the women of the Beat Generation,sometimes known as the 'beat chicks') were a crucial part of this movement "because of their marginalized position within society, these writers provide Beat thinking on the moment with a social valance unavailable to their more recognized colleagues." Beat Generation women who have been published include Edie Parker; Joyce Johnson; Carolyn Cassady; Hettie Jones; Joanne Kyger; Harriet Sohmers Zwerling; Diane DiPrima; Bonnie Bremser; Lenore Kandel; Elise Cowen; and ruth weiss, who also made films. Carolyn Cassady wrote an account of life with her husband Neal Cassady titled Off the Road; it was published in 1990 and included details about the affair she carried on with Jack Kerouac at Neal's urging. In 2008, she gave an interview to the literary magazine, Notes from the Underground, in which she said, "As far as I'm concerned, the Beat Generation was something made up by the media and Allen Ginsberg."

Poet Elise Cowen took her own life in 1962. Poet Anne Waldman was less influenced by the Beats than by Allen Ginsberg's later turn to Buddhism. Later, female poets emerged who claimed to be strongly influenced by the Beats, including Janine Pommy Vega in the 1960s, Patti Smith in the 1970s, and Hedwig Gorski in the 1980s.

=== Misogyny in The Beat Generation ===
"For decades, women writers associated with the Beat Generation have been an ignored presence." Societal expectations of the time period (1940s-1960s) seeped into this literary movement; "relegated to the home, women were effectively immobilized. Along with this stifling spacial mobility came a concomitant stifling of temporal freedom." The Beat Generation was considered an all 'boys club', women were still seen as submissive and therefore were overshadowed by the respected and established male Beat writers. Expectations of 'the housewife' and the notion that "domesticity is a personal service," allowed woman's voices within this movement to be overlooked. Catharine R. Stimpson argues that Male Beat writers "wanted women to be one of two things: agents of Aphrodite, to shell out in bed, to wave happily from the froth of orgies or agents of The Great Mother, be she a mother or a nurturing wife", reminiscent of the Madonna-whore complex, fetishizing and making a caricature out of womanhood. Similar to any literary canon, this movement was highly saturated by male writers and "what was ultimately at stake in discussions of domesticity was who got to define women's roles during the period."

=== African-Americans ===
Although African-Americans were not widely represented in the Beat Generation, the presence of black writers, poets and musicians contributed significantly to the movement's progression. African-Americans "represented a contradictory, double-sided America as yet unveiled, presenting an authenticity as real as American inequality itself", and were 10% of American population in 1950.

Though issues of race and sexuality were discussed by Beats, they were mostly spoken from a white perspective. However, core African-American figures in the Beat generation including: Bob Kaufman, LeRoi Jones (Amiri Baraka), Ted Joans, Charlie Parker and Alene Lee challenged this, bringing attention to black culture through music, language and art African-American vernacular rejected historic and current oppression, providing "a cultural cohesion within the Beat counterculture and the avant-garde".

Alongside Joans' publication of Beat Poems 1957, he began performing poetry from 1958 in coffeehouses and he and Fred W. McDarrah formed Rent-A-Beatnik, whereby Joans typically arrived as the 'renter' and performed poetry As with many Beats jazz acted a tool which inspired and generated Kaufman's writing and technique. Although he was a former labour activist he continued to remain political with works such as The Golden Sardine addressing the conviction of Caryl Chessman In 1959 he was the co-founder among Ginsberg, John Kelly and William Margolis of the literary journal Beatitude of which Ginsberg advised Kaufman was "the driving force"

Writer LeRoi Jones married Hettie Jones (formerly Cohen) in 1958 and the two co-founded the poetry and literary magazine Yūgen and Totem Press He ran The Floating Bear with Diane di Prima (of which one issue had them arrested for obscenity). Along with producing his own works, he participated in the Umbra Workshop 1962 founded by black writers, Tom Dent, Calvin Henton and David Henderson, and edited the essential anthology The Moderns 1963 which consisted of mostly Beat writers Following the assassination of Malcolm X in 1965, he departed from the Beats and divorced Cohen to focus on Black nationalism and founded the Black Arts Repertory Theatre in Harlem

== Culture and Influences ==
=== Sexuality ===
One of the key beliefs and practices of the Beat Generation was free love and sexual liberation, which strayed from the Christian ideals of American culture at the time. Some Beat writers were openly gay or bisexual, including two of the most prominent (Ginsberg and Burroughs).

Female Beat writers such as di Prima, Johnson, Lenore Kandel, and Vega approached sexuality differently from the male writers of this movement. They challenged "masculine notions of orgasmic transcendence" and offered their own versions of sexuality. At the time of this movement, "it was no longer acceptable for a wife to shut her husband out of the bedroom. Starting in the 1950's sex was viewed as a key component of a healthy marriage." Women's sexuality was widely linked to bearing children, therefore it was seen as a woman's duty rather than something from which she could derive pleasure.

=== Drug use ===
The original members of the Beat Generation used several different drugs, including alcohol, marijuana, benzedrine, morphine, and later psychedelic drugs such as peyote, ayahuasca, and LSD. They often approached drugs experimentally, initially being unfamiliar with their effects. Their drug use was broadly inspired by intellectual interest, and many Beat writers thought that their drug experiences enhanced creativity, insight, or productivity. The use of drugs was a key influence on many of the social events of the time that were personal to the Beat generation.

=== Women's Influence on The Beat Generation ===
Many women are responsible for the documentation and distribution of works from the Beat Generation. The women surrounding Beat writer Bob Kaufman were partially responsible for his work being as well known as it is today. Kaufman's sister Marion was considered the family historian, and Kaufman's wife (1958–1986) Eileen Kaufman aided him in writing out his poetry and organizing it into the book Solitudes Crowded with Loneliness. She also helped to found and edit Beatitude with Bob Kaufman. Another prominent Beat woman Diane di Prima was responsible for establishing and running Poets Press, which published her own works and the works of other Beat writers (but not exclusively Beat literature).

=== Politics and Media ===
The increasing threat of communism, specifically in the 1950's era of McCarthyism and the terror of a 'Red Scare' led to the Beat generation facing more backlash and hatred from main spread media and the political landscape. Targeting this area of counterculture and fearmongering the public against individuals who did not conform to the society's ideal behaviour was the governments' way to get tensions of themselves and divert the public's attention.

The US government viewed The Beats as a threat because they contradicted principles that the government stood for during an era of political uncertainty and unrest. "They sought to make spontaneity and deliberate defenselessness supreme virtues at a time when over-militarization and its concomitant creed of preparedness first became U.S. foreign and domestic policy". The Beats strongly opposed the US military and the increase in national militarism—their non-conformity to the traditional American way of life was unsettling to complacent citizens. The image of the military was at the forefront of what America stood for and the power it held, especially when faced with an aggressive Soviet Union and the imminent threat presented by the Cold War.

It was much easier for the government to label a group of people not conforming to their socially acceptable ideologies than address the real issues in the country like the reprecussions of The Great Depression, the civil rights movement, the continuation of segregation laws, and discrimination.

The extent of this unsettlement became objectively apparent when J. Edgar Hoover, the former director of the Federal Bureau of Investigation of the US, "declared the "Beatniks" a threat to national security in 1961". This emphasizes the large-scale influence and momentum that was being carried by The Beats in this moment.

Kerouac shared Ginsberg sentiment criticising the government for being 'an ever-more sinister police state run by FBI and blinded by "cowardice hysteria... piling up arms and pathological propaganda" This idea of censorship and surveillance as well as the military use in the States were some of the main areas to inspire The Beats Generation rebellion against the mainstream society.

=== Hedonism ===
Hedonism is defined as the concept of "living and behaving in ways that mean you get as much pleasure out of life as possible, according to the belief that the most important thing you can do in life is enjoy yourself".

According to Petrus, "it is clear today that the authors of most of the pieces misrepresented their subjects, exaggerated stereotypes, took quotations out of context, and cleverly used illustrations for a desired effect". He says Kerouac "objected vehemently to the violent depiction of the hipster". He separated "the Beat Generation, on a spiritual quest, from juvenile delinquents, who, in fact, were sinful and indifferent".

"Holmes argued that spirituality existed in this generation despite the growing presence of juvenile delinquency, social irresponsibility, and apathy in communal activity and orthodox religion". This notion of belief in something higher than themselves (a divine intervention), and acceptance of spirituality contradicted the fundamental structure of hedonism and the unlimited freedom it offered. The relationship between hedonism and The Beats is complicated mixed with exaggerated media tales and a loss of what the members believed in.

=== Romanticism ===
Gregory Corso considered English Romantic poet Percy Bysshe Shelley a hero, and he was buried at the foot of Shelley's grave in the Protestant Cemetery, Rome. Ginsberg mentions Shelley's poem Adonais at the beginning of his poem Kaddish, and cites it as a major influence on the composition of one of his important poems. Michael McClure compared Ginsberg's Howl to Shelley's breakthrough poem Queen Mab.

Ginsberg's main Romantic influence was William Blake, and he studied him throughout his life. Blake was the subject of Ginsberg's self-defining auditory hallucination and revelation in 1948. Romantic poet John Keats also was cited as an influence.

=== Jazz ===
Writers of the Beat Generation were heavily influenced by jazz artists like Billie Holiday and the stories told through the music. Writers like Jack Kerouac (On the Road), Bob Kaufman ("Round About Midnight," "Jazz Chick," and "O-Jazz-O"), and Frank O'Hara ("The Day Lady Died") incorporated the emotions they felt toward jazz. They used their pieces to discuss feelings, people, and objects they associate with jazz music, as well as life experiences that reminded them of this style of music. Kaufman's pieces listed above "were intended to be freely improvisational when read with Jazz accompaniment" (Charters 327). He and other writers found inspiration in this genre and allowed it to help fuel the Beat movement.

=== Early American Sources ===
The Beats were inspired by early American figures in the transcendentalist movement, such as Henry David Thoreau, Ralph Waldo Emerson, Herman Melville and especially Walt Whitman, who is addressed as the subject of one of Ginsberg's most famous poems, "A Supermarket in California". Edgar Allan Poe was occasionally acknowledged, and Ginsberg saw Emily Dickinson as having an influence on Beat poetry. The 1926 novel You Can't Win by outlaw author Jack Black was cited as having a strong influence on Burroughs.

=== French Surrealism ===
In many ways, surrealism was still considered a vital movement in the 1950s. Carl Solomon introduced the work of French author Antonin Artaud to Ginsberg, and André Breton's poem "L'Union libre" influenced the structure of Ginsberg's poem "Kaddish", an elegy for his mother. Rexroth, Ferlinghetti, John Ashbery and Ron Padgett translated French poetry. Second-generation Beat Ted Joans was named "the only Afro-American Surrealist" by Breton.

Philip Lamantia introduced Surrealist poetry to the original Beats. The poetry of Gregory Corso and Bob Kaufman shows the influence of Surrealist poetry with its dream-like images and its random juxtaposition of dissociated images, and this influence can also be seen in more subtle ways in Ginsberg's poetry. According to Barry Miles, when Ginsberg and Corso attended a Surrealist party in Paris near the Trocadero, Ginsberg got on his knees and began kissing Marcel Duchamp's knees, while Corso cut Duchamp's tie with a pair of kitchen scissors. Other French poets influential for the Beats were Guillaume Apollinaire, Arthur Rimbaud and André Gide.

=== Modernism ===
Gertrude Stein was the subject of a book-length study by Lew Welch. Admitted influences for Kerouac include Marcel Proust, Ernest Hemingway and Thomas Wolfe.

=== Buddhism and Daoism ===
Gary Snyder defined wild as "whose order has grown from within and is maintained by the force of consensus and custom rather than explicit legislation." "The wild is not brute savagery, but a healthy balance, a self-regulating system." Snyder attributed wild to Buddhism and Daoism, the interests of some Beats. "Snyder's synthesis uses Buddhist thought to encourage American social activism, relying on both the concept of impermanence and the classically American imperative toward freedom."

== Beat Influence ==
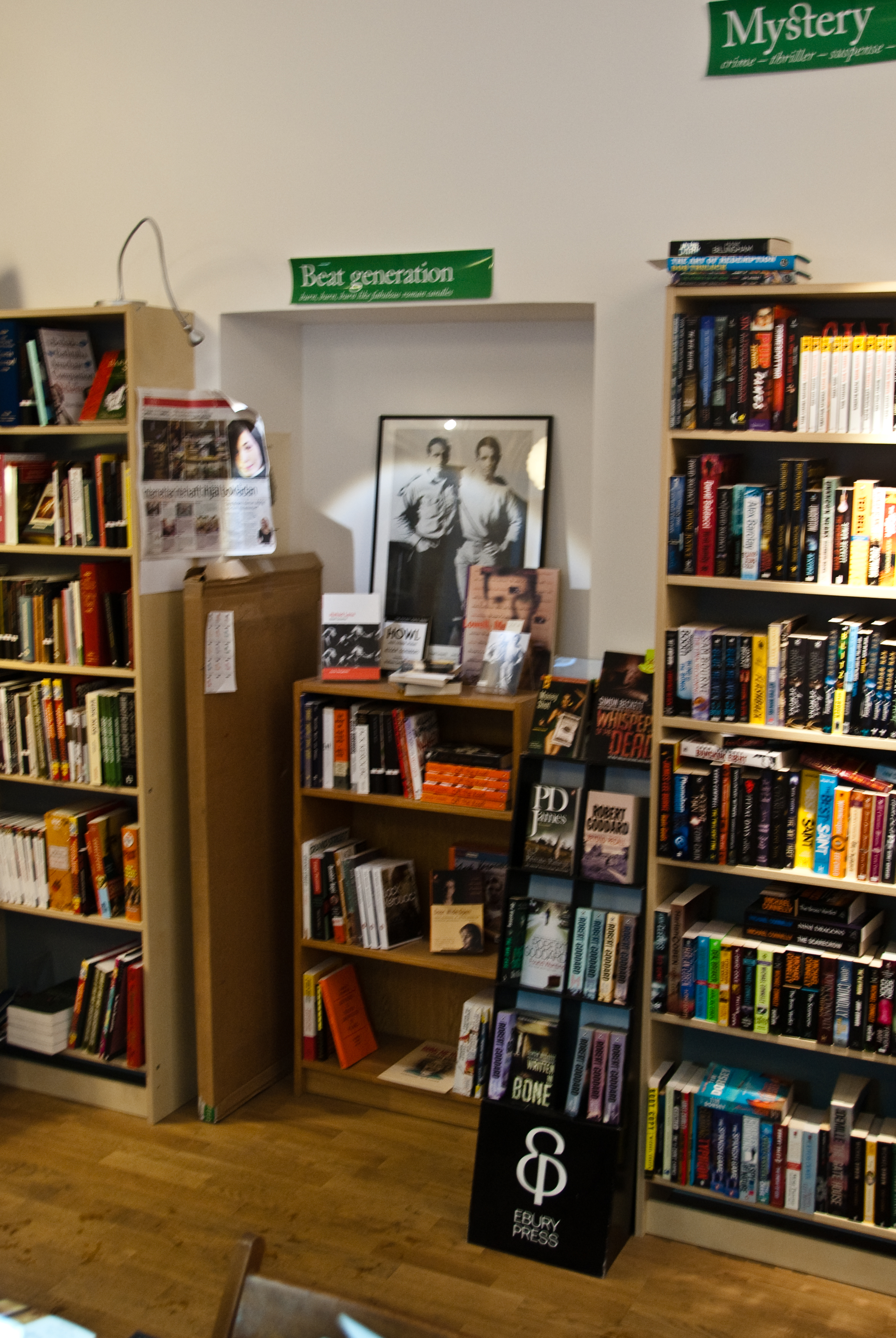
A section devoted to the beat generation at a bookstore in Stockholm

While many authors claim to be directly influenced by the Beats, the Beat Generation phenomenon has had an influence on American culture leading more broadly to the hippie movements of the 1960s.

In 1982, Ginsberg published a summary of "the essential effects" of the Beat Generation:

- Spiritual liberation, sexual "revolution" or "liberation," i.e., gay liberation, somewhat catalyzing women's liberation, black liberation, and Gray Panthers activism.
- Liberation of the world from censorship.
- Demystification and/or decriminalization of cannabis and other drugs.
- The evolution of rhythm and blues into rock and roll as a high art form, as evidenced by the Beatles, Bob Dylan, Janis Joplin, and other popular musicians influenced in the later fifties and sixties by Beat generation poets and writers' works.
- The spread of ecological consciousness, emphasized early by Gary Snyder, Jack Loeffler, and Michael McClure, the notion of a "Fresh Planet."
- Opposition to the military-industrial machine civilization, as emphasized in the writings of Burroughs, Huncke, Ginsberg, and Kerouac.
- Attention to what Kerouac called (after Spengler) a "second religiousness" developing within an advanced civilization.
- Return to an appreciation of idiosyncrasy vs. state regimentation.
- Respect for land and indigenous peoples and creatures, as proclaimed by Kerouac in his slogan from On the Road: "The Earth is an Indian thing."

=== "Beatniks" ===
The term "beatnik" was coined by Herb Caen of the San Francisco Chronicle on April 2, 1958, blending the name of the recent Russian satellite Sputnik and Beat Generation. This suggested that beatniks were (1) "far out of the mainstream of society" and (2) "possibly pro-Communist." Caen's term stuck and became the popular label associated with a new stereotype—the man with a goatee and beret reciting nonsensical poetry and playing bongo drums while free-spirited women wearing black leotards dance.

An early example of the "beatnik stereotype" occurred in Vesuvio's (a bar in North Beach, San Francisco) which employed the artist Wally Hedrick to sit in the window dressed in full beard, turtleneck, and sandals, creating improvisational drawings and paintings. By 1958 tourists who came to San Francisco could take bus tours to view the North Beach Beat scene, prophetically anticipating similar tours of the Haight-Ashbury district 10 years later.

A variety of other small businesses also sprang up exploiting (and/or satirizing) the new craze. In 1959, Fred McDarrah started a "Rent-a-Beatnik" service in New York, taking out ads in The Village Voice and sending Ted Joans and friends out on calls to read poetry.

"Beatniks" appeared in many cartoons, movies, and TV shows of the time, perhaps the most famous being the character Maynard G. Krebs in The Many Loves of Dobie Gillis (1959–1963).

While some of the original Beats embraced the beatniks, or at least found the parodies humorous (Ginsberg, for example, appreciated the parody in the comic strip Pogo) others criticized the beatniks as inauthentic poseurs. Jack Kerouac feared that the spiritual aspect of his message had been lost and that many were using the Beat Generation as an excuse to be senselessly wild.

=== "Hippies" ===
During the 1960s, aspects of the Beat movement metamorphosed into the counterculture of the 1960s, accompanied by a shift in terminology from "beatnik" to "hippie". Many of the original Beats remained active participants, notably Allen Ginsberg, who became a fixture of the anti-war movement. Notably, however, Jack Kerouac broke with Ginsberg and criticized the 1960s politically radical protest movements as an excuse to be "spiteful".

There were stylistic differences between beatniks and hippies—somber colors, dark sunglasses, and goatees gave way to colorful psychedelic clothing and long hair. The Beats were known for "playing it cool" (keeping a low profile).

Beyond style, there were changes in substance. The Beats tended to be essentially apolitical, but the hippies became actively engaged with the civil rights movement and the anti-war movement.

=== Literary Legacy ===
Among the emerging novelists of the 1960s and 1970s, a few were closely connected with Beat writers, most notably Ken Kesey (One Flew Over the Cuckoo's Nest). Though they had no direct connection, other writers considered the Beats to be a major influence, including Thomas Pynchon (Gravity's Rainbow) and Tom Robbins (Even Cowgirls Get the Blues).

William S. Burroughs is considered a forefather of postmodern literature; he also inspired the cyberpunk genre.

One-time Beat writer LeRoi Jones/Amiri Baraka helped initiate the Black Arts Movement.

As there was a focus on live performance among the Beats, many slam poets have claimed to be influenced by the Beats. Saul Williams, for example, cites Allen Ginsberg, Amiri Baraka, and Bob Kaufman as major influences.

The Postbeat Poets are direct descendants of the Beat Generation. Their association with or tutelage under Ginsberg at The Naropa University's Jack Kerouac School of Disembodied Poetics and later at Brooklyn College stressed the social-activist legacy of the Beats and created its own body of literature. Known authors are Anne Waldman, Antler, Andy Clausen, David Cope, Eileen Myles, Eliot Katz, Paul Beatty, Sapphire, Lesléa Newman, Jim Cohn, Thomas R. Peters Jr. (poet and owner of beat book shop), Sharon Mesmer, Randy Roark, Josh Smith, Marc Olmsted and David Evans.

=== Rock and Pop Music ===
The Beats had a pervasive influence on rock and roll and popular music, including the Beatles, Bob Dylan and Jim Morrison. The Beatles spelled their name with an "a" partly as a Beat Generation reference, and John Lennon was a fan of Jack Kerouac. The Beatles even put Beat writer William S. Burroughs on the cover of their album Sgt. Pepper's Lonely Hearts Club Band.

Ginsberg was a close friend of Bob Dylan and toured with him on the Rolling Thunder Revue in 1975. Dylan cites Ginsberg and other Beats as major influences.

Jim Morrison cites Kerouac as one of his biggest influences, and fellow Doors member Ray Manzarek has said "We wanted to be beatniks." In his book Light My Fire: My Life with The Doors, Manzarek also writes "I suppose if Jack Kerouac had never written On the Road, The Doors would never have existed." Michael McClure was also a friend of members of The Doors, at one point touring with Manzarek.

Ginsberg was a friend of Ken Kesey's Merry Pranksters, a group of which Neal Cassady was a member, that also included members of the Grateful Dead. In the 1970s, Burroughs was a friend of Mick Jagger, Lou Reed, David Bowie, and Patti Smith.

The musical group Steely Dan is named after a steam-powered dildo in Burroughs' Naked Lunch. British progressive rock band Soft Machine is named after Burroughs' novel The Soft Machine.

Singer-songwriter Tom Waits, a Beat fan, wrote "Jack and Neal" about Kerouac and Cassady, and recorded "On the Road" (a song written by Kerouac after finishing the novel) with Primus. He later collaborated with Burroughs on the theatrical work The Black Rider.

Jazz musician/film composer Robert Kraft wrote and released a contemporary homage to Beat Generation aesthetics entitled "Beat Generation" on the 1988 album Quake City.

Musician Mark Sandman, who was the bass guitarist, lead vocalist, and a former member of the alternative jazz rock band Morphine, was interested in the Beat Generation and wrote a song called "Kerouac" as a tribute to Jack Kerouac and his philosophy and way of life.

The band Aztec Two-Step recorded "The Persecution & Restoration of Dean Moriarty (On the Road)" in 1972.

There was a resurgence of interest in the beats among bands in the 1980s. Ginsberg worked with the Clash and Burroughs worked with Sonic Youth, R.E.M., Kurt Cobain, and Ministry, among others. Bono of U2 cites Burroughs as a major influence, and Burroughs appeared briefly in a U2 video in 1997. Post-punk band Joy Division named a song "Interzone" after a collection of stories by Burroughs. Laurie Anderson featured Burroughs on her 1984 album Mister Heartbreak and in her 1986 concert film, Home of the Brave. The band King Crimson produced the album Beat inspired by the Beat Generation.

More recently, American artist Lana Del Rey references the Beat movement and Beat poetry in her 2014 song "Brooklyn Baby".

In 2021, rapper R.A.P. Ferreria released the album Bob's Son: R.A.P. Ferreira in the Garden Level Cafe of the Scallops Hotel, named for Bob Kaufman and containing many references to the work of Kaufman, Jack Kerouac, Amiri Baraka, and other beat poets.

== Criticism ==
The Beat Generation was met with scrutiny and assigned many stereotypes. Several magazines, including Life and Playboy, depicted members of the Beat Generation as nihilists and as nonintellectual. This criticism was largely due to the ideological differences between American culture at the time and the Beat Generation, including their Buddhist-inspired beliefs.

Norman Podhoretz, a student at Columbia with Kerouac and Ginsberg, later became a critic of the Beats. His 1958 Partisan Review article "The Know-Nothing Bohemians" was a vehement critique primarily of Kerouac's On the Road and The Subterraneans, as well as Ginsberg's "Howl". His central criticism is that the Beat's embrace of spontaneity is bound up in an anti-intellectual worship of the "primitive" that can easily turn toward mindlessness and violence. Podhoretz asserted that there was a link between the Beats and criminal delinquents.

Ginsberg responded in a 1958 interview with The Village Voice, specifically addressing the charge that the Beats destroyed "the distinction between life and literature". In the interview, he stated that "the bit about anti-intellectualism is a piece of vanity, we had the same education, went to the same school, you know there are 'Intellectuals' and there are intellectuals. Podhoretz is just out of touch with twentieth-century literature, he's writing for the eighteenth-century mind. We have a personal literature now—Proust, Wolfe, Faulkner, Joyce."

=== Internal Criticism ===
In a 1974 interview, Gary Snyder comments on the subject of "casualties" of the Beat Generation:

Kerouac was a casualty too. And there were many other casualties that most people have never heard of, but were genuine casualties. Just as, in the 60s, when Allen and I for a period there were almost publicly recommending people to take acid. When I look back on that now I realize there were many casualties, and responsibilities to bear.

According to Manuel Luis Martinez, initially the Beats, without distinguishing between corporatist conformism and communal egalitarianism, set out to construct nonconformist communities based on marginalized ethnic identities, usually Black identity and Mexican identity. But even surrounded by their communal creations, they began to fear being racially absorbed and thus rejected their own communal life. Beats responded to absorption and conformity in various ways, reflecting the social conflicts of the 1950s and 1960s. In their quest to transform the "American Individual", the Beats deeply engaged with questions of race, the place of the white man in America, reforming the patriarchy, and reinventing the self.

== Quotes ==
Three writers do not make a generation.

— Gregory Corso (sometimes also attributed to Gary Snyder)

Nobody knows whether we were catalysts or invented something, or just the froth riding on a wave of its own. We were all three, I suppose.

— Allen Ginsberg

== Films ==
- D.O.A. (1949) — a film noir, set in San Francisco, which includes one of the earliest (fictional) depictions of the Beat culture
- Jack Kerouac (wrote), Robert Frank and Alfred Leslie (directed) Pull My Daisy (1958)
- Bell, Book and Candle (1958, movie)
- The Beat Generation (1959, movie)
- A Bucket of Blood (1959) Roger Corman Production
- The Subterraneans (1960, movie)
- Visit to a Small Planet (1960, movie)
- Greenwich Village Story (1961)
- Next Stop, Greenwich Village (1976)
- Heart Beat (1980, movie)
- What Happened to Kerouac? (1986, documentary)
- Absolute Beginners (1986, movie)
- Naked Lunch (1991, movie)
- Life and Times of Allen Ginsberg (1993, documentary)
- So I Married an Axe Murderer (1993, movie)
- Allen Ginsberg Live in London (1995, documentary)
- The Last Time I Committed Suicide (1997)
- The Source (1999, documentary)
- Beat (2000, movie)
- American Saint (2001, movie)
- Words of Advice: William S. Burroughs on the Road (2007)
- Neal Cassady (2007)
- Crazy Wisdom: The Jack Kerouac School of Disembodied Poetics (2008, documentary)
- Howl (2010, movie)
- William S. Burroughs: A Man Within (2010, documentary)
- Magic Trip (2011, documentary)
- Big Sur (2012, movie)
- Corso: The Last Beat (2012, documentary)
- On the Road (2012, movie)
- The Beat Hotel (2012, documentary)
- Kill Your Darlings (2013, movie)
- Ferlinghetti: A Rebirth of Wonder (2013, documentary)
- Inside Llewyn Davis (2013, movie)
- William S. Burroughs' Queer (2024, movie)

== See also ==
- Beatnik
- Beat Scene
- Beatdom Literary Journal
- European Beat Studies Network (EBSN)
- Counterculture of the 1960s
- Literary Kicks
- San Francisco Oracle
- New York School
- Christopher Felver
- Silent Generation
- Generation gap
- Hippie movement

== Sources ==
- Charters, Ann (ed.) (1992) The Portable Beat Reader. Penguin Books. ISBN 0-670-83885-3 (hc); ISBN 0-14-015102-8 (pbk). The table of contents is online.
- Charters, Ann (ed.) (2001) Beat Down to Your Soul: What Was the Beat Generation? NY: Penguin, 2001. ISBN 0-14-100151-8
- Knight, Arthur Winfield. Ed. The Beat Vision (1987) Paragon House. ISBN 0-913729-40-X; ISBN 0-913729-41-8 (pbk)
- Knight, Brenda. Women of the Beat Generation: The Writers, Artists, and Muses at the Heart of a Revolution. ISBN 1-57324-138-5
- McClure, Michael. Scratching the Beat Surface: Essays on New Vision from Blake to Kerouac. Penguin, 1994. ISBN 0-14-023252-4
- Miles, Barry (2001). Ginsberg: A Biography. London: Virgin Publishing Ltd., paperback, 628 pages, ISBN 0-7535-0486-3
- Morgan, Ted (1983) Literary Outlaw The Life and Times of William S. Burroughs. ISBN 0-380-70882-5, first printing, trade paperback edition Avon, NY, NY
- Phillips, Lisa. Beat Culture and the New America 1950–1965 was published by the Whitney Museum of American Art in accordance with an exhibition in 1995/1996. ISBN 0-87427-098-7 softcover. ISBN 2-08-013613-5 hardcover (Flammarion)
- Raskin, Jonah. American Scream: Allen Ginsberg's "Howl" and the Making of the Beat Generation. University of California Press, 2004. ISBN 0-520-24015-4
- Starer, Jacqueline. Les écrivains de la Beat Generation éditions d'écarts Dol de Bretagne France. ISBN 978-2-919121-02-1
- Weidner, Chad. The Green Ghost: William Burroughs and the Ecological Mind. Carbondale, IL: Southern Illinois University Press, 2016. ISBN 978-0809334865
