= Edie Parker =

American writer (1922–1993)

- Born: September 20, 1922; Detroit, Michigan, U.S.
- Died: October 29, 1993 (aged 71); Grosse Pointe, Michigan, U.S.
- Occupation: Writer
- Spouses: Jack Kerouac (m. 1944; ann. 1952) Michael Dietz (m. 1950; div. 1959) Patrick Garvin (m. 1959; div. 1969)

Edie Kerouac-Parker (September 20, 1922 – October 29, 1993) was an American writer who was the author of the memoir You'll Be Okay, about her life with her first husband, Jack Kerouac, and the early days of the Beat Generation. While an art student under George Grosz at Barnard College, she and fellow Barnard student and friend Joan Vollmer shared an apartment on 118th Street in New York City which came to be frequented by many of the then unknown Beats, among them Vollmer's eventual husband William S. Burroughs, and fellow Columbia students Jack Kerouac and Allen Ginsberg as well as Lucien Carr.

Born Frances Edith Parker in Detroit, to Walter Milton Parker, Jr. and Charlotte Frances (née Maire) Parker, and was raised in Grosse Pointe Park, Michigan. The 18-year old Edie met Jean-Louis Lebris de Kérouac (aka Jack Kerouac) while an art student at Columbia University. The couple were married on August 22, 1944, at Manhattan Municipal Building in a civil ceremony in downtown New York. At the time, Jack was in jail as an accessory after the fact in Lucien Carr's murder of David Kammerer. This event expedited their intention to marry as Jack's father, Leo, refused to bail him out of jail. Jack was released from jail long enough for him and Edie to be escorted downtown by two NYPD detectives to be married. Once married, Edie could access an inheritance from her grandfather's then-unprobated estate to post Kerouac's bail.

The couple left New York on a train in September 1944 to relocate to Michigan, where they would live together briefly in the Grosse Pointe Park home of her mother and younger sister, Charlotte Frances (nee Parker) Pattison. Edie and Jack separated only two months after their wedding, with Jack leaving Michigan in October 1944 to head back to New York while Edie remained in Grosse Pointe Park. Two years later Edie filed for a Decree of Annulment in September 1946, and the marriage would be invalidated by the Archdiocese of Detroit in April 1952. She attended Michigan State University for one semester to study Horticulture in Fall 1948. She would marry and divorce two more times between 1950 and 1969, to Michael Dietz (1915-1981) and Patrick Garvin (1930-2005), and would then remain single for the rest of her life. In the 1980s and early 1990s she made personal appearances, locally in Metro Detroit and at special events across the US, billed as 'Frankie Edie Kerouac-Parker,' discussing her memoir writing, involvement with the Beats, and her relationship with Jack Kerouac. Edie died in Grosse Pointe on October 29, 1993, from heart disease and diabetes.

Edie appears as Judie Smith in Kerouac's novel The Town and the City, Elly in Visions of Cody, Edna "Johnnie" Palmer of Vanity of Duluoz, and herself in "The Original Scroll" – the unedited edition of On the Road. Edie was played by actress Elizabeth Olsen in the film Kill Your Darlings. Edie's memoir, You'll Be Okay – My Life with Jack Kerouac, was published posthumously in 2007 by City Lights.
