= Herbert Huncke =

American writer and poet

- Huncke in 1985
- Born: Herbert Edwin Huncke; January 9, 1915; Greenfield, Massachusetts, U.S.
- Died: August 8, 1996 (aged 81); New York City, U.S.
- Occupation: Writer
- Writing career
- Movement: Beat Generation

Herbert Edwin Huncke (/ˈhʌŋki/ HUNK-ee; January 9, 1915 – August 8, 1996) was an American writer and poet, and an active participant in a number of emerging cultural, social and aesthetic movements of the 20th century in America. He was a member of the Beat Generation and is reputed to have coined the term.

== Early life ==
Born in Greenfield, Massachusetts, and raised in Chicago, Herbert Huncke was a street hustler, high school dropout, and drug user. He left Chicago as a teenager after his parents divorced and began living as a hobo, jumping trains throughout the United States and bonding with other vagrants through shared destitution and common experience. Although Huncke later came to regret his loss of family ties, in his autobiography, Guilty of Everything, he states that his lengthy jail sentences were a partial result of his lack of family support.

== New York City and Times Square ==
Huncke hitchhiked to New York City in 1939. He was dropped off at 103rd and Broadway, and he asked the driver how to find 42nd Street. "You walk straight down Broadway" the man said, "and you will find 42nd Street." Huncke, always a stylish dresser, bought a boutonnière for his jacket and headed for 42nd Street. For the next 10 years, Huncke was a 42nd Street regular and became known as the "Mayor of 42nd Street".

At this point, Huncke's regular haunts were 42nd Street and Times Square, where he associated with a variety of people, including prostitutes (male and female) and sailors. During World War II, Huncke shipped out to sea as a United States Merchant Mariner to ports in South America, Africa, and Europe. He landed on the beach of Normandy three days after the invasion.

Aboard ships, Huncke would overcome his drug addiction or maintain it with morphine syrettes supplied by the ship medic. When he returned to New York, he returned to 42nd Street, and it was after one such trip where he met the then-unknown William S. Burroughs, who was selling a sub-machine gun and a box of syrettes. Their first meeting was not cordial: from Burroughs' appearance and manner, Huncke suspected that he was "heat" (undercover police or FBI). Assured that Burroughs was harmless, Huncke bought the morphine and, at Burroughs' request, immediately gave him an injection. Burroughs later wrote a fictionalized account of the meeting in Junkie. Huncke also became a close friend of Joan Adams Vollmer Burroughs, William's common-law wife, sharing with her a taste for amphetamines. In the late 1940s, he was invited to Texas to grow marijuana on the Burroughs' farm. It was here he renewed his acquaintance with the young Abe Green, a fellow train jumper and in the early beatnik scene, a regular reciter of spontaneous poetry. Despite his comparative youth, Green was often referred to by Huncke as "Old Faithful". Huncke valued loyalty and it is thought that Abe Green was of "inestimable assistance" to Lucien Carr and Jack Kerouac when it came to the concealment of the weapon used to kill David Kammerer some years later.

In 1942, Huncke was recruited to be a subject in Alfred Kinsey's research on the sexual habits of the American male. He was interviewed by Kinsey, and recruited fellow addicts and friends to participate. Huncke had been an unpublished writer since his days in Chicago, and he gravitated toward literary types and musicians. In the music world, Huncke visited all the jazz clubs and associated with Billie Holiday, Charlie Parker, and Dexter Gordon (with whom he was once busted on 42nd Street for breaking into a parked car). When he first met Allen Ginsberg, Kerouac, and Burroughs, they were interested in writing, and they were unpublished too. They were inspired by his stories of 42nd Street life, criminal life, street slang, and his vast experience with drugs. Huncke was immortalized in Kerouac's On the Road as the character Elmo Hassel.

In the late 1940s, Ginsberg, Jack Melody and Vickie Russell were apprehended after flipping a car in Queens, New York, trying to run over a NYPD motorcycle cop. Huncke was picked up simultaneously as he was living with Ginsberg. Huncke was sentenced to a five-year term in the New York State Prison System. "Someone had to do the bit", he recalled. Ginsberg, a student at Columbia University, was sent to a mental hospital for six months. Vickie Russell's (a.k.a. Perscilla Arminger) father was a judge in a neighboring state and took custody of her, relieving her of jail time. Jack Melody's mother was associated with the Brooklyn mafia and she took custody of Little Jack.

When Huncke was released from prison on parole Little Jack's family set him up with a job in an ornamental glass company in Manhattan near 23rd Street. Ginsberg, initially, on the advice of his psychiatrist, refused to see Huncke upon release.

== Writing career ==
Huncke himself was a natural storyteller, a unique character with a paradoxically honest take on life. Later, after the formation of the so-called Beat Generation, members of the Beats encouraged Huncke to publish his notebook writings (Huncke's Journal), which he did with limited success in 1965 with Diane DiPrima's Poet's Press. Huncke used the word "Beat" to describe someone living with no money and few prospects. "Beat to my socks", he said. Huncke coined the phrase in a conversation with Jack Kerouac, who was interested in how their generation would be remembered. "I'm beat", was Huncke's reply, meaning tired and beat to his socks. Kerouac used the term to describe an entire generation. Jack Kerouac later insisted that "Beat" was derived from beatification, to be supremely happy. However, it is thought that this definition was a defense of the beat way of life, which was frowned upon and offended many American sensibilities.

Huncke's autobiography, titled Guilty of Everything, was recorded by sociologist Michael Agar in the early 1970s in R'lene Dahlberg's Third Avenue Apartment. The transcript of these recordings were edited by Roger Goodman, head of the English Department at Stuyvesant High School and Paul Metcalf (grandson of Herman Melville). Portions of the manuscript was edited again by Raymond Foye's Hanuman Books (1987) and Don Kennison for Paragon Press (1990). A complete transcript of the Huncke/Agar recordings has not been found. Several of the tapes still exist while others have been lost or misplaced.

In 1991, Huncke was crowned King of the Beaux-Arts Ball in New York. He presided with Queen Fay Wray.

Huncke died in 1996 at age 81. He had been living for several years in a basement apartment on East 7th Street near Avenue D in New York City, supported financially by his friends. In his last few years, he lived in the Chelsea Hotel, where his rent came from financial support from Jerry Garcia of the Grateful Dead, whom Huncke never met.

== Quotes on Huncke ==
Jack Kerouac described Huncke in his "Now it's Jazz" reading from Desolation Angels, chapter 77:

Huck, whom you'll see on Times Square, somnolent and alert, sad, sweet, dark, holy. Just out of jail. Martyred. Tortured by sidewalks, starved for sex and companionship, open to anything, ready to introduce a new world with a shrug.

John Clellon Holmes described Albert Ancke, his representation of Huncke in Go in Chapter 14 of part 2:

A sallow, wrinkled little hustler, hatless and occupying a crumpled sport shirt as though crouched in it to hide his withered body.

Admired by David Wojnarowicz in his personal diaries, In the Shadow of the American Dream, where their meetings/dates are documented.

Frank McCourt mentions knowing Huncke in Chapter 16 of Teacher Man:

Alcohol is not his habit but he'll kindly allow you to buy him a drink at Montero's. His voice is deep, gentle and musical. He never forgets his manners and you'd rarely think of him as Huncke the Junkie. He respects law and obeys none of it.

== Huncke in film ==
Huncke was featured in several documentaries about the Beat generation, including Janet Forman's The Beat Generation: An American Dream (1986), Richard Lerner and Lewis MacAdams' Jack Kerouac: What Happened to Kerouac? (1986), John Antonelli's Kerouac, the Movie (1984), and Howard Brookner's documentary about William Burroughs, Burroughs (1983). He also starred in his only acting role in The Burning Ghat (1990), a short film by James Rasin and Jerome Poynton who later became Huncke's literary executor upon his death in 1996.

== Works ==
- Huncke's Journal (Poets Press, 1965). Out of Print. Edited by Diane Di Prima, foreword by Allen Ginsberg.
- The Evening Sun Turned Crimson (Cherry Valley, NY: Cherry Valley Editions, 1980), ISBN 0-916156-43-5.
- Guilty of Everything (excerpt) Edited by Raymond Foye. (New York & Madras: Hanuman Books, 1987), ISBN 0-937815-08-X
- Guilty of Everything: The Autobiography of Herbert Huncke (New York: Paragon House Publishers, 1990), Edited by Don Kennison, foreword by William S. Burroughs. ISBN 1-55778-044-7.
- Again–The Hospital (White Fields Press, Louisville, 1995). 1/50 copies. (Broadside; single sheet, measuring 12 by 22 inches, illustrated with a photograph of Huncke.)
- Herbert E. Huncke 1915-1996 (New York: Jerry Poynton 1996). (Limited edition of 500 copies of the program for the Herbert Huncke memorial at Friends Meetinghouse, New York City. Includes original texts.)
- The Herbert Huncke Reader edited by Ben Schafer (New York: Morrow, 1997), ISBN 0-688-15266-X. (Includes the complete texts of The Evening Sun Turned Crimson and Huncke's Journal).
- From Dream to Dream (Dig It! 567912-2, Music & Words, Netherlands, 1994, cd)
- Herbert Huncke - Guilty of Everything. Double-CD of Huncke's 1987 live reading at Ins & Outs Press, Amsterdam, the Netherlands. Co-production released by Unrequited Records, San Francisco (2012).
