= Ann Breese =

American painter (1924–2019)

Ann Howard Breese
- Born: May 27, 1924; Lake Forest, Illinois
- Died: April 3, 2019 (aged 94); Denver, Colorado
- Education: Bennington College (BFA)
- Known for: Painting
- Movement: Abstract expressionism
- Spouse(s): Charles Sink (div. 1969); Edward D. White Jr.
- Children: Mark Sink, Carol Patterson, Jenny Freeman

Ann Howard Breese (May 27, 1924 – April 3, 2019) was an American painter. A prominent figure in the Denver arts community, Breese was an early abstract expressionist, producing a large body of genre work in the mid-1940s and early 1950s. A prolific lifelong artist, Breese would continue creating well into her advanced age.

== Early life and education ==
Ann Howard Breese was born on May 27, 1924, in Lake Forest, Illinois, the youngest of four children. The Breese family would shortly thereafter relocate to Santa Fe, New Mexico at the behest of the senior Breese, who had months prior made a fuel-related emergency (aircraft) landing near the then-village.

A precocious youth, Ann demonstrated immediate artistic ability. Randall Davey, a neighbor and friend of the family, noted Ann's talents and resolved to provide her education and direction. Ann received little to no formal education in her formative years, relying largely on good-will private tutoring from prominent community members and ad-hoc boarding. Ann's friendship with Gustave Baumann's daughter, Ann, established an amicable relationship between the two families. Breese, in an autobiography published in the 1990s, would fondly recall Baumann's influence on both her art and personal life.

Ann attended The Sandia School in Albuquerque, New Mexico, a private girls-only preparatory school.

Ann would go on to attend Bennington College, where she studied with, in part, modernist artist Paul Feeley. In order to fulfill Bennington's degree requirements, Ann traveled to Mexico City to study under prominent modernist Diego Rivera.

== Career ==
Breese graduated from Bennington in 1947. In the early to mid 1950s, Breese began experimenting with oil painting and traveled to New York to observe work done by close family friend Adolph Gottlieb. Taken with the immediacy of abstraction (especially with Color field movement), Breese began making some of her earliest professional work in an expressionist mode. Breese was featured in a variety of Denver metropolitan area exhibitions and galleries, especially for her watercolor work. The bulk of Breese's work was done in acrylic as it provided for rapid, sustained experimentation.

Breese is credited with establishing a variety of art societies in the Denver metropolitan area, including, but not limited to "The Nine", The Alliance for Contemporary Art, (now a subsidiary of the Denver Art Museum), and various youth outreach programs. Breese's work was a regular interest of prominent collectors, especially in Denver. "The Nine" regularly exhibited work by Breese.

Later in life, Breese would make a marked departure from her abstract work. While still appreciably impressionistic, Breese's subject material transitioned largely from subjective feeling-states to more objective situations and forms. Landscape and figural work featured prominently, a trend that would persist until her death in 2019.

== Personal life ==
In the same year as returning to Santa Fe, Breese would meet her first husband, architect and World War II veteran Charles Sink. Sink was stationed in nearby Los Alamos, completing designs for the Los Alamos National Laboratory. Their marriage would see the birth of their three children: Mark Sink, a contemporary fine art photographer based in Denver, Jennifer, a painter, and Carol, an ethnographer. As a mother, Breese produced a large volume of work, and her experiences with child rearing would later inform her philanthropic interests.

Breese and Sink separated in the late 1960s. Breese would remarry to prominent architect and beat proponent Edward D. White Jr.. White passed in 2017, aged 92.

Breese obtained an arts teaching certificate from the University of Denver in the late 1960s. Breese taught at a variety of front range high schools; her program, the Scholastic Art Awards, provided opportunities to youth artists to exhibit their work in New York. Breese regularly volunteered with the Denver Art Museum, earning various recognition awards for her efforts. For the museum's 75th anniversary, Breese was tapped as a portrait artist for a reception night.

Breese, through her father, is the grand-niece of Samuel Morse.

Ann passed away on April 3, 2019. She was 94 years old.

== See also ==
- Charles Sink
- Denver, Colorado
- Edward D. White Jr.
- Abstract Expressionism
