= Amanda Benchley =

American journalist, author and filmmaker

- Education: Princeton University; Columbia University Graduate School of Journalism
- Occupations: Journalist, author, filmmaker
- Notable credit: Pretty Dirty: The Life and Times of Marilyn Minter

Amanda Benchley (née MacKenzie) is an American journalist, author, and documentary filmmaker.

== Early life and education ==
Benchley attended Peck School in Morristown, New Jersey, and later Kent Place School. Her father was a judge and her mother was a real estate broker. Benchley studied art and archaeology at Princeton University, graduating in 1991. She later returned to education when she was 40 years old, studying at Columbia University Graduate School of Journalism.

== Career ==
In her early career, Benchley worked as a documentary filmmaker for History Channel and A&E.

Benchley has coauthored several coffee table books published by Abrams Books. Artists Living with Art: Inside the Homes and Collections of Contemporary Artists, co-written with Stacey Goergen, was published in 2015. The book explores the private homes and art collections of 30 notable modern artists, photographed by Oberto Gil.

With Bridget Moynahan, Benchley co-wrote Our Shoes, Our Selves: 40 Women, 40 Stories, 40 Pairs of Shoes, a collection of interviews with women about the stories behind their favorite shoes, featuring photography by Melanie Dunea. It was published in April 2019.

In 2023, Benchley co-wrote, with Tamara Weiss, the book Vineyard Folk: Creative People and Places of Martha's Vineyard, presenting the works of artists on Martha's Vineyard, photographed by Elizabeth Cecil. A follow-up with the same collaborators, Hudson Folk: Creative People and Places in the Hudson Valley, focusing on artists of the Hudson Valley, was published in 2026.

Open Studio: Do It Yourself Art Projects by Contemporary Artists, co-written with Sharon Coplan Hurowitz and photographed by Casey Kelbaugh, was published by Phaidon Press in 2020. The book presents interviews with contemporary artists alongside projects they devised for readers to try at home.

Pretty Dirty: The Life and Times of Marilyn Minter, co-directed by Bentley and Jennifer Ash Rudick, premiered at the Hamptons International Film Festival in 2025. The documentary explores the life and career of contemporary artist Marilyn Minter.

== Personal life ==
In 1994, Amanda married Clayton Benchley, son of Peter Benchley, the author of Jaws. She has two children, Teddy and Eloise.
