= David Von Drehle =

American author and journalist

- Born: February 6, 1961 (age 65); Denver, Colorado, U.S.
- Education: University of Denver (1983)
- Occupation: Journalist
- Employer(s): The Denver Post (1978–1983); Miami Herald (1985–1991); The Washington Post (1991–2006; 2017–2025); Time magazine (2006–2017)
- Spouse: Karen Ball (m. 1995; died 2023)

David James Von Drehle (born February 6, 1961) is an American author and journalist.

== Early life and education ==
Von Drehle was born in Denver, Colorado, and raised in Aurora, Colorado. He earned his B.A. in 1983 from the University of Denver, where he was also a Boettcher Foundation Scholar and editor of the Denver Clarion, the student newspaper. In 1985 Von Drehle graduated from the University of Oxford with a Master of Letters as a Marshall Scholar in English literature.

== Career ==
Von Drehle started his career in journalism at 17 years old, working with The Denver Post as a sports writer from 1978 to 1983, where he was the youngest sports writer that the paper has had. From there he moved on to the Miami Herald in 1985 and stayed on with the paper until 1991 as a staff writer and New York correspondent. In 1988 while writing for the Miami Herald Von Drehle was awarded a Livingston Award, which recognizes excellence in young journalism and is given annually to journalist younger than 35 years of age. Von Drehle was honored for a series titled "The Death Penalty: A Failure of Execution". He was 27 at the time of the award, the youngest of the three journalists recognized that year. The piece also garnered Von Drehle the American Bar Association's Silver Gavel Award for excellence in Media and the Arts in 1989. During his tenure with the Miami Herald, von Drehle also received an American Society of News Editors Distinguished Writing Award, and has subsequently been featured in ASNE's collections of America's Best Newspaper Writing.

In 1991, Von Drehle became the New York bureau chief for The Washington Post. Within months, he was sent to New Hampshire to cover the 1992 presidential primary, thus beginning his career as a political writer. He went on to be the editor of the Arts section, and the Assistant Managing Editor in charge of the Style section. By his own admission in an article in National Journal, Von Drehle says, "I like to change gears every four or five years."

David Von Drehle left The Washington Post in 2006 to become Editor-at-Large for Time. He went on to write more than 60 cover stories while at Time. Notable examples include the 2008 Person of the Year (Barack Obama); a cover piece on controversial commentator Glenn Beck titled "Mad Man" that appeared in the September 17, 2009 issue; coverage of the deaths of Michael Jackson and Osama bin Laden; the 2014 Person of the Year (Ebola Fighters); and a magazine-length essay on forgiveness after the murders at Emanuel A.M.E. Church in Charleston, S.C. That article won the Deadline Award for Best Magazine Feature of 2015.

Von Drehle returned to The Washington Post in 2017 as a twice-weekly opinion columnist. He was also a recurring contributor to NPR's Morning Edition, including a discussion of Bob Woodward in light of Von Drehle's front-page article confirming the identity of the FBI's Mark Felt as "Deep Throat." He left The Washington Post in 2025.

He is also the author of several award-winning and bestselling books.

== Personal life ==
In 1995, he married Karen Ball, the White House correspondent for the New York Daily News. They moved to Kansas City, Missouri with their four children; Ball died in 2023.

== Awards and honors ==
- 1989 Livingston Award for National Reporting
- 1996: American Bar Association Silver Gavel honorable mention for Among the Lowest of the Dead, a narrative history and analysis of the modern death penalty system in Florida; "perhaps the finest book ever written about capital punishment —Chicago Tribune.
- Sidney Hillman Foundation book prize for Triangle
- New York Society Library book of the year for Triangle
- New York Times Notable Book of the Year for Triangle
- Christopher Award for Triangle
- New York Public Library Book to Remember for Triangle
- Abraham Lincoln Group of New York Award of Achievement for Rise to Greatness
- Society of Midland Authors Biography award for Rise to Greatness

== Works and publications ==
Books

External videos
- Booknotes interview with Von Drehle on Triangle: The Fire That Changed America, October 5, 2003, C-SPAN
- Presentation by Von Drehle on Rise to Greatness: Abraham Lincoln and America's Most Perilous Year, November 13, 2012, C-SPAN

- Von Drehle, David (1995). Among the lowest of the dead : inside death row. New York: Fawcett Crest. ISBN 978-0-449-22523-3.
- Deadlock: The Inside Story of America's Closest Election. New York: PublicAffairs. 2001. ISBN 1586480804. (An account of the 2000 presidential recount in Florida, written with reporting by The Washington Post political staff; was a source book for the Emmy-winning HBO movie "Recount".)
- Triangle: The Fire That Changed America. New York: Atlantic Monthly Press. 2003. ISBN 0871138743.(Sidney Hillman Foundation book prize, New York Society Library book of the year, New York Times bestseller and Notable Book of the Year, Christopher Award winner, New York Public Library Book to Remember).
- Rise to Greatness: Abraham Lincoln and America's Most Perilous Year. New York: Henry Holt and Co. 2012. ISBN 9780805079708.
- The Book of Charlie: Wisdom from the Remarkable American Life of a 109-Year-Old Man. New York: Simon & Schuster. 2023. ISBN 9781476773940.
  - Adapted excerpt: Von Drehle, David (May 22, 2023). "Opinion: My neighbor lived to be 109. This is what I learned from him". The Washington Post.

Essays and reporting

- Von Drehle, David (April 20, 2015). "Line of fire". Time. Vol. 185, no. 14. With reporting by Josh Sanburn, Justin Worland, Alex Altman and Maya Rhodan (South Pacific ed.). pp. 16–21.

== General Reference ==
- David Von Drehle Papers, 1897-2003. M.E. Grenander Department of Special Collections and Archives, University Libraries, University at Albany, State University of New York (hereafter referred to as the Von Drehle Papers).
