= Colorado Governor's Mansion =

Historic house in Colorado, United States

- U.S. National Register of Historic Places
- Colorado State Register of Historic Properties
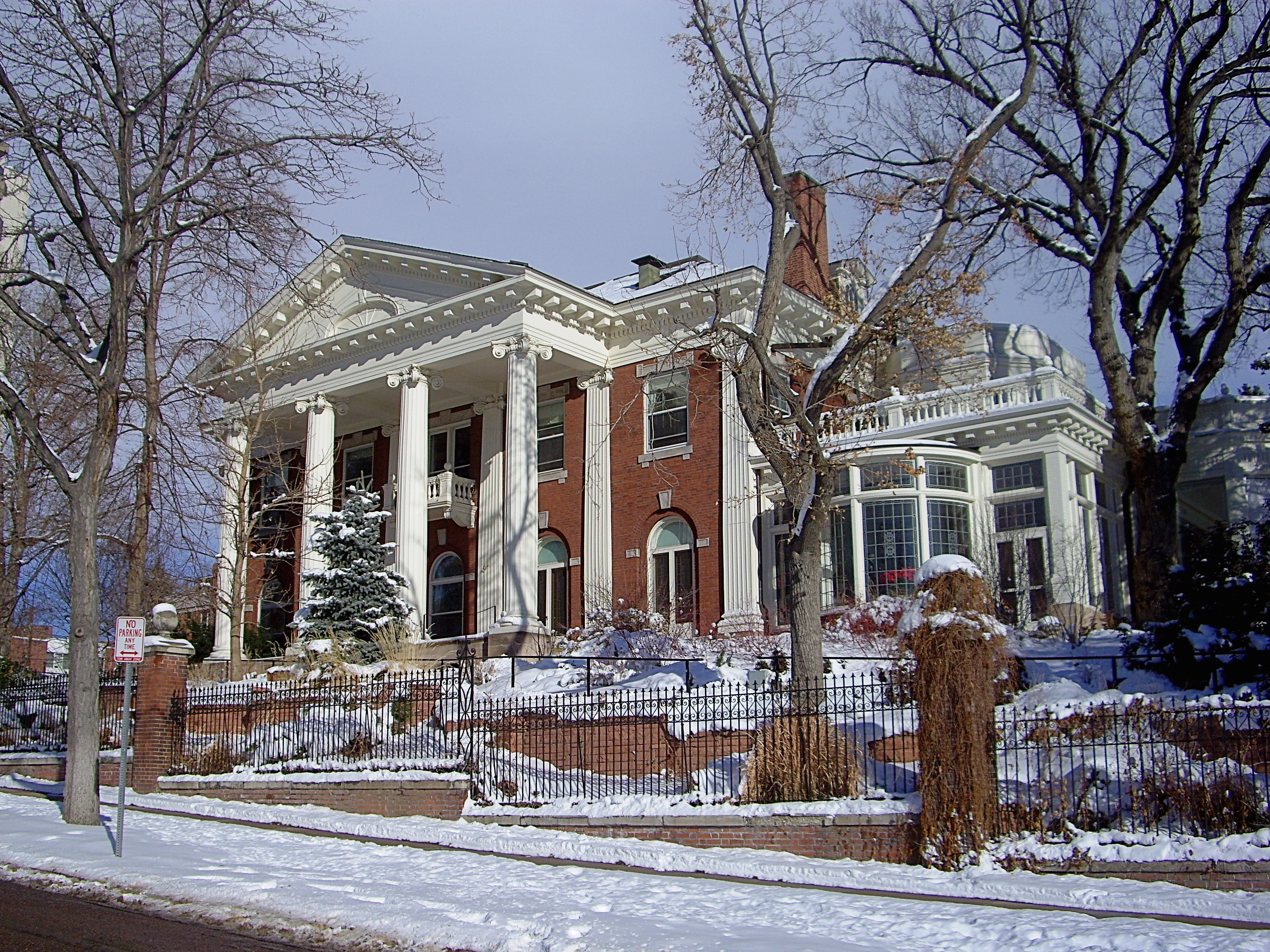

- Location within Colorado Location within the United States
- Location: 400 E. 8th Ave., Denver, Colorado
- Coordinates: 39°43′43″N 104°58′53″W
- Area: 1 acre (0.40 ha)
- Built: 1908
- Architect: Willis A. Marean and Albert J. Norton
- Architectural style: Colonial Revival
- NRHP reference No.: 69000039
- CSRHP No.: 5DV.169
- Added to NRHP: December 3, 1969

The Colorado Governor's Mansion, also known as the Cheesman-Boettcher Mansion, is a historic U.S. mansion in Denver, Colorado. It is located at 400 East 8th Avenue. On December 3, 1969, it was added to the U.S. National Register of Historic Places. It is open free-of-charge for scheduled tours, and also hosts special public events.

== History ==
This building is located in Denver on the southeast corner of 8th Avenue and Logan Street. The exact address is 400 E. 8th Avenue. The Governor's Mansion is also known as the Cheesman-Evans-Boettcher Mansion for its former owners.

The building was built in 1908 after a design by Denver architects Willis A. Marean and Albert J. Norton. The house was originally built as a residence for the widow and the daughter of Denver real estate tycoon Walter Cheesman.

The mansion was designed to accommodate two families. On November 8, 1908, Cheesman's daughter, Gladys, married John Evans II, the grandson of John Evans, the second territorial governor of Colorado. The widowed mother and young couple lived together until the birth of the Evans' first child, after which they relocated. On January 2, 1923, Alice Foster Sanger Cheesman died.

Claude K. Boettcher purchased the mansion on February 23, 1923. Boettcher was the head of a financial empire that eventually included sugar, livestock, cement, potash, steel, securities, utilities, and transportation. Boettcher was famous for his lavish parties which included President Dwight D. Eisenhower in 1952. Boettcher died on June 9, 1957, and his wife in 1958.

The house was inherited by the Boettcher Foundation. The foundation offered the house to the State of Colorado as an Executive Residence. The building needed a great deal of work, and its fate remained uncertain for nine months in 1959 as three agencies of the State rejected the offer. On the last day of 1959, Governor Stephen McNichols accepted the building as a gift to the state.

From then until January, 2011, it has been the residence of Governors Stephen L. R. McNichols, John Love, John D.Vanderhoof, Richard D. Lamm, Roy R. Romer, William Owens, and William Ritter. The building was restored in the 1980s under the direction of Edward D. White Jr. Upon taking office in January 2011, Governor John Hickenlooper and his family decided to maintain their private residence in Denver instead of moving to the Governor's Mansion, though Hickenlooper did move into the mansion on a part-time basis after he separated from his wife in 2012.

Hickenlooper's successor, Jared Polis, also chose to only live in the mansion on a part-time basis, staying there during legislative sessions while retaining his home in Boulder as his primary residence.

== Architecture ==
The Cheesman-Evans-Boettcher Mansion is a formal, late Georgian Revival house. The building is surrounded by a wrought iron fence with cannonball finials on the brick posts. The walls of the mansion are red brick. There is a white wooden frosting under a hipped roof with prominent gabled dormers. The cornice is pedimented and dentiled. The west side portico has massive, two-story fluted Ionic columns. There is a dramatic entry way with grouped columns that support a porch which becomes a balustraded second-story balcony. The semicircular sunroom was added by suggestion of Mrs. Cheesman in 1915, and it overlooks a small park now known as "Governor's Park".

It was built in 1908.
