= Pretty Dirty: The Life and Times of Marilyn Minter =

- Directed by: Jennifer Ash Rudick; Amanda Benchley
- Produced by: Jennifer Ash Rudick; Amanda Benchley; Debi Wisch
- Cinematography: Nelson Walker; Michael Pessah; Sean Price Williams; David Usui
- Edited by: Nyneve Minnear; Kristen Nutile
- Music by: Christian Balvig; Efterklang; Torres
- Release date: October 2025 (Hamptons)
- Running time: 80 minutes
- Country: United States
- Language: English

Pretty Dirty: The Life and Times of Marilyn Minter is a 2025 documentary film which explores the life and work of artist Marilyn Minter. The film premiered at the 2025 Hamptons International Film Festival and also showed at DOC NYC.
