= One Cheesman Place =

High-rise apartment building in Colorado, US

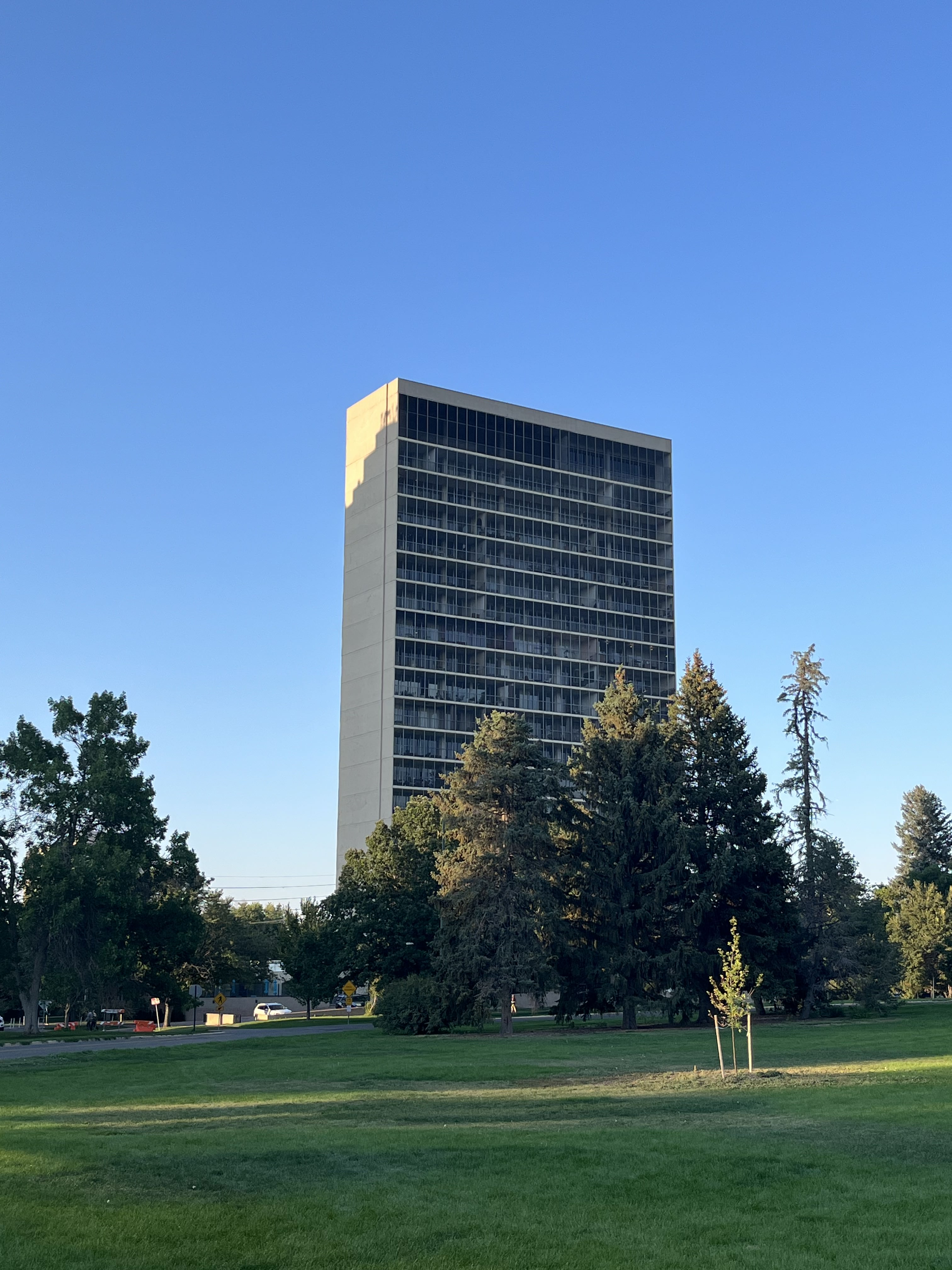
- One Cheesman Place from Cheesman Park, Denver, CO
- Interactive map of the One Cheesman Place area

General information
- Location: 1201 N. Williams Street, Denver, Colorado, United States
- Coordinates: 39°44′12″N 104°58′00″W
- Completed: 1969

Design and construction
- Architect: Charles Sink

One Cheesman Place is a residential high-rise building at 1201 North Williams Street bordering Cheesman Park in Denver, Colorado, United States. It lies on the southern edge of the Wyman Historic District and east of the Humboldt Street Historic District. The building, designed in the international style, is 19 stories high. Completed in 1969, it is one of Denver's most prominent examples of modernist architecture.

The building was designed by the noted Denver architect Charles Sink, a student of Bauhaus founder Walter Gropius and a classmate of I.M. Pei at Harvard University's Graduate School of Design. It has a concrete frame structure and its 32 residences feature screened-in decks facing Cheesman Park.

== Site and construction ==
One Cheesman Place occupies a lot bordered by Gilpin Street to the west, 13th Avenue to the north, Williams Street to the east, and Cheesman Park to the south. The site was previously occupied by a mansion owned by the Coors family and the Randell School, a private preparatory academy. The Capitol Hill neighborhood to Cheesman Park’s west experienced an increase in luxury high-rise construction in the mid-to-late 1950s, largely catering to wealthy transplants from the eastern United States who preferred apartment living to single-family residences. This development trend reached the Cheesman Park area in the 1960s, as the parkside mansions constructed by Denver’s 19th-century elite were gradually razed to construct high-rise apartments.

In 1963, the Denver real estate developer Victor Breeden and architect Charles Sink began conversations about constructing an apartment building in Denver. Soon after, Breeden purchased the land housing the Randell School and the Coors Mansion for that purpose. Construction was overseen by the Gerald H. Phipps Construction Company and began in 1967. The building was completed for a total of $2.5 million in 1969. While digging the building's swimming pool, construction workers uncovered bones from the former graveyard where Cheesman Park now sits.

In 1972, Victor Breeden sold One Cheesman Place to a consortium of Denver investors who converted the building into condominiums, an arrangement that remains in place today.

== Architecture ==
From their initial conversations, Breeden and Sink wished to build a structure “into which they could channel stimulating new design ideas” that “hadn’t ever been done in Denver." In Breeden's view, the high-rise apartments being constructed in Denver at the time were of low quality and would "fall apart in five years." Sink designed One Cheesman Place to counter this trend and to introduce modernist design to Denver's luxury apartment sector.

As a result of Breeden's and Sink's emphasis on modernist design, One Cheesman Place is distinctive among the high-rises bordering Cheesman Park. The structure's south façade features screened-in balconies in every unit, with a double-height balcony on the top floor. The west, north, and east façades are sanded slabs of concrete with narrow windows that give the building a monolithic appearance. The building’s front entrance faces Cheesman Park and is accessed by a private driveway that loops around the structure. Its lobby is spare, with unadorned brick floors leading to double elevators. Each apartment unit faces Cheesman Park, with screened-in balconies extending the living space outdoors by ten feet. Residential floors are 4,200 square feet and contain two units each. The 19th floor features mechanical space and a community room that can be rented out for social functions.

Documents in the Charles Sink Collection at the Denver Public Library's Western History Collection show that One Cheesman Place’s design was inspired in part by I.M. Pei’s Society Hill Towers in Philadelphia; Skidmore, Owings, & Merrill’s Dewitt-Chestnut Apartments in Chicago; and Mies van der Rohe’s Lake Shore Drive Apartments in Chicago.

== Reception ==
Press coverage immediately following One Cheesman Place’s construction indicates that the building was initially well-received. The Rocky Mountain News columnist Duncan Pollock wrote that One Cheesman Place was “distinctive because it embodies the basic elements of good design. The structure is functional and honest, the design is clean. Quite subjectively, the building is beautiful in its clarity and in the way it works with the site.” However, opponents of the building compared its design to the monoliths featured in the film 2001: A Space Odyssey.

One Cheesman Place received an Award of Merit from the Western Mountain Region of the American Institute of Architects (AIA) in 1968, one year before construction was complete. It also received the 25 Year Award from the AIA’s Denver chapter in 2012, in recognition that the building “stood the test of time and still functions in its original capacity."
