= Edward D. White Jr. =

American architect

Edward Divine White Jr. (February 2, 1925 – April 29, 2017), FAIA, was an architect based in Denver, Colorado, whose forty-year practice (1955 through 1995) focused on contemporary architecture and historic preservation. Along with his architectural practice, White was lifelong friend to Jack Kerouac from 1947 to Kerouac's death in 1969. The pair exchanged over 90 letters and postcards during that time.

== Education ==
Born and raised in Denver, White attended Denver Public Schools (Montclair Elementary School, Smiley Junior High School, and East High School (Denver)). Excelling at school, White was encouraged by East High School guidance counselor, Justin W. Brierly, to apply to Columbia University of New York City. Brierly was influential in the acceptance of a number of East High graduates, including White, to Columbia. White was awarded a National Honor Scholarship by Columbia University in 1942 and enrolled that fall. At age 17, he traveled to the east coast for the first time and began his studies.

His studies were interrupted by World War II, and White enlisted in the U.S. Navy in 1943. He completed Midshipmen's School (a year studying at Cornell and 3 months at Northwestern) in 1944, and then was selected to attend the Naval Oriental Language School at the University of Colorado which he completed in 1945. White then served in the Far Eastern Section of Naval Intelligence, evaluating classified Japanese documents. After the war, White returned to Columbia University to complete his studies in the fall of 1946, and graduated Phi Beta Kappa in 1948.

The summer of 1946, White passed much of his time with Hal Chase in Denver. Chase was in correspondence with Kerouac, who he avidly wanted to introduce to White. Upon their return to New York in the fall, Chase arranged for Kerouac to visit he and White the day they arrived. A friendship between the two was sparked, and White was thrown into what would be a critical year for the developing Beat Generation. He and Kerouac were introduced Hal Chase, Joan Adams, Bill Burroughs, Allen Ginsberg and Jack Kerouac were all to meet that year in the post-war Columbia scene.

In 1949, White was awarded a University of Denver Social Science Foundation Grant for study in France; he enrolled at the Université Paris Sorbonne, where he took literature courses and focused on his interest in architecture. After completing his certificate in France, he returned to Columbia University and enrolled in the Graduate School of Architecture, Planning and Preservation, from which he graduated in 1955 with a B. Architecture and a Master of Architecture, and was the 1955 Recipient of Columbia's Hirsch Memorial Prize.

== Architecture ==
=== Fisher, Fisher and Davis ===
Between 1955-1958, White worked as a draftsman and construction supervisor for Fisher, Fisher & Davis Architects in Denver, Colorado. He obtained his architectural license in October 1958.

=== Hornbein & White ===
In 1960 White formed a partnership with Victor Hornbein, Victor Hornbein & Edward D. White Jr. Architects. As a partner in Hornbein & White, a progressive architectural firm in the 1960s, White nurtured his contemporary architecture practice while spending time on national, state and local preservation societies, committees and organizations.

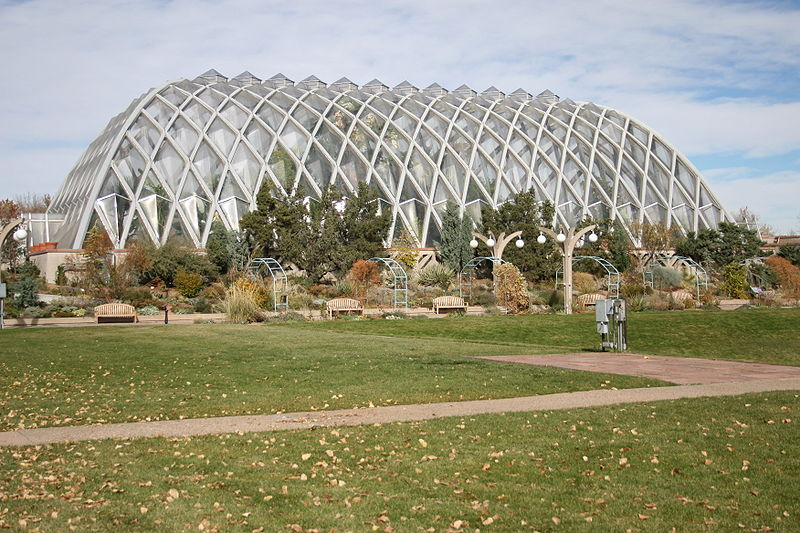
Boettcher Memorial Tropical Conservatory at Denver Botanic Gardens

One of their early projects, the Boettcher Memorial Tropical Conservatory and Mitchell Hall at the Denver Botanic Gardens, was named a Denver Landmark by the City and County of Denver in 1973.

Hornbein & White was also responsible for:

- The design of the Humphreys Classroom Building, the Hamilton Reiman Building, the Foundations Building, and the Gates Science Buildings at Graland Country Day School, for which they were awarded a Design Citation Award from American Institute of Architects, Colorado Society, in 1971.
- Design of the John F. Kennedy Childhood Development Center (1968) and the Children's Psychiatric Day Care Center (1962) on the University of Colorado Health Sciences campus.
- Restoration work for the Denver U.S Post Office and Custom House.
- The Master Plan for Historic Preservation for the Central City Historic District, the restoration of the Central City Opera House ceiling, the Medical Building restoration, the restoration of the historic Lace House in Black Hawk, Colorado, and the Opera House Restoration Report.
- Design, site plan development, and restoration work for the 9th Street Historic Park at Auraria.

The partnership dissolved in 1975, and White continued his restoration and preservation work as Edward D. White Jr. AIA.

=== Edward D. White Jr. FAIA ===
White's firm worked on a number of project for properties listed on the National Register of Historic Places, including:

- Production of architectural and preservation reports, restoration of the Four Mile House, and reconstruction of the Bee House at Four Mile House Park.
- Production of the Carnegie Library Preservation Report for the Boulder Public Library Foundation.
- Production of project reports and stabilization documents, and restoration of fifteen historic structures for the Fryingpan-Arkansas Project for the U.S. Bureau of Reclamation at the Twin Lakes and Interlaken Historic Districts.
- Restoration of the exterior of the Curry-Chukovich House (also known as the Gerash Building).
- Participation in the restoration of the Molly Brown House, specifically the kitchen, pantry, and stairways.
- Restoration of the Colorado State Governor's Mansion.
- College of Fellows, American Institute of Architects, 2004

== Historic preservation ==
White laid the groundwork for and made many contributions to the early years of historic preservation in Colorado. White's grassroots work in preservation had a major impact on the existence and future of the original heart of the city of Denver as well as historic mountain mining communities throughout Colorado. In 2001, September 14 was declared Edward D. White Jr. Day by Mayor Wellington Webb.

White, in consultation with the Urban Subcommittee of the Denver Planning Board, was among a small group of Denver architects whose efforts led to the establishment of the Denver Landmark Preservation Commission. White was appointed to the Commission in 1969 by Denver Mayor William McNichols at the recommendation of the Denver Chapter of the AIA. He was re-appointed by two subsequent Mayors and served ten terms on the Commission (1969–1990), four of those terms (six years) as its Chairman.

In 1970, one of Denver’s landmarks, the Molly Brown House, was threatened with demolition. White headed the efforts to preserve the mansion. This movement led to the formation of Historic Denver, Inc., of which he was a founding board member. He served as advisor and mentor, and dedicated many years of service to committees, boards and commissions to identify, evaluate, and protect historic and archeological resources.

White made major contributions while serving on the Board of Directors of the Colorado Historical Foundation, Historic Denver, Inc., Four Mile Historic Park, Little Kingdom Foundation (preservation planners for Colorado’s oldest, best preserved mining district), Central City Opera Association (owner of Central City’s most important landmark structures), and other prominent civic groups. On May 18, 2010, White was honored with the Dana Crawford Award for Excellence in Historic Preservation by Colorado Preservation, Inc.

== Jack Kerouac and the Beats ==
During his undergraduate studies at Columbia University, White established a lifelong friendship with Jack Kerouac. In the fall of 1946, Kerouac and White began their friendship in New York. That same fall, the friend who introduced them, Hal Chase, struck up an acquaintance with Neal Cassady, a Denver street urchin whom Brierly had mentored and encouraged to head to New York with the hope of enrolling at Columbia. Cassady was just the hero Kerouac needed for his novels, and he soon latched himself to his character. To welcome Cassady and his 19-year-old bride Luanne to New York, Chase met him at the Greyhound bus station with Kerouac. They found housing for the kid with the help of Allan Temko and his cousin. Their apartment soon became a hub for the developing Beats. White appears in Kerouac's On the Road as the character Tim Gray; in Visions of Cody as Ed Gray; and in Book of Dreams as Al Green and Guy Green.

Kerouac and White's correspondence continued after he left Denver, and soon the two encouraged each other to go to Paris on the GI Bill of Rights. White, along with Frank Jeffries, enrolled at the Sorbonne in 1948. The duo tried to sneak Kerouac aboard the Queen Mary cruise ship, but he was discovered before leaving port and escorted back to land. White is credited with suggesting that Kerouac try, "sketching with words rather than writing conventionally," in 1951. White was also a longtime friend of Columbia University classmate Allan Temko, a Pulitzer Prize winning architecture critic for the San Francisco Chronicle who died in 2006, and Columbia University classmate Allen Ginsberg.
