= Charles Sink =

American architect

Charles Stanley Sink FAIA
- Born: May 24, 1923; Valparaiso, Indiana
- Died: April 12, 2013 (aged 89); Denver, Colorado
- Education: University of Pennsylvania; Harvard Graduate School of Design (BArch) (MArch)
- Occupation: Architect
- Spouse: Ann White (née Breese) (m. 1948 div. 1969)
- Children: Mark Sink, Carol Patterson, Jenny Freeman
- Practice: Sink Combs Dethlefs (Perkins&Will)
- Buildings: One Cheesman Place, McNichols Sports Arena, SAP Center

Charles "Chuck" Stanley Sink (May 24, 1923 – April 12, 2013) was an American architect and designer. He is widely credited for his influence on the development and design of Denver, Colorado's modernist skyline in the 1960s and 70s. Sink had a hand in the design of approximately 250 constructions across Colorado. He was recognized as a fellow by the American Institute of Architects and served as the Colorado chapter's president in 1972 and as chairman of the AIA Western Conference in 1978. Sink was a friend and frequent collaborator of I.M. Pei and directed various architectural firms in Denver over the course of his career. He was the principal designer of One Cheesman Place, a landmark project in Denver widely considered to be one of the city's first and most notable modernist constructions.

== Formative years: education and enlistment (1941–1947) ==
Sink was born and raised in Valparaiso, Indiana. his interest in architecture and design has been credited to experiences had in his adolescence. The Chicago World's Fair, encounters with László Moholy-Nagy's art, and visits to Frank Lloyd Wright's residences impressed the young Sink strongly.

Sink was admitted to the University of Pennsylvania's architecture program in 1941. He transferred to Harvard in 1942 after completing a two-year degree equivalency at UPenn. He elected to take 25 credit hours a semester in order to complete his equivalency in case he received orders from the Eighth Air Force.

At Harvard, Sink studied under Walter Gropius, who also supervised I.M Pei. Sink and Pei would eventually become acquainted, there beginning a multi-decade long friendship with frequent collaboration on public projects in and around Denver.

=== Military service (1942–1944) ===
Sink volunteered to join the Army Air Forces Training Command in 1942. Determined to serve and dissatisfied with life and academia in Pennsylvania, Sink eagerly awaited orders, frequently visiting his local recruiting office to realize his efforts. His orders finally arrived within weeks of his relocation to Cambridge. In February 1943, Sink was dispatched to Langley Field for training. Sink was deployed overseas in January 1944. He would be stationed in Europe from March until August 1944.

Sink completed a 1944 tour as a B-24 copilot, lead crewmember, and lead pilot. He attained the rank of First Lieutenant and was awarded the Distinguished Flying Cross and the Air Medal. His activity was concentrated purely on the Western Front. Sink published a memoir titled The 1944 Journals of Charles S. Sink in 1990.

== Career (1947–1993) ==
Sink was engaged with hundreds of projects across Colorado, having a hand in a designs that would come to define the Denver skyline for decades. Sink was regularly contracted for the design of private residences both in the Front Range and eastern Rockies in his later career. Sink notably designed Vail's clocktower as well as various condominiums in and around Copper Mountain (principally Summit House East).

Sink moved to Denver in 1950 after completing projects in Los Alamos, New Mexico and Caracas, Venezuela. In 1956, Sink would open Sink & Associates, which would later become Sink Combs Dethlefs (now Perkins&Will, an international sports stadium design firm). Sink habitually collaborated with local architects.

Following Pei's recommendation, Sink was appointed architect on the Zeckendorf Plaza project, one of the nation's first mixed-use developments. He would travel to New York in 1955 to work under Pei's supervision.

=== One Cheesman Place (1969) ===
Sink was contracted to design an ambitious high-density residential building at the northern crown of Cheesman Park. Sink intended the building to be as amicable to its environment as possible, as to ultimately not impinge upon the cultivated and otherwise natural beauty of the park below. Contemporary opinions of One Cheesman Place were high, with many lauding the functional, human design, with analogies made to sculpture and artistic sensibilities in general.

=== McNichols Sports Arena (1975) ===
At the recommendation of Pei, Sink was tapped by Unimark's Massimo Vignelli to design the 1976 Winter Olympics stadium in Denver. While the city would ultimately elect to reject hosting the winter Olympics, Sink's vision was still realized as an indoor sports stadium located next to Coors Field. Sink's design for what came to be known as the McNichols sports arena was considered a departure from his typical aesthetic. Sink designed the arena as to be built "almost anywhere and independent of a specific location."

Sink intended the arena to be as much a public celebration of live sports as possible. The interior was exceptionally economical: Sink prioritized high-volume seating in lieu of maximizing space for private boxes and booths. Sink was celebrated for overseeing the constructions under-budget and under-time completion. The stadium would be demolished in 2000.

=== Private residences ===
Sink was commissioned to design private residences across the country. He designed every home he and his family lived in until he established his own residency in One Cheesman Place in the 1990s. Of particular note is Sink's infamous hyper-minimalist construction dubbed "The Continuous Wall" by Italian architecture magazine "Domus". Featuring virtually no exterior windows, the home served essentially as a fortress to an expansive courtyard in the center.

Sink was recognized by The New York Times for his design of a prefabricated Aspen Ski house. Sink's design embraced the extreme environment in which the construction found itself in. Sink opted to "mold" the home to the environment, rather than bulldoze and clearcut the hillside. Adjusted for inflation, the home cost $112,909.98, or $10,800 in 1964.

=== Later career: 1980s and onwards ===
Sink remained a prominent architect in the Denver Metro Area until the early 2000s. Sink was responsible for the design of various DTC and Centennial corporate campuses.

Sink (as a senior partner of Sink Combs Dethlefs) was commissioned to design the San Jose arena in the early 1990s. The arena would stand as Sink's last major project in general.

=== Architectural philosophy ===
Sink was greatly inspired by contemporaries Ludwig Mies van der Rohe and Le Corbusier.

Sink appealed to minimalism and natural environments as a source of inspiration for the breadth of his career. Many of Sink's designs were intended to yield to their surroundings, if not enhance them in some respect. Sink's commitment to minimalism resulted in some controversy, especially regarding his construction of a private residence that had virtually no exterior windows. Sink's interpretation of organic architecture also influenced the interiors—furnishings and design in general—of his work. Airy interior courtyards and expansive atriums often appeared in Sink's later designs. Sink was an early proponent of solar power and passive heating.

== Personal life ==
Sink married Ann Breese in 1948. The couple had three children: Carol Patterson, Mark Sink and Jennifer Freeman. Sink was an active member of the Denver Art Commission and served as its chairman on at least one occasion. Sink also served on various architectural/design committees in the region. He was a prominent (if not founding) member of Rocky Mountain rally subculture and participated in various races, winning numerous awards. Sink was elected the Colorado SCCA executive prior to 1959.

Sink died on April 12, 2013. He was 89 years old.

== Selected works ==
Charles Sink Architectural Projects
Year	Project name	Location	Image
1950	Andrews Black Residence	4700 S. Dahlia Street, Arapahoe County	
1953	Sink Residence	1000 E. Stanford Avenue, Englewood, CO	
1955	Zeckendorf Plaza	10 W. 14th Ave. Pkwy. Denver, CO (with Pei)	
1964	Colorado Game, Fish & Parks Dept. Headquarters Remodeling	Colorado	
1964	Mesa College Library	Grand Junction, CO	
1965	J. Scott Prefab Vacation House	Colorado	
1965	McBride Vail Clock Tower Building	Vail, CO	
1966	Republic National Bank	Englewood, CO	
1968	One Cheesman Place	Denver, CO	
1968	1st Commercial Building	Cherry Creek, CO	
1968	Jane Dobbins Pies (Unimark International)	Pasadena, CA	
1969	BMC Showroom, NY (Unimark International)	New York	
1969	Cherry Creek Office Building	3003 E. 3rd, Denver, CO	
1969	Vail/Lions Head Centre	Vail, CO	
1969	Parks Restaurant & Gondola Ski Shop	Vail, CO	
1970	Great Western United Office (Unimark International)	Denver, CO	
1970	Reliable Parking Garage	1735 Stout, Denver, CO	
1970	Health Facilities Building	Denver, CO	
1970	Cheesman 2	Denver, CO	
1970	Terrace House Condominiums	Snowmass, CO	
1970	Aycrigg Residence	4950 S. El Camino Drive, Littleton, Arapahoe County	
1971	Copper Mountain Restaurant	Copper Mountain, CO	
1971	Copper Mountain Day Center	Copper Mountain, CO	
1972	Charles Sink Residence	4300 E. Mansfield Avenue, Cherry Hills, CO	
1972	Summit House Condominium	Copper Mountain, CO	
1972	Medical Office Building and Parking Garage	Denver, CO	
1972	Summit House East	Copper Mountain, CO	
1974	McNichols Sports Arena	Denver, CO	
1974	University of Colorado	Colorado Springs, CO	
1975	Beaver's Condominium/Beaver Village	Winter Park, CO	
1975	Skyland Park Pool Remodel	Denver, CO	
1975	RTD Platte Bus Maintenance Facility	31st and Ringsby Court, Denver, CO	
1975	Auraria Science Building	Denver, CO	
1976	Ted Strauss Tennis Court	Colorado	
1977	Winnipeg Sports Arena	Winnipeg, Manitoba	
1977	RTD Alameda Bus Maintenance Facility Remodel	Denver, CO	
1977	Corbin Retail Store	Evergreen, CO	
1977	Caswell Silver Residence	N.E. Corner Ellsworth and Dahlia, Denver, CO	
1978	Denver Federal Center Remodel	Building 40, Denver, CO	
1978	Dakota Hill Project	Grape Street and Dakota Ave, Denver, CO	
1978	Gunnison County Courthouse	Gunnison, CO	
1978	Goemex SOCO Plaza	Denver, CO	
1978	The Ridges (with Don Fleisher)	Grand Junction, CO	
1978	Entrada Housing (with Don Fleisher)	Grand Junction, CO	
1978	Xerox Inverness Office Building	Inverness, CO	
1978	Mountain States Employers Council	Colorado	
1978	UNLV Sports Arena	Las Vegas, NV	
1979	Summerville Housing (with Don Fleisher)	Grand Junction, CO	
1979	Motorola Building	Inverness, CO	
1980	183 Inverness Drive	Inverness, CO	
1980	The Ridges Housing	Grand Junction, CO	
1981	1900 Grant Office Building	1900 Grant St, Denver, CO	
1981	St. Mary's Parish Project	6th & Grant, Denver, CO	
1982	Hamilton Trade Centre/Sports Arena	Ontario, Canada	
1986	Sink Residence	1050 S. Franklin Street, Denver, CO	
1993	San Jose Arena	525 West Santa Clara St. San Jose, CA	
