= SAP Center =

Indoor arena in San Jose, California, U.S.

SAP Center at San Jose
- The Shark Tank

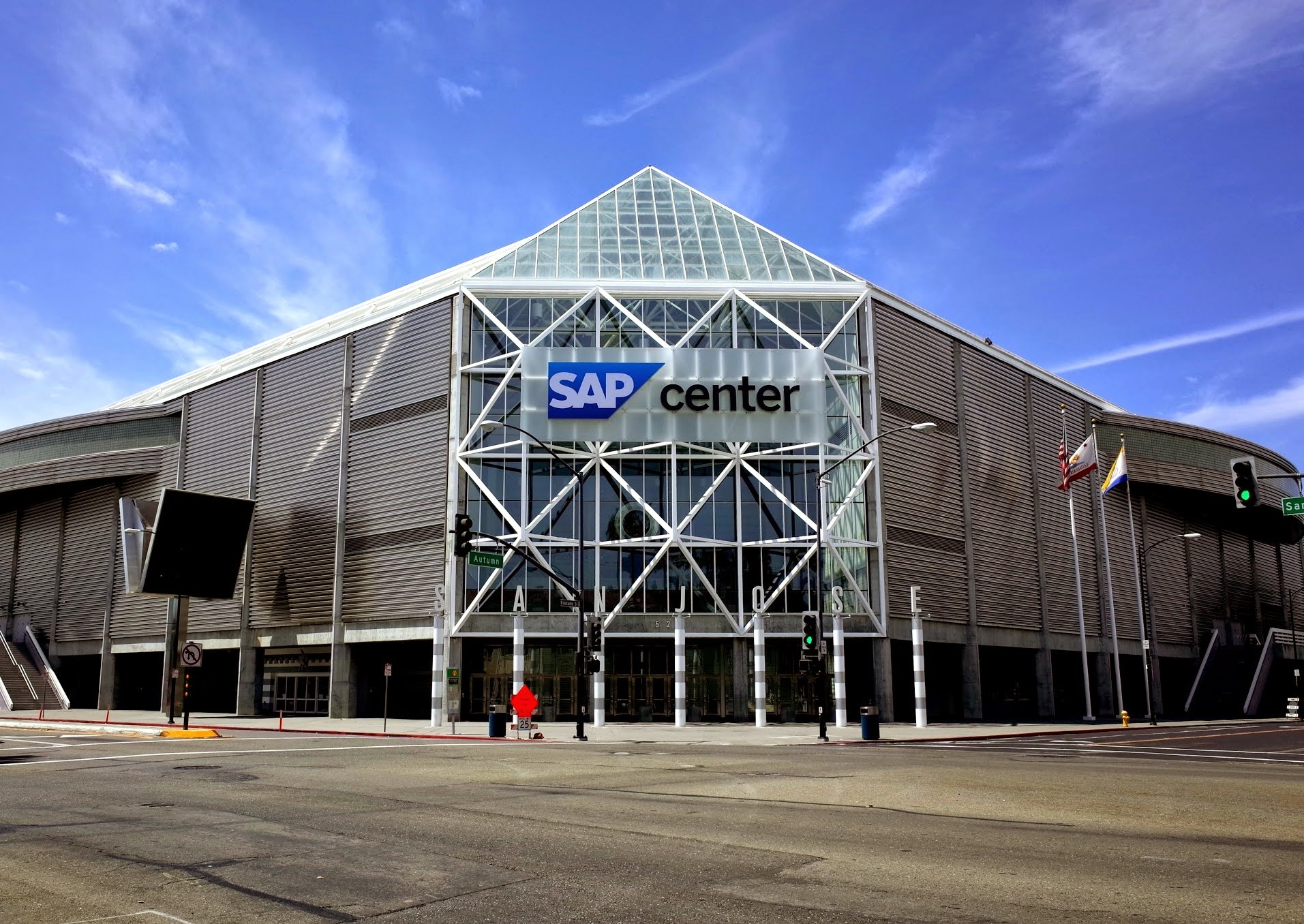
- SAP Center in 2014

- Location in San Jose Location in California Location in the United States
- Former names: San Jose Arena (1993–2001); Compaq Center (2001–2002); HP Pavilion (2002–2013)
- Address: 525 West Santa Clara Street
- Location: San Jose, California, U.S.
- Coordinates: 37°19′58″N 121°54′4″W
- Owner: City of San Jose
- Operator: San Jose Sports & Entertainment Enterprises
- Capacity: Concerts: 19,190; Basketball: 18,543; Wrestling: 18,300; Ice hockey: 17,562 (2001–2023); 17,435 (2023–present); Tennis: 11,386
- Field size: 450,000 sq ft (42,000 m^{2})
- Public transit: San Jose Diridon; San Fernando

Construction
- Groundbreaking: June 28, 1990
- Opened: September 7, 1993
- Cost: $162.5 million ($400 million in 2025 dollars)
- Architects: Sink Combs Dethlefs; Prodis Associates
- Project manager: HuntCor
- Structural engineers: Martin/Martin, Inc.
- Services engineers: M-E Engineers, Inc.
- General contractor: Perini Building Company

Tenants
- San Jose Sharks (NHL) (1993–present); San Jose Grizzlies (CISL) (1994–1995); San Jose Rhinos (RHI) (1994–1997, 1999); San Jose SaberCats (AFL) (1995–2008, 2011–2015); Golden State Warriors (NBA) (1996–1997); San Jose Lasers (ABL) (1996–1998); San Jose Stealth (NLL) (2004–2009); San Jose Barracuda (AHL) (2015–2022); Bay Area Panthers (IFL) (2022–2025); San Jose Sea Lions (PWHL) (2026–)

Website
- sapcenter.com

SAP Center at San Jose (originally known as San Jose Arena) is a multi-purpose indoor arena located in San Jose, California. Its primary tenant is the San Jose Sharks of the National Hockey League, for which the arena has earned the nickname The Shark Tank.

== History ==
Plans for a San Jose arena began in the mid-1980s, when a group of local citizens formed Fund Arena Now (FAN). The group contacted city officials and pursued potential sponsors and partners from the NHL and NBA. In the late 1980s, mayor Tom McEnery met with FAN, and subsequently a measure to allocate local taxes for arena construction came up for a public vote on June 7, 1988, passing by a narrow margin.

The arena was principally designed by Denver architect Charles Sink, a senior partner of Sink Combs Dethlefs.

In 1991, soon after construction began, the NHL granted an expansion franchise to San Jose. After it was discovered that the arena would not be suitable for NBA or NHL use as originally designed, the Sharks requested an upgrade to NHL standards, including the addition of luxury suites, a press box, and increased seating capacity.

In 1993, the arena was completed and initially named the "San Jose Arena".

For the 1996–97 NBA season, the arena served as home to the Golden State Warriors while their regular home court in Oakland (now known as Oakland Arena) was under renovation.

In 2001, naming rights were sold to Compaq, and it was renamed "Compaq Center at San Jose" (not to be confused with the Compaq Center (formerly The Summit) in Houston, Texas). After HP purchased Compaq in 2002, the arena was renamed "HP Pavilion", the same name as one of its computer models.

In late April 2007, it was announced that the HP Pavilion at San Jose would be receiving several building improvements, including a new center-hung LED video display system from Daktronics similar to that of the TD Garden, home of the Boston Bruins of the NHL.

In June 2013, German software company SAP (co-founded by Sharks managing partner Hasso Plattner, who is also SAP's chairman of the board) purchased the naming rights to the facility in a five-year deal worth US$3.35 million per year. The arena was renamed "SAP Center at San Jose" upon approval by the San Jose City Council.

In September 2022, a new center-hung system from Daktronics that doubled the surface of the old video display system was debuted ahead of the 2022-23 NHL season. The four main LED displays measure approximately 23 feet high by 41 feet wide and the size of the 14 newly installed displays total at more than 9,300 square feet of surface area.

In April 2023, construction was announced on a new 10,000-square-foot penthouse lounge, with seven suites and three rows of regular seating being converted to accommodate the project. With the new premium seating completed, the arena's total attendance capacity for hockey games changed from 17,562 to 17,435.

In August 2025, it was announced that the Sharks would sign an extension keeping them at the arena until 2051, with several upgrades planned for the arena totalling $425 million. The upgrades would include improvements to the arena's elevators, restrooms, plumbing, Wi-Fi network, sound system, electrical, fire protection system, and emergency generators, as well as a revamp of the concourse, penthouse, club levels, and locker rooms. Further upgrades announced in February 2026 include an expansion to the team store, an increase in lower bowl seating, outdoor concourse-connected spaces, new openings into the seating bowl, and an overhaul of each level and suites in the arena.

== Events ==
In 2006, SAP Center sold the most tickets (633,435) to non-sporting events of any venue in the Western United States, and the fourth highest total in the world, after Madison Square Garden in New York City (US), the Manchester Arena in Manchester (UK), and Scotiabank Arena in Toronto (Canada).

Other events hosted at the arena include the 1996 United States Figure Skating Championships, the 47th National Hockey League All-Star Game in 1997, the 1999 NCAA Women's Final Four, ArenaBowl XVI in 2002, the 2007 USA Gymnastics Visa Championships, and UFC 139 on November 19, 2011. Intel Extreme Masters Season IX – San Jose in 2014 and Intel Extreme Masters Season X – San Jose were held at the venue. Prior to Super Bowl 50 in nearby Santa Clara, the arena housed introductory media activities for the event. SAP Center hosted games 3, 4, and 6 of the 2016 Stanley Cup Finals in the Sharks' first appearance in franchise history, with the Cup being presented to the series-winning Pittsburgh Penguins after game 6. In 2012 and 2016, the arena played host to the USA Gymnastics Olympic Trials. The arena was the host to the West Regional semifinals and finals of the 2002, 2007, and 2017 NCAA men's basketball tournaments; as well as first- and second-round games of the 2010, 2013, and 2019 tournaments. The Golden State Valkyries of the WNBA played their first playoff game at the SAP Center on September 17, 2025 due to their normal home of Chase Center hosting the 2025 Laver Cup, where they lost 75–74 to the Minnesota Lynx in front of 18,543 fans.

Mixed Martial Arts events have played a big role at SAP Center. The MMA organization Strikeforce held many events in San Jose beginning with Strikeforce: Shamrock vs. Gracie in 2006, then Strikeforce: Carano vs. Cyborg in 2009, through 2012 with Strikeforce: Barnett vs. Cormier. The first Bellator MMA organization event at SAP was Bellator MMA & Glory: Dynamite 1 in September 2015 and since has held 6 total events with the most recent being Bellator 199 on May 16, 2018. SAP Center has also been the host of premiere MMA promotion the UFC. The first event was UFC 139 on November 19, 2011, then UFC on Fuel TV: Muñoz vs. Weidman on July 11, 2012, UFC on Fox: Henderson vs. Melendez on April 20, 2013, and most recently UFC on Fox: Lawler vs. Brown on July 26, 2014.

On September 18, 2016, the arena hosted the Kellogg's Tour of Gymnastics Champions.

The annual US Figure Skating Championships have been staged here in San Jose five times now — 1996, 2012, 2018, 2021 and 2023.

SAP Center has also hosted WWE Pay Per Views. Royal Rumble (1998), SummerSlam (2001), The Great American Bash (2007), Payback (2017) and TLC: Tables, Ladders & Chairs (2018) all took place at the venue. The venue hosted Forbidden Door (2026), its first All Elite Wrestling PPV event, on Sunday, June 28, 2026.

In 2026, it will host the CrossFit Games.

Beginning in 2026, SAP Center will be home to the San Jose Sea Lions of the Professional Women's Hockey League.

== Gallery ==
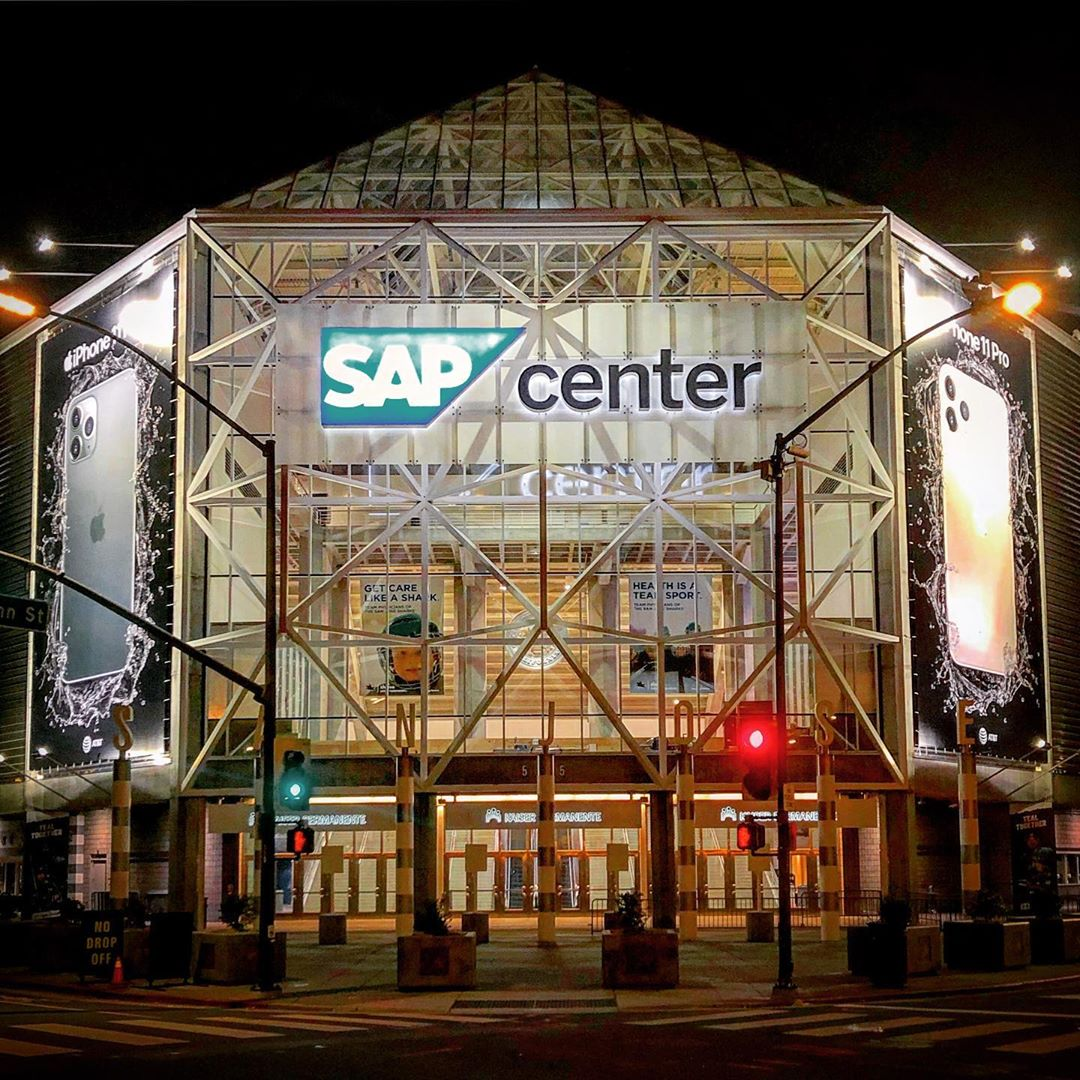
Nighttime view of SAP Center

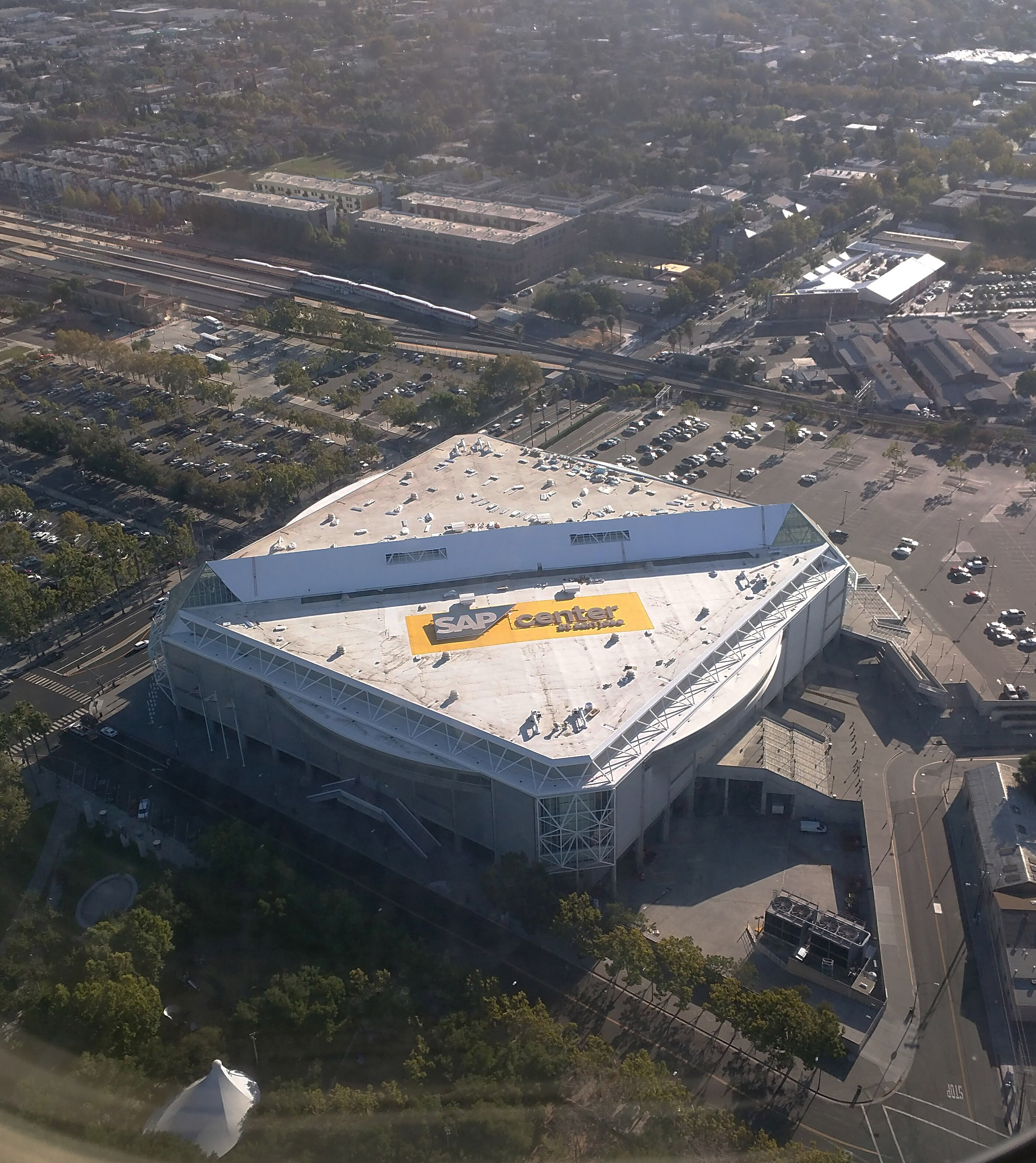
Aerial view of SAP Center from a landing at San Jose International Airport (SJC)

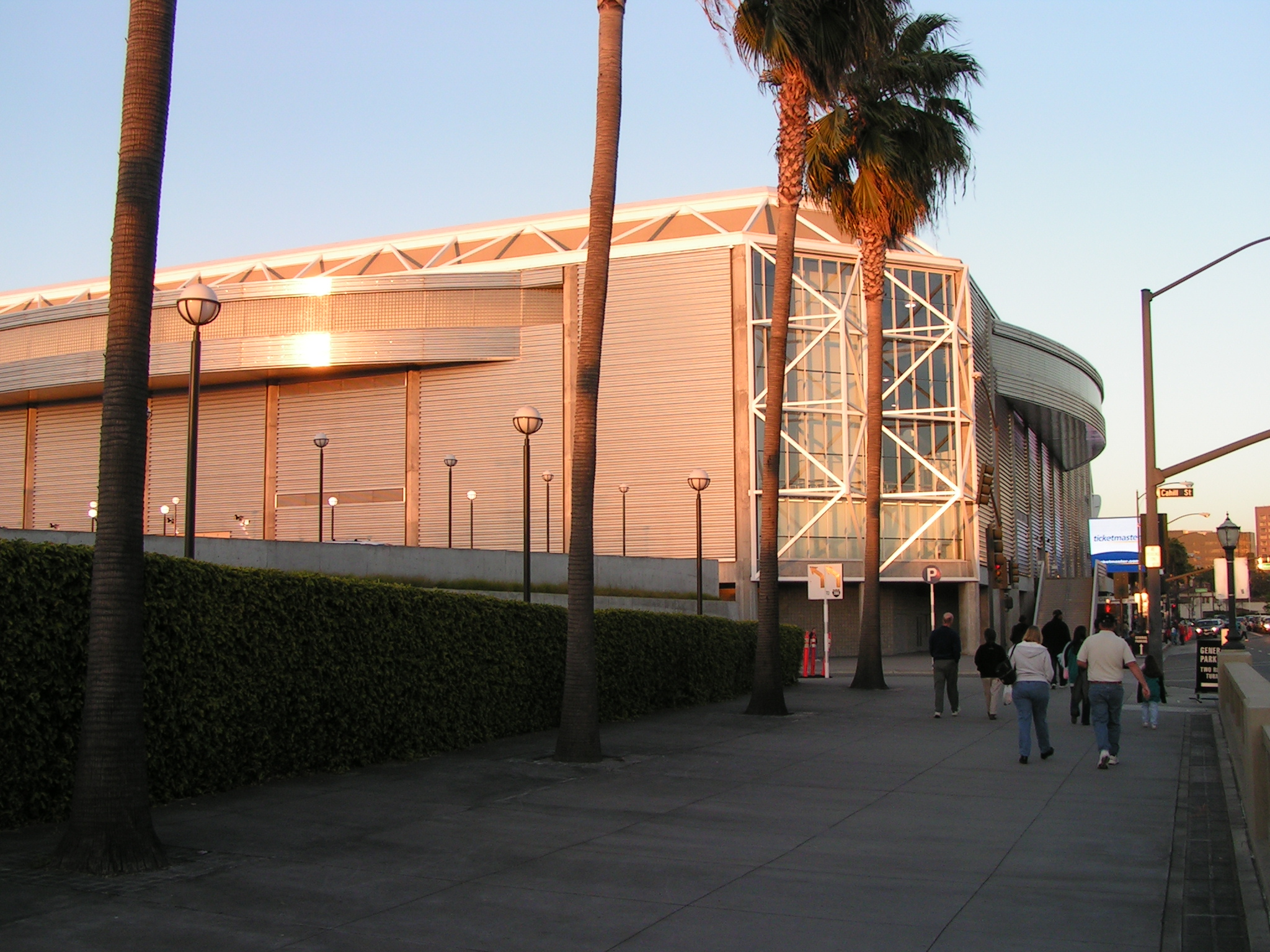
Side view of SAP Center

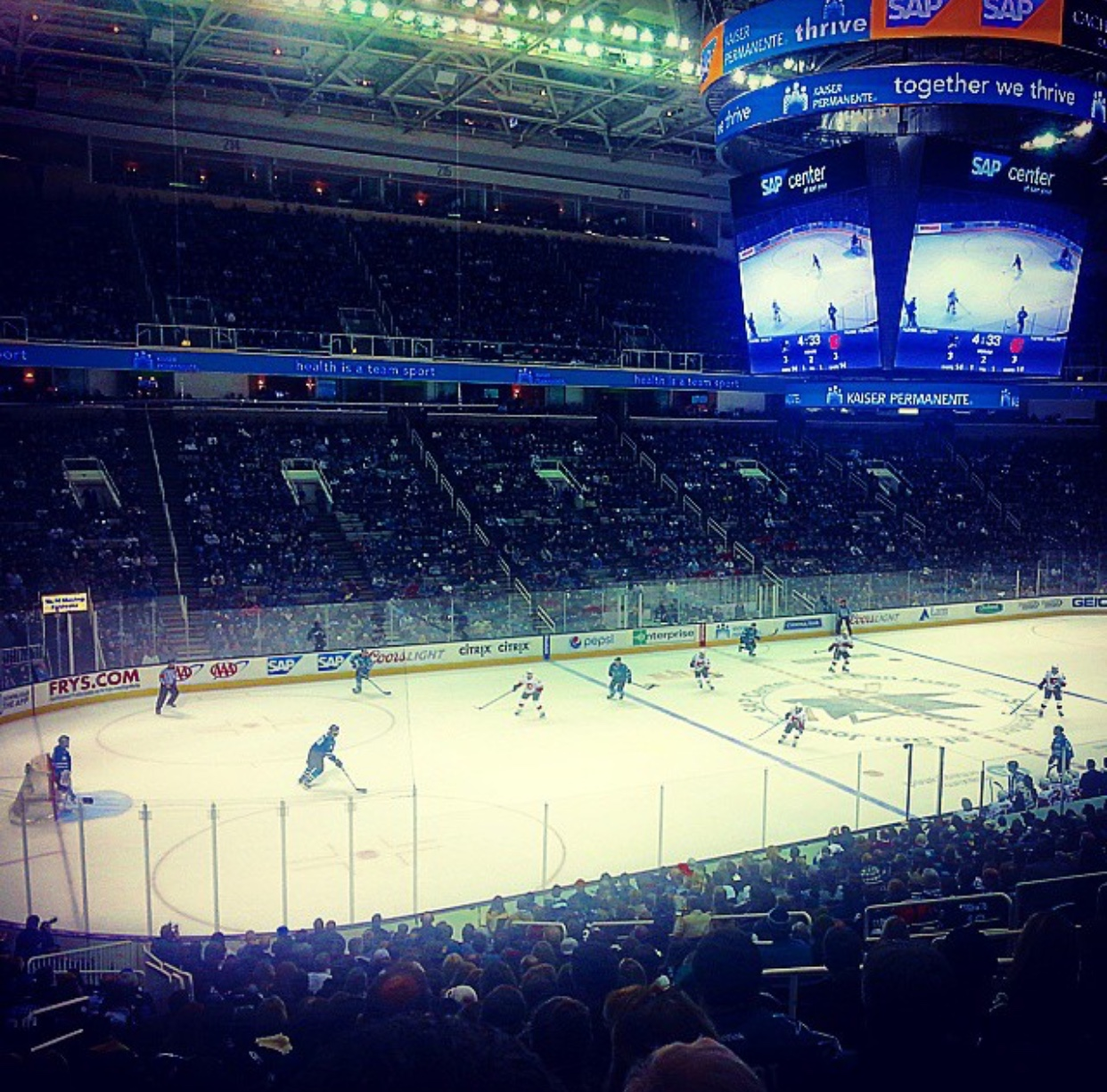
Inside view of SAP Center during a game between the San Jose Sharks and the Calgary Flames in January 2015

== See also ==
- List of indoor arenas by capacity

Events and tenants
Preceded by Cow Palace	Home of the San Jose Sharks; 1993 – present	Succeeded by current
Preceded by DCU Center (as the Worcester Sharks)	Home of the San Jose Barracuda; 2015 – 2022	Succeeded by Tech CU Arena
Preceded by Oakland–Alameda County Coliseum Arena	Home of the Golden State Warriors; 1996 – 1997	Succeeded by Oracle Arena
Preceded by Fleet Center; Amalie Arena	Host of the NHL All-Star Game; 1997; 2019	Succeeded by General Motors Place; Enterprise Center
