= Boettcher Foundation =

American nonprofit organization

- Formation: 1937
- Type: Philanthropic organization
- Headquarters: Denver, CO, United States
- Revenue: $23,474,733 (2014)
- Expenses: $13,999,437 (2014)
- Website: boettcherfoundation.org

The Boettcher Foundation is a Denver-based philanthropic organization whose mission is to invest in the promise of Colorado and the potential of Coloradans. Founded by Claude K. Boettcher and his son, Charles, with additional support from other family members, the foundation has invested more than $375 million in Colorado through scholarships, biomedical research funding and capital grants. The foundation has EIN 84-0404274 as a 501(c)(3) Private Nonoperating Foundation; in 2024 it claimed $24,008,406 in total revenue and $365,607,516 in total assets.

The Boettcher Foundation is best known for its scholarship program, which annually provides 42 of Colorado's top graduating seniors with funding to attend college in Colorado. Its Webb-Waring Biomedical Research Awards program provides early career biomedical researchers with funding to establish themselves and their research, making them competitive for federal and private funding. The foundation has also provided capital grants throughout the State of Colorado and supports leadership development at multiple levels.

The Boettcher name is well known in Colorado as recognized by many buildings and places named after the family thanks to the foundation's grants, including the Boettcher Concert Hall in Denver, the Boettcher Memorial Tropical Conservatory at the Denver Botanic Gardens, and the Boettcher Welcome Center at the Denver Zoo. In addition, the Colorado Governor's Residence, a Colonial Revival mansion built in 1908, was donated by the Boettcher Foundation to the State of Colorado in 1959.
