= Triangle: The Fire That Changed America =

Book

- Author: David Von Drehle
- Published: 2004, Grove Press
- Publication date: August 16, 2004
- ISBN: 9780802141514

Triangle: The Fire That Changed America a detailed account of the Triangle Shirtwaist Factory fire that occurred on March 25, 1911.

== Reception ==
The New York Times calls it "An enthralling chronicle".

Publishers Weekly states "Von Drehle's engrossing account, which emphasizes the humanity of the victims and the theme of social justice, brings one of the pivotal and most shocking episodes of American labor history to life".

Kirkus Reviews calls it "Compelling, in-depth look at a tragedy that deserves to be better remembered".
