= Museum of Contemporary Art Denver =

Museum in Colorado, US

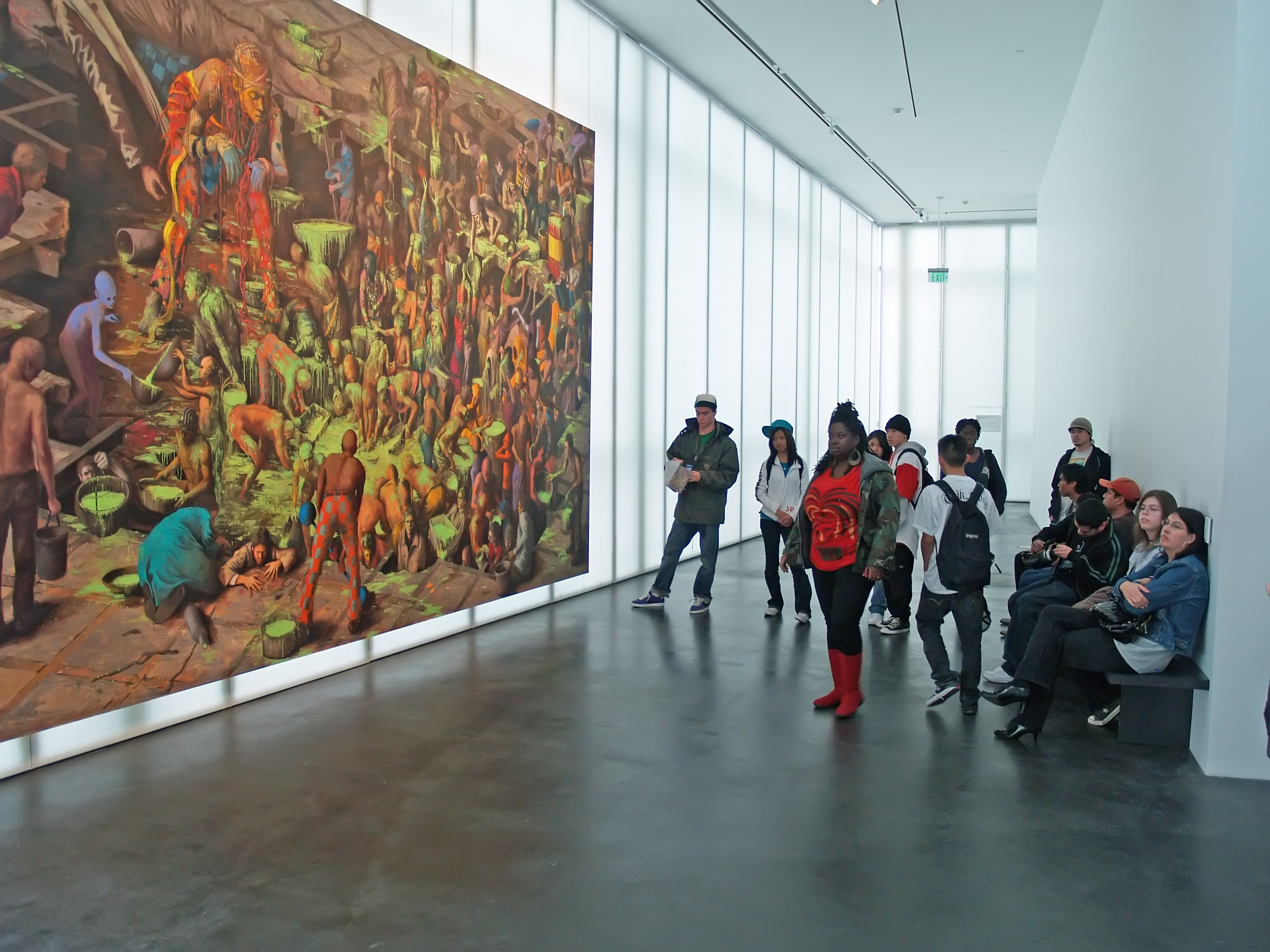
- Jonas Burgert's painting Second Day Nothing at the Denver Museum of Contemporary Art
- Established: 1996
- Location: 1485 Delgany Street; Denver, Colorado
- Coordinates: 39.7525°N 105.004°W
- Type: Contemporary art museum
- Website: mcadenver.org

The Museum of Contemporary Art (MCA Denver), in Denver, Colorado, was founded in 1996 as the first dedicated home for contemporary art in the city of Denver. For seven years, MCA Denver occupied a renovated fish market in Sakura Square in lower downtown Denver.

== History ==
MCA Denver was founded in 1996, when philanthropist Sue Cannon and a group of volunteers (such as Marina Graves, Mark Sink, Dale Chisman and Lawrence Argent) created the first dedicated home for contemporary art in the city of Denver. For seven years, MCA Denver occupied a renovated fish market in Sakura Square in lower downtown Denver.

In 2003, developer Mark Falcone and designer Ellen Bruss, members of MCA Denver's Board of Trustees, donated land in Denver's Platte Valley – which was later appraised at $1.5 million – to facilitate the building of a permanent building. The Board subsequently started an $18.6 million capital campaign in June 2005 and assembled a committee that gathered interest from 47 architects, selecting 6 finalists. In a public process, each architect was required to give a lecture to the community.

In October 2007, under the directorship of Cydney Payton, MCA Denver opened its new, 27,000-square foot, environmentally sustainable facility in lower downtown Denver designed by architect David Adjaye of Adjaye Associates (UK). The building, Adjaye's first museum commission, was designed to minimize boundaries between the exterior spaces of the city and the interior galleries of the museum. Hidden skylights fill the interior spaces with natural light, and large windows look out on the city streets. The building has five galleries as well as dedicated education spaces, a shop, library and rooftop cafe.

In March 2009, Adam Lerner was appointed as the director of MCA Denver. Lerner had previously been working at The Lab in Belmar, an institution that offered modern art as well as lectures and interactive activities. Upon Lerner's move to MCA Denver, the Boards of Trustees agreed to merge the two institutions.

In August 2019, Nora Burnett Abrams was appointed as the new Mark G. Falcone Director of MCA Denver.

== Collection ==
There is no permanent collection at MCA Denver. Exhibitions are on view for a period of 2–4 months, and are rotated about 3-4 times a year.

== Major exhibits ==
Some of the artists who have exhibited at MCA Denver include: Tatiana Blass, Brian Bress, Damien Hirst, Jonas Burgert, David Altmejd, Chris Ofili, Wangetchi Mutu, Lorraine O'Grady, Jane Hammond, Dana Schutz, Paul Sietsema, Mark Mothersbaugh, Tara Donovan, and others.

== Programs ==
The brainchild of Elissa Auther and Gillian Silverman — Feminism & CO at The Lab at Belmar — was incorporated into MCA Denver programming when the two organizations officially merged. As a program unique to MCA Denver, there are no other dedicated programs in any museum in the United States that specifically references the intersection of feminism and contemporary art.

== Management ==
=== Directors ===
- 2001–2009: Cydney Payton
- 2009–2019: Adam Lerner
- 2019–2025: Nora Burnett Abrams
- 2025–present: Anthony Kiendl

=== Board of trustees ===
MCA Denver is also managed by a Board of Trustees, which is currently chaired by Steve Cohen.
