= Boettcher Memorial Tropical Conservatory =

Coordinates: 39.7325°N 104.9610°W

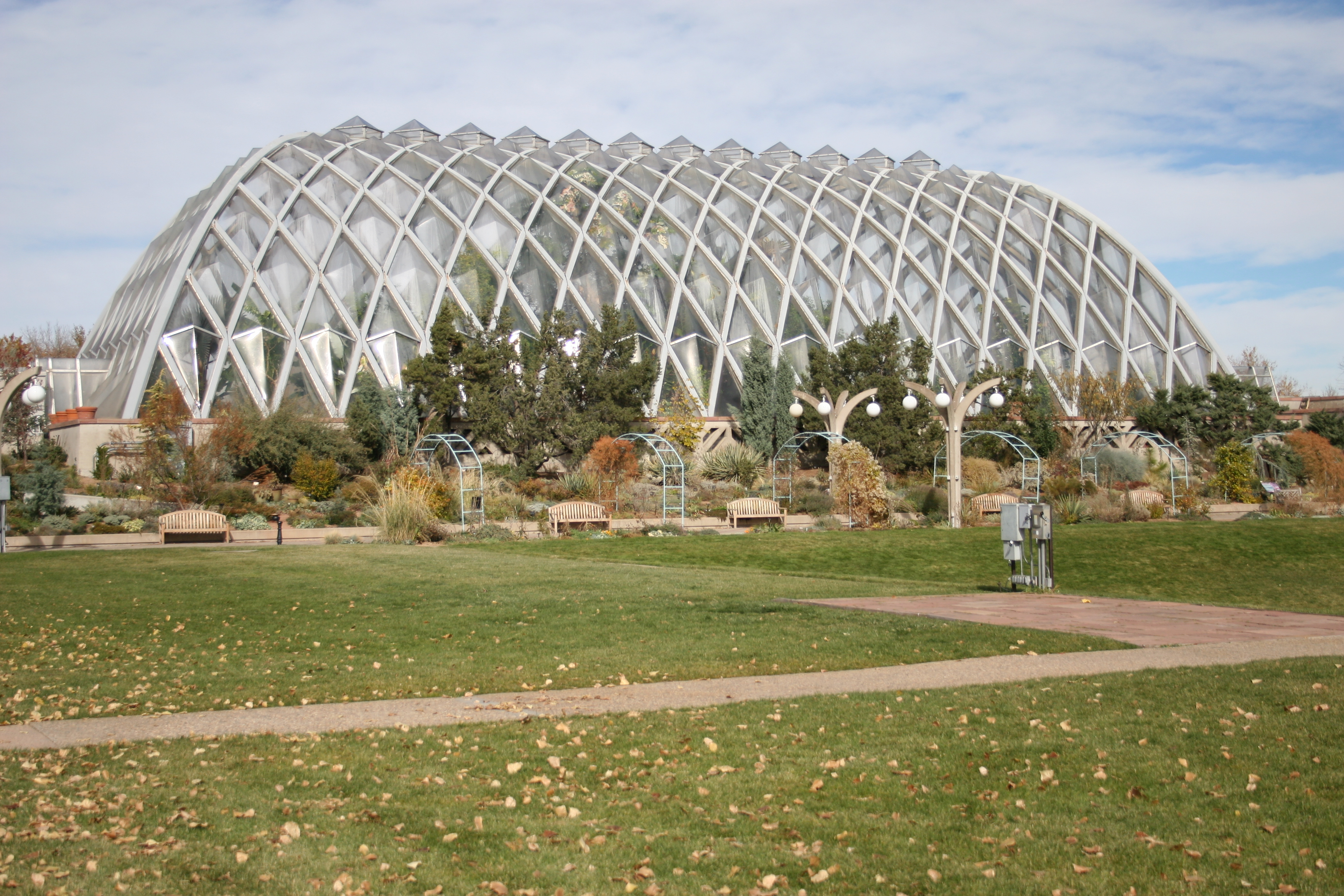
Boettcher Memorial Tropical Conservatory

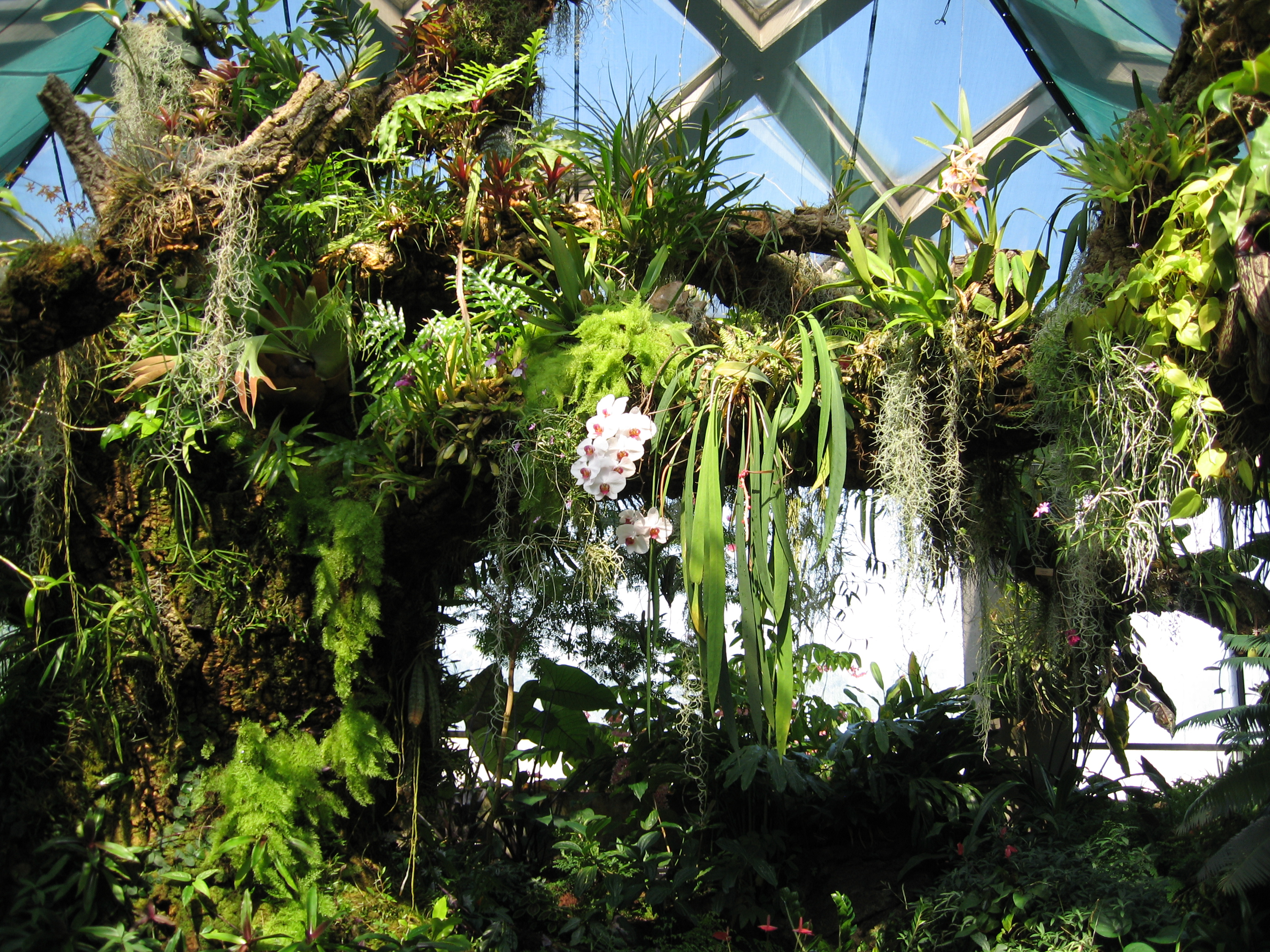
Orchid-covered tree in Boettcher Memorial Tropical Conservatory

The Boettcher Memorial Tropical Conservatory, located at Denver Botanic Gardens, is an iconic landmark in Denver, Colorado.

The tropical conservatory was designed in 1964 by Denver architects Victor Hornbein and Ed White Jr. and opened in 1966. Its structure consists of high, interlaced concrete arches inset with faceted Plexiglas panels, which suitably honor benefactor Claude Boettcher of the Ideal Cement Company. In 1973, it was awarded Denver Landmark status. The Boettcher Memorial Tropical Conservatory incorporates more than 11,000 sq. ft. of plants from tropical and subtropical regions, as well as a fabricated two-story banyan tree that offers a multi-layered view of the tropical forest.

== See also ==
- Denver Botanic Gardens
- List of botanical gardens in the United States
