= Jennifer Ash Rudick =

Jennifer Ash Rudick (born 16 January 1963) is an American journalist, best-selling author and Emmy-nominated documentary filmmaker.

== Early life and education ==
Born in Miami, Florida, and raised in Palm Beach, Rudick's father was Clarke Ash (1923 - 2011), the editor for The Miami News. Under his direction, the paper won three Pulitzer Prizes. Ash was also editor of the editorial page for the Palm Beach Post. He received an award for leadership and support from President Lyndon Johnson for his support of the passage of the Voting Rights Act of 1965 that prohibits racial discrimination in voting. Florida Governor, Claude Kirk cited Ash for his campaign to protect the Everglades and for the creation of the Biscayne National Monument.

Her mother, Agnes Ash, was the publisher of the Palm Beach Daily News. She won 12 newspaper awards, including the New York Women's award as editor of The New York Times. She was also a reporter for The Atlanta Journal-Constitution and was the first business editor for The Washington Post.

Rudick received a BA from Kenyon College and an MFA from the New School for Social Research.

== Career ==
She is the producer of the documentary Iris by Albert Maysles starring Iris Apfel. It premiered at the New York Film Festival in October 2014, and was subsequently acquired by Magnolia Pictures for US theatrical distribution in 2015. Following this, Iris ran on PBS's POV, for which it received an Emmy nomination. She also directed and produced the short documentary Diner en Blanc, which competed in national festivals and is now on iTunes.

With her son, art director Clarke Rudick, she is currently working on a hybrid film about Telfar Clemens and a documentary on artist, Marilyn Minter.

Rudick is the author of seven books: City of Angels, Houses of Los Angeles Summer to Summer (2020); Out East: Houses and Gardens of the Hamptons (2017); Palm Beach Chic (2016); Tropical Style: Private Palm Beach (1992). Her next book, Palm Beach Living, will be published in February 2023 by Vendome Press. Rudick's first book, The Expectant Father (1995), sold over 900,000 copies.

As a journalist, she has written for national publications, including Architectural Digest, The Washington Post and Forbes magazine. She was an editor at WWD/W, Town & Country and Veranda and is currently a contributor to Galerie Magazine.

Rudick is on the boards of The Kenyon Literary Review and The Maysles Documentary Center in Harlem.

== Personal life ==
She lives in New York City with her husband, ophthalmologist Dr. A. Joseph Rudick Jr. They have two children, Clarke and Amelia.
