= Marilyn Minter =

American visual artist (born 1948)

- Born: 1948 (age 77–78); Shreveport, Louisiana
- Known for: Photography, Painting
- Website: marilynminter.net

Marilyn Minter (born 1948) is an American visual artist who is perhaps best known for her sensual paintings and photographs done in the photorealism style that blurs the line between commercial and fine art. Minter currently teaches in the MFA department at the School of Visual Arts in New York City.

== Early life and education ==
Minter was born in Shreveport, Louisiana, in 1948. She was raised in Florida.

In 1970 she attained a BFA from the University of Florida in Gainesville. In 1972 she received an MFA in painting from Syracuse University.

== Style ==
Minter's process begins by staging photoshoots of her subjects behind glass, which is manipulated with steam and frost. Photos from the shoot are then photoshopped to create an entirely new image. This new image is then turned into paintings created through the layering of enamel paint. Paint is applied with brushes and often melded in by tapping it in with fingertips. This creates a softness and atmosphere that has become a signature style of Minter work.

== Career ==
Minter's career began while she was a student at the University of Florida, where she created a series of photographic studies involving her drug-addicted mother. Diane Arbus, who was a visiting artist at the time, was shown Minter's work and encouraged her work. Minter later moved to New York City in 1976, after earning a Master of Fine Arts degree at Syracuse University, and began collaborating with the German expressionist painter Christof Kohlhofer. Through the 1980s, she explored Pop-derived pictures, setting the tone for many of her works. Although their joint work gained critical acclaim, when their 1984 and 1986 shows at the Gracie Mansion gallery were not commercially successful, Kohlhofer and Minter parted ways.

Though she has always explored the role of the female subject, and how they are portrayed culturally in her work, in 1989 Minter debuted Porn Grid, a series of 4 panels each showcasing men and women performing fellatio. The panels are painted in ben-day style dots, with imagery largely obtained from "men's magazines." The feminist community did not embrace her work. She was initially accused of being in collusion with the porn industry when in fact, Minter was pushing the boundaries of the kind of work women artists could create. Minter told Artforum in 2015 "I was shocked by the negative reaction to those works at the time. I was accused of being complicit in sexism and was stunned by the idea that a woman owning sexual imagery could be taken so negatively." Minter is quick to point out that sexually provocative imagery carries negative blowback for young women artists in particular. "If you’re a young woman artist and you’re working with sexual imagery, it makes people crazy. But they’ll love it if you’re old."

In 1990, Minter produced her first video, 100 Food Porn, shot and directed by documentary filmmaker Ted Haimes. The video portrays Minter in her studio painting the 100 Food Porn series, paintings all depicting close ups of food preparation with sexual overtones. The video was used as a television advertisement to promote her exhibition of the same name at the Simon Watson Gallery in New York. She used the gallery's print advertising budget for the show to buy three 30 second ad slots during Late Night with David Letterman, The Arsenio Hall Show, and Nightline in lieu of traditional print advertising; becoming the first artist to advertise an exhibition on late night television. Through the 1990s she refined her works. While still having popular cultural undertones, they began to exude a sense of glamour and high-fashion. In 1998, Minter received a prestigious Guggenheim Fellowship for Fine Arts.

In 2003, she was in the exhibition 4 Walls, 8 Views at the Arena Gallery founded by Art curator Renee Riccardo in New York, NY. In 2005 Minter had a solo exhibition, titled New Work: Marilyn Minter, at the San Francisco Museum of Modern Art, focused on hyperrealistic close-ups of seemingly glamorous images, including makeup-laden lips, eyes, and toes. The following year Minter was featured in the Whitney Biennial; and in a partnership with Creative Time, was given ad space on four billboards in Manhattan's Chelsea district. The billboards presented photographs of high heels kicking around in muddy water, and stayed up for months.

Minter's first monograph was published in 2007. The book involved a heavy gloss, multi-colored paper making it feel almost wet, setting the book apart. This same year, she had shows in Sweden, the U.K., Spain, and France. In 2007, Minter also produced a series of photographs of the actress Pamela Anderson, commissioned by the art quarterly Parkett.

In 2008, Minter collaborated with international skate/street wear brand Supreme to produce three limited edition skate decks. In 2009 she produced the video Green Pink Caviar. Lush and sensual, the video depicts a series of tongues, covered in candy, that "paint" across a glass surface. The video was later shown in Times Square in New York City and Sunset Boulevard in Los Angeles. Excerpts of the video were used as the backdrop for the opening song in Madonna's Sticky & Sweet Tour. In 2010 the video was exhibited at the Museum of Modern Art.

In 2014, Fulton Ryder (Richard Prince's publishing press) published a 500 limited edition book called PLUSH, which is compiled of 70 photographs of female pubic hair. In April 2015 her first major retrospective titled Marilyn Minter: Pretty/Dirty opened at the Contemporary Arts Museum Houston. The exhibition was made up of paintings, photographs, and video works spanning Minter's career; between 1976 and 2013. Some notable early works featured in the show were Little Girls #1 and Big Girls from her series Big Girls/Little Girls. The retrospective was the first time all of these pieces of work were seen together in one museum. The exhibit was co-curated by Bill Arning and Elissa Auther. The show travelled to the Museum of Contemporary Art, Denver, Orange County Museum of Art, and concluded its run at the Brooklyn Museum in 2017. While at the Brooklyn Museum, the show coincided with: 'A Year of Yes: Reimagining Feminism at the Brooklyn Museum', a series of exhibitions and public programs presenting various perspectives on the history of feminism and feminist art, celebrating the 10th anniversary of the Elizabeth A. Sackler Center for Feminist Art.

In 2018 Minter collaborated with For Freedoms, an artist-run platform for civic engagement, to create a billboard poster for the 50 State Initiative, a major billboard campaign that aims to encourage political participation and voting. Displayed in Little Rock, Arkansas, Minter's billboard with the word “sad!” using her frosted glass technique. Minter intended for her billboard to criticize Donald Trump, stating, "I couldn’t be political, but I would have been really aggressive if I could...This is as mild as I could get. Taking one of his signature words and trying to re-purpose it into a really sad-looking word."

The 50 State Initiative was deeply personal to Minter. She stated, “I think it’s important for everyone to get involved, not just artists. If you’re not upset, you’re not awake... I just can’t tolerate injustice, but who can? I just don’t ignore it, and that’s really it.”

Minter's work was included in the 2022 exhibition Women Painting Women at the Modern Art Museum of Fort Worth. Recent shows include solo shows at Lehmann Maupin, Seoul, 2024, LDGR, New York in 2023, Montpellier Contemporain, Montpelier, France 2021, and MoCA Westport, Westport CT, 2021.

Minter is the subject of the 2025 documentary film Pretty Dirty: The Life and Times of Marilyn Minter.

== Recognition ==
- 2026 – Anderson Ranch’s International Artist Award

== Select exhibitions ==
Minter has been the subject of numerous solo exhibitions, including:

- New Work: Marilyn Minter, San Francisco Museum of Modern Art (2005)
- Marilyn Minter: Chewing Color, Contemporary Arts Center, Cincinnati (2009)
- Marilyn Minter, Deichtorhallen (2010)
- Marilyn Minter: Orange Crush, Museum of Contemporary Art Cleveland (2010)
- Marilyn Minter: Pretty/Dirty, Contemporary Arts Museum Houston (2015), Museum of Contemporary Art, Denver (2015), Orange County Museum of Art (2016), Brooklyn Museum (2017)
- Marilyn Minter: Nasty Women, Savannah College of Art and Design Museum of Art (2020)
- Smash, MoCA, Westport (2012)
- All Wet, Montpellier Contemporain (2021)

== Art market ==
Minter is represented by the following galleries: Salon 94 in New York, Regen Projects in Los Angeles, Lehmann Maupin in Asia, Gavlak Gallery in Palm Beach, and Baldwin Gallery in Aspen.

== Bibliography ==
- Marilyn Minter, Gregory R. Miller & Co., 2007 ISBN 978-0-9743648-6-5
- Plush, Fulton Ryder Press, 2014 ISBN 9780991572342
- Marilyn Minter: Pretty/Dirty, 2015 ISBN 978-1941366042
- Marilyn Minter: All Wet, JBE Books, 2021 ISBN 978-2-36568-042-4
