= Elissa Auther =

Curator

Academic background
- Education: University of Maryland at College Park
- Thesis: Gustave Courbet's Sleep : paresse et luxure and the threat of tribadism in mid-nineteenth century France (1993)

Elisa Auther is the Mildred Lasdon Chief Curator at the Museum of Arts and Design in New York City.

== Education ==
Auther received her B.A. from San Francisco State University, and her Ph.D. in History of Art from the University of Maryland, College Park.

== Career ==
Auther was at the University of Colorado where she was an associate professor of contemporary art and director of the art history and museum studies program from 2003– 2014. In 2014 she moved to the Museum of Contemporary Art Denver. In 2019 Auther was named deputy director of Curatorial Affairs and the William and Mildred Lasdon Chief Curator at the Museum of Arts and Design.

== Work ==
Her book "String, Felt, Thread: The Hierarchy of Art and Craft in American Art" (University of Minnesota Press, 2010) was known for its revisionist history in re-contextualizing craft in recent contemporary art. Auther co-curated with Bill Arning the retrospective of painter and photographer Marilyn Minter, "Pretty/Dirty" (2015–2016), which toured four cities and closed at the Brooklyn Museum’s Elizabeth A. Sackler Center for Feminist Art.

== Selected publications ==
- Auther, Elissa (2009-12-21). String, Felt, Thread: The Hierarchy of Art and Craft in American Art. Minneapolis, Minn.: Univ Of Minnesota Press. ISBN 978-0-8166-5609-7.
- Auther, E. (2004-03-01). "The Decorative, Abstraction, and the Hierarchy of Art and Craft in the Art Criticism of Clement Greenberg". Oxford Art Journal. 27 (3): 339–364. doi:10.1093/oaj/27.3.339. ISSN 0142-6540.
- Bryan-Wilson, Julia (2011-11-02). Auther, Elissa; Lerner, Adam (eds.). West of Center: Art and the Counterculture Experiment in America, 1965–1977 (1st ed.). Denver, Colo: Univ Of Minnesota Press. ISBN 978-0-8166-7726-9.
- Auther, Elissa (2016), "Sheila Hicks and the consecration of fiber art", Re-envisioning the Contemporary Art Canon, Routledge, pp. 90–103, doi:10.4324/9781315639772-11, ISBN 978-1-315-63977-2
