= Denver Botanic Gardens =

Public garden in Colorado

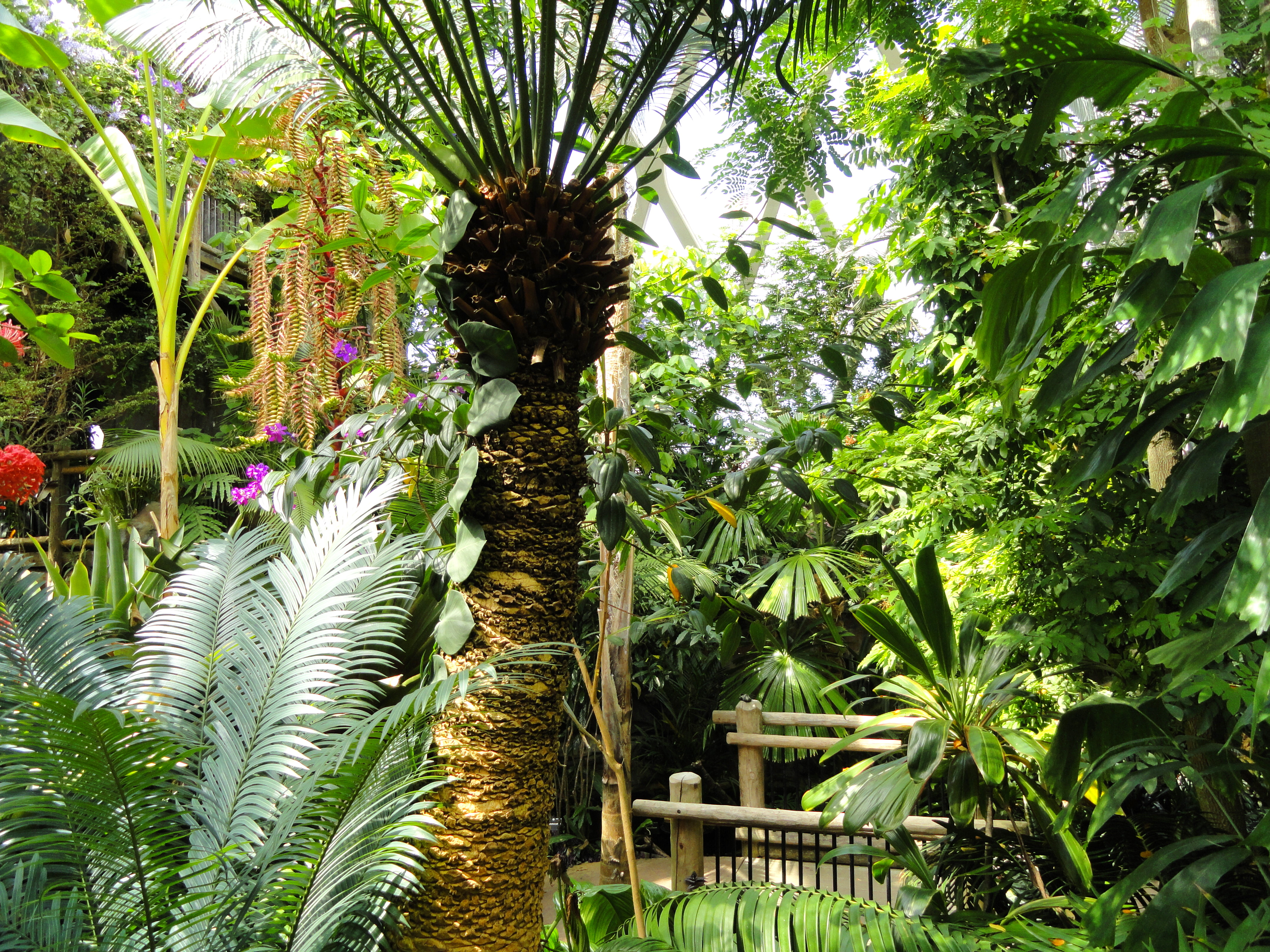
- A view inside the Denver Botanic Garden's covered tropical greenhouse.
- Interactive map of Denver Botanic Gardens
- Type: Botanic
- Location: Denver, Colorado
- Coordinates: 39°43′57″N 104°57′39″W
- Area: 23 acres (9.3 ha)
- Created: 1951
- Website: www.botanicgardens.org

The Denver Botanic Gardens is a public botanical garden located in the Cheesman Park neighborhood of Denver, Colorado. The 23-acre (93,000 m^{2}) park contains a conservatory, a variety of theme gardens and a sunken amphitheater, which hosts various concerts in the summer.

== Location ==
There are three diverse locations that are part of the Denver Botanic Gardens as a whole. The main location, and the formal garden, is the York Street location in east-central Denver. Denver Botanic Gardens at Chatfield (near Chatfield State Park) features natural meadow and riparian areas, as well as a historic farm and homestead. Mt. Goliath, on the route to Mount Blue Sky, is an alpine wildflower garden (along hiking trails).

The Denver Botanic Gardens, along with nearby Cheesman Park and Congress Park, sit atop what used to be Prospect Hill cemetery. Although the majority of bodies were removed in 1893, the interred continued to be removed as late as the 1950s. As recently as 2008, graves were uncovered during renovation of the park's irrigation and sprinkler systems.

== The Gardens ==
Denver Botanic Gardens features North America's largest collection of plants from cold temperate climates around the world, as well as 7 diverse gardens that mostly include plants from Colorado and neighboring states.

The world's first Xeriscape Demonstration Garden was created at the Gardens in 1986, and 2 years later its name was changed to Dryland Mesa. It was based on the "7 Principles" of Xeriscape, and includes drought-tolerant plants from the arid West and Mediterranean areas.

The Japanese Garden is called Shofu-en—the Garden of Wind and Pines. It was designed by Koichi Kawana in collaboration with Kai Kwahara.

The York Street location of the Botanic Gardens opened Denver's first publicly accessible green roof.

The Denver Botanic Gardens also boasts the first conservatory in America that was made entirely of concrete and Plexiglas panes, each of which were designed to channel condensation to the sides of the walls so it would not drip on visitors. The Boettcher Memorial Tropical Conservatory was awarded landmark status in 1973

In 2020, the Gardens published Firsthand: Creating Gardens for All People, commissioned by CEO Brian Vogt, researched by Karen Peters, Davis Benson and Dan Obarski, and published by Beckon Books. The book won the Independent Book Publishers Association Benjamin Franklin Silver Award in the Coffee Table book category in 2021.

== Gallery ==
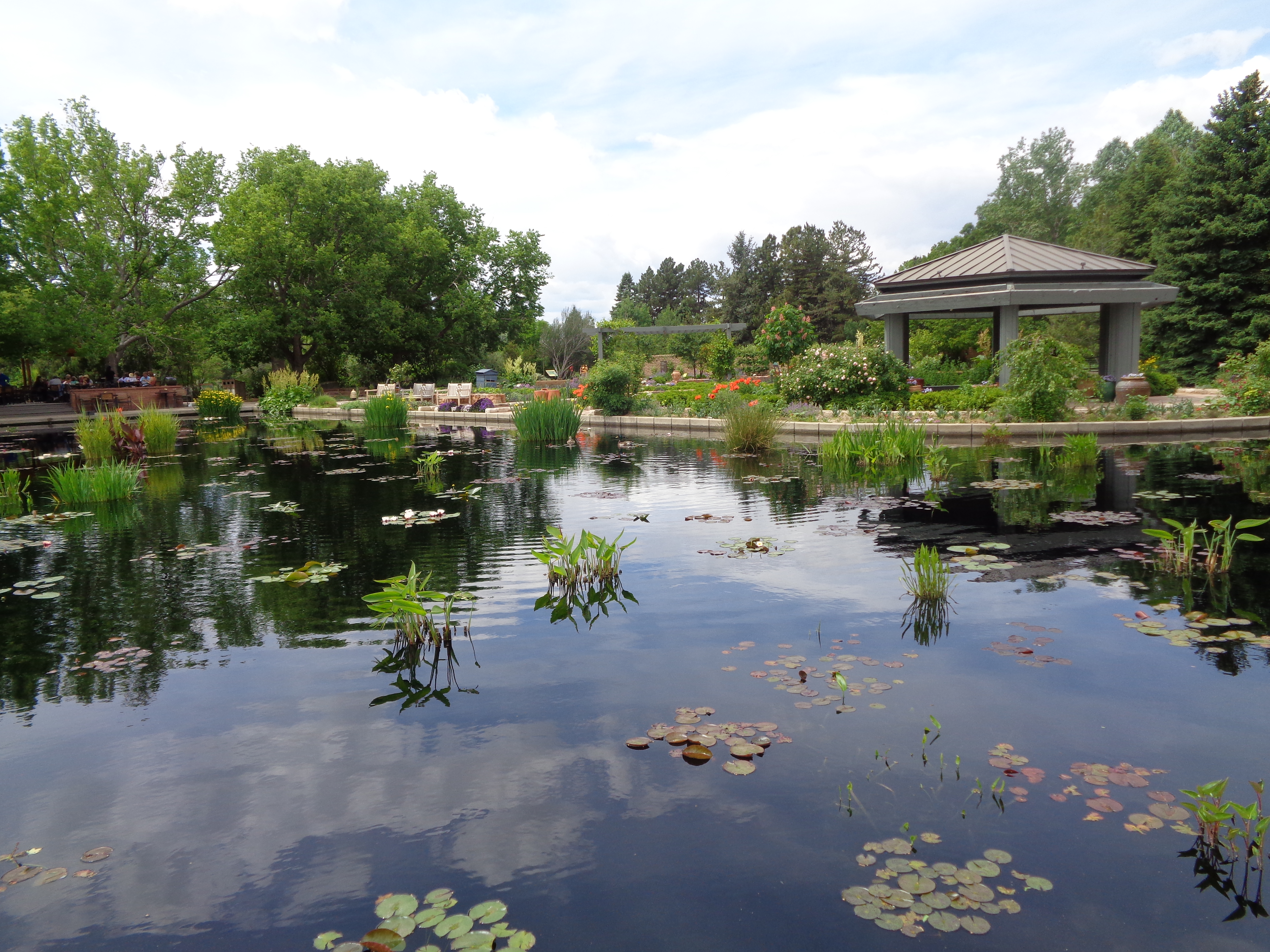
The Japanese Garden

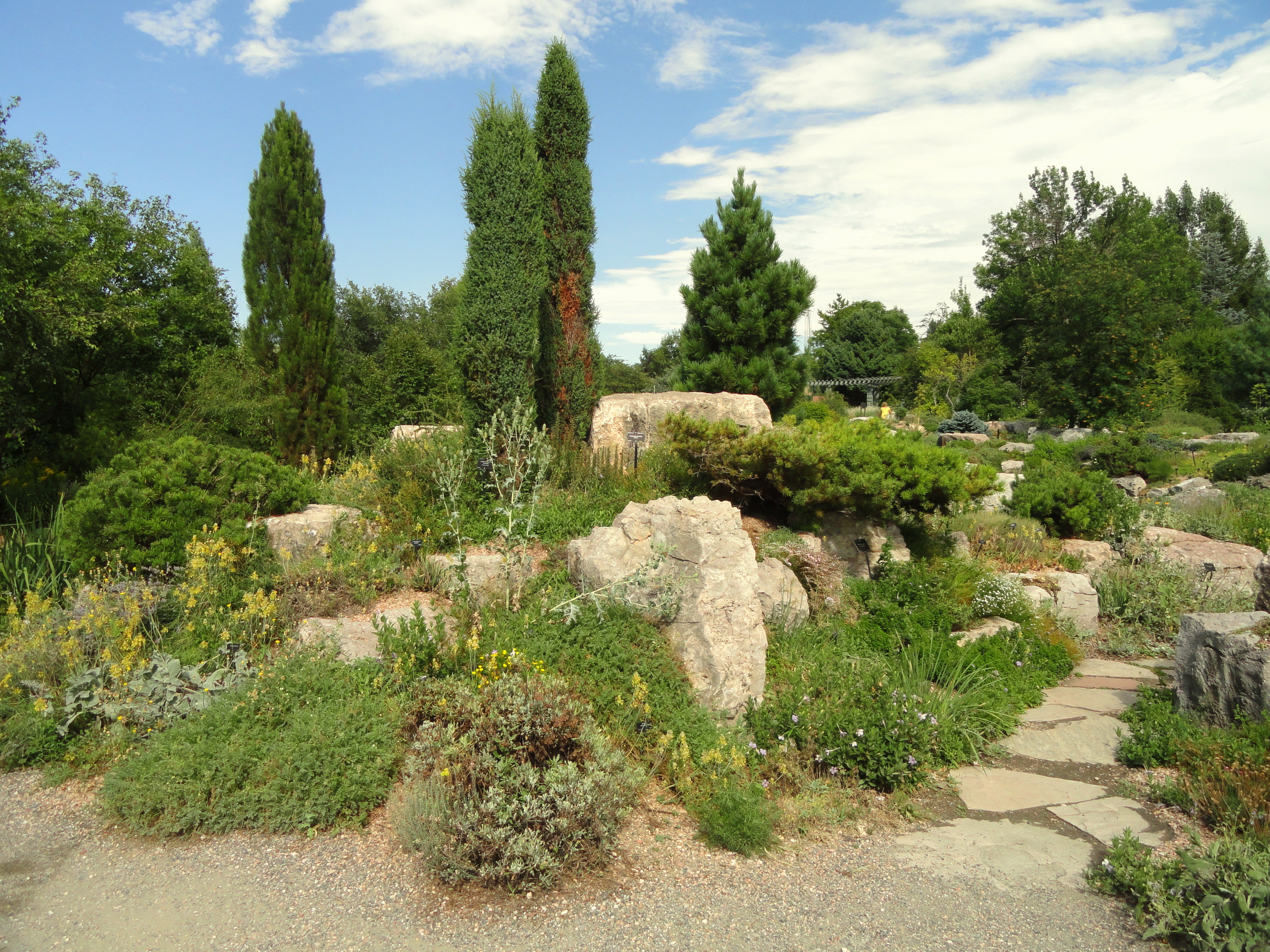
Outdoor exhibit that showcase plants from the Western United States, especially the Rocky Mountain region

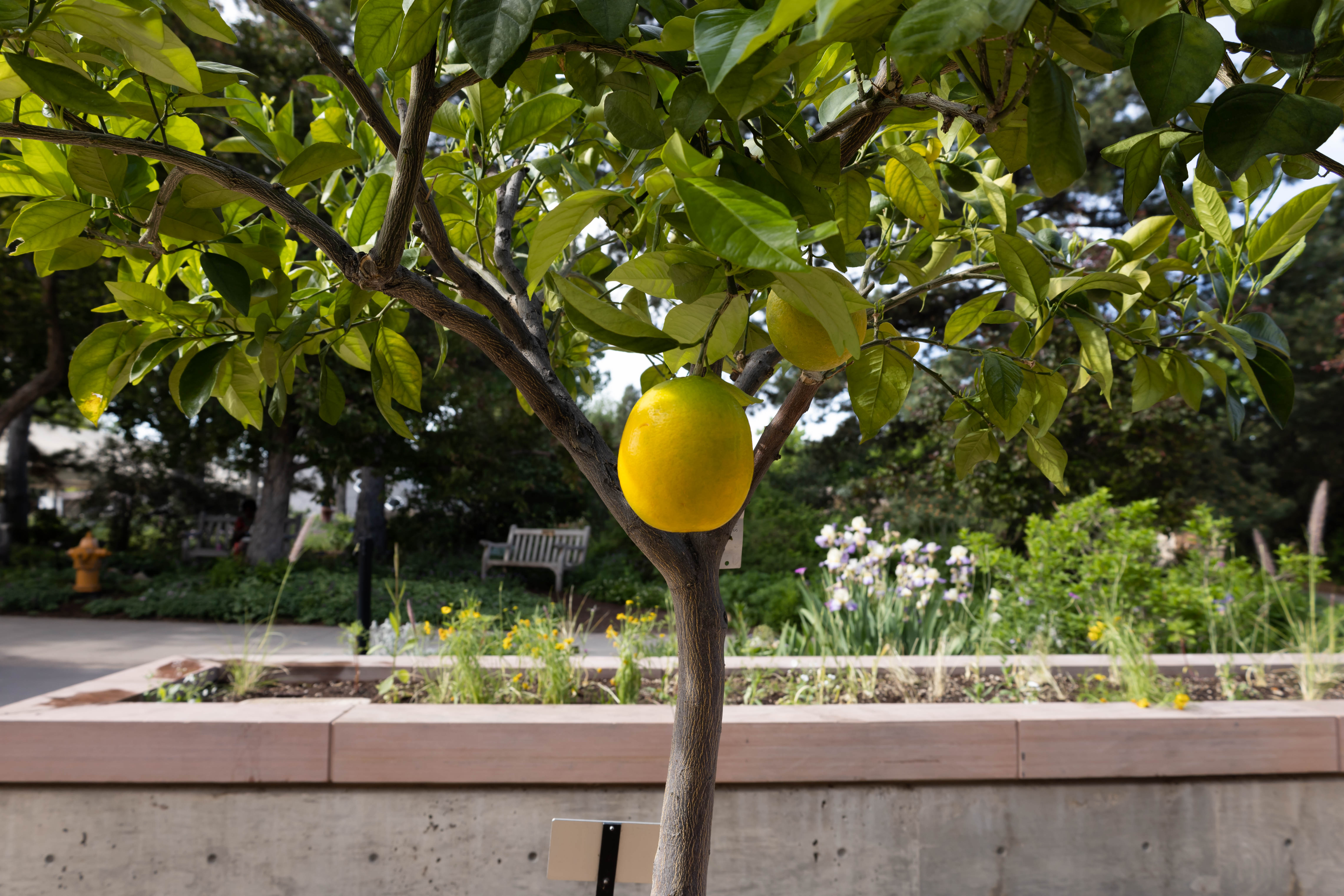
A fruit tree

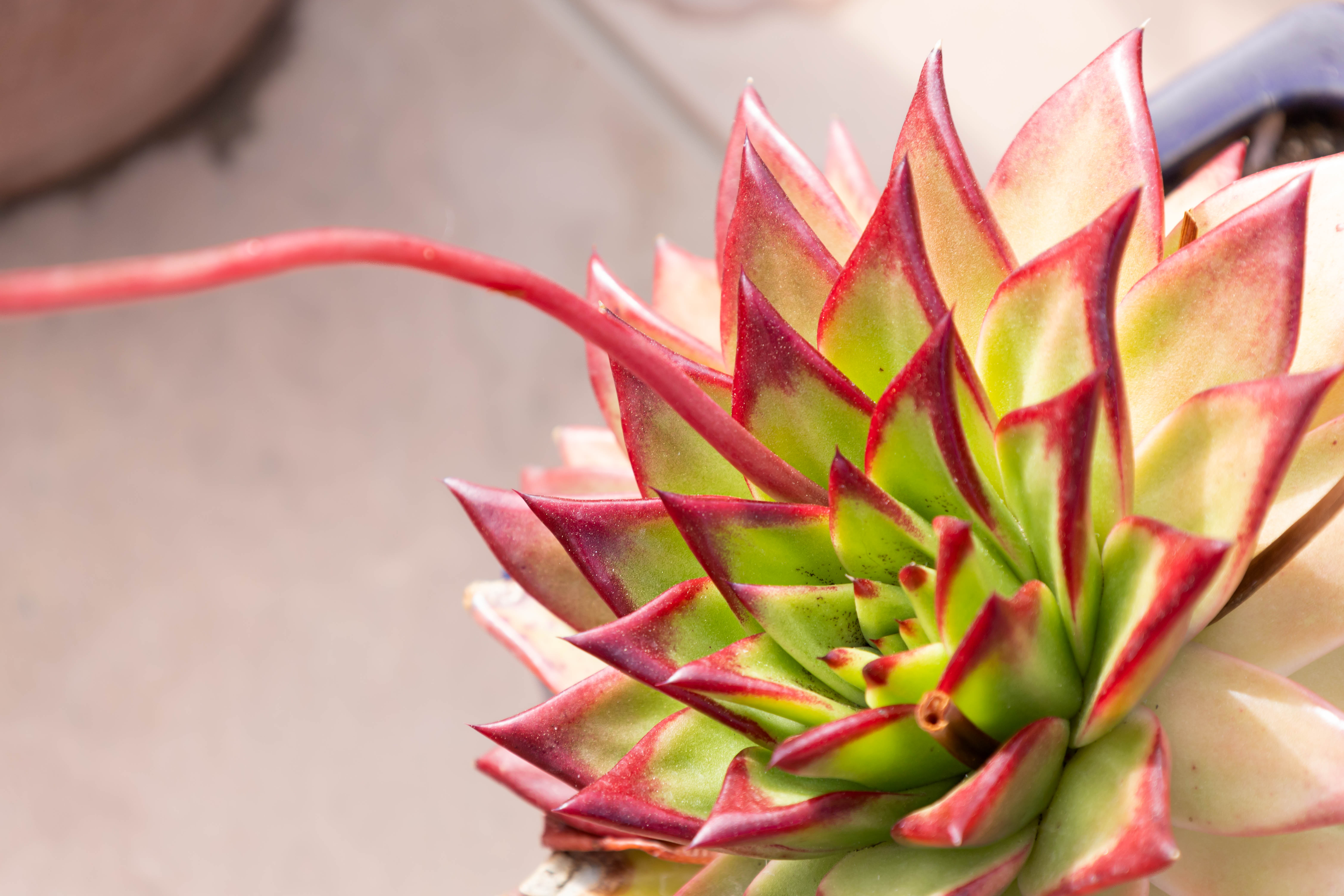
Many plant species at the garden

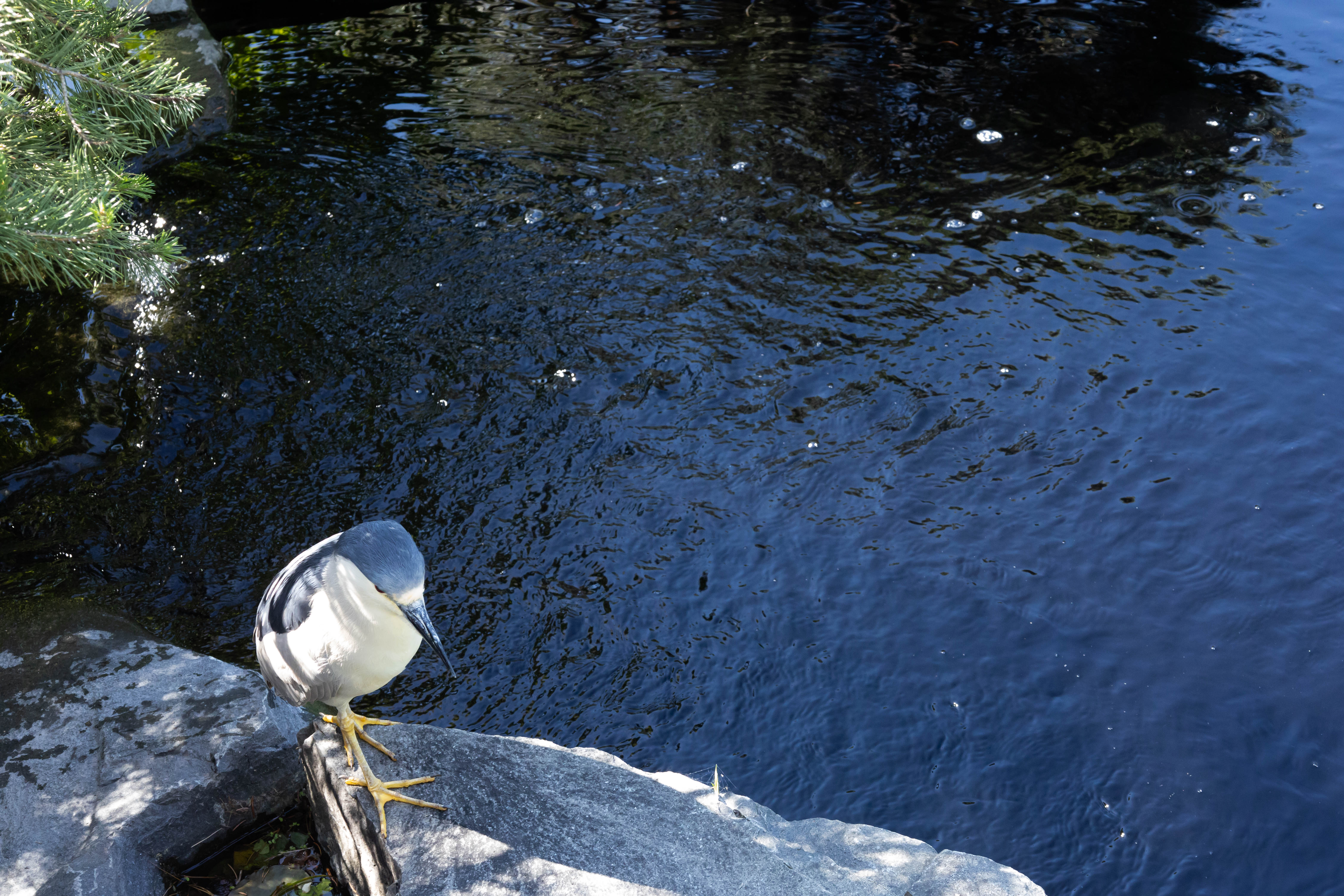
Close up view of a bird at the pond

== See also ==
- Boettcher Memorial Tropical Conservatory
- List of botanical gardens in the United States
