= Mark Sink =

American photographer (born 1958)

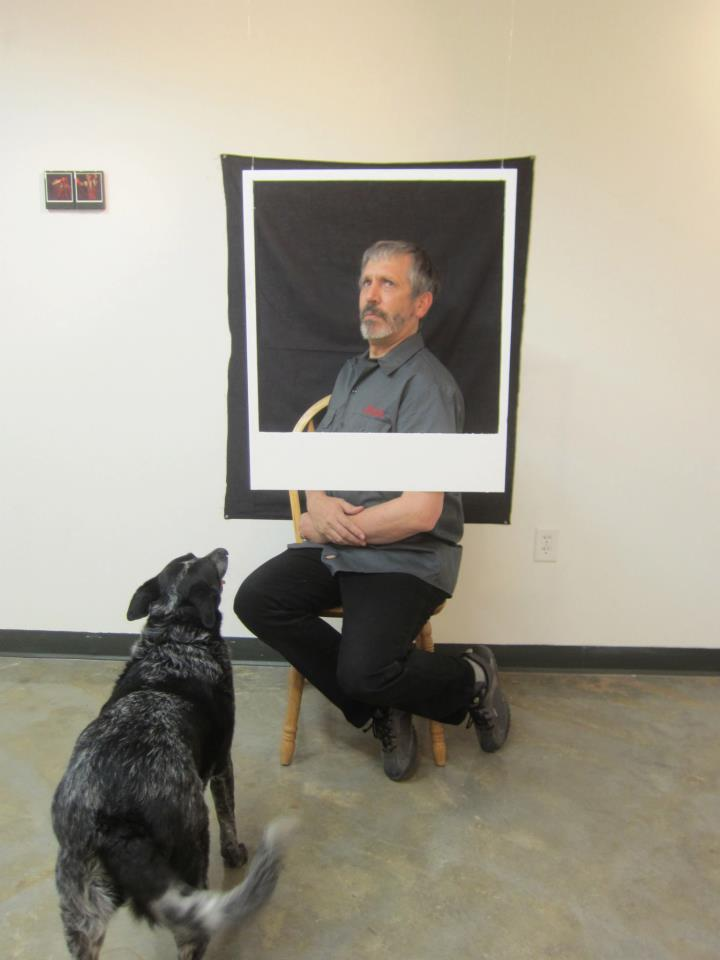
- Mark Sink's self-portrait with his dog Utah, in Denver, Colorado, U.S.
- Born: December 22, 1958 (age 67); Denver, Colorado, U.S.
- Education: Metropolitan State University of Denver, Colorado
- Known for: Photography, Curatorial
- Movement: Portraiture
- Spouse: Kristen Hatgi Sink
- Website: www.gallerysink.com

Mark Sink (born 1958, Denver, CO) is an American photographer best known for romantic portraiture. Some of his most recognizable images include documentation of life and work of artists such as Andy Warhol, Jean Michel Basquiat, Rene Ricard and other artists from the New York art scene of the 1980s, before returning to Denver. Mark Sink has been exhibiting his work professionally since 1978 to the present day from street art, commercial galleries, museums and other institutions.

== Photography ==
=== Career ===
Sink started his career using the Diana, a 120 plastic toy camera, whose soft focus and inconsistencies create beautifully romantic black and white images. The artist used this simple tool to create moving and intimate portraits of Jean-Michel Basquiat, Warhol and Rene Ricard, Grace Jones, Keith Haring, Adam Fuss, Edward Ruscha to Uma Thurman and many others. Sink's long career includes work from darkroom to digital, photo silkscreen, Polaroid, cyanotypes, and silver prints, as well as platinum printing. In the past decade, Sink and his partner Kristen Hatgi Sink have been using an early photographic process of collodion wet plate for romantic portraiture, photographing friends and models to Governor John Hickenlooper, Gogol Bordello, Ryan McGinley and Dennis Hopper.

=== Exhibition history ===
His portraits and other works have been continuously exhibited in the United States, South America and Europe. His work has appeared at the Whitney Museum of American Art, Denver Art Museum, Museum of Contemporary Art Denver, Boulder Museum of Contemporary Art, Jeffery Deitch Projects, Kinsey Institute, and MUFOCO, as well as many commercial art galleries in group and solo exhibitions. Sink's contributing editorial photography appeared in print and online in Vogue, Artforum, Art in America, Interview Magazine, Aspen Magazine and MGF. In 2011, Sink was included in Warhol in Colorado at the Victoria H. Myhren Gallery, University of Denver, alongside photographers John Bonath and Valere Harris Shane, featuring photographs of Andy Warhol taken in New York and Colorado in the 1980s.

== Founder / Curator ==
=== Month of Photography (MoP Denver) ===
Mark Sink is the founder and director of Month of Photography Denver (MoP). Starting in 2004, the festival has gained momentum, Sink biennially coordinates over hundred eighty regional galleries, museums and art spaces to celebrate national and international photography across Colorado. In recent years of the MoP Festival, RedLine has been the host for the main exhibition personally curated by Mark Sink. In 2017, aside from their own exhibition space, Colorado Photographic Arts Center curated an exhibition in the RedLine Project Space gallery.

=== The Denver Salon ===
Throughout his career, Mark Sink founded many organizations that celebrate contemporary cutting edge photography. The Denver Salon was founded in 1992 and in 2014 transformed into the Denver Collage Club nomadically organizing exhibitions and showcasing contemporary art of living Colorado artists. The Denver Collage club is continuously an active participant of the Month of Photography events.

=== BIG PICTURE / Festival of Light ===
Another project of note within MoP is the BIG PICTURE, an international submission-based street art exchange. The submitted large scale photographs are wheat-pasted in the open air in over fifty cities worldwide, happening weekly during MoP. Month of Photography Denver a part of the international Festival of Light, a collaboration of photography festivals around the world, including: Denver, Paris, Portland, Houston, Aleppo, Buenos Aires, Derby, Mexico City, Montreal and Toronto and many others.

=== Museum of Contemporary Art Denver ===
In 1996 Mark Sink, Dale Chisman, Marina Graves and Lawrence Argent partnered with a philanthropist Sue Cannon opened Denver's first Museum of Contemporary Art. Before the MCA moved to its permanent location in 2007, Mark Sink was one of the original directors of the Museum of Contemporary Art Denver until 2000 and remained as an original co-founding board member until 2005.

=== GALLERY SINK ===
Parallel to the conception of the MCA Denver, Mark Sink was running his own art gallery, GALLERY SINK, in the historic Denver Highland neighborhood opened in 1998. Some of the exhibited artists included Andy Warhol, Alice Neel, Chris Makos, Marie Cosindas, Paul Outerbridge, Walter Chappell, Winter Prather, Imogen Cunningham and many others. GALLERY SINK had great success for many years until the market crash in 2008, when Sink decided to focus on his own artistic practice, while moving his curatorial and art consulting practice to freelance and spend time to develop the Month of Photography. Mark Sink has been teaching, lecturing and reviewing photography since 1995 in Colorado and around the country. After taking the gallery to a nomadic style, Sink has been traveling for countless photo festivals and juried shows including FotoFest, CENTER, PhotoLucida, PhotoFence, Palm Springs Photo festival in NY and AZ.

== Selected publications ==
Some of Mark Sink's most recent interviews and publications range from the local Denver Post on his Byers-Evans House Museum Retrospective, Interviews with Colorado Public Radio on Andy Warhol and Jean-Michel Basquiat, Denver Westword. The international coverage of Month of Phrotography 2017 in L’Oeil De La Photographie, Seieties Magazine, and Wet Plate Day. His interviews on The Andy Warhol Diaries and his name can be found in The Andy Warhol Diaries Index, as well as a retrospective of Warhol's work in Fort Collins, where Sink and Warhol first met. Sink's editorial work can be found in TIME, Mother Jones, and can be found through Getty Images archive.
