= Howl (poem) =

1955 poem by Allen Ginsberg, part of the Beat Generation movement

- by Allen Ginsberg
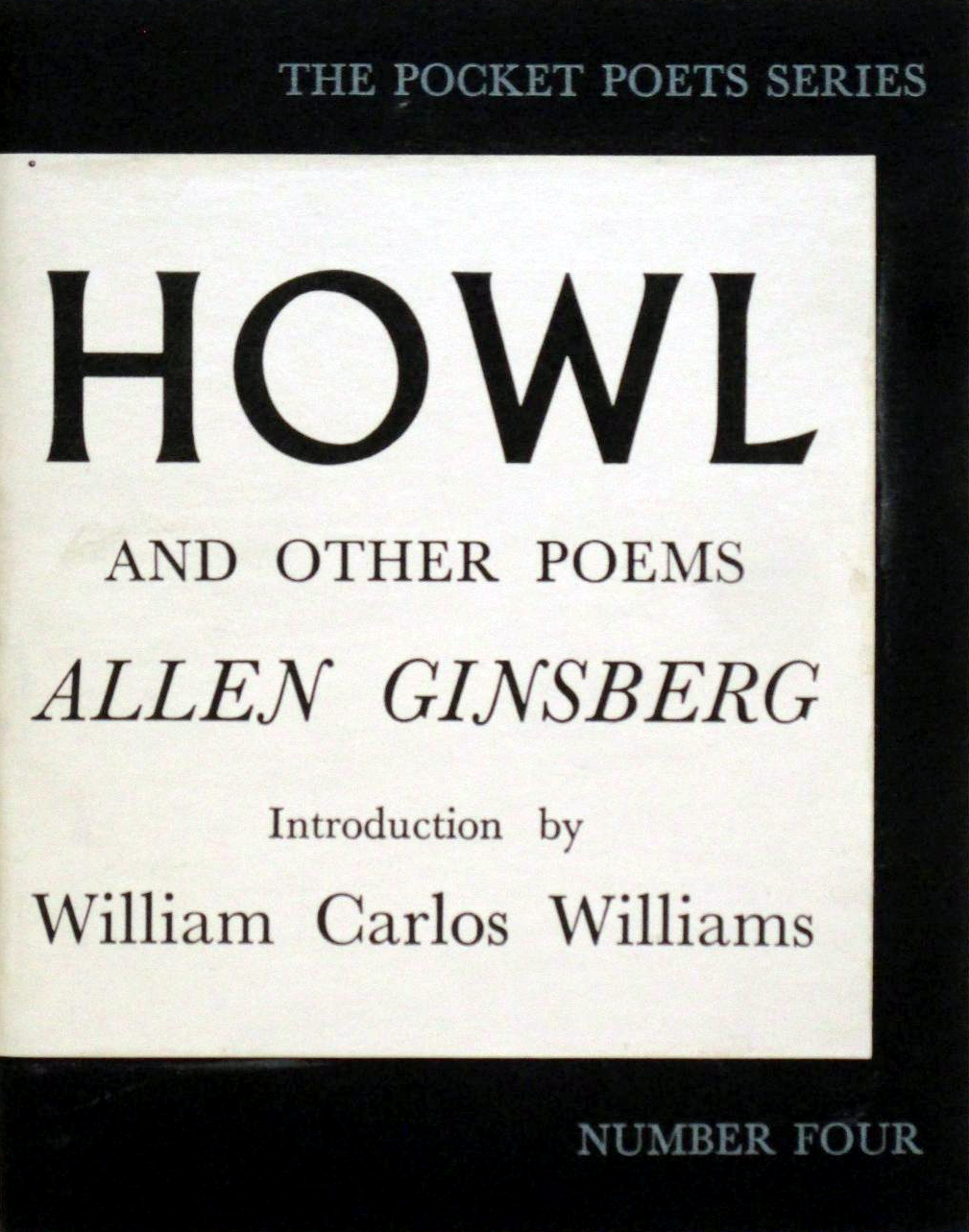
- Howl and Other Poems was published in the fall of 1956 as number four in the Pocket Poets Series from City Lights Books.
- Written: 1955
- Country: United States
- Language: English
- Genre(s): Beat poetry, LGBTQ poetry

"Howl", also known as "Howl for Carl Solomon", is a poem written by Allen Ginsberg in 1954–1955 and published in his 1956 collection, Howl and Other Poems. The poem is dedicated to Carl Solomon.

Ginsberg began work on "Howl" in autumn of 1954. He performed the poem at the Six Gallery reading in San Francisco in October 1955. Fellow poet Lawrence Ferlinghetti of City Lights Books, who attended the performance, published the work in 1956. Upon the book's release, Ferlinghetti and the City Lights Bookstore manager, Shigeyoshi Murao, were charged with disseminating obscene literature, and both were arrested. On October 3, 1957, Judge Clayton W. Horn ruled that the poem was not obscene.

Although highly controversial at first, and excluded for years from the academic canon, "Howl" has gradually come to be regarded as a great work of twentieth-century American literature. The poem is also closely associated with the group of writers known as the Beat Generation.

== Composition of the poem ==
According to Ginsberg's bibliographer and archivist Bill Morgan, "Howl" was inspired by a terrifying peyote vision on the evening of October 17, 1954 in the Nob Hill apartment of Ginsberg's girlfriend Sheila Williams, when the façade of the Sir Francis Drake Hotel in the San Francisco fog seemed as the monstrous face of a child-eating demon. Ginsberg's notes on the nightmarish vision became the basis for Part II of the poem.

In late 1954 and 1955, in an apartment he had rented at 1010 Montgomery Street in the North Beach neighborhood of San Francisco, Ginsberg worked on the poem, originally referring to it by the title "Strophes". Some drafts were purportedly written at the Caffe Mediterraneum in Berkeley; Ginsberg had moved into a small cottage in Berkeley a few blocks from the campus of the University of California on September 1, 1955. Many factors went into the creation of the poem. Shortly before, Ginsberg's therapist Dr. Philip Hicks had encouraged him to follow his desire to quit an unsatisfying market-research job and pursue poetry full-time, and to accept his own homosexuality. At that point in his evolution as a poet, Ginsberg was experimenting with a syntactic subversion of meaning called parataxis, exemplified in the poem "Dream Record, 1955" about the death of Joan Vollmer. It was a technique that became central in "Howl".

Ginsberg showed "Dream Record, 1955" to Kenneth Rexroth, who criticized it as too stilted and academic; Rexroth urged Ginsberg to free his voice and write from the heart. Ginsberg took this advice and attempted to write a poem with no restrictions. He was under the influence of both William Carlos Williams and his "imagist preoccupations", as well as Jack Kerouac and his emphasis on spontaneity. Ginsberg began the poem in the stepped triadic form he took from Williams but, in the middle of typing the verses, his poetic voice altered such that his own unique style (a long line based on breath organized by a fixed base) started to emerge.

The lines he wrote in this first burst of inspiration would later be included in Parts I and III of "Howl". These parts are noted for their tumbling, hallucinatory style; for relating stories and experiences of Ginsberg's friends and contemporaries; and for frankly discussing sexuality, specifically homosexuality, which subsequently provoked an obscenity trial. Although Ginsberg referred in the poem to many of his friends and acquaintances (including Neal Cassady, Jack Kerouac, William S. Burroughs, Peter Orlovsky, Lucien Carr, and Herbert Huncke), the primary emotional drive was his sympathy for Carl Solomon, to whom "Howl" was dedicated. He had met Solomon in a mental institution and developed a friendship with him. Ginsberg later stated that his sympathy for Solomon was connected to bottled-up guilt and sympathy for his own mother's schizophrenia (she had been lobotomized), an issue he was not yet ready to address directly.

When the poem was published in the collection, Howl and Other Poems (1956), Ginsberg's dedication stated that "Several phrases and the title of Howl" were taken from Kerouac. As confirmation of the title's origin, Ann Charters wrote in her 1973 Kerouac biography that Ginsberg mailed a draft of the poem to Kerouac in the summer of 1955. The latter liked it immensely and replied with enthusiasm, "I received your Howl." In 2008, Peter Orlovsky suggested a different origin: he told the co-directors of the film Howl that a short moonlit walk with Ginsberg—during which Orlovsky sang a rendition of the Hank Williams song "Howlin' at the Moon"—may have been the encouragement for the poem's title: "I never asked him [Ginsberg], and he never offered," Orlovsky recalled, "but there were things he would pick up on and use in his verse form some way or another. Poets do it all the time."

== Performance and publication ==
Part I of "Howl" was first performed at the Six Gallery reading in San Francisco on October 7, 1955. Ginsberg had not originally intended the poem for performance. The reading was conceived by Wally Hedrick, a painter and co-founder of the Six Gallery, which was a co-op art gallery and meeting place for the Bay Area avant-garde. Hedrick approached Ginsberg in mid-1955 and asked him to organize a poetry reading at the venue: "At first, Ginsberg refused. But once he'd written a rough draft of Howl, he changed his 'fucking mind', as he put it."

Ginsberg was ultimately responsible for inviting the other readers—Gary Snyder, Philip Lamantia, Philip Whalen, and Michael McClure—and crafting the invitation. Kenneth Rexroth served as master of ceremonies. "Howl" was the second-to-last reading (before "A Berry Feast" by Snyder) and was considered by most in attendance the highlight of the evening. Many regarded it as the beginning of a new movement, and the reputation of Ginsberg and those associated with the Six Gallery reading spread throughout San Francisco. In response to Ginsberg's performance, McClure wrote: "Ginsberg read on to the end of the poem, which left us standing in wonder, or cheering and wondering, but knowing at the deepest level that a barrier had been broken, that a human voice and body had been hurled against the harsh wall of America...."

In his 1958 novel The Dharma Bums, Jack Kerouac gave a first-hand account of the Six Gallery performance (in which Ginsberg is renamed "Alvah Goldbrook" and the poem becomes 'Wail'):

Anyway I followed the whole gang of howling poets to the reading at Gallery Six that night, which was, among other important things, the night of the birth of the San Francisco Poetry Renaissance. Everyone was there. It was a mad night. And I was the one who got things jumping by going around collecting dimes and quarters from the rather stiff audience standing around in the gallery and coming back with three huge gallon jugs of California Burgundy and getting them all piffed so that by eleven o'clock when Alvah Goldbrook was reading his poem 'Wail' drunk with arms outspread everybody was yelling 'Go! Go! Go!' (like a jam session) and old Rheinhold Cacoethes [Kenneth Rexroth] the father of the Frisco poetry scene was wiping his tears in gladness.

Within hours, Lawrence Ferlinghetti—who ran City Lights Bookstore and its associated publishing house, City Lights Books—sent Ginsberg a Western Union telegram requesting the "Howl" manuscript. Two months later, Carl Solomon gave Ginsberg permission to publish the poem.

On October 1, 1956, Howl and Other Poems was published by City Lights as number four in its Pocket Poets Series. Ginsberg had finished Part II and the "Footnote" after Ferlinghetti promised to publish. Since "Howl" and its "Footnote" were not sufficient to make an entire book, Ginsberg supplied additional poems to fill out the volume. He selected several recently written works in which he had continued experimenting with "breath-length" lines and a fixed base – the technique he began using during the composition of "Howl". Some of the "other poems" in Howl and Other Poems, such as "America", "Sunflower Sutra", and "A Supermarket in California", would become among Ginsberg's most anthologized poems.

The earliest extant recording of "Howl" was thought to date from March 18, 1956, but in 2007 an earlier recording was found. Ginsberg had read his poem at the Anna Mann dormitory at Reed College on February 13 and 14, with the second of those dates recorded. The tape was in excellent condition and was released by Omnivore Recordings in 2021. In this recording, Ginsberg performs Part I of the poem. In the March 18 reading, in Berkeley, he performed all three parts.

== Overview and structure ==
The poem consists of 112 paragraph-like lines, which are organized into three parts, with an additional footnote.

=== Part I ===
Called by Ginsberg "a lament for the Lamb in America with instances of remarkable lamb-like youths", Part I is perhaps the best known, and communicates scenes, characters, and situations drawn from Ginsberg's personal experience as well as from the community of poets, artists, political radicals, jazz musicians, drug addicts, and psychiatric patients whom he had encountered in the late 1940s and early 1950s. Ginsberg refers to these people, who were underrepresented outcasts in what the poet believed to be an oppressively conformist and materialistic era, as "the best minds of my generation". He describes their experiences in graphic detail, openly discussing drug use and homosexual activity at multiple points.

Most lines in this section contain the fixed base "who". In his "Notes for Howl and Other Poems", Ginsberg writes: "I depended on the word 'who' to keep the beat, a base to keep measure, return to and take off from again onto another streak of invention".

=== Part II ===
Ginsberg says that Part II, in relation to Part I, "names the monster of mental consciousness that preys on the Lamb". Part II is about the state of industrial civilization, characterized in the poem as "Moloch". Ginsberg was inspired to write Part II during a period of peyote-induced visionary consciousness in which he saw a hotel façade as a monstrous and horrible visage which he identified with that of Moloch, the Biblical idol in Leviticus to whom the Canaanites sacrificed children.

Ginsberg intends that the characters he portrays in Part I be understood to have been sacrificed to this idol. Moloch is also the name of an industrial, demonic figure in Fritz Lang's Metropolis, a film that Ginsberg credits with influencing "Howl, Part II" in his annotations for the poem (see especially Howl: Original Draft Facsimile, Transcript & Variant Versions). Most lines in this section contain the fixed base "Moloch". Ginsberg says of Part II, "Here the long line is used as a stanza form broken within into exclamatory units punctuated by a base repetition, Moloch."

=== Part III ===
Part III, in relation to Parts I and II, is "a litany of affirmation of the Lamb in its glory", according to Ginsberg. It is directly addressed to Carl Solomon, whom Ginsberg met during a brief stay at a psychiatric hospital in 1949; called "Rockland" in the poem, it was actually Columbia Presbyterian Psychological Institute. This section is notable for its refrain, "I'm with you in Rockland", and represents something of a turning point away from the grim tone of the "Moloch"-section. Of the structure, Ginsberg says Part III is "pyramidal, with a graduated longer response to the fixed base".

=== Footnote ===
The closing section of the poem is the "Footnote", characterized by its repetitive "Holy!" mantra, an ecstatic assertion that everything is holy. Ginsberg says, "I remembered the archetypal rhythm of Holy Holy Holy weeping in a bus on Kearny Street, and wrote most of it down in notebook there. ... I set it as 'Footnote to Howl' because it was an extra variation of the form of Part II."

=== Rhythm ===
The frequently quoted and often parodied opening lines set the theme and rhythm for the poem:

I saw the best minds of my generation destroyed by madness, starving hysterical naked,
dragging themselves through the negro streets at dawn looking for an angry fix,
Angel-headed hipsters burning for the ancient heavenly connection
to the starry dynamo in the machinery of night,

Ginsberg's own commentary discusses the work as an experiment with the "long line". For example, Part I is structured as a single run-on sentence with a repetitive refrain dividing it up into breaths. Ginsberg said, "Ideally each line of 'Howl' is a single breath unit. My breath is long—that's the measure, one physical-mental inspiration of thought contained in the elastic of a breath."

On another occasion, he explained: "the line length ... you'll notice that they're all built on bop—you might think of them as a bop refrain—chorus after chorus after chorus—the ideal being, say, Lester Young in Kansas City in 1938, blowing 72 choruses of 'The Man I Love' until everyone in the hall was out of his head..."

== 1957 obscenity trial ==
"Howl" contains many references to illicit drugs and sexual practices, both heterosexual and homosexual. Claiming that the book was obscene, customs officials seized 520 copies of the poem that were being imported from England on March 25, 1957.

On June 3, Shig Murao, the City Lights Bookstore manager, was arrested and jailed for selling Howl and Other Poems to an undercover San Francisco police officer. City Lights publisher Lawrence Ferlinghetti was subsequently arrested for publishing the book. At the obscenity trial, nine literary experts testified on the poem's behalf. Ferlinghetti, an established poet himself, was credited (by David Skover and Ronald K. L. Collins) with breathing "publishing life" into Ginsberg's poetic career. Supported by the American Civil Liberties Union, Ferlinghetti won the case when California State Superior Court Judge Clayton Horn decided that the poem was of "redeeming social importance".

The "Howl" obscenity trial was widely publicized, with articles appearing in both Time and Life magazines. Ferlinghetti wrote his own account, published in Evergreen Review in 1957. His lead defense attorney Jake Ehrlich followed this with a book devoted to the landmark case entitled Howl of the Censor. The 2010 film Howl depicts the events of the trial. James Franco stars as the young Allen Ginsberg and Andrew Rogers portrays Ferlinghetti.

== 1969 broadcast controversy in Finland ==
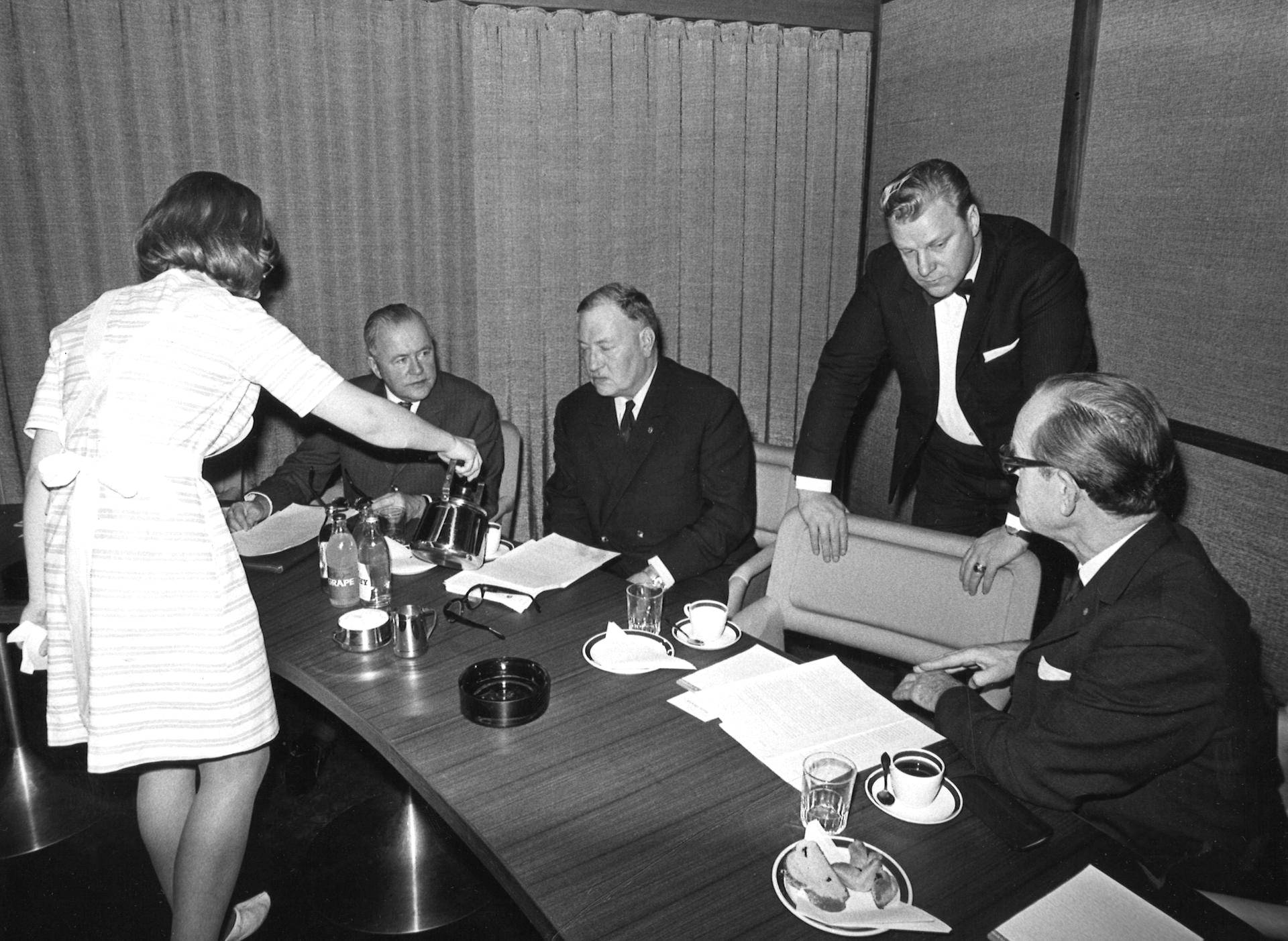
The administrative board of Yleisradio getting ready to discuss the broadcast of “Howl” in December 1969.

Part I of "Howl" was broadcast in Finland on September 30, 1969, on Yleisradio's (Finland's national public-broadcasting company) "parallel programme" at 10:30 p.m. The poem was read by three actors with jazz music specially composed for this radio broadcast by Henrik Otto Donner. The poem was preceded by an eight-minute introduction. The Finnish translation was made by Anselm Hollo.

A Liberal People's Party member of the Finnish Parliament, Arne Berner, heard the broadcast, and started an interpellation, addressed to the Minister of Transport and Public Works. It was signed by him and 82 of the 200 members of parliament. It is unclear how many of the other signatories actually had heard the broadcast. The interpellation text only contained a short extract of six lines (considered to be offensive, and representative of the poem) of over seventy from the poem, and the debate was mainly based upon them.

Also, a report of an offence was filed to the criminal investigation department of Helsinki police district because the obscenity of the poem allegedly offended modesty and delicacy. The report was filed by Suomen kotien radio- ja televisioliitto (The radio and television association of Finnish homes), a Christian and patriotic organization, and it was only based on the six-line fragment. In connection with that, Yleisradio was accused of copyright violation. No charges followed.

At that time, homosexual acts were still illegal in Finland.

Finally, the Ministry of Transport and Public Works considered in December 1969 that the broadcast of "Howl" contravened the licence of operation of Yleisradio: it was neither educational nor useful. Yleisradio received a reprimand, and was instructed to be more careful when monitoring that no more such programs should be broadcast.

== Biographical references and allusions ==
=== Part I ===
Line	Reference
"who bared their brains to Heaven under the El and saw Mohammedan angels staggering on tenement roofs illuminated."	This is a direct reference to a story told to Ginsberg by Kerouac about poet Philip Lamantia's "celestial adventure" after reading the Quran.
"Who passed through universities with radiant cool eyes hallucinating Arkansas and Blake—light tragedies among the scholars of war" and "who thought they were only mad when Baltimore gleamed in supernatural ecstasy"	Ginsberg had an auditory hallucination in 1948 of William Blake reading his poems "Ah! Sun-flower", "The Sick Rose", and "The Little Girl Lost". Ginsberg said the hallucination revealed to him the interconnectedness of all existence. He said his drug experimentation in many ways was an attempt to recapture that feeling.
"Who were expelled from the academy for crazy & publishing obscene odes on the windows of the skull"	Part of the reason Ginsberg was suspended in his sophomore year from Columbia University was that he wrote obscenities on his dirty dorm room windows. He suspected the cleaning woman of being an anti-Semite because she never cleaned the windows in his room, and he expressed this opinion in explicit terms by writing "Fuck the Jews" and drawing a swastika on the windows. He also wrote a phrase implying the university president had no testicles.
"who cowered in unshaven rooms in underwear, burning their money in wastebaskets and listening to the Terror through the wall"	Lucien Carr burned his insanity record, along with $20, at his mother's insistence.
"... poles of Canada and Paterson..."	Kerouac was French-Canadian from Lowell, Massachusetts; Ginsberg grew up in Paterson, New Jersey.
"who sank all night in submarine light of Bickford's floated out and sat through the stale beer afternoons in desolate Fugazzi's..."	Bickford's and Fugazzi's were New York spots where the Beats hung out. Ginsberg worked briefly at Fugazzi's.
"... Tangerian bone-grindings ..." "... Tangiers to boys ..." and "Holy Tangiers!"	William S. Burroughs lived in Tangier, Morocco at the time Ginsberg wrote "Howl". He also experienced withdrawal from heroin, which he wrote about in several letters to Ginsberg.
"who studied Plotinus Poe St. John of the Cross telepathy and bop kabbalah because the cosmos instinctively vibrated at their feet in Kansas"	Mystics and forms of mysticism in which Ginsberg at one time had an interest.
"who disappeared into the volcanoes of Mexico".	Both a reference to John Hoffman, a friend of Philip Lamantia and Carl Solomon, who died in Mexico, and a reference to Under the Volcano by Malcolm Lowry.
"weeping and undressing while the sirens of Los Alamos wailed them down"	A reference to a protest staged by Judith Malina, Julian Beck, and other members of The Living Theatre.
"who bit detectives in the neck ... dragged off the roof waving genitals and manuscripts." Also, from "who ... fell out of the subway window" to "the blast of colossal steam whistles".	A specific reference to Bill Cannastra, who actually did most of these things and died when he "fell out of the subway window".
"Saintly motorcyclists"	A reference to Marlon Brando and his biker persona in The Wild One.
From "Who copulated ecstatic and insatiate" to "Who went out whoring through Colorado in myriad stolen night-cars, N. C. secret hero of these poems". Also, from "who barreled down the highways of the past" to "& now Denver is lonesome for her heroes"	A reference to Neal Cassady (N.C.) who lived in Denver, Colorado, and had a reputation for being sexually voracious, as well as stealing cars.
"who walked all night with their shoes full of blood on the showbank docks waiting for a door in the East River to open to a room full of steamheat and opium"	A specific reference to Herbert Huncke's condition after being released from Riker's Island.
"... and rose to build harpsichords in their lofts ..."	Friend Bill Keck built harpsichords. Ginsberg had a conversation with Keck's wife shortly before writing "Howl".
"who coughed on the sixth floor of Harlem crowned with flame under the tubercular sky surrounded by orange crates of theology"	This is a reference to the apartment in which Ginsberg lived when he had his Blake vision. His roommate, Russell Durgin, was a theology student and kept his books in orange crates.
"who threw their watches off the roof to cast their ballot with eternity outside of time ..."	A reference to Ginsberg's Columbia classmate Louis Simpson, an incident that happened during a brief stay in a mental institution for post-traumatic stress disorder.
"who were burned alive in their innocent flannel suits on Madison Avenue ... the nitroglycerine shrieks of the fairies of advertising"	Ginsberg worked as a market researcher for Towne-Oller Associates in San Francisco, on Montgomery Street, not Madison Avenue.
"who jumped off the Brooklyn Bridge ..."	A specific reference to Tuli Kupferberg.
"who crashed through their minds in jail ..."	A reference to Jean Genet's Le Condamné à mort (poem translated as "The Man Sentenced to Death").
"who retired to Mexico to cultivate a habit, or Rocky Mount to tender Buddha or Tangiers to boys or Southern Pacific to the black locomotive or Harvard to Narcissus to Woodlawn to the daisychain or grave"	Many of the Beats went to Mexico City to "cultivate" a drug "habit", but Ginsberg claims this is a direct reference to Burroughs and Bill Garver, though Burroughs lived in Tangiers at the time (as Ginsberg says in "America": "Burroughs is in Tangiers I don't think he'll come back it's sinister"). Rocky Mount, North Carolina, is where Jack Kerouac's sister lived (as recounted in The Dharma Bums). Also, Neal Cassady was a brakeman for the Southern Pacific. John Hollander was an alumnus of Harvard. Ginsberg's mother Naomi lived near Woodlawn Cemetery.
"Accusing the radio of hypnotism ..."	A reference to Ginsberg's mother Naomi, who suffered from paranoid schizophrenia. It also refers to Antonin Artaud's reaction to shock therapy and his "To Have Done with the Judgement of God", which Solomon introduced to Ginsberg at Columbia Presbyterian Psychological Institute.
From "who threw potato salad at CCNY lecturers on Dadaism ..." to "resting briefly in catatonia"	A specific reference to Carl Solomon. Initially this final section went straight into what is now Part III, which is entirely about Carl Solomon. Dadaism is an art movement emphasizing nonsense and irrationality. In the poem, it is the subject of a lecture that is interrupted by students throwing potato salad at the professors. This ironically mirrored the playfulness of the movement but in a darker context. A post-WWI cultural movement, Dada stood for 'anti-art', it was against everything that art stood for. Founded in Zurich, Switzerland. The meaning of the word means two different definitions; "hobby horse" and "father", chosen randomly. The Dada movement spread rapidly.
"Pilgrim's State's Rockland's and Greystone's foetid halls ..." and "I'm with you in Rockland"	These are mental institutions associated with either Ginsberg's mother Naomi or Carl Solomon: Pilgrim State Hospital and Rockland State Hospital in New York and Greystone Park Psychiatric Hospital in New Jersey. Ginsberg met Solomon at Columbia Presbyterian Psychological Institute, but "Rockland" was frequently substituted for "rhythmic euphony".
"with mother finally ******"	Ginsberg admitted that the deletion here was an expletive. He left it purposefully elliptical "to introduce appropriate element of uncertainty". In later readings, many years after he was able to distance himself from his difficult history with his mother, he reinserted the word "fucked".
"obsessed with a sudden flash of the alchemy of the use of the ellipse the catalog the meter (alt: variable measure) & the vibrating plane". Also, from "who dreamt and made incarnate gaps in Time & Space" to "what might be left to say in time come after death".	This is a recounting of Ginsberg's discovery of his own style and the debt he owed to his strongest influences. He discovered the use of the ellipse from haiku and the shorter poetry of Ezra Pound and William Carlos Williams. "The catalog" is a reference to Walt Whitman's long line style which Ginsberg adapted. "The meter"/"variable measure" is a reference to Williams' insistence on the necessity of measure. Though "Howl" may seem formless, Ginsberg claimed it was written in a concept of measure adapted from Williams' idea of breath, the measure of lines in a poem being based on the breath in reading. Ginsberg's breath in reading, he said, happened to be longer than Williams'. "The vibrating plane" is a reference to Ginsberg's discovery of the "eyeball kick" in his study of Cézanne.
"Pater Omnipotens Aeterna Deus"/"omnipotent, eternal father God"	This was taken directly from Cézanne.
"to recreate the measure and syntax of poor human prose ..."	A reference to the tremendous influence Kerouac and his ideas of "Spontaneous Prose" had on Ginsberg's work and specifically this poem.
"what might be left to say in time come after death"	A reference to Louis Zukofsky's translation of Catullus: "What might be left to say anew in time after death ..." Also a reference to a section from the final pages of Visions of Cody, "I'm writing this book because we're all going to die", and so on.
"eli eli lamma lamma sabacthani"	One of the sayings of Jesus on the cross, also Psalm 22:1: "My God, my God, why have you forsaken me?" The phrase in Psalms was transliterated as "azavtani"; however, Ginsberg stayed true to how Jesus translated the phrase in the Gospels. The phrase used by Ginsberg was translated properly as "Why have you sacrificed me?" This ties into the themes of misfortune and religious adulation of conformity through the invocation of Moloch in Part II. Though Ginsberg grew up in an agnostic household, he was very interested in his Jewish roots and in other concepts of spiritual transcendence. Although later Ginsberg was a devoted Buddhist, at this time he was only beginning to study Buddhism along with other forms of spirituality.

=== Part II ===
Line	Reference
"Moloch! Solitude! Filth! Ugliness!"	Fire god of the Canaanites referred to in Leviticus 18:21: "And thou shalt not let any of thy seed pass through the fire to Molech." Worship of Moloch involved the sacrifice of children by fire.
"Moloch whose buildings are judgement!"	A reference to Urizen, one of William Blake's four Zoas.
"Crossbone soulless jailhouse and congress of sorrows ..." and "Holy the solitudes of skyscrapers and pavements! Holy the cafeterias filled with the millions!"	A reference to Gods' Man, a graphic novel by Lynd Ward which was in Ginsberg’s childhood library.
From "Moloch whose breast is a cannibal dynamo!" to "Moloch whose skyscrapers stand in the long streets like endless Jehovahs!"	A reference to several films by Fritz Lang, most notably Metropolis in which the name "Moloch" is directly related to a monstrous factory. Ginsberg also claimed he was inspired by Lang's M and The Testament of Dr. Mabuse.
"Moloch whose eyes are a thousand blind windows!"	Ginsberg claimed Part II of "Howl" was inspired by a peyote-induced vision of the Sir Francis Drake Hotel in San Francisco which appeared to him as a monstrous face.
From "Moloch whose soul is electricity and banks!" to "Moloch whose name is the Mind!"	A reference to Ezra Pound's idea of usury as related in The Cantos and ideas from Blake, specifically the "Mind forg'd manacles" from "London". Ginsberg claimed "Moloch whose name is the Mind!" is "a crux of the poem".
"Lifting the city to Heaven which exists and is everywhere about us"	A reference to "Morning" from Season in Hell by Arthur Rimbaud.

=== Part III ===
Line	Reference
"I'm with you in Rockland/where we are great writers on the same dreadful typewriter ..."	At Columbia Presbyterian Psychological Institute, Ginsberg and Solomon wrote satirical letters to Malcolm de Chazal and T. S. Eliot which they did not ultimately send.
"I'm with you in Rockland/where you drink the tea of the breasts of the spinsters of Utica."	A reference to Mamelles de Tiresias by Guillaume Apollinaire.
From "I'm with you in Rockland/where you scream in a straightjacket" to "fifty more shocks will never return your soul to its body again ..."	Solomon received shock treatment and was put in a straightjacket at Pilgrim State.
"I'm with you in Rockland/where you bang on a catatonic piano ..."	Ginsberg was the one reprimanded for banging on a piano at CPPI.
"I'm with you in Rockland/where you split the heavens of Long Island ..."	Pilgrim State is located on Long Island.
"I'm with you in Rockland/where there are twenty five thousand mad comrades all together singing the final stanzas of the Internationale ..."	The population of Pilgrim State was 25,000. "The Internationale" was a song used and made popular by worker movements, and was featured in the Little Red Songbook of the Industrial Workers of the World.
"... the door of my cottage in the Western night."	A reference to the cottage on Milvia Street in Berkeley, California, where many of the poems in Howl and Other Poems were composed, including "A Strange New Cottage in Berkeley".

=== Footnote to "Howl" ===
Line	Reference
"Everyday is in eternity!"	A reference to "Auguries of Innocence" by Blake: "Hold Infinity in the palm of your hand/And Eternity in an hour.”
"Holy Peter holy Allen holy Solomon holy Lucien holy Kerouac holy Huncke holy Burroughs holy Cassady ..."	Peter Orlovsky, Allen Ginsberg, Carl Solomon, Lucien Carr, Jack Kerouac, Herbert Huncke, William S. Burroughs, and Neal Cassady.
"Holy the Fifth International"	A reference to four "Internationals", meetings of Communist, Socialist, and/or Labor groups. The First International was headed by Karl Marx and Frederick Engels in 1864. The Fourth International was a meeting of Trotskyists in 1938. The Fifth International, Ginsberg would claim, is yet to come.

== Critical reception ==
The New York Times sent Richard Eberhart to San Francisco in 1956 to report on the poetry scene there. The result of Eberhart's visit was an article published in the September 2, 1956 New York Times Book Review titled "West Coast Rhythms". Eberhart's piece helped call national attention to "Howl" as "the most remarkable poem of the young group" of poets who were becoming known as the spokespersons of the Beat Generation.

On October 7, 2005, celebrations marking the 50th anniversary of the first reading of the poem were staged in San Francisco, New York City, and in Leeds in the UK. The British event, Howl for Now, was accompanied by a book of essays of the same name, edited by Simon Warner and published by Route Publishing (Howl for Now ISBN 1-901927-25-3) reflecting on the piece's enduring influence.

=== 1997 broadcasting controversy ===
Boston independent alternative rock radio station WFNX became the first commercial radio station to broadcast "Howl" on Friday, July 18, 1997, at 6:00 p.m. despite Federal Communications Commission (FCC) Safe Harbor laws which allow for mature content later at night.

=== 2007 broadcasting fears ===
In late August 2007, Ron Collins, Lawrence Ferlinghetti, Nancy Peters, Bill Morgan, Peter Hale, David Skover, Al Bendich (one of Ferlinghetti's lawyers in the 1957 obscenity trial), and Eliot Katz petitioned Pacifica Radio to air Ginsberg's Howl on October 3, 2007, to commemorate the 50th anniversary of the verdict declaring the poem to be protected under the First Amendment against charges of obscenity. Fearing fines from the FCC, Pacifica New York radio station WBAI opted not to broadcast the poem. The station chose instead to play the poem on a special webcast program, replete with commentary (by Bob Holman, Regina Weinreich and Ron Collins, narrated by Janet Coleman), on October 3, 2007.

== Legacy ==
Part II of the poem was used as libretto for Song #7 in Hydrogen Jukebox, a 1990 chamber opera using a selection of Ginsberg's poems set to music by Philip Glass. The title itself comes from the poem: "...listening to the crack of doom on the hydrogen jukebox..." The first line of the poem, "I saw the best minds of my generation destroyed by madness, starving hysterical ..." was also used as the opening line in the song "I Should Be Allowed to Think" by They Might Be Giants. A paraphrased and altered version of the quote, "I've seen the best minds of my generation... fixable" can be heard during the interlude of Machinehead by Bush (often recited live as "I've seen the best minds of my generation, starving, hysterical, naked"). Tav Falco recites the opening lines in the Panther Burns' 1981 version of Bourgeois Blues.

The opening of the poem was also recited by Richard Moll in the 1981 movie American Pop and by Lana Del Rey in her 2013 short film Tropico.

== Film ==
The 2010 film Howl explored Ginsberg's life and works. Constructed in a nonlinear fashion, the film juxtaposes historical events with a variety of cinematic techniques. It reconstructs the early life of Ginsberg during the 1940s and 1950s. It also re-enacts Ginsberg's debut performance of "Howl" at the Six Gallery Reading on October 7, 1955, in black-and-white. Parts of the poem are interpreted through animated sequences, and the events are juxtaposed with color images of Ferlinghetti's 1957 obscenity trial.
