= City Lights Pocket Poets Series =

Series of poetry collections

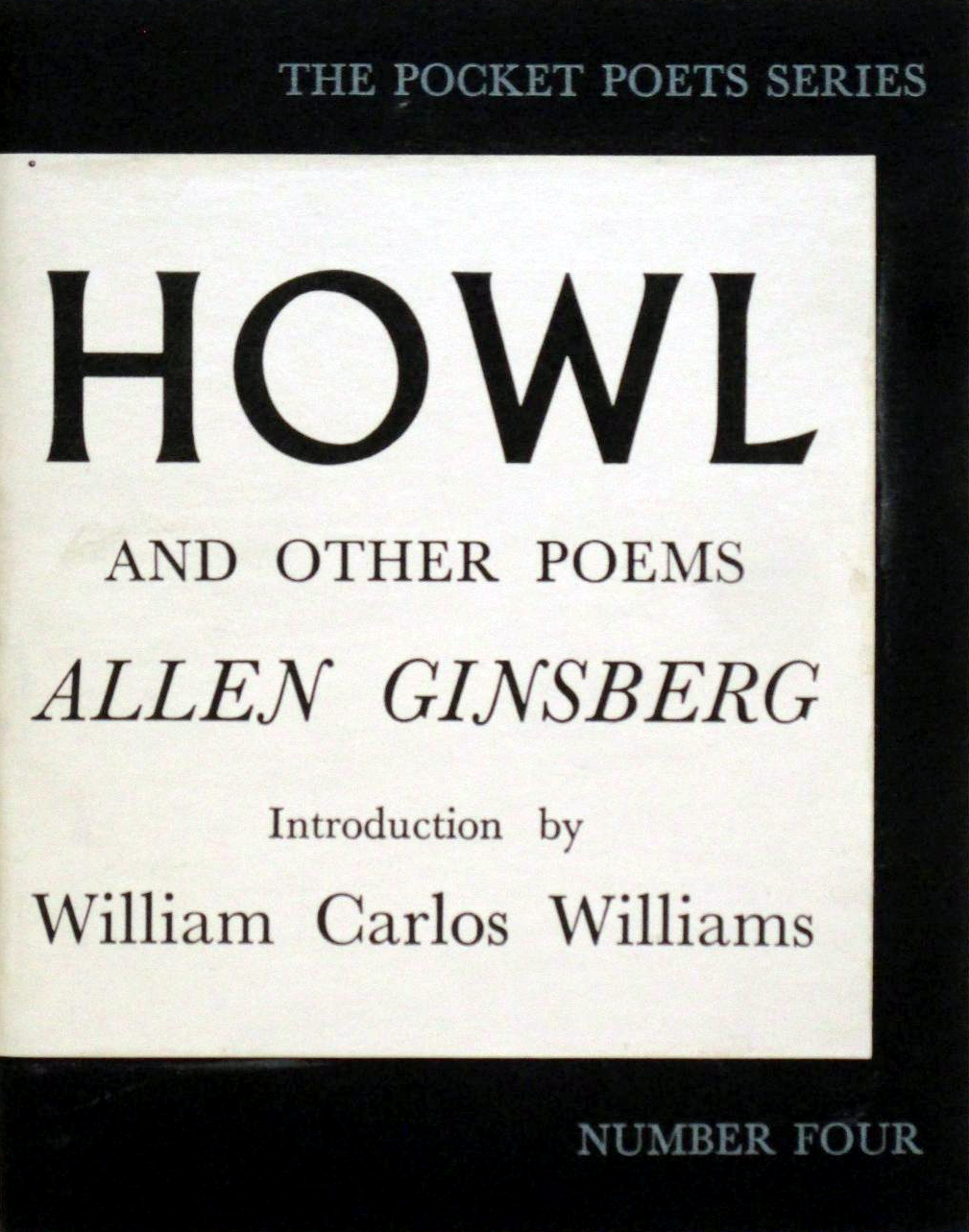
Howl and Other Poems was published in the fall of 1956 as number four in the Pocket Poets Series from City Lights Books

The City Lights Pocket Poets Series is a series of poetry collections published by Lawrence Ferlinghetti and City Lights Books of San Francisco since August 1955.

The series included Allen Ginsberg's literary milestone "Howl", which led to an obscenity charge for the publishers that was fought off with the aid of the ACLU.

The series is published in a small, affordable paperback format, some numbers being also published in hardback.

The series gave many readers their first introduction to avant-garde poetry. Many of the poets were members of the Beat Generation and the San Francisco Renaissance, but the volumes included a diverse array of poets, including authors translated from Spanish, German, Russian, and Dutch. According to Ferlinghetti: "From the beginning the aim was to publish across the board, avoiding the provincial and the academic... I had in mind rather an international, dissident, insurgent ferment."

== List of books in the City Lights Pocket Poets Series ==
1. Lawrence Ferlinghetti, Pictures of the Gone World, August 1955 (reissued & expanded, 1995; 60th Anniversary Edition, 2015)
2. Kenneth Rexroth (translator), Thirty Spanish Poems of Love and Exile, 1956 (Guillén, Alberti, Lorca, Machado , Neruda, Plaja, Brull, and others)
3. Kenneth Patchen, Poems of Humor and Protest, 1956
4. Allen Ginsberg, Howl and Other Poems, 1956 (hardcover 40th Anniversary Edition, 1996)
5. Marie Ponsot, True Minds, 1956
6. Denise Levertov, Here and Now, 1957
7. William Carlos Williams, Kora in Hell: Improvisations, 1957
8. Gregory Corso, Gasoline, 1958 (reissued with The Vestal Lady on Brattle, 1978)
9. Jacques Prévert, Lawrence Ferlinghetti (translator), Paroles, 1958 (reissued bilingually, 1990)
10. Robert Duncan, Selected Poems, 1959
11. Jerome Rothenberg (translator), New Young German Poets, 1959
12. Nicanor Parra, Jorge Elliott (translator), Anti-Poems, 1960
13. Kenneth Patchen, The Love Poems of Kenneth Patchen, 1960
14. Allen Ginsberg, Kaddish and Other Poems, 1961 (reissued 50th Anniversary Edition, 2010)
15. Robert Nichols, Slow Newsreel of Man Riding Train, 1962
16. Anselm Hollo (editor & translator), Red Cats, 1962
17. Malcolm Lowry, Selected Poems of Malcolm Lowry, 1962 (re-edited and reissued, 2017)
18. Allen Ginsberg, Reality Sandwiches, 1963
19. Frank O'Hara, Lunch Poems, 1964 (reissued 50th Anniversary Edition, 2014)
20. Philip Lamantia, Selected Poems 1943–1966, 1967
21. Bob Kaufman, Golden Sardine, 1967
22. Janine Pommy-Vega, Poems to Fernando, 1968
23. Allen Ginsberg, Planet News, 1968
24. Charles Upton, Panic Grass, 1968
25. Pablo Picasso, Hunk of Skin, 1968
26. Robert Bly, The Teeth-Mother Naked at Last, 1970
27. Diane DiPrima, Revolutionary Letters Etc., 1971
28. Jack Kerouac, Ann Charters (editor) Scattered Poems, 1971
29. Andrei Voznesensky, Dogalypse: San Francisco Poetry Reading, 1972
30. Allen Ginsberg, The Fall of America: Poems of These States 1965–1971, 1972
31. Pete Winslow, A Daisy in the Memory of a Shark, 1973
32. Harold Norse, Hotel Nirvana, 1974
33. Anne Waldman, Fast Speaking Woman & Other Chants, 1975 (reissued & expanded, 1996)
34. Jack Hirschman, Lyripol, 1976
35. Allen Ginsberg, Mind Breaths, 1977
36. Stefan Brecht, Poems, 1978
37. Peter Orlovsky, Clean Asshole Poems & Smiling Vegetable Songs, 1978
38. Antler, Factory, 1980
39. Philip Lamantia, Becoming Visible, 1981
40. Allen Ginsberg, Plutonian Ode, 1982
41. Pier Paolo Pasolini, Lawrence Ferlinghetti and Francesca Valente (translators), Roman Poems, 1986 (reissued bilingually, 2005)
42. Scott Rollins (editor), Nine Dutch Poets, 1982
43. Ernesto Cardenal, Jonathan Cohen (translator), From Nicaragua with Love: Poems, 1986
44. Antonio Porta, Anthony Molino (translator), Kisses from Another Dream, 1987
45. Adam Cornford, Animations, 1988
46. La Loca, Adventures on the Isle of Adolescence, 1989
47. Vladimir Mayakovsky, Maria Enzensberger (translator), Listen! Early Poems, 1991
48. Jack Kerouac, Pomes All Sizes, 1992
49. Daisy Zamora, Barbara Paschke (translator), Riverbed of Memory, 1992
50. Rosario Murillo, Alejandro Murguía (translator), Angel in the Deluge, 1992
51. Jack Kerouac, The Scripture of the Golden Eternity, 1994
52. Alberto Blanco, Juvenal Acosta (editor), Dawn of the Senses, 1995
53. Julio Cortázar, Save Twilight, 1997 (reissued in an expanded edition, 2016)
54. Dino Campana, Orphic Songs, 1998
55. Jack Hirschman, Front Lines, 2002
56. Semezdin Mehmedinovic, Nine Alexandrias, 2003
57. Kamau Daáood, The Language of Saxophones, 2005
58. Cristina Peri Rossi, State of Exile, 2008
59. Philip Lamantia, Tau and John Hoffman, Journey to the End, 2008
60. David Meltzer, When I Was a Poet, 2011
61. Tongo Eisen-Martin, Heaven Is All Goodbyes, 2017
62. Tongo Eisen-Martin, Blood on the Fog, 2021
63. Will Alexander, Divine Blue Light (for John Coltrane), 2022
64. Nasser Rabah, Ammiel Alcalay, Emna Zghal, & Khaled al-Hilli (translators) Gaza: The Poem Said Its Piece, 2025
