= Howl (2010 film) =

2010 American film by Jeffrey Friedman and Rob Epstein

- Theatrical release poster
- Directed by: Rob Epstein; Jeffrey Friedman
- Written by: Rob Epstein; Jeffrey Friedman
- Produced by: Rob Epstein; Jeffrey Friedman; Elizabeth Redleaf; Christine Walker; Gus Van Sant; Jawal Nga
- Starring: James Franco; David Strathairn; Jon Hamm; Bob Balaban; Alessandro Nivola; Treat Williams; Jon Prescott; Aaron Tveit; Mary-Louise Parker; Jeff Daniels
- Cinematography: Edward Lachman
- Edited by: Jake Pushinsky; Stan Webb (animation)
- Music by: Carter Burwell
- Production company: Werc Werk Works
- Distributed by: Oscilloscope Laboratories
- Release dates: January 21, 2010 (Sundance); September 24, 2010 (United States)
- Running time: 85 minutes
- Country: United States
- Language: English
- Box office: $1.1 million

Howl is a 2010 American film which explores both the 1955 Six Gallery debut and the 1957 obscenity trial of 20th-century American poet Allen Ginsberg's noted poem "Howl". The film is written and directed by Rob Epstein and Jeffrey Friedman and stars James Franco as Ginsberg.

== Plot ==
Howl explores the life and works of 20th-century American poet, Allen Ginsberg. Constructed in a nonlinear fashion, the film juxtaposes historical events with a variety of cinematic techniques. It reconstructs the early life of Ginsberg during the 1940s and 1950s. It also re-enacts Ginsberg's debut performance of "Howl" at the Six Gallery Reading on October 7, 1955 in black-and-white. The reading was the first important public manifestation of the Beat Generation and helped to herald the West Coast literary revolution that became known as the San Francisco Renaissance. In addition, parts of the poem are interpreted through animated sequences. Finally, these events are juxtaposed with color images of the 1957 obscenity trial of San Francisco poet and City Lights Bookstore co-founder, Lawrence Ferlinghetti, who was the first person to publish "Howl" in Howl and Other Poems.

== Cast ==
- James Franco as Allen Ginsberg, a central figure of the Beat Generation
- Aaron Tveit as Peter Orlovsky, fellow poet and Ginsberg's life partner for over forty years
- Jon Hamm as Jake Ehrlich, Ginsberg's prominent defense attorney, whose slogan was "Never plead guilty" and whose life inspired the TV series Perry Mason
- David Strathairn as Ralph McIntosh, prosecuting attorney
- Alessandro Nivola as Luther Nichols, literary critic/book editor of the San Francisco Chronicle and defense witness
- Mary-Louise Parker as Gail Potter, radio personality and prosecution witness
- Bob Balaban as Judge Clayton W. Horn
- Jeff Daniels as Professor David Kirk
- Jon Prescott as Neal Cassady
- Treat Williams as Mark Schorer
- Todd Rotondi as Jack Kerouac
- Andrew Rogers as Lawrence Ferlinghetti

== Production ==
Principal photography of the film took place in New York City. Animation was produced by John Hays, Monk Studios, and designed by Eric Drooker, a former street artist who had collaborated with Ginsberg on his final book of poetry, Illuminated Poems.

== Reception ==
=== Critical response ===
Howl received an overall approval rating of 63% from critics at Rotten Tomatoes, based on 105 reviews, with an average rating of 6.4/10. The website's critical consensus reads, "James Franco gives it his all as beat poet Allen Ginsberg, but Howl never develops enough of a focus to do his performance justice." On Metacritic, the film had an average score of 63 out of 100, based on 24 reviews, indicating "generally favorable" reviews.

Roger Ebert gave the film three stars and stated that actor James Franco portrays Allen Ginsberg with "restraint and care." David Edelstein of New York magazine noted that "Since the Sundance opening of James Franco's take on Allen Ginsberg in Howl, I'd heard the movie was howlingly bad — which makes me think that some of the best critical minds of my generation have been destroyed by cynicism. The film... is an exhilarating tribute from one form (cinema) to another (poetry). It takes Ginsberg's momentous, paradigm-changing poem as its launching pad and landing place; its beginning, middle, and end. You could call it a deconstruction except that sounds too formal. It's a celebration, an analysis, a critical essay, an ode." A.O. Scott of the New York Times noted that "'Howl' is an exemplary work of literary criticism on film, explaining and contextualizing its source without deadening it." Damien Magee of 702 ABC Sydney gave the film three and a half stars out of five and argued that "James Franco is, in a word, perfect" in the role of Ginsberg. Whilst Magee expressed misgivings about the film's tone, he insists that "there is more than enough that is truly great about Howl for me to recommend it highly". Mick LaSalle of the San Francisco Chronicle found it to be a film of "passion and ambition" but also suggested that its "success is intermittent at best."

=== Criticism ===
Dismay has been expressed that a characterization of Shig Murao was left out of the film. According to his biographer, Patricia Wakida, Murao was "the one who was actually arrested by the San Francisco police for selling Howl and actually goes to jail. Ginsberg was in Tangier and Ferlinghetti was in Big Sur. Shig was the one who took the fall".

=== Accolades ===
- Won: Central Ohio Film Critics Association - Actor of the Year, James Franco (2011)
- Won: National Board of Review, USA - Freedom of Expression Award (2010)
- Nominated: International Cinephile Society Awards - Best Animated Film (2011)
- Nominated: GLAAD Media Awards - Outstanding Film - Limited Release (2011)
- Nominated: Berlin International Film Festival - Golden Berlin Bear (2010)
- Nominated: Sundance Film Festival - Grand Jury Prize (2010)
- Nominated: World Soundtrack Awards - Soundtrack Composer of the Year (2010)
- Nominated: Dorian Awards - Performance of the Year, James Franco (2010)

== See also ==
- Walter Van T. Clark, author prominently featured in newspaper clipping
- The Source-The 1999 documentary about the Beat Generation
- United States in the 1950s
