= Hadda Be Playing on the Jukebox =

Poem by Allen Ginsberg

"Hadda be Playin' on the Jukebox" is a poem written by Allen Ginsberg in 1975.

== Background ==
Many of the themes of "Hadda be Playin' on the Jukebox" were recurring in Ginsberg's poetry. Police violence, student revolt and corporations, for example, had been previously touched on in his 1974 "Thoughts on a Breath", and conspiracies surrounding the state security apparatus would be explored in 1980, in "Birdbrain!". That same year, in "Capitol Air", he would compare America's Attica with Russia's "Lubyanka wall". Ginsberg's own view on both his political poems and the events they describe was occasionally critical. In Indian Journals, he wrote "I shouldn't waste my time on America like this. It may be patriotic / but it isn't good art".

== Subject and style ==
The poem frames various events of the 1960s and 1970s, including the Kennedy assassination and the Kent State massacre, as part of a larger trend. Ginsberg refers to the Cold War as "gang wars across oceans", and calls capitalism a "vortex of this rage" and a competition "man to man."

One of Ginsberg's "spontaneous" poems, it has a "long-breathed rolling rhythm", with an emphasis on hard, single facts presented one at a time over an ever-increasing energy. The poem reflects, too, says Paul Berman, Ginsberg's sense of "impotence" at being unable to change—or even convey—the "hypocrisy and criminality" he saw in American foreign policy and domestic politics. Hilton Kramer posits that although a motif of conspiracy runs through the poem, Ginsberg is not actually supporting such a view of history as factual; rather, he is demonstrating "what runaway paranoia looks like."

The reiterated phrase "Hadda be..." (Note: This is a literary technique known as anaphora, or "repeating certain phrases again and again for historical effect".) is heard at the beginning of every line, giving each line rhythm, It has been taken to indicate a sense of futility by Ginsberg, in that there was nothing anyone could have done to have prevented the litany of outrages he described, and yet which remorselessly occurred. Possibly, suggests Berman, it is also indicating Ginsberg's sorrow: "as if he were saying, 'Why did it have to be you, America, that these things happened to?'"

=== Organizations and events referenced ===
- NKVD - CIA
- OGPU - DIA
- KGB - FBI
- Attica Prison Riots
- Bay of Pigs Invasion
- Cold War
- Kennedy assassination
- Kent State shootings
- Vietnam War

=== People referenced ===
- Frank Costello
- Rockefeller
- J. Edgar Hoover
- John F. Kennedy
- Kissinger
- Lucky Luciano

== Critical reception ==
Willard Spiegelman has described "Hadda be Playin' on the Jukebox" as a rap poem utilising what appears to be "an improvised set of variations". The poem, says Spiegelman, begins relatively neutrally but becomes increasingly political: "a denunciation of organised crime and its connections to national politics".

Ginsberg's technique is to comment with ever-increasing belligerence regarding events of ever-increasing significance.

It concludes with a critical note referencing the United States' role on the world stage, and ends in a "final vision of international mayhem".

== Publication and reworking ==
=== Publication ===
"Hadda Be Playin' On The Jukebox" was first published in 1978 as part of Mind Breaths. This was a collection of poetry Ginsberg had written between 1972 and 1977. It was number 35 in the City Lights Pocket Poets series.

=== Reworking ===
It has been performed live, with accompanying music, by the rap metal band Rage Against the Machine, appearing on their album Live & Rare, originally a Japan-only release in 1998.
