= The Source (1999 film) =

The Source is a 1999 documentary film directed by Chuck Workman.

== Summary ==
The film is about the Beat Generation (which originated in the 1940s) and its impact on the counterculture movements from the 1960s-70s onwards. It features appearances by Johnny Depp (dressed as Jack Kerouac reciting excerpts from On the Road), Dennis Hopper (dressed as William S. Burroughs reciting excerpts from Naked Lunch) and John Turturro (dressed as Allen Ginsberg reciting excerpts from Howl) intermixed with archival stock footage and excerpts from various films and shows like Jeopardy (where an entire category is dedicated to the Beats) and Saturday Night Live.

Many poets and writers of the era appear on camera, including Ginsberg, Burroughs, Gary Snyder, Gregory Corso, Ken Kesey, Robert Creeley, Michael McClure, Lawrence Ferlinghetti, Timothy Leary, Diane DiPrima, Ed Sanders, David Amram, Jack Micheline and Herbert Huncke. Contemporary artists who admire and were influenced by the Beats also are interviewed and/or perform poetry, including Jerry Garcia, Henry Rollins, Robert Motherwell, Norman Mailer, Terry Southern, Paul Krassner, Philip Glass, Joan Baez, Jim Carroll, Lydia Lunch, Ann Charters and Jack Kerouac's daughter, Jan Kerouac.

Because of the large amount of film and music clips used, more than three years elapsed between the completion of the film and its release in order to obtain the vast number of copyrights. In the interim, Ginsberg, Burroughs, Huncke, Micheline, Leary, Southern, Garcia and Jan Kerouac all died.

== Reception ==
The film received positive acclaim with an 88% on Rotten Tomatoes.

Janet Maslin of The New York Times praised the film, stating:

"A stirring, kaleidoscopic documentary about the Beat generation and its legacy... spans from the exultant 1940s photo of the young friends of Jack Kerouac, Allen Ginsberg, and William Burroughs to the Jeopardy show on which contestants could win money by asking 'Who were the Beats?'" 'It's eternity all the time, so there's no point being nostalgic for eternity,' Ginsberg is heard saying. But that wisdom runs counter to the moving experience of watching this film unfold."

Gary Morris of Bright Lights Journal, however, states that the "intriguing yet shallow" documentary is less a linear biography of the movement than a kind of "Beat chic" sampler.

== See also ==
- Howl, a 2010 film starring James Franco as Allen Ginsberg
- United States in the 1950s
- On the Road, a 2012 adaptation of Kerouac's magnum opus
