= Francis Van Wie =

American streetcar conductor

- Francis Van Wie, staged photograph for press coverage following his 1952 arrest for bigamy (21 Aug 1952)
- Born: 1886; Madison, Wisconsin
- Died: 1973 (aged 86–87); Lake Elsinore, California
- Other names: Car Barn Casanova; Ding Dong Daddy of the D-car Line; Trolley Toreador
- Occupation: Streetcar conductor
- Known for: serial bigamy

Francis Harrison Van Wie (Born 1886 - Died 1973) was a streetcar conductor for the Market Street Railway and its successor, the Municipal Railway in San Francisco, who was famed for romancing and marrying as many as twelve women without divorce by the time he was arrested in 1945 for bigamy. Local press coverage of his arrest and trial gave him colorful, alliterative nicknames, including the Ding Dong Daddy of the D-car Line, the Trolley Toreador, and the Car Barn Casanova.

== Marriages and career ==
Van Wie stated his first marriage was in 1904 or 1905 to Elizabeth Kexel in Wisconsin. He had one daughter, Mabel Josephine, with Kexel and was told in 1912 that he could not have any more children, so he encouraged his next wives to adopt. His second marriage was to Clara Heise in 1913. From an early age, Van Wie said that he had a poor memory because of chronic headaches. In 1915, Heise had him arrested in Chicago for non-support of his son; after discovering he had not divorced Kexel, the two wives jointly had him arrested for bigamy that July. That year, Van Wie also was arrested in Kenosha, Wisconsin for telling the state legislature that a chiropractor had cured his amnesia, according to a telegram from his son; the senior Van Wie claimed he had forgotten about his first wife and child because of his faulty memory. Later, Van Wie said that Kexel had abandoned him after six or seven years of marriage: "She said she was going to get a divorce and I assumed she had." He said that he served in the Army from 1917 to 1918, when he received a medical discharge.

Van Wie also claimed to have worked as a lion tamer and house painter. Reportedly, he had been discovered asleep and unharmed one morning in the cage of a lion named "Old Mary" during his 14-year career with the Ringling Brothers Circus. At the time, he was married to his fifth wife, Mabel Joyce, since 1922, and together they had a mindreading act for the circus. Mabel was described as a beautiful redhead who worked as an artist's model and sideshow performer, but Van Wie claimed she "wasn't particularly pretty and we just drifted apart." He came to California in 1932 with Mabel and worked shoveling coal. Although initial reporting said Mabel was his third wife, two additional wives were discovered between Clara and Mabel during his 1945 bigamy trial. In 1939, he was arrested for abandoning Mabel after seventeen years of marriage. Van Wie would later recount that "after my fifth wife [Mabel] ... I just seem to have gone haywire. I can not explain anything right now."

In 1941, Van Wie began working for the Market Street Railway. Aged 58 when he was arrested in 1945 for bigamy, Van Wie was too old to be drafted to fight in World War II and was working the rear platform of San Francisco streetcars, where he could socialize with passengers away from the front platform, which had a prominent sign warning people not to talk to the motorman. After meeting Sadie Levin, they were married on February 28, 1941; in March 1942 she told him he was pregnant and when he showed up to meet her on May 8, he was wearing an army uniform, claimed to have been busy in Hawaii investigating the attack on Pearl Harbor, said he was sterile, and accused her of having an affair. As a conductor, the pace of his marriages quickened; he married Juliana Voloshin in 1942, Myrtle Martha Wheeler in 1943, and three additional wives in 1944, all without stopping to divorce his prior wives; one of the 1944 wives said he told her he had been lonely since a previous wife he had married in 1940, Ruth La Crosse, had died in an auto accident, bringing his count to eight wives in total.

=== Bigamy trial ===
"I've just been looking for something I never was able to find—a real pal and companion. I just wanted a home and kept trying to find one."

— Francis Van Wie, statement at Jan 29, 1945 hearing

On January 23, 1945, the police announced they were looking for Van Wie, who the press dubbed the "Carline Casanova", for three bigamy warrants and possible impersonation of authority, as one of his wives reported he was away from home so much "because he was an FBI man." Van Wie had disappeared from his job a week earlier on January 16. His bigamy was discovered after Voloshin (then thought to be his fifth wife) filed a suit for divorce; she then learned that he had married two times in 1944 alone.

Van Wie was arrested by police for bigamy on January 25, 1945, in Los Angeles, acting on a tip from an alert guard who "wondered how a little guy like that could marry so many women"; at the time, he was charged with having nine wives, although records indicated he had been married as many as twelve times since 1913, having divorced one wife, annulled another marriage, and survived the death of a third. Around this time, Stanton Delaplane, a columnist for the San Francisco Chronicle, gave him his most enduring nickname, calling Van Wie the "Ding Dong Daddy of the D-car Line", after the song "I'm a Ding Dong Daddy from Dumas" popularized by Louis Armstrong. Although Delaplane's nickname gave him credit for serving the D Geary-Van Ness line, that appellation had been chosen for its alliteration. Later research indicated that Van Wie probably worked the 22-Fillmore line. Delaplane won a 1946 National Headliner Award for his coverage of Van Wie.

When he was arrested, Van Wie stated in his defense that he had been seeking "a happy home and contentment" and contemporary press coverage was favorable with reporters seemingly bemused by his seeming romantic success. Van Wie said he couldn't "imagine any of [my wives] being that mad at me" and added that he was married so often simply because he was unfailingly polite and "the [conductor's] hat that did it. It represented the authority that went with the job and the steady weekly paycheck that went with it." However, several wives reported that his ardor cooled quickly after a few weeks of marriage—Van Wie would become abusive and jealous, then abandon their homes; one wife stated flatly that "Frank's a card in the parlor, a gentleman on the street, and a beast in the home." Voloshin, who he married in 1941 or 1942 was credited with tipping off several successor wives they were not his one and only and described his inexplicable charm: "There was something about him that made you do things you didn't want to do, but I never want to see him again." Both Voloshin and Van Wie claimed the other was physically abusive to them.

The prosecution at the initial hearing was handled by then-San Francisco District Attorney (and future Governor of California) Pat Brown; Van Wie pleaded he was innocent at his initial hearing on January 29 before Judge Leo Cunningham, who reduced his bail to US$1,000 from US$2,500. By that time, his marriage count had grown to twelve. After listening to the hearing, his eleventh and twelfth wives (who he had married in April and December 1944) filed for annulment. Van Wie was represented by defense attorney James Toner; another prominent local attorney, Jake Ehrlich, was also present to represent the "Ding Dong Daddy defense fund", provided by wealthy donors who were amused by his story. The defense fund paid for his bail and his stay in Room 707 of the Padre Hotel, where he resided while awaiting his court date. On February 1 Van Wie said he would change his plea to guilty and ask for probation; Judge Cunningham instead held him over for trial on three counts of bigamy, increasing his bail to US$3,000 cash or US$7,500 bond, remarking that since it was unlikely he could afford that amount, "it would be wise, perhaps, if he spent some days in jail, for some serious thinking."

The jury was seated for his trial on March 19 and Van Wie made a double plea of not guilty and not guilty by reason of insanity, but the jury found him guilty after ten minutes of deliberation on March 22, 1945. The prosecution asserted he had married Sadie Levin in February 1941, then subsequently married Myrtle Wheeler, Mary Bergman, and Evelyn Brown within fifteen months between 1943 and 1944 without first divorcing Levin. Van Wie's defense team did not contest the 1943–44 marriages, but appealed the verdict, saying the marriage to Levin was itself invalid as a bigamous marriage. When he married Levin, he promised he would divorce an earlier wife named Mabel and disappeared for six weeks to do so, saying he was headed for Reno and sending her a newspaper clipping proving he had divorced Mabel; Levin later found out he had gone to Sacramento instead and when she accused him of lying, he said that Mabel had died before he married Levin.

After a separate trial, the same jury found him sane on April 3 after deliberating for 55 minutes. During his insanity trial, he testified that his latest (twelfth or thirteenth) wife, Evelyn Brown, was the "only real love of [his] life" and his defense relied on several incidents of head trauma due to a mule kick, an axe blow, and a fall from a smokestack. However, the three psychiatrists that testified were summarized as concluding he was "slightly on the psychopathic side but not insane." Evelyn sent him an Easter card during the second trial, which made him "very happy"; although she had forgiven him, she said she would never go back to him.

He was fined US$3 and sentenced to 30 years imprisonment by Judge Herbert Kaufman on April 5, who ordered the three ten-year sentences to be served consecutively. The Court of Appeals of California (First Dist., Div. One) rejected the appeal and upheld the guilty and sane verdicts in December: "If [the defendant] establishes the invalidity of the prior marriage by proving a valid earlier marriage and does not establish that this earlier marriage was dissolved prior to the dates of the alleged bigamous marriages, he is still guilty of bigamy."

Van Wie served two years at San Quentin State Prison before he was paroled and released on April 12, 1947, after good behavior and a plea for leniency from Judge Kaufman. Upon his release, he asked his defense attorney, James Toner, to check if all his prior marriages had been concluded.

=== After release ===
In September 1949, he was married again (for the fourteenth time) to Mrs. Mary Aba by Judge Kaufman, who previously had asked that Van Wie abstain from marriage for five years as a condition of his release. At the time, Van Wie said "this is the real thing and this is going to be the last one for me", but a month later, Aba complained to Judge Kaufman that Van Wie was simultaneously too amorous and stingy; by February 1950, she told the Judge that she planned to file for divorce: "Our love nest is over and I'm moving out."

In August 1952, Van Wie again made headlines for suspecting that he had again committed bigamy with his recent fifteenth marriage to Amelia Pritchard upon learning his divorce with Aba had never completed; Pritchard had locked him out of their apartment upon learning of his infamous past. He was arrested a week later for bigamy while appearing in the show "My True Love Life", staged at the El Rey burlesque theater in Oakland. It turned out that Pritchard was actually his sixteenth wife: after Aba, a fifteenth wife, Martha Moyle of Long Beach, learned from the prior week's news story that he had married Pritchard in Las Vegas without divorcing Moyle first. When he was arrested, Van Wie blurted "All I can say—" onstage before his attorney escorted him to waiting police officers, and he was forced to stand trial again. Van Wie's marriages continued to gather press coverage in later years, including in 1953, when he simultaneously annulled his fourteenth (Aba) and sixteenth (Pritchard) marriages. Authorities arrested Van Wie in April 1959 for violating his probation after discovering he had married his eighteenth wife in August 1958; at the time, he was being pursued for abandoning his seventeenth wife.

After that, Van Wie's marital status was not publicized and he died in 1973.

== Legacy ==
In 1997, the Cherry Poppin' Daddies released their album Zoot Suit Riot with the song "Ding Dong Daddy of the D-car Line" inspired by Van Wie.
