= Chuck Workman =

American documentary filmmaker

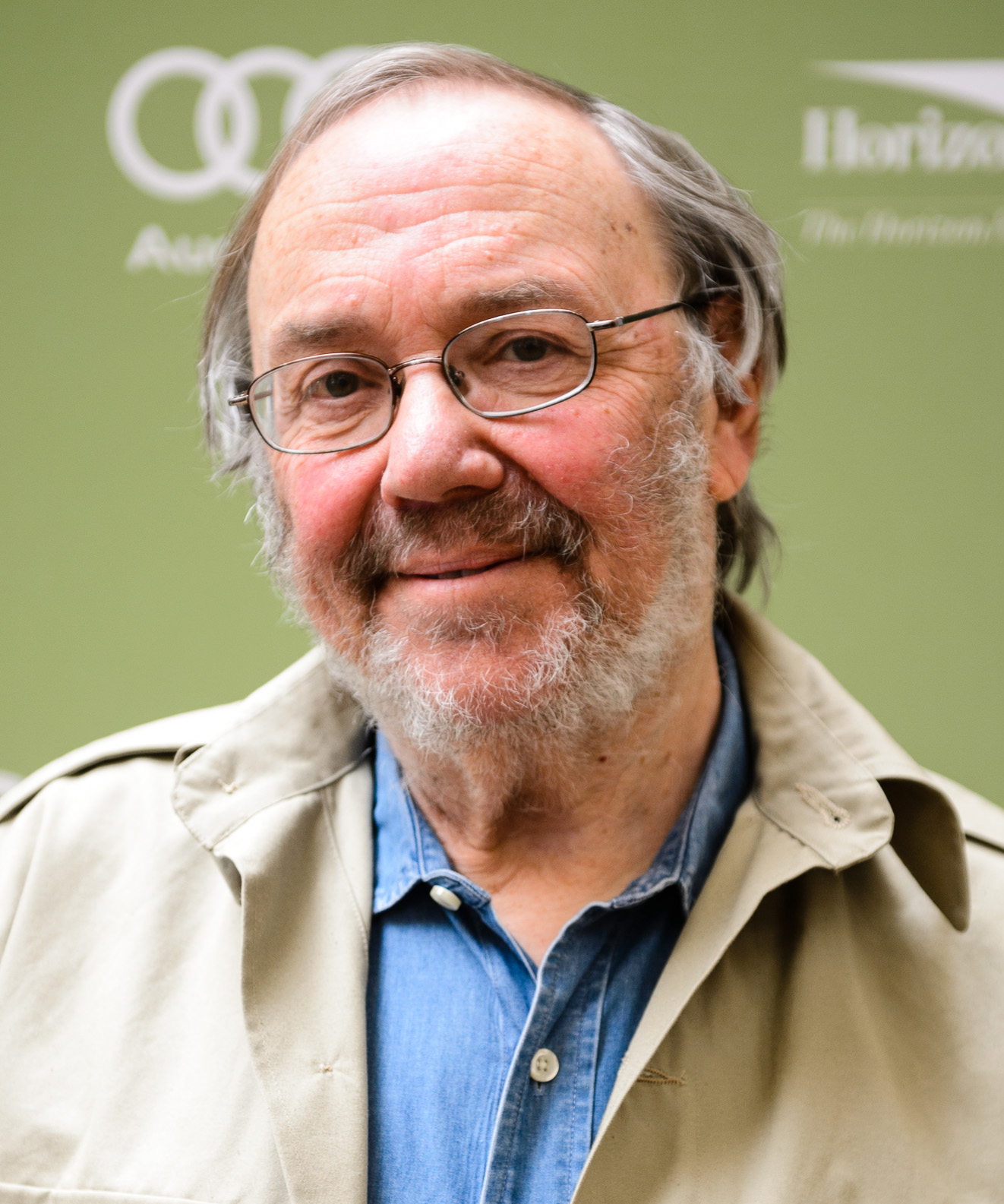
- Occupation: Filmmaker
- Known for: Precious Images, The Source

Chuck Workman is a documentary filmmaker from Philadelphia, Pennsylvania. His 1986 film Precious Images won an Academy Award for Best Live Action Short Film; his work has also been nominated for Emmy Awards, Sundance Film Festival awards, and the Taos Talking Film Festival awards.

Workman frequently creates the montages seen on the televised Academy Awards shows, including the in memoriam segment. He is sometimes credited as Carl Workman. He is the father of filmmaker Jeremy Workman.

== Selected filmography ==
- 1984: The Director and the Image
- 1984: The Director and the Actor
- 1986: Precious Images (2009 National Film Registry inductee)
- 1986: Stoogemania
- 1987: The Best Show in Town
- 1987: Words
- 1989: 50 Years of Bugs Bunny in 3½ Minutes
- 1994: 100 Years at the Movies
- 1999: The Source
- 2003: A House on a Hill
- 2010: Visionaries
- 2013: What Is Cinema?
- 2014: Magician: The Astonishing Life and Work of Orson Welles
