= Carl Solomon =

American writer (1928–1993)

- Born: March 30, 1928; Bronx, New York City
- Died: February 26, 1993 (aged 64); Bronx, New York City

Carl Solomon (March 30, 1928 – February 26, 1993) was an American writer. One of his best-known pieces of writing is Report from the Asylum: Afterthoughts of a Shock Patient.

== Biography ==
Solomon was born in the New York City borough of the Bronx. His father's death in 1939 profoundly affected his early life. Solomon later said, "I drifted into indiscipline and intellectual adventure that eventually became complete confusion." Graduating from high school at 15, Solomon attended the City College of New York (CCNY) for a short time before joining the United States Maritime Service in 1944. In his travels overseas, Solomon was exposed to Surrealism and Dada, which inspired him throughout his life. In Paris, he witnessed Antonin Artaud give a screaming poetry reading. This so impressed him that he remained a disciple of Artaud for much of his life. It was shortly after this period that Solomon was voluntarily institutionalized, a gesture he made as a Dadaist symbol of defeat.

Solomon first met Beat poet Allen Ginsberg in the waiting room of the New York State Psychiatric Institute. Ginsberg dedicated his 1955 poem Howl to Solomon. The poem's third section uses the refrain "I'm with you in Rockland", an institution Solomon never attended. Solomon had many complaints about Ginsberg and Howl, including that he was "never in Rockland" and that the third section of the poem "garbles history completely". The reference to Rockland appears to be a poetic fabrication. Ginsberg likely used the name because it was more appropriate and emphatic than "New York State Hospital" or "Pilgrim" (Pilgrim Psychiatric Center, another psychiatric hospital to which Solomon was admitted). The poem's first section immortalizes a few of Solomon's personal exploits, such as the line "who threw potato salad at CCNY lecturers on Dadaism and subsequently presented themselves on the granite steps of the madhouse with shaven heads and harlequin speech of suicide, demanding instantaneous lobotomy."

It was at Ginsberg's insistence that William S. Burroughs's first novel, Junkie (1953), was published by Ace Books. Solomon's uncle, Aaron A. Wyn, owned Ace Books, a purveyor of pulp fiction and nonfiction paperbacks. Solomon worked for Ace and was responsible for the Publisher's Note in the first printing of Junkie, as well as the Introduction to the 1964 reprinting.

One of Solomon's best-known pieces of writing is Report from the Asylum: Afterthoughts of a Shock Patient. It is an account of the electroconvulsive therapy used to treat patients in asylums, drawn directly from personal experience. It was written with Artaud somewhat in mind, because he had received the same treatment while unjustly institutionalized by the French government. The piece was included in the 50th-anniversary Howl facsimile, in an appendix.

In the late 1960s, Solomon published two chapbooks of prose poetry with Mary Beach's Beach Books, Texts & Documents, distributed by City Lights Books: Mishaps, Perhaps (1966) and More Mishaps (1968). Emergency Messages (1989) features selections from the two books along with some of Solomon's other autobiographical, critical and poetic writings. He was a frequent contributor to New Directions Annual, American Book Review, and The New Leader.
