= A House on a Hill =

- Directed by: Chuck Workman
- Written by: Chuck Workman
- Produced by: Chuck Workman
- Starring: Philip Baker Hall; Laura San Giacomo; Shirley Knight; Henry Rollins
- Distributed by: Calliope Films
- Release date: November 14, 2003 (New York City)
- Running time: 89 minutes
- Country: United States
- Language: English

A House on a Hill is a 2003 American drama film written and directed by Chuck Workman, and starring Philip Baker Hall, Laura San Giacomo, Shirley Knight and Henry Rollins.

== Plot ==
After buying a piece of land, the owner hires a filmmaker to document the construction of the home by an aging architect.

== Cast ==
- Philip Baker Hall as Harry Mayfield
- Laura San Giacomo as Gaby
- Shirley Knight as Mercedes Mayfield
- Henry Rollins as Arthur
- Rebecca Staab as Kate Banks
- James Karen as Sy
- Domenica Cameron-Scorsese as Jennifer
- Jack Conley as Richard Banks
- John J. Vogel as Lee Stans

== Reception ==
The film has a 75% rating on Rotten Tomatoes.
