= Jake Ehrlich =

American lawyer

- Born: Jacob Wilbur Ehrlich; October 15, 1900; Montgomery County, Maryland
- Died: December 24, 1971 (aged 71); San Francisco, California
- Burial place: Woodlawn Memorial Park Cemetery
- Occupation: Lawyer

Jake W. Ehrlich (October 15, 1900 – December 24, 1971) was an American lawyer and writer.

== Biography ==
Ehrlich was born near Rockville, Montgomery County, Maryland. He earned a law degree and later a doctorate at Georgetown University. He married Marjorie Mercer on June 30, 1920.

Known as "the Master", Ehrlich had a 50-year career as a defense and divorce attorney in San Francisco. He was an early example of a "celebrity lawyer", with a talent for publicity as well as legal expertise. He wrote a dozen books, on such subjects as the law, the Bible, and his own life story.

He was the model for television lawyer Sam Benedict, portrayed by Edmond O'Brien in the early 1960s, and Ehrlich was the series' technical adviser. In the 1950s, Ehrlich had coached actor Raymond Burr when Burr was preparing to play trial attorney and sleuth Perry Mason on television. Some writers contend that Ehrlich was the actual inspiration for the Perry Mason character, who first appeared in novels in 1933, when Ehrlich was a young attorney. But Mason's creator, Erle Stanley Gardner — whose own legal career bore similarities to Ehrlich's — did not make any such statement.

For much of his career, Ehrlich was lead attorney for the San Francisco Police Officer's Association. Ehrlich defended prostitutes and police officers during the 1937 Grand Jury proceedings initiated by the work of Edwin Atherton, hired by the San Francisco DA to investigate police malfeasance.

Ehrlich's slogan was "Never Plead Guilty."

His celebrity clients include actors, writers, night club entertainers, directors, musicians, sports figures, industrialists, madames, murderers, bigamists and petty crooks. Included in his client list were Alexander Pantages for statutory rape, Gene Krupa for cannabis and Billie Holiday for heroin, as well as Errol Flynn and James Mason for divorce, Howard Hughes for the movie The Outlaw, and Gertrude Morris for murdering her husband in 1952. He also defended rapist Caryl Chessman and stripper Sally Rand.

In 1957, he was lead attorney for Lawrence Ferlinghetti, proprietor of City Lights Books along with L. Speiser and Al Bendich, defending the sale of Allen Ginsberg's book Howl and Other Poems in the obscenity trial. In the 2010 feature film Howl, Ehrlich is played by actor Jon Hamm. In another connection to the world of entertainment, Ehrlich was father-in-law to famed recording star Guy Cherney.

The residence Ehrlich designed with a sliding glass roof at the top of Camino Alto Road in Marin County, in Northern California, was later owned by rock promoter Bill Graham. Ehrlich loved to tell people visiting his home that the electronic roof was actually powered by clients who were unable to pay their legal bills.

== Works ==
- Ehrlich's Blackstone
- Howl of the Censor (ISBN 0-8371-8685-4)
- Ehrlich's Criminal Law
- Criminal Evidence
- The Educated Lawyer
- What is Wrong with the Jury System
- The Lost Art of Cross Examination (ISBN 0-88029-151-6)
- Trial of The Contested Divorce Case
- The Holy Bible and The Law (ISBN 1-58477-192-5)
- A Reasonable doubt
- A Life in My Hands – autobiography
  - Philip Zimet, A Life In My Hands. By Jacob W. Ehrlich, 3 San Diego L. Rev. 139 (1966).
  - https://digital.sandiego.edu/sdlr/vol3/iss1/17/
  - https://digital.sandiego.edu/cgi/viewcontent.cgi?article=2481&context=sdlr
- A Conflict of Interest – with B. Williams
- Howl of the Censor – editor (ISBN 1-11117-504-7)
