= Precious Images =

- Directed by: Chuck Workman
- Produced by: Chuck Workman
- Edited by: Chuck Workman
- Production company: Directors Guild of America (DGA)
- Distributed by: Cineplex Odeon Films
- Release date: April 1986 (WorldFest Houston)
- Running time: 8 minutes
- Country: United States
- Language: English

Precious Images is a 1986 short film directed by Chuck Workman. It features approximately 470 half-second-long splices of movie moments through the history of American film. Some of the clips are organized by genre and set to appropriate music; musicals, for example, are accompanied by the title song from Singin' in the Rain. Films featured range chronologically from The Great Train Robbery (1903) to Rocky IV (1985), and range in subject from light comedies to dramas and horror films.

== Production ==
Precious Images was commissioned by the Directors Guild for its 50th anniversary. Workman had previously produced two documentaries, The Director and the Image (1984) and The Director and the Actor (1984), for the Guild. Editing took about three months to complete.

Precious Images features half-second-long splices from approximately 470 American films. Chuck Workman described the film's editing structure as "a sprint. You take a breath and you go."

"Of course, I had so many movies I wanted to include that the time constraint forced me to compress the film more and more. The cutting got faster and faster, but I realized that the film was still working. And I was moving things around, and it was still working. I started finding these wonderful little combinations of shots, the kind of edits that I'd been doing for years in other things, but suddenly in this film I wasn't selling anything. It was a wonderful moment for me."

== Release ==
Precious Images won the Oscar for Live Action Short Film during the 1987 ceremony, where it was featured in its entirety. In 1996, the film was reissued with new scenes from more contemporary films up to that point. It was also shown every 15 minutes within London's Museum of the Moving Image since its 1988 opening, but this very popular attraction was closed in 1999.

The film was screened out of competition at the 1986 Cannes Film Festival.

== Recognition ==
In 2009, Precious Images was selected for preservation in the United States National Film Registry by the Library of Congress as being "culturally, historically, or aesthetically significant".
