= Magician: The Astonishing Life and Work of Orson Welles =

- Theatrical release poster
- Directed by: Chuck Workman
- Produced by: Charles S. Cohen
- Cinematography: John Sharaf; Tom Hurwitz; Michael Lisnet
- Edited by: Chuck Workman
- Production companies: Cohen Welles Project; Calliope Films; Wheelhouse Creative
- Distributed by: Cohen Media Group
- Release dates: October 17, 2014 (Woodstock Film Festival); December 10, 2014
- Running time: 95 minutes
- Country: United States
- Language: English

Magician: The Astonishing Life and Work of Orson Welles is a 2014 American documentary film by Chuck Workman.

== Synopsis ==
Produced on the eve of the centenary of Orson Welles's birth, the film is a chronological review of his personal life and achievements in theatre, radio and film. It includes excerpts of nearly all of Welles's films, archival footage and audio, and interviews with colleagues, biographers, critics, friends and contemporary directors who credit his influence.

== Release ==
First presented at numerous film festivals, the film was released theatrically on December 10, 2014.

== Reception ==
The film received positive reviews with 73% on Rotten Tomatoes and 67 on Metacritic

The Observer called the film "an excellent primer on the maestro’s career".
