= Janine Pommy Vega =

American poet

- Born: February 5, 1942; Jersey City, New Jersey
- Died: December 23, 2010 (aged 68); Willow, New York
- Occupations: Writer, poet
- Notable work: Poems to Fernando; Tracking the Serpent; The Green Piano

Janine Pommy Vega (February 5, 1942 – December 23, 2010) was an American poet associated with the Beat Generation.

== Early life ==
Janine Pommy was born in Jersey City, New Jersey. Her father worked as a milkman in the mornings and a carpenter in the afternoons. At the age of sixteen, inspired by Jack Kerouac's On the Road, she went with a friend to the Cedar Tavern in Greenwich Village, where they met Gregory Corso; in 1960, after graduating as valedictorian of her high school class, she moved in with Allen Ginsberg and Peter Orlovsky.

== Career ==
She worked as a waitress and wrote Beat-inspired experimental poetry. In December 1962, she married the Peruvian painter Fernando Vega in Israel and moved with him to Paris, where she collected money for street musicians and modeled at the École des Beaux-Arts. After Vega's sudden death in Ibiza in 1965, she returned to the United States and moved to California. Her first book, Poems to Fernando, was published by City Lights in 1968 in their City Lights Pocket Poets Series, the third volume by a woman.

In the 1970s and 1980s Vega traveled widely, trekking in the Himalayas and living in Peru, Colombia, and Bolivia, including two years as a hermit on the Isla del Sol in Lake Titicaca on the Bolivian-Peruvian border, where she completed Journal of a Hermit (1974) and Morning Passage (1976). Tracking the Serpent: Journeys to Four Continents (1997) chronicles her 1980s travels to centers of ancient matriarchy.

In addition to her own books of poetry, the last of which was The Green Piano (2005), Vega was widely anthologized, including in City Lights Pocket Poets Anthology and Women of the Beat Generation. She also toured with a band called Tiamalu, performing in English and Spanish.

=== Teaching ===
Vega taught in schools in English and Spanish through arts in education programs including Teachers & Writers Collaborative, Poets in the Schools, Arts/Genesis, and New York City Ballet, and beginning in the mid-1970s in prisons through Incisions/Arts, becoming its director in 1987, and later through the Bard Prison Initiative run by Bard College. She served on the PEN Prison Writing Committee.

== Later life and death ==
From 1999, Vega lived with poet Andy Clausen. On December 23, 2010, she died at home in Willow, New York, of a heart attack.

== Awards ==
She won two Golda Awards, the second for The Green Piano, and was awarded many grants, including an annual grant from the New York State Council on the Arts for her work in prisons through Incisions/Arts.

== Works ==
- Poems to Fernando (1968)
- Journal of a Hermit (1974); repr. with Under The Sky
- Morning Passage (1976)
- Here at the Door (1978)
- The Bard Owl (1980)
- Skywriting (1988)
- Apex of The Earth's Way (1984)
- Drunk on a Glacier, Talking to Flies (1988)
- Island of the Sun (1991)
- Threading the Maze (1992)
- Red Bracelets (1993)
- Tracking the Serpent: Journeys to Four Continents (1997)
- The Road to Your House Is A Mountain Road (1995)
- The Walker (2003)
- Mad Dogs of Trieste: New & Selected Poems (2000)
- The Green Piano (2005)
- She also published in literary journals such as Earth's Daughters.
