= A Supermarket in California =

Poem by Allen Ginsberg

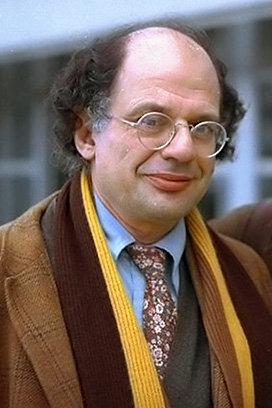
Allen Ginsberg in 1978

"A Supermarket in California" is a poem by American poet Allen Ginsberg first published in Howl and Other Poems in 1956. In the poem, the narrator visits a supermarket in California and imagines finding Federico García Lorca and Walt Whitman shopping. Whitman, who is also discussed in "Howl", is a character common in Ginsberg's poems, and is often referred to as Ginsberg's poetic model. "A Supermarket in California", written in Berkeley about a market at University Avenue and Grove Street (now Martin Luther King, Jr. Way) in that city and published in 1956, was intended to be a tribute to Whitman in the centennial year of the first edition of Leaves of Grass.

For its critique of mainstream American culture, the poem is considered to be one of the major works of the Beat Generation, which included other authors of the era such as Jack Kerouac, William Seward Burroughs, and Lawrence Ferlinghetti. Ginsberg achieved critical success in 1956 with the publication of Howl and Other Poems, with "Howl" being the most popular of the works in the collection. Like "Howl", "A Supermarket in California" was a critique of postwar America, yet in the poem the narrator focuses more on consumerist aspects of society by contrasting his generation with Whitman's.

== The poem ==
"A Supermarket in California" is a prose poem with an irregular format that does not adhere to traditional poetic form including stanza and rhyme scheme. The format is a resemblance of the long-winded aspect of speech. The long-line style is attributed to Whitman and "as with Whitman, by the time we have traversed the stretch of one of these long lines, we have experienced a rapid set of transformations." This is shown within the poem's location, the metaphorical supermarket and its symbolism of Ginsberg's America. The form of Ginsberg's poem comes from "his knowledge of Walt Whitman's long-line style" which was an experiment for Ginsberg before he adapted it to all his works later on.

In the opening line, the poet addresses Whitman, or Whitman's spirit as he finds himself "shopping for images", which Douglas Allen Burns suggests puts a capitalist spin on the situation described in the poem. The narrator sees families of consumers shopping in the market alongside the figures of deceased poets Lorca and Whitman, both of whom were homosexual poets like Ginsberg himself. The poet notes the sexuality of Whitman as he describes the character as a "childless, lonely old grubber, poking among the meats in the refrigerator and eyeing the grocery boys". Bill Morgan also writes that Ginsberg always saw Whitman as a kindred spirit in regards to their similar sexualities, seeing "a self-imposed repression of his innate queerness," which is evident in the poem through its idolization of Whitman. Betsy Erkkila, in Whitman the Political Poet, suggests that Ginsberg brings Whitman into the poem to show the difference between the America described in the works of Whitman and that which exists in 1955 when "A Supermarket in California" is written. In her opinion, "America" is not described as being a physical place but one that exists in the imagination of the poet and can "live and die only with him".

Ginsberg introduces the character of Lorca in line 7, asking "..and you, Garcia Lorca, what were you doing down by the watermelons?". Lorca was a famous Spanish poet and playwright who had died in 1936, yet his spirit appears in the supermarket in 1955 when the poem is written. Lorca's works were often classified as surrealistic and were considered to have homoerotic tones.

In the final lines of the poem, Ginsberg turns once again to the image of Whitman, asking:

Ah, dear father, greybeard, lonely old courage-
teacher, what America did you have when Charon quit
poling his ferry and you got out on a smoking bank
and stood watching the boat disappear in the black
waters of Lethe?

In Greek mythology, Charon was the ferryman who carried the dead into the underworld, across the river Styx. The River Lethe was a different river in the underworld, which caused those who drank its waters to experience complete forgetfulness. The shades of the dead were required to drink the waters of the Lethe in order to forget their earthly life.

== Critical analysis ==
In Story Line, Ian Marshall suggests that the poem is written to show the differences in American life depicted by Whitman and that which faces Ginsberg in the 1950s: "It's the distance of a century—with Civil War and the 'triumph' of the Industrial Revolution and Darwinism and Freud and two world wars, mustard gas, and the hydrogen bomb, the advent of the technological era, Vietnam, and IBM." To Marshall, the poem is meant to show the change from 19th century optimism to the "ennui" portrayed in Ginsberg's poems. Marshall's notion about Ginsberg's portrayal of the evolution of society is shown within the lines, "I heard you asking questions of each: Who killed the pork chops? What price bananas?" In Whitman's day, he would have known the answer to those questions because back then, one would go to the farmer directly to get the products unlike the modern American supermarkets where one does not know where the products come from.

Describing the relationship between Ginsberg and Whitman in "Howl" and "A Supermarket in California", Byrne R.S. Fone states that sexuality, specifically homosexuality, plays a key role in the poem's presentation of reality: "Not since Whitman had an American homosexual poet dared to intimate, let alone announce, that joy not pain was the result of homosexual rape and to suggest that sex not philosophy might be the most powerful weapon against oppression." Burns adds that the use of Lorca and Whitman is intended to show the counter-cultural aspects of Ginsberg's art. The poetry of Lorca and Whitman, to Burns, express a value system that contradicts everything the modern supermarket represents. Whereas "love" is what America represents in the works of previous poets, the America of Ginsberg's poetry is best presented through poetical references to "supermarkets and automobiles".

Critic Nick Selby, in an essay titled "'Queer Shoulders to the Wheel': Whitman, Ginsberg, and a Bisexual Poetics", suggests that "A Supermarket in California" presents sexuality as one of several opposing forces. Selby states that the binary opposites of heterosexuality and homosexuality function in the poem in the same manner as other opposites that make up the major themes of the work: capitalist vs. communist, American vs. un-American, and mainstream culture vs. counterculture. He adds that Ginsberg ironically uses the supermarket setting to show how mainstream culture forces conformity upon consumers, to highlight the "radical homosexuality" of Whitman and Ginsberg, and to put the poets' sexual non-conformity into a broader social context.
