= Earth's Daughters =

Feminist literary and arts journal

Earth’s Daughters is a feminist literary and arts journal, published continuously since 1971. The journal is "based in and committed to" Buffalo, New York. It is believed to be the oldest extant feminist arts periodical, and generations of women have worked on this magazine.

== Format and archive ==
The magazine is a print format, with 1980 reviews reporting that each issue features different formats, such as 12 loose pages in an envelope. The University of Buffalo has archives from this magazine from 1969 to 2015, and UC San Diego has extensive archives as well.

== Contributions, staff, and readings ==
The journal has featured artists such as Denise Levertov, Lyn Lifshin, Marge Piercy, Diane diPrima, Janine Pommy Vega, Susan Fantl Spivack, Jessica Claire Haney's “Out of Scale”, and Jessica Jordan Nudel.

The Just Buffalo Literary Center held a 50th anniversary reading on December 1, 2021, featuring readings by the magazine’s poet-editors Kastle Brill, Jennifer Campbell, Joyce Kessel, Janna Willoughby-Lohr, and ryki zuckerman.

Joyce Kessel is a long-term member of this staff. Judith Kerman is a founding member.
