= Ronald K. L. Collins =

American lawyer

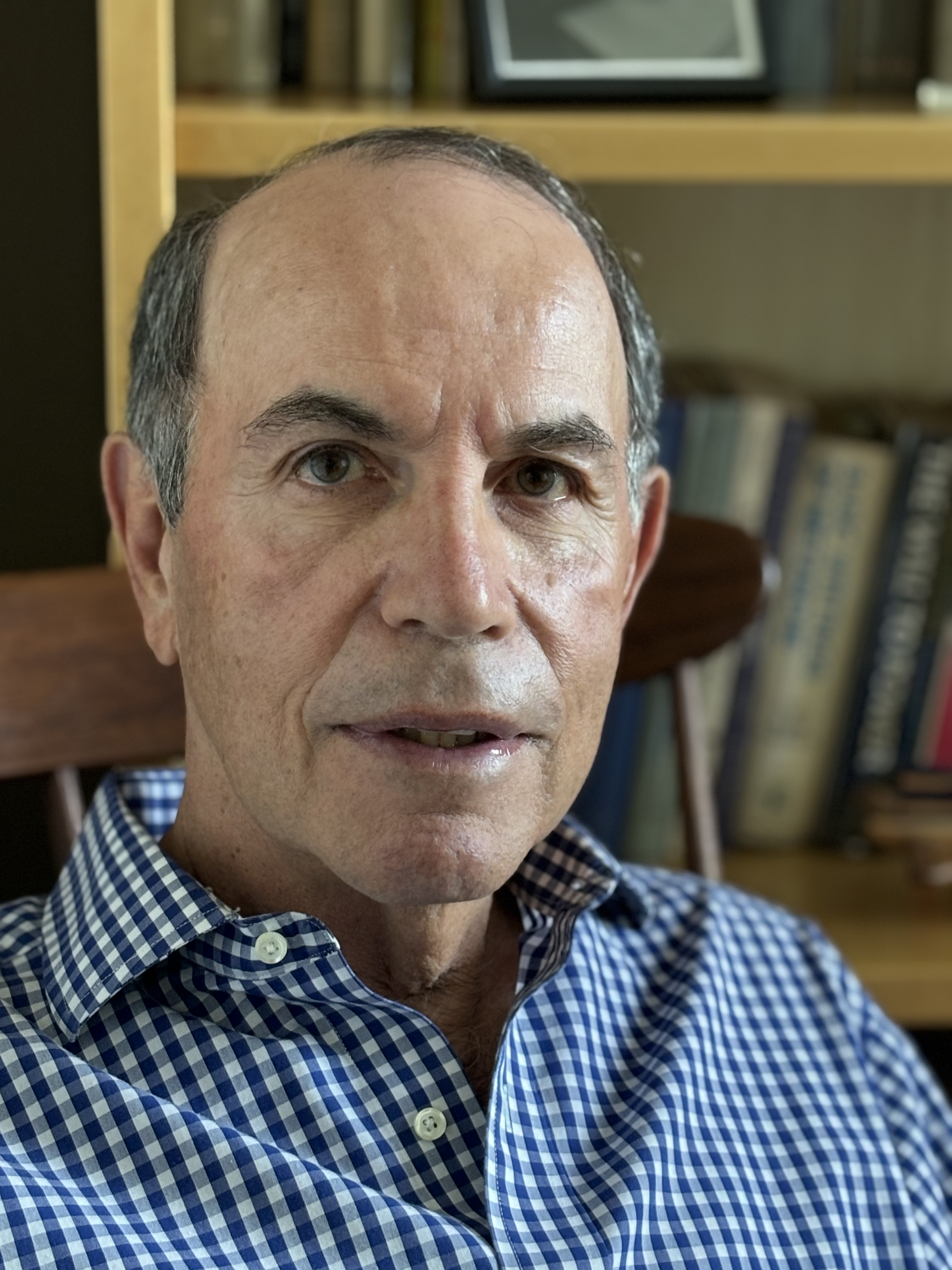
- Born: Ronald Kenneth Leo Collins; July 31, 1949 (age 77); Santa Monica, California
- Education: University of California at Santa Barbara; Loyola Law School
- Writing career
- Literary movement: History Book Festival / editor, ATTENTION

Ronald Kenneth Leo Collins (born July 31, 1949) is the co-founder and co-director (emeritus) of the History Book Festival and co-founder and co-chair of the First Amendment Salons. For 500 posts, he was the editor of the weekly online blog First Amendment News. Currently, he is the editor of Attention (an online journal on the life and legacy of Simone Weil). He is also the Lewes Public Library's Distinguished Lecturer.

== Biography ==
Collins was born in Santa Monica, California in 1949. graduated from the University of California at Santa Barbara with a B.A. in political philosophy. He received a J.D. degree from Loyola Law School in Los Angeles (served on Loyola Law Review). After graduating from law school, he worked as a law clerk to Hans A. Linde on the Oregon Supreme Court and was a judicial fellow under Chief Justice Warren Burger. He is the recipient of Supreme Court Fellows Alumni Association's Administration of Justice Award for legal scholarship (February 2011).

After teaching at Syracuse Law School and George Washington Law School, he was a scholar at the Newseum's First Amendment Center in Washington, D.C. for six years. Thereafter, he was the Harold S. Shefelman Scholar at the University of Washington School of Law.

In 2011 and thereafter, Collins was the book editor for SCOTUSblog; as of 2026, he is a columnist for the blog. He is the co-founder of the Washington Independent Review of Books. He has written, edited and co-authored (with David Skover) several books related to law, freedom of speech, and constitutional justice in the United States. His other works include A Declaration of Duties Toward Humankind: A Critical Companion to Simone Weil's The Need for Roots (co-edited with Eric Springsted) and Tragedy on Trial: The Story of the Infamous Emmett Till Murder Trial.

Collins was selected as a Norman Mailer Fellow in fiction writing with a residence in Provincetown (Winter 2010). He is currently on the advisory council of the Foundation for Individual Rights and Expression.

He has written scholarly articles for Harvard Law Review, Stanford Law Review, University of Chicago Law Review, Supreme Court Review, and Michigan Law Review, among other publications. His popular press articles or reviews have appeared in The New York Times, The Washington Post, Los Angeles Times, Chicago Tribune, The Baltimore Sun, The Forward, and The Nation.

In 2025, he launched (with Paul Sparrow) The Singer-Songwriter Series.

== Bibliography ==
- Forbidden Freedom: A Novel (forthcoming 2027)
- Before and Beyond Brown v. Board: The Delaware Story of Louis Redding, Jack Greenberg, and Collins Seitz and How They Shaped the Future of Racial Justice in America (forthcoming 2027)
- Common Sense in the Age of Trump: A Guide to Keeping Our Republic (Aug. 2026) (with Russ Huxtable, Amy Marasco & Paul Sparrow)
- Tragedy on Trial: The Story of the Infamous Emmett Till Murder Trial (2024)
- A Declaration of Duties Toward Humankind: A Critical Companion to Simone Weil's The Need for Roots (editor, 2024)
- First Things First: A Modern Coursebook on Free Speech Fundamentals (2019)
- The People v. Ferlinghetti: The Fight to Publish Allen Ginsberg's Howl (2019)
- Robotica: Speech Rights and Artificial Intelligence (2018)
- The Judge: 26 Machiavellian Lessons (2019)
- On Dissent: Its Meaning in America (2015)
- When Money Speaks: The McCutcheon Decision, Campaign Finance Laws, and the First Amendment (2014)
- Mania: The Story of the Outraged and Outrageous Lives That Launched a Cultural Revolution (2013)
- Nuanced Absolutism: Floyd Abrams and the First Amendment (2013)
- The Trials of Lenny Bruce (2012)
- The Fundamental Holmes: A Free Speech Chronicle and Reader (editor, 2010)
- The Death of Discourse (1996, 2006 & 2022)
- The Death of Contract: 2nd Edition (editor, 1995)
- Constitutional Government in America (editor, 1980)

== Website ==
- https://commonsense-usa.com
