= Mind Breaths =

Book by Allen Ginsberg

First edition

Mind Breaths is a book of poetry by Allen Ginsberg published by City Lights Publishers. It contains poems written by Ginsberg between 1972 and 1977.

Some of these poems include:

- "Ayers Rock Uluru Song" (about Uluru, or Ayers Rock)
- "Under the World There's a Lot of Ass"
- "On Neruda's Death" (about Pablo Neruda)
- "Sweet Boy, Gimme Yr Ass"
- "Sad Dust Glories"
- "Ego Confessions"
- "Jaweh and Allah Battle"
- "Mugging"
- "We Rise on Sunbeams and Fall in the Night" (about the death of William Carlos Williams)
- "Hadda Be Playing on the Jukebox"
- "Rolling Thunder Stones"
- "Don't Grow Old"
- "Contest of Bards"
