= Shig Murao =

Japanese-American bookseller

Shigeyoshi "Shig" Murao
- 村尾重芳
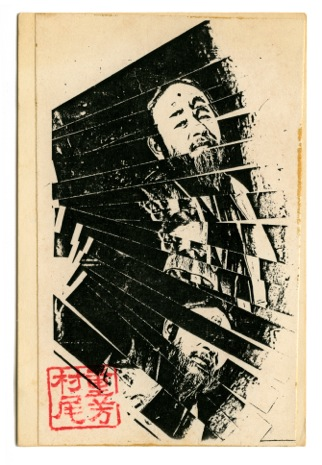
- Self portrait photo-collage of Shig Murao
- Born: December 8, 1926; Seattle, Washington
- Died: October 18, 1999 (aged 72); Cupertino, California
- Occupation: Manager of City Lights Bookstore
- Conviction: Not guilty
- Criminal charges: Sale of obscene material

Shigeyoshi "Shig" Murao (村尾 重芳, Murao Shigeyoshi, b. December 8, 1926 – d. October 18, 1999) was a Japanese-American bookseller who is mainly remembered as the City Lights manager and clerk who was arrested on June 3, 1957, for selling Allen Ginsberg's Howl to an undercover San Francisco police officer. In the trial that followed, Murao was charged with selling the book and Lawrence Ferlinghetti with publishing it. Murao and Ferlinghetti were exonerated, and Howl was judged protected under the First Amendment, a decision that paved the way for the publication of Henry Miller, D. H. Lawrence, William Burroughs, and many other writers who offended the sensibilities of the majority.

== Family background ==
Murao's father, Shigekata Murao, was born in 1888 (d. early 1970s) in Chiran, Kagoshima (now part of the city of Minamikyūshū) to a former samurai family. He attended business school, and immigrated to Vancouver in 1910 against his family's wishes, working menial jobs to earn money. He eventually moved to Seattle, where he opened a successful butcher shop named Annex Meats. In 1920, he returned to Chiran, and entered into an arranged marriage with Ume Sata (d. 1984), who was an orphan "from a prominent samurai family".

The Muraos then returned to Seattle, where Ume gave birth to several children - excluding Murao and his twin sister: Mitsuko (b. 1923, worked for the United States Postal Service), twins Shigesato and Masako (b. 1924, Masako died in infancy, Shigesato became a teacher in Chicago), Mutsuko (b. 1928, retired former editor at Harper and Row).

== Early life ==
Murao and his twin sister Shizuko were born on December 8, 1926, in Seattle, Washington. In 1942, following the attack on Pearl Harbor and signing of Executive Order 9066, Murao and his family were interned at the Minidoka War Relocation Center, Idaho. He joined the Military Intelligence Service in 1944, and worked in post-war Japan as an interpreter.

== Managing City Lights ==
Ferlinghetti and Peter Martin, the co-founder of City Lights, hired Murao as a clerk soon after the store opened in June 1953. Murao worked without pay for the first few weeks, but eventually became the manager of the bookstore, and his genial personality set the tone for the bookstore. He continued in that position until 1976, building friendships with many of the Beat icons, including Ginsberg, who became a close friend and would stay at Murao's Grant Avenue apartment when visiting the Bay Area. Murao suffered the first in a series of strokes in the fall of 1975. When he returned to work Ferlinghetti wanted to bring in new management. Murao refused this arrangement and walked away from the store that had been his life. Murao and Ferlinghetti never reconciled.

== Post-City Lights ==
Murao was not a poet, but he played a key role in the San Francisco Beat scene and had a large circle of friends, including Ginsberg, Michael McClure, Gary Snyder, Richard Brautigan, and many other literary and Beat-era figures. After his separation from City Lights, he held court in the Caffe Trieste and published a photocopied zine called Shig's Review.

The first three issues of Shig's Review, published in 1960 and 1969, were printed and bound. Beginning in 1983, Murao revived the review as a photocopied zine. He would take a collection of poems, photos, poetry reading fliers, or his own collages to a copy shop and make twenty or thirty copies. He would then staple them in the corner, put his hanko on the cover in red ink, and walk down to the Caffe Trieste, where he would give them to his friends. Murao published about eighty issues of the quirky review before his death.

== Later life and death ==
In 1984, Murao's mother Ume died, and his nephew by Shigesato, John Murao, wanted to take her ashes to be buried in Japan. Murao decided to join him on the trip. To help raise funds for the trip, he sold many of the first editions that he had accumulated working at City Lights. They visited several places, including a Nagasaki monastery where his uncle Shigeo was a monk, before eventually reaching Chiran and visiting the Murao family grave to bury Ume. The Murao family had long moved out of the area, but Murao was able to visit some of the most important places to his ascendants, including the Murao and Sata family homes.

In the 1990s, Murao moved to an assisted living home in Palo Alto, California, and briefly recreated his life in North Beach, visiting cafes and bookstores in an electric wheelchair. After an accident in the wheelchair, he moved to a convalescent hospital in Cupertino, California; he died there in 1999.
