= Pete Winslow =

American surrealist poet

Pete Winslow (1934–1972) was an American surrealist poet associated with the Beat Generation.

He was born on 19 October 1934 in Washington state. He died in September 1972 of complications following surgery and was survived by his wife Jane Winslow and son, Peter Winslow, who died in a car accident in 1993.

He graduated from the University of Washington in journalism in 1956.

His last book, Daisy in the Memory of a Shark, was published posthumously by City Lights Books in 1973.

== Bibliography ==
- What Ever Happened to Pete Winslow? (Tolle House, 1960)
- The Rapist and Other Poems (Golden Mountain Press, 1962)
- Monster Cookies, Poems 1962-1966 - Illustrated by Ken Brandon (Self-published, 1967)
- Mummy Tapes, Poems 1969-70 (Medusa Press, 1971)
- Daisy in the Memory of a Shark - Pocket Poets Number 31 - with an introduction by Stephen Schwartz (City Lights Books, 1973)
