= David Skover =

American legal academic

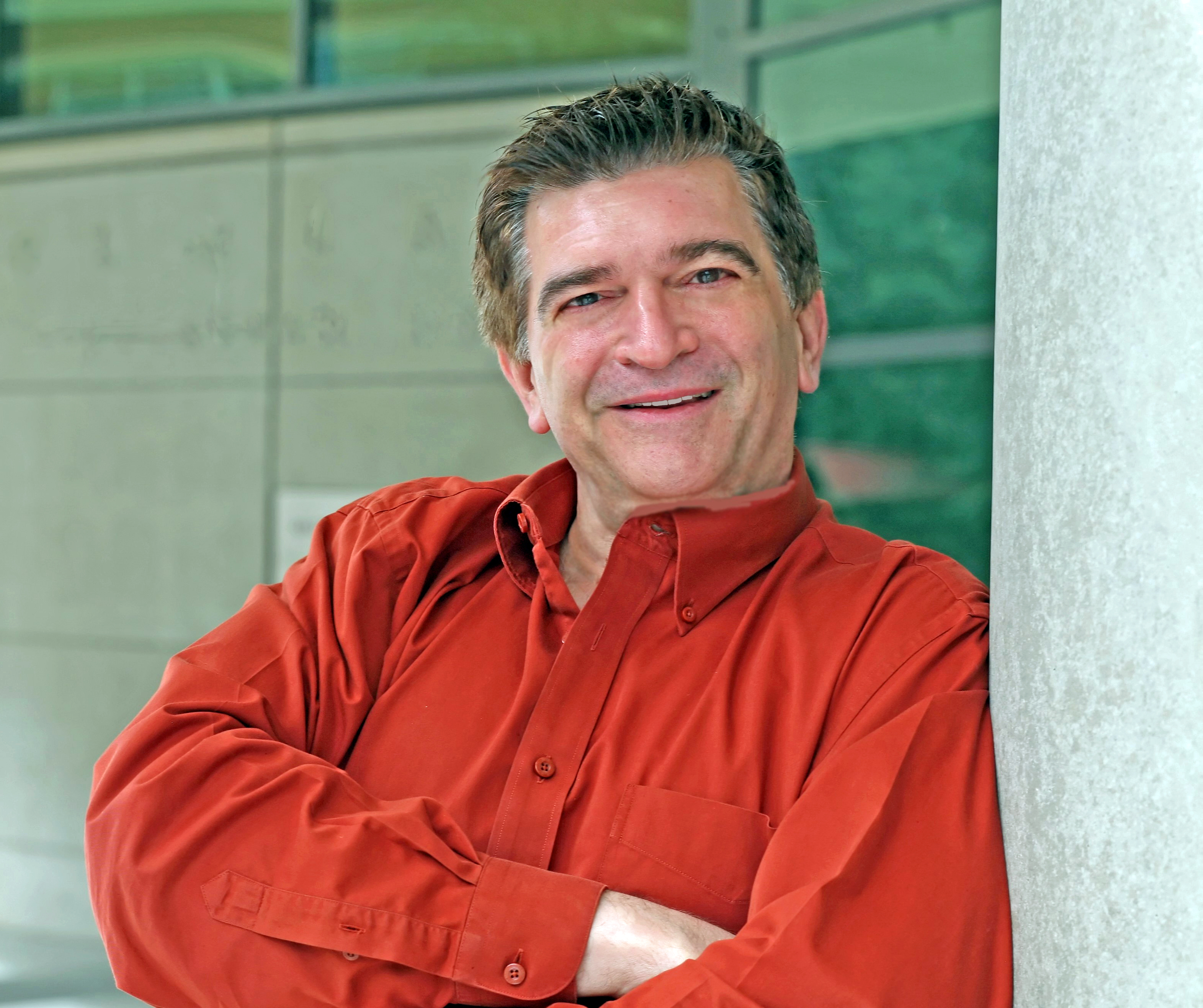

Academic background
- Education: Princeton University (BA); Yale University (JD)

Academic work
- Discipline: Constitutional Law
- Institutions: Seattle University

David Michael Skover is the former Fredric C. Tausend Professor of Law at the Seattle University School of Law. He taught, wrote, and lectured in the fields of federal constitutional law, federal courts, free speech & the internet, and mass communications theory. He is also a regionally acclaimed opera and musical theater singer.

== Career ==
David graduated from the Woodrow Wilson School of International and Domestic Affairs at Princeton University. He received his Juris Doctor degree from Yale Law School, where he was an editor of the Yale Law Journal. Thereafter, he served as a law clerk for federal judge Jon O. Newman of the U.S. Court of Appeals for the Second Circuit.

David began his teaching career in 1982 at the University of Puget Sound Law School in Tacoma, Washington. Subsequently, he was a visiting professor at the University of Indiana Law School in Bloomington. He returned to the Northwest and taught at the Seattle University School of Law, where he had a named professorship position. David became an Emeritus Professor in 2022, after his fortieth year in teaching. On September 10, 2022, his former students (known as "The Skoverites") gathered for a retirement celebration at the Columbia Tower Club in downtown Seattle.

David appears frequently on network and cable television and social media, and has been quoted in the national popular press (e.g. NYT, WSJ, CSM, etc.) on a spectrum of issues ranging from constitutional law to pop media culture and theory. He is also a regionally acclaimed singer in opera, musical theater, and cabaret performances.

== Selected book publications ==
David has coauthored the following books with Ronald Collins:

- The Death of Discourse (Westview/HarperCollins, 1996; Carolina Academic Press, 2nd ed. 2005, 3rd ed. 2022)
- The Trials of Lenny Bruce (Sourcebooks, 2002)
- Mania: The Story of the Outraged and Outrageous Lives that Launched a Cultural Revolution (Top Five Books, 2013)
- On Dissent: Its Meaning in America (Cambridge University Press, 2013)
- The Judge: 26 Machiavellian Lessons (Oxford University Press, 2017)
- Robotica: Speech Rights and Artificial Intelligence (Cambridge University Press, 2018)
- The People v. Ferlinghetti: The Fight to Publish Allen Ginsberg's HOWL (Rowman & Littlefield, 2019)

He has also co-authored the following book with Pierre Schlag:

- Tactics of Legal Reasoning (Carolina Academic Press, 1986)

== Selected scholarly publications ==
David has published more than thirty scholarly articles in various journals, including the Harvard Law Review, Yale Law Journal, Stanford Law Review, Michigan Law Review, Texas Law Review, The Nation magazine, the Encyclopedia of the Supreme Court of the United States (Macmillan, 2008), and the Encyclopedia of the American Constitution (Macmillan, 1991). Among the articles coauthored with Ronald Collins are the following:

- "The Future of Liberal Legal Scholarship," 87 Michigan Law Review 189 (1988)
- "The First Amendment in an Age of Paratroopers," 68 Texas Law Review 1087 (1990)(symposium issue on this article)
- "Paratexts," 44 Stanford Law Review 509 (1992)
- "Commerce and Communication," 71 Texas Law Review 697 (1993)(symposium issue on this article)
- "The Pornographic State," 107 Harvard Law Review 1374 (1994)
- "New 'Truths' and the Old First Amendment," 64 University of Cincinnati Law Review 1315 (1996)(symposium issue on this article)
- "Foreword: The Landmark Free-Speech Case That Wasn't: The Nike v. Kasky Story," 54 Case Western Reserve Law Review 965-1047 (2004) (the lead piece in a symposium issue on the Nike controversy)
- "Curious Concurrence: Justice Brandeis's Vote in Whitney v. California," 2005 Supreme Court Review 333
- "Paratexts as Praxis," 37 Neohelicon 33 (2010)
- "Foreword: Guardians of Knowledge in the Modern State," 87 Washington Law Review 1 (2012) (the lead piece in a symposium issue on Robert Post, Democracy, Expertise, Academic Freedom (Yale University Press, 2012)
