= Denise Levertov =

American poet (1923–1997)

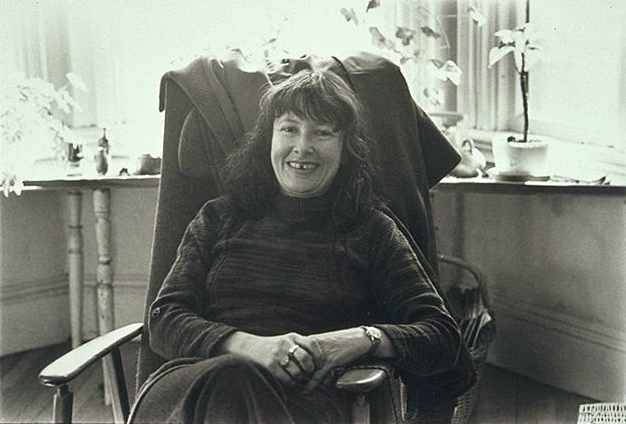
- Born: Priscilla Denise Levertoff; 24 October 1923; Ilford, Essex, England
- Died: 20 December 1997 (aged 74); Seattle, Washington, US
- Occupation: Poet
- Writing career
- Period: 1946 to 1997
- Notable awards: Shelley Memorial Award (1984); Robert Frost Medal (1990)

Priscilla Denise Levertov (24 October 1923 – 20 December 1997) was a British-born naturalised American poet. She was heavily influenced by the Black Mountain poets and by the political context of the Vietnam War, which she explored in her poetry book The Freeing of the Dust. She was a recipient of the Lannan Literary Award for Poetry.

== Early life and influences ==
Levertov was born and grew up in Ilford, Essex, England. Her mother, Beatrice Adelaide (née Spooner-Jones) Levertoff, came from a small mining village in North Wales. Her father, Paul Levertoff, had been a teacher at Leipzig University and as a Russian Hasidic Jew was held under house arrest during the First World War as an "enemy alien" by virtue of his ethnicity. He emigrated to the UK and became an Anglican priest after converting to Christianity. In the mistaken belief that he would want to preach in a Jewish neighbourhood, he was housed in Ilford, within reach of a parish in Shoreditch, in East London. His daughter wrote: "My father's Hasidic ancestry, his being steeped in Jewish and Christian scholarship and mysticism, his fervour and eloquence as a preacher, were factors built into my cells." Levertov, who was educated at home, showed an enthusiasm for writing from an early age and studied ballet, art, piano and French as well as standard subjects. She wrote about the strangeness she felt growing up part Jewish, German, Welsh and English, but not fully belonging to any of these identities. She notes that it lent her a sense of being special rather than excluded: "[I knew] before I was ten that I was an artist-person and I had a destiny." She noted: "Humanitarian politics came early into my life: seeing my father on a soapbox protesting Mussolini's invasion of Abyssinia; my father and sister both on soap-boxes protesting Britain's lack of support for Spain; my mother canvasing long before those events for the League of Nations Union; and all three of them working on behalf of the German and Austrian refugees from 1933 onwards… I used to sell the Daily Worker house-to-house in the working class streets of Ilford Lane". Her elder sister, Olga, was secretary of the militant anti-fascist Yellow Star Movement.

When Levertov was five years old she declared she would be a writer. At the age of 12, she sent some of her poems to T. S. Eliot, who replied with a two-page letter of encouragement. In 1940, when she was 17, Levertov published her first poem. During the Blitz, Levertov served in London as a civilian nurse. Her first book, The Double Image, was published six years later. In 1947, she met and married American writer Mitchell Goodman and moved with him to the United States the following year. Although Levertov and Goodman would eventually divorce in 1975, they did have one son together, Nikolai, in 1949. They lived mainly in New York City, summering in Maine. In 1955, she became a naturalised American citizen.

Levertov's first two books comprised poems written in traditional forms and language, but as she accepted the US as her new home and became more and more fascinated with the American idiom, she began to come under the influence of the Black Mountain poets and most importantly William Carlos Williams. Her first American book of poetry, Here and Now, shows the beginnings of this transition and transformation. Her poem "With Eyes at the Back of Our Heads" established her reputation.

== Later life and work ==
During the 1960s and '70s, Levertov became much more politically active in her life and work. As poetry editor for The Nation, she was able to support and publish the work of feminist and other leftist activist poets. The Vietnam War was an especially important focus of her poetry, which often tried to weave together the personal and political, as in her poem "The Sorrow Dance", which speaks of her sister's death. Also in response to the Vietnam War, Levertov joined the War Resisters League, and in 1968 signed the "Writers and Editors War Tax Protest" pledge, vowing to refuse tax payments in protest against the war. Levertov was a founding member of the anti-war collective RESIST along with Noam Chomsky, Mitchell Goodman, William Sloane Coffin, and Dwight Macdonald.

Much of the latter part of Levertov's life was spent in education. After moving to Massachusetts, Levertov taught at Brandeis University, MIT, Tufts University, and the University of Massachusetts Boston. She also lived part-time in Palo Alto and taught at Stanford University, as professor of English (professor emeritus). There she befriended Robert McAfee Brown, a professor of religion at Stanford and pastor. Franciscan Murray Bodo also became a spiritual advisor to her. In 1984 she uncovered notebooks of her mother and father, resolving some personal and religious conflict. In 1989, she moved from Somerville, Massachusetts, to Seattle, Washington, and lived near Seward Park on Lake Washington, with a view of her beloved Mount Rainier. On the West Coast, she had a part-time teaching stint at the University of Washington and for 11 years (1982–1993) held a full professorship at Stanford University, where she taught in the Stegner Fellowship program. In 1984, she received a Litt. D. from Bates College. After retiring from teaching, she travelled for a year, doing poetry readings in the US and Britain. In 1990, she joined the Catholic Church at St. Edward’s Parish, Seattle; she became involved in protests of the US attack on Iraq. She retired from teaching at Stanford.

In 1994, Levertov was diagnosed with lymphoma, and also suffered pneumonia and acute laryngitis. Despite this she continued to lecture and participate at national conferences, many on spirituality and poetry. In February 1997, she experienced the death of Mitch Goodman. In December 1997, Levertov died at the age of 74 from complications due to lymphoma. She was buried at Lake View Cemetery in Seattle, Washington. Her papers are held at Stanford University. The first full biography appeared in October 2012 by Dana Greene: Denise Levertov: A Poet's Life (Chicago: University of Illinois, 2012). Donna Krolik Hollenberg's more substantial biography, A Poet's Revolution: The Life of Denise Levertov, was published by the University of California Press in April 2013.

== Political poetry ==
Both politics and war are major themes in Levertov's poetry. Levertov was published in the Black Mountain Review during the 1950s, but denied any formal relations with the group. She began to develop her own lyrical style of poetry through those influences. She felt it was part of a poet's calling to point out the injustice of the Vietnam War, and she also actively participated in rallies, reading poetry at some. Some of her war poetry was published in her 1971 book To Stay Alive, a collection of anti-Vietnam War letters, newscasts, diary entries, and conversations. Complementary themes in the book involve the tension of the individual vs. the group (or government) and the development of personal voice in mass culture. In her poetry, she promotes community and group change through the imagination of the individual and emphasizes the power of individuals as advocates of change. She also links personal experience to justice and social reform.

Suffering is another major theme in Levertov's war poetry. The poems "Poetry, Prophecy, Survival", "Paradox and Equilibrium", and "Poetry and Peace: Some Broader Dimensions" revolve around war, injustice, and prejudice. In her volume Life at War, Levertov uses imagery to express the disturbing violence of the Vietnam War. Throughout these poems, she addresses violence and savagery, yet tries to bring grace into the equation, mixing the beauty of language and the ugliness of the horrors of war. The themes of her poems, especially "Staying Alive", focus on both the cost of war and the suffering of the Vietnamese. In her prose work, The Poet in the World, she writes that violence is an outlet. Levertov's first successful Vietnam poetry was her book The Freeing of the Dust. Some of the themes of this book of poems are the experience of the North Vietnamese, and distrust of people. She attacks the United States pilots in her poems for dropping bombs. Overall, her war poems incorporate suffering to show that violence has become an everyday occurrence. After years of writing such poetry, Levertov eventually came to the conclusion that beauty and poetry and politics can't go together. This opened the door wide for her religious-themed poetry in the later part of her life.

== Religious influences ==
From a very young age Levertov was influenced by her religion, and when she began writing it was a major theme in her poetry. Through her father she was exposed to both Judaism and Christianity. Levertov always believed that her culture and her family roots had inherent value to herself and her writing. Furthermore, she believed that she and her sister had a destiny pertaining to this. When Levertov moved to the United States, she fell under the influence of the Black Mountain Poets, especially the mysticism of Charles Olson. She drew on the experimentation of Ezra Pound and the style of William Carlos Williams, but was also exposed to the Transcendentalism of Thoreau and Emerson. Although all these factors shaped her poetry, her conversion to Christianity in 1984 was the main influence on her religious writing. After her move to Seattle, she became a Catholic on November 18, 1990 at St Edward's Parish. In 1997, she brought together 38 poems from seven of her earlier volumes in The Stream & the Sapphire, a collection intended, as Levertov explains in the foreword to the collection, to "trace my slow movement from agnosticism to Christian faith, a movement incorporating much doubt and questioning as well as affirmation." She corresponded with literary critic and Catholic sister M. Bernetta Quinn, who also reviewed her work.

=== Religious themes ===
Denise Levertov wrote many poems with religious themes throughout her career. These poems range from religious imagery to implied metaphors of religion. One particular theme was developed progressively throughout her poetry. This was the pilgrimage/spiritual journey of Levertov towards the deep spiritual understanding and truth in her last poems.

One of her earlier poems is "A Tree Telling of Orpheus" from her book Relearning the Alphabet. This poem uses the metaphor of a tree, which changes and grows when it hears the music of Orpheus. This is a metaphor of spiritual growth. The growth of the tree is like the growth of faith, and as the tree goes through life we also go through life on a spiritual journey. Much of Levertov's religious poetry was concerned with respect for nature and life. Also among her themes were nothingness and absence.

In her earlier poems something is always lacking, searching, and empty. In "Work that Enfaiths" Levertov begins to confront this "ample doubt" and her lack of "burning surety" in her faith. The religious aspect of this is the doubt vs. light debate. Levertov cannot find a balance between faith and darkness. She goes back and forth between the glory of God and nature, but doubt constantly plagues her.

In her earlier religious poems Levertov searches for meaning in life. She explores God as he relates to nothing(ness) and everything. In her later poetry, a shift can be seen. A Door in the Hive and Evening Train are full of poems using images of cliffs, edges, and borders to push for change in life. Once again, Levertov packs her poetry with metaphors. She explores the idea that there can be peace in death. She also begins to suggest that nothing is a part of God. "Nothingness" and darkness are no longer just reasons to doubt and agonise over. "St. Thomas Didymus" and "Mass" show this growth, as they are poems that lack her former nagging wonder and worry.

In Evening Train, Levertov's poetry is highly religious. She writes about experiencing God. These poems are breakthrough poems for her. She writes about a mountain, which becomes a metaphor for life and God. When clouds cover a mountain, it is still huge and massive and in existence. God is the same, she says. Even when He is clouded, we know He is there. Her poems tend to shift away from constantly questioning religion to accepting it simply. In "The Tide", the final section of Evening Train, Levertov writes about accepting faith and realizing that not knowing answers is tolerable. This acceptance of the paradoxes of faith marks the end of her "spiritual journey".

Levertov's heavy religious writing began at her conversion to Christianity in 1984. She wrote a great deal of metaphysical poetry to express her religious views, and began to use Christianity to link culture and community together. In her poem "Mass" she writes about how the Creator is defined by His creation. She writes a lot about nature and individuals. In the works of her last phase, Levertov sees Christianity as a bridge between individuals and society, and explores how a hostile social environment can be changed by Christian values.

== Legacy ==
Levertov wrote and published 24 books of poetry, as well as criticism and translations. She also edited several anthologies. Among her many awards and honours, she received the Shelley Memorial Award, the Robert Frost Medal, the Lenore Marshall Prize, the Lannan Award, a Catherine Luck Memorial Grant, a grant from the National Institute of Arts and Letters, and a Guggenheim Fellowship.

Levertov's "What Were They Like?" is currently included in the Pearson Edexcel GCSE (9–1) English Literature poetry anthology, and the Conflict cluster of the OCR GCSE (9-1) English Literature poetry anthology, Towards a World Unknown (2020).

== Works ==
=== Primary works ===
The Double Image (London: The Cresset Press, 1946)
Here and Now (San Francisco, Calif.: City Lights Pocket Book Shop, The Pocket Poets Series: Number Six, 1956)
Overland to the Islands (Highlands, N.C.: Jonathan Williams, Publisher, 1958)
With Eyes at the Back of Our Heads (New York: New Directions Publishing, 1959)
The Jacob's Ladder (New York: New Directions Publishing, 1961)
O Taste and See: New Poems (New York: New Directions Publishing, 1964)
The Sorrow Dance (New York: New Directions Publishing, 1967)
Relearning the Alphabet (New York: New Directions Publishing, 1970)
To Stay Alive (New York: New Directions Publishing, 1971). ISBN 0811200876
Footprints (New York: New Directions Publishing, 1972). ISBN 0811204553
The Freeing of the Dust (New York: New Directions Publishing, 1975). ISBN 978-0811205818
Life in the Forest (New York: New Directions Publishing, 1978). ISBN 978-0811206921
Collected Earlier Poems 1940–1960 (New York: New Directions Publishing, 1979). ISBN 978-0811207171
Pig Dreams: Scenes from the Life of Sylvia (Woodstock, Vt.: The Countryman Press, 1981), Pastels by Liebe Coolidge. ISBN 978-0914378822
Candles in Babylon (New York: New Directions Publishing, 1982). ISBN 978-0811208307
Poems 1960–1967 (New York: New Directions Publishing, 1983). ISBN 0-8112-0859-1
Oblique Prayers: New Poems (New York: New Directions Publishing, 1984). ISBN 0-8112-0909-1
Poems 1968–1972 (New York: New Directions Publishing, 1987). ISBN 978-0811210041
Breathing the Water (New York: New Directions Publishing, 1987). ISBN 978-0-8112-1027-0
A Door in the Hive (New York: New Directions Publishing, 1989). ISBN 0-8112-1119-3
Evening Train (New York: New Directions Publishing, 1992). ISBN 978-0-8112-1220-5
A Door in the Hive / Evening Train (1993). ISBN 1-85224-159-4
Sands of the Well (New York: New Directions Publishing, 1996). ISBN 0-8112-1361-7
This Great Unknowing: Last Poems (New York: New Directions Publishing, 2000), With a Note on the Text by Paul A. Lacey. ISBN 978-0-8112-1458-2
Poems 1972–1982 (New York: New Directions Publishing, New Directions Paperbook NDP913, 2001). ISBN 0-8112-1469-9

=== Collections ===
- "The Collected Poems of Denise Levertov (NY: New Directions Publishing Corporation, 2013). Edited and Annotated by Paul A. Lacey and Anne Dewey, with an Introduction by Eavan Boland, Afterword by Paul A. Lacey & Anne Dewey. ISBN 978-0-8112-2173-3
- The Life Around Us: Selected Poems on Nature (1997). ISBN 0-8112-1352-8
- Making Peace (NY: New Directions Publishing Corporation, New Directions Bibelot NDP1023, 2005). Edited, with an Introduction, by Peggy Rosenthal
- The Stream & the Sapphire: Selected Poems on Religious Themes (1997). ISBN 978-0-8112-1354-7
- Selected Poems (UK: Bloodaxe Books, 1986). ISBN 0-906427-85-1

This is not to be confused with the 2002 US volume of the same title. From Neil Astley, of Bloodaxe Books:

"Selected Poems (1986) had no editor as such: the book was edited by Bloodaxe Books in consultation with Denise Levertov, with helpful suggestions made by Linda Anderson and Cynthia Fuller. It was originated by Bloodaxe Books for publication in the UK and there was no corresponding US edition. It had no introduction or preface."

- Selected Poems (NY: New Directions Publishing Corporation, 2002). Preface by Robert Creeley, edited with an afterword by Paul A. Lacey
- New Selected Poems (UK: Bloodaxe Books, 2003). Preface by Robert Creeley, edited with an afterword by Paul A. Lacey

The latter two volumes are identical in contents. From Neil Astley, of Bloodaxe Books:

"New Selected Poems was first published in the US by New Directions in 2002 under the title Selected Poems, and published by Bloodaxe Books in the UK in 2003 under the title New Selected Poems to avoid confusion with the previous UK edition called Selected Poems. It was edited with an afterword by Paul A. Lacey and has a preface by Robert Creeley. So it is the same book as New Directions' Selected Poems." ISBN 0811204928

- Light Up the Cave (NY: New Directions Publishing Corporation, 1981). ISBN 0811208133
- Her poems appeared in literary magazines, including Earth's Daughters.

=== Prose ===
- The Poet in the World (NY: New Directions Publishing Corporation, 1973). ISBN 0811204928
- Light Up the Cave (NY: New Directions Publishing Corporation, 1981). ISBN 978-0811208130
- New & Selected Essays (NY: New Directions Publishing Corporation, 1992). ISBN 0-8112-1218-1
- Tesserae: Memories & Suppositions (NY: New Directions Publishing Corporation, 1995). ISBN 0-8112-1337-4

=== Letters ===
- The Letters of Denise Levertov and William Carlos Williams. Edited by Christopher MacGowan (1998).
- The Letters of Robert Duncan and Denise Levertov (Stanford, CA: Stanford University Press, 2004). Edited by Robert J. Bertholf & Albert Gelpi.

=== Translations ===
- Black Iris: Selected Poems by Jean Joubert (Port Townsend, WA: Copper Canyon Press, 1988), Translated from the French by Denise Levertov. ISBN 978-1556590153
- In Praise of Krishna: Songs from the Bengali (Garden City, NY: Doubleday, Anchor Books, 1967), Translated by Edward C. Dimock, Jr. and Denise Levertov, with an introduction and notes by Edward Dimock, Jr., Illustrated by Anju Chaudhuri
- No Matter No Fact (NY: New Directions Publishing Corporation, February 1988), Alain Bosquet. Translated by Samuel Beckett, Eduard Roditi, Denise Levertov, and Alain Bosquet. ISBN 978-0811210393
- Selected Poems by Eugene Guillevic (NY: New Directions Publishing Corporation, 1969)
- White Owl and Blue Mouse (Cambridge, MA: Zoland Books, 1991), Jean Joubert, Illustrations by Michel Gay. ISBN 978-0944072134

=== Edited by Denise Levertov ===
- The Collected Poems of Beatrice Hawley, The (Cambridge, MA: Zoland Books, 1989). Edited and with an Introduction by Denise Levertov. ISBN 9780944072080
- Out of the War Shadow: An Anthology of Current Poetry (NY: War Resisters League, 1967), compiled and edited by Denise Levertov
- Songs from an Outcast (Los Angeles, CA: UCLA American Indian Studies Center, 2000), John E. Smelcer. ISBN 978-0935626452

== Biography ==
- Green, Dana. Denise Levertov: A Poet's Life (Chicago: University of Illinois, 2012). First full biography of the author. ISBN 978 0 252 03710 8
- Hollenberg, Donna Krolik, A Poet's Revolution: The Life of Denise Levertov (Berkeley: University of California Press, 2013). More authoritative biography of the author. ISBN 978 0 520 27246 0

=== Further reading ===
- Keillor, Garrison. "Poems by Denise Levertov", The Writer's Almanac
