= America (poem) =

Poem by Allen Ginsberg

"America" is a poem by Allen Ginsberg, written in 1956 while he was in Berkeley, California. It appears in his collection Howl and Other Poems published in November 1956.

Presented as a stream of consciousness, America is a largely political work, consisting of various accusations against the United States, its government, and its citizens. Ginsberg uses sarcasm to accuse America of attempting to divert responsibility for the Cold War ("America you don't want to go to war/ it's them bad Russians / Them Russians them Russians and them Chinamen. / And them Russians"), and makes numerous references to both leftist and anarchist political movements and figures (including Sacco and Vanzetti, the Scottsboro Boys and the Wobblies). The poem ends with Ginsberg putting his "queer shoulder to the wheel", although the original draft ended on a bleaker note: "Dark America! toward whom I close my eyes for prophecy, / and bend my speaking heart! / Betrayed! Betrayed!"
