= Al Bendich =

American lawyer

- Born: June 18, 1929; New York City, New York
- Died: January 5, 2015 (aged 85); Oakland, California
- Education: B.A., M.A., J.D.
- Occupation: lawyer
- Organization: American Civil Liberties Union
- Spouse: Pamela Bendich
- Children: 4
- Parent(s): Hyman Bendich, Anna Bendich

Albert Morris Bendich (June 18, 1929 – January 5, 2015) was a professor of rhetoric at UC Berkeley, active during the Free Speech Movement (1964-1965), as well as a civil rights attorney, noted for his roles in defending the free speech rights of poet Allen Ginsberg and comedian Lenny Bruce against obscenity charges. Bendich was the ACLU of Northern California's staff counsel from 1957 to 1960. He later became counsel to Saul Zaentz and a partner at Fantasy/Galaxy records and the Saul Zaentz independent film production company.

A quote from his brief during the Howl prosecution: "Would there be any freedom of the press or speech if one must reduce his vocabulary to vapid and innocuous euphemisms? An author should be real in treating his subject and be allowed to express his thoughts and ideas in his own words. – Al Bendich (brief in People v. Ferlinghetti, 1957)

He was born in New York City. His first marriage to Hilary Bendich (nee Solomon) ended in divorce. Bendich died after an apparent heart attack in 2015.

== Cases Litigated ==
- Allen Ginsberg's "Howl"
- Lenny Bruce's comedy routine
- Parrish v. Civil Service Commission (1967 Cal. Sup. Court)
- Board of Trustees v. Jack Owens (see, e.g. Neglected Landmark: California's Jack Owens Case https://www.jstor/stable/20343126)
