= Allen Ginsberg =

American poet and writer (1926–1997)

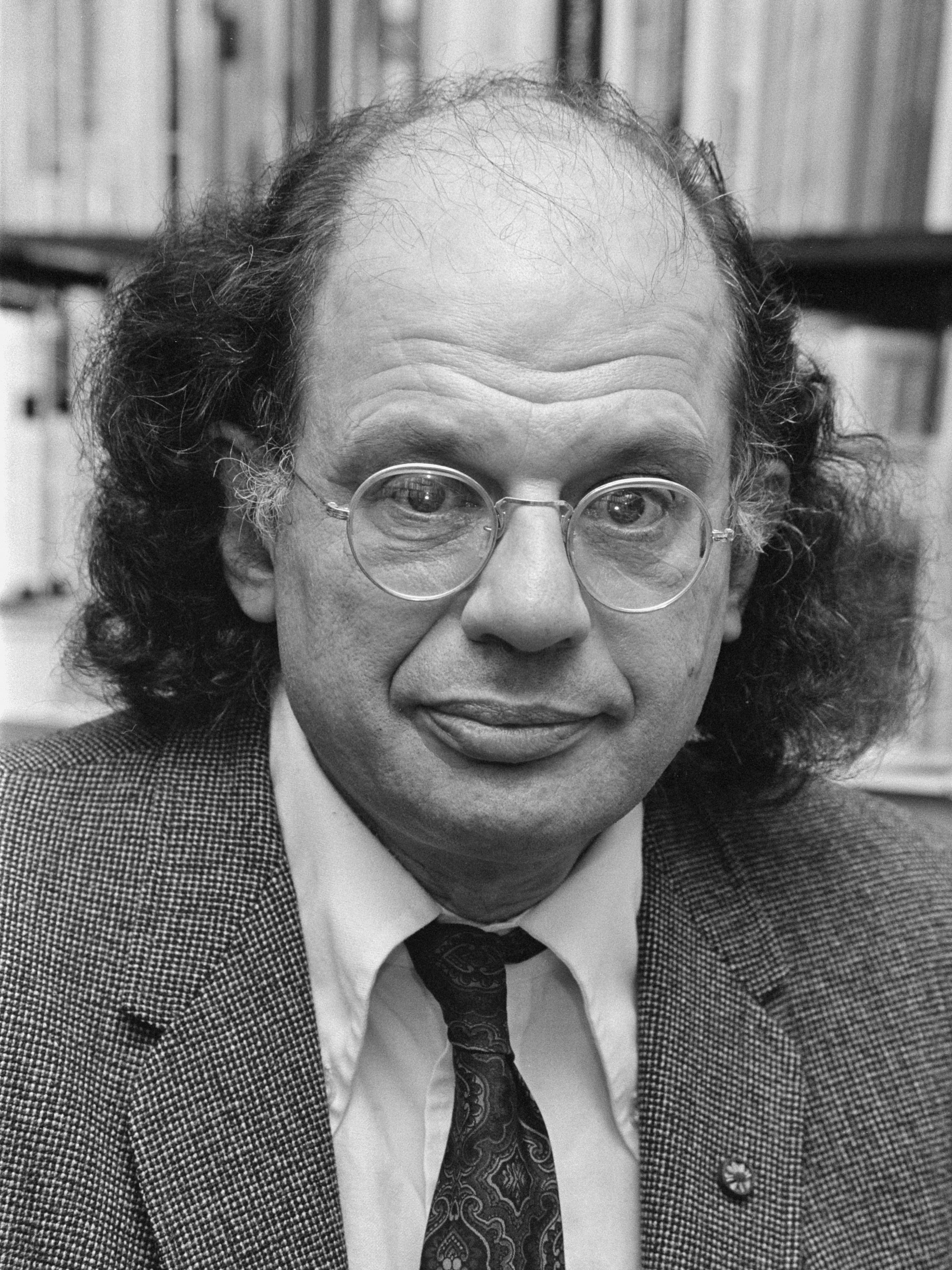
- Ginsberg in 1979
- Born: Irwin Allen Ginsberg; June 3, 1926; Newark, New Jersey, U.S.
- Died: April 5, 1997 (aged 70); New York City, U.S.
- Education: Montclair State University; Columbia University (BA); University of California, Berkeley
- Occupations: Writer; poet
- Partner: Peter Orlovsky (1954–1997)
- Writing career
- Notable work: "Howl"
- Notable awards: National Book Award (1974); Robert Frost Medal (1986)
- Movements: Beat literature Confessional poetry

Irwin Allen Ginsberg (/ˈɡɪnzbɜːrɡ/; June 3, 1926 – April 5, 1997) was an American poet and writer. As a student at Columbia University in the 1940s, he befriended Lucien Carr, William S. Burroughs, and Jack Kerouac, forming the core of the Beat Generation. He vigorously opposed militarism, economic materialism, and sexual repression, and he embodied various aspects of this counterculture with his views on drugs, sex, multiculturalism, hostility to bureaucracy, and openness to Eastern religions.

Best known for his poem "Howl", Ginsberg denounced what he saw as the destructive forces of capitalism and conformity in the United States. San Francisco police and US Customs seized copies of "Howl" in 1956 and a 1957 obscenity trial attracted widespread publicity due to the poem's language and descriptions of heterosexual and homosexual sex at a time when sodomy laws criminalized male homosexual acts in every state. The poem reflected Ginsberg's own sexuality and his relationships with men, including Peter Orlovsky, his lifelong partner. Judge Clayton W. Horn ruled that "Howl" was not obscene, asking: "Would there be any freedom of press or speech if one must reduce his vocabulary to vapid innocuous euphemisms?".

Ginsberg was a Buddhist who extensively studied Eastern religions. He lived modestly, buying his clothing in secondhand stores and residing in apartments in New York City's East Village. One of his most influential teachers was Tibetan Buddhist Chögyam Trungpa, the founder of the Naropa Institute in Boulder, Colorado. At Trungpa's urging, Ginsberg and poet Anne Waldman started The Jack Kerouac School of Disembodied Poetics there in 1974.

For decades, Ginsberg was active in political protests across a range of issues from the Vietnam War to the war on drugs. He also was a vocal member of NAMBLA. His poem "September on Jessore Road" drew attention to refugees fleeing the Bangladesh genocide, exemplifying what literary critic Helen Vendler called Ginsberg's persistent opposition to "imperial politics" and "persecution of the powerless". His collection The Fall of America shared the annual National Book Award for Poetry in 1974. In 1979, he received the National Arts Club gold medal and was inducted into the American Academy of Arts and Letters. He was a Pulitzer Prize finalist in 1995 for his book Cosmopolitan Greetings: Poems 1986–1992.

== Biography ==
=== Early life and family ===
Ginsberg was born into a Jewish family on June 3, 1926, in Newark, New Jersey, and grew up in nearby Paterson. He was the second son of Louis Ginsberg, also born in Newark, a schoolteacher and published poet, and the former Naomi Levy, born in Nevel (Russia) and a fervent Marxist. Naomi Ginsberg was diagnosed with paranoid schizophrenia and institutionalized for extended periods during Ginsberg's childhood, including treatment at Greystone Park State Hospital in New Jersey. Her illness produced paranoid delusions and many suicide attempts. As a teenager, Ginsberg began to write letters to The New York Times about political issues, such as World War II and workers' rights. He published his first poems in the Paterson Morning Call. While in high school, Ginsberg became interested in the works of Walt Whitman, inspired by his teacher's passionate reading. In 1943, Ginsberg graduated from Eastside High School and briefly attended Montclair State College before entering Columbia University on a scholarship from the Young Men's Hebrew Association of Paterson. Ginsberg intended to study law at Columbia but later changed his major to literature.

In 1945, he joined the Merchant Marine to earn money to continue his studies. While at Columbia, Ginsberg contributed to the Columbia Review literary journal, the Jester humor magazine, won the Woodberry Poetry Prize, served as president of the Philolexian Society (a literary and debate group), and joined Boar's Head Society (poetry society). He was a resident of Hartley Hall, where he met other poets such as Jack Kerouac and Herbert Gold. Ginsberg said his required freshman seminar in Great Books, taught by Lionel Trilling, was his favorite course. In 1948, he graduated from Columbia with a B.A. in English and American literature.

Following a legal issue involving stolen goods in his dorm room, Ginsberg pleaded insanity, spending several months in a mental institution.

=== Relationship with his parents ===
Ginsberg referred to his parents in a 1985 interview as "old-fashioned delicatessen philosophers". His mother was also an active member of the Communist Party USA and took Ginsberg and his brother Eugene to party meetings. Ginsberg recalled that her bedtime stories focused on struggling workers and social injustice, introducing him to themes of class struggle and social inequality. Louis Ginsberg was a schoolteacher and poet, known for his traditional lyric poems and encouragement to study literature at home. Emily Dickinson and Henry Wadsworth Longfellow were poets he loved to recite, and he was strongly critical of modern writers like T. S. Eliot.

His mother's schizophrenia significantly shaped Ginsberg's early experiences, including accompanying her to her appointments, and influenced "Howl" and his long autobiographical poem "Kaddish for Naomi Ginsberg (1894–1956)". She had written letters to Ginsberg that are embedded into "Kaddish" and contain imagery such as "The Key" and "sunlight".

=== New York Beats ===
Ginsberg met Lucien Carr as a seventeen year-old freshman at Colombia University. Carr, not a writer himself, acted as a magnetic epicentre, connecting Ginsberg to the larger circle of future Beat writers, including Jack Kerouac, William S. Burroughs, and John Clellon Holmes. The collective of authors aggressively rejected the materialism, consumerism and rigid, conformist social expectations of American society post WW II. Ginsberg and Carr formulated the 'New Vision' (a literary philosophical idea adapted from Yeats' "A Vision"), acting as a foundation for what would soon be the basis for the Beat Generation, Something which would reshape literature and America. Ginsberg was also later introduced to Neal Cassady, with whom Ginsberg would bond and form a close friendship with. In Jack Kerouac's On the Road, the first chapter of the 1957 novel details Ginsberg's and Cassady's first meeting. In Kerouac's definitive novel, "Carlo Marx", serves as veiled pseudonym for Allen Ginsberg, reflecting his leftist politics and anti-capitalist worldview, although Ginsberg was never a member and didn't relate to the communist party. As years passed, their diverging political beliefs led to profound strain between Ginsberg and Kerouac.

In New York, Ginsberg met Gregory Corso following his release from Clinton State Prison, while frequenting bars in Greenwich Village to write poetry. Ginsberg introduced Corso to Kerouac and Burroughs, with the writers travelling and living together across various hubs. Ginsberg and Corso remained lifelong friends and collaborators.

Shortly after this period in Ginsberg's life, he had formed a closer romantic bond with Elise Nada Cowen, someone who was associated with the Beat circle. Over their shared acquaintance Carl Solomon, their romance tapered off as Ginsberg began to embrace his homosexuality. Ginsberg's bond with Carl Solomon grew stronger, dedicating Howl (1956) to Solomon a defining piece of literature for the Beat generation and for which Ginsberg would attract much acclaim and scandal, the poem also acting as a reflection on Ginsberg's experiences in New York and expanding on his relationship with other writers.

=== The "Blake vision" ===
In 1948, in an apartment in East Harlem, Ginsberg experienced an auditory hallucination while masturbating and reading the poetry of William Blake which he later referred to as his "Blake vision". Ginsberg claimed to have heard the voice of God—also described as the "voice of the Ancient of Days"—or of Blake himself reading "Ah! Sun-flower", "The Sick Rose" and "The Little Girl Lost". The experience lasted several days, with him believing that he had profoundly altered his perception of reality and have a deeper understanding of his spirituality and the materialistic world. This became a pivotal moment in his development as it provided him with visionary themes which become central to his work. Later, in 1955, he referenced his "Blake vision" in his poem "Sunflower Sutra", saying "—I rushed up enchanted—it was my first sunflower, memories of Blake—my visions—".

=== San Francisco Renaissance ===
Ginsberg moved to San Francisco during the 1950s, working as a market researcher. In his time there, he became associated with poets that were centred around public readings.

In 1954, in San Francisco, Ginsberg met Peter Orlovsky, who remained his lifelong partner. Selections from their correspondence have been published.

Ginsberg also met members of the San Francisco Renaissance (James Broughton, Robert Duncan, Madeline Gleason and Kenneth Rexroth) and other poets who would later be associated with the Beat Generation in a broader sense. Ginsberg's mentor William Carlos Williams wrote an introductory letter to San Francisco Renaissance figurehead Kenneth Rexroth, who then introduced Ginsberg into the San Francisco poetry scene. There, Ginsberg also met three budding poets and Zen Buddhism enthusiasts who had become friends at Reed College: Gary Snyder, Philip Whalen, and Lew Welch who became a part of the broader beat movement.

On October 7, 1955, Ginsberg was approached by Wally Hedrick—a painter and co-founder of the Six Gallery— who asked him to organize a poetry reading at the Six Gallery. Ginsberg was skeptical at first, but after reading his draft of "Howl" he changed his mind. Ginsberg advertised the event as "Six Poets at the Six Gallery." One of the most important events in the rising of the beat generation. That night included the first public presentation of "Howl," a poem that brought worldwide fame to Ginsberg and to many of the poets associated with him.

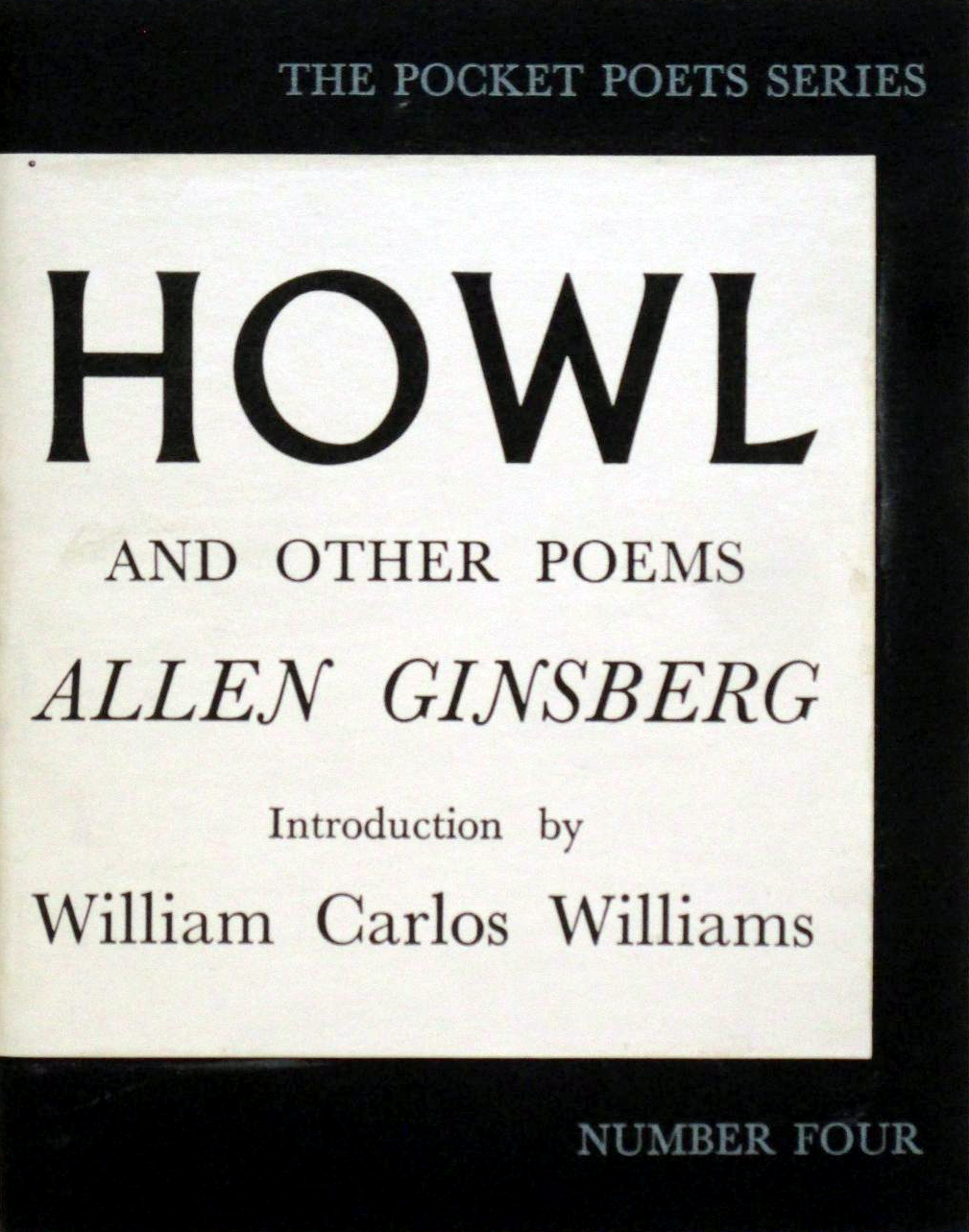
First edition cover of Ginsberg's landmark poetry collection, Howl and Other Poems (1956)

"Howl" was considered scandalous at the time of its publication, because of the rawness of its language. Shortly after its 1956 publication by San Francisco's City Lights Bookstore, it was banned for obscenity. The ban became a cause célèbre among defenders of the First Amendment, and was later lifted, after Judge Clayton W. Horn declared the poem to possess redeeming artistic value. Ginsberg and Shig Murao, the City Lights manager who was jailed for selling "Howl", became lifelong friends.

==== Biographical references in "Howl" ====
Ginsberg viewed his entire literary catalogue as a continuous autobiographical work (Mirroring Kerouac's Duluoz Legend, the semi-autobiographical circuit spanning across many of Kerouac's novels such as On The Road and The Town and The City.) "Howl" merges a personal confession of Ginsberg's experiences before 1955 and offers a portrait of the Beat Generation. Ginsberg also acknowledges that his unresolved emotions concerning his mothers severe mental illness acts as an emotional core for the piece. While "Kaddish" acts as a devastating elegy concerning his mother, Naomi, "Howl" in many ways is driven by these ideas of maternal trauma and grief, as well as the agony of watching someone you love be destroyed by their own mind. "Howl" chronicles the development of many important friendships throughout Ginsberg's life. He begins the poem with "I saw the best minds of my generation destroyed by madness", immortalising key figures within the Beat Generation, such as Neal Cassidy and Carl Solomon within American literature, drawing stylistic inspiration from 19th Century poet Walt Whitman. This madness, an "angry fix" refers metaphorically (and literally) to the desperate avenues marginalised artists and addicts seek out to subdue the pressure of a post-war America, flipping the conventional 1950s values and proposing the mainstream capitalist society as diseased. In the poem, Ginsberg revolves the third section of the poem entirely around the rhythmic refrain, "Carl Solomon! I'm with you in Rockland". By dedicating this part of the poem to his friend, he turned Solomon into an archetypal figure searching for freedom from his "straitjacket". Though references in most of his poetry reveal much about his biography, his relationship to other members of the Beat Generation, and his own political views, "Howl," his most famous poem, is still perhaps the best place to start.

=== To Paris and the "Beat Hotel", Tangier and India ===
In 1957, Ginsberg surprised the literary world by abandoning San Francisco. After a spell in Morocco, he and Peter Orlovsky joined Gregory Corso in Paris. Corso introduced them to a shabby lodging house above a bar at 9 rue Gît-le-Cœur that was to become known as the Beat Hotel. They were soon joined by Burroughs and others. It was a productive, creative time for all of them. There, Ginsberg began his epic poem "Kaddish", Corso composed Bomb and Marriage, and Burroughs (with help from Ginsberg and Corso) put together Naked Lunch from previous writings. This period was documented by the photographer Harold Chapman, who moved in at about the same time, and took pictures constantly of the residents of the "hotel" until it closed in 1963. During 1962–1963, Ginsberg and Orlovsky travelled extensively across India, living half a year at a time in Calcutta (now Kolkata) and Benares (Varanasi). On his road to India he stayed two months in Athens ( August 29, 1961 – October 31, 1961) where he visited various sites such as Delphi, Mycines, Crete, and then continued his journey to Israel, Kenya and finally India. Also during this time, he formed friendships with some of the prominent young Bengali poets of the time including Shakti Chattopadhyay and Sunil Gangopadhyay. Ginsberg had several political connections in India; most notably Pupul Jayakar who helped him extend his stay in India when the authorities were eager to expel him.

=== England and the International Poetry Incarnation ===
In May 1965, Ginsberg arrived in London, and offered to read anywhere for free. Shortly after his arrival, he gave a reading at Better Books, which was described by Jeff Nuttall as "the first healing wind on a very parched collective mind." Tom McGrath wrote: "This could well turn out to have been a very significant moment in the history of England—or at least in the history of English Poetry."

Soon after the bookshop reading, plans were hatched for the International Poetry Incarnation, which was held at the Royal Albert Hall in London on June 11, 1965. The event attracted an audience of 7,000, who heard readings and live and tape performances by a wide variety of figures, including Ginsberg, Adrian Mitchell, Alexander Trocchi, Harry Fainlight, Anselm Hollo, Christopher Logue, George MacBeth, Gregory Corso, Lawrence Ferlinghetti, Michael Horovitz, Simon Vinkenoog, Spike Hawkins and Tom McGrath. The event was organized by Ginsberg's friend, the filmmaker Barbara Rubin.

Peter Whitehead documented the event on film and released it as Wholly Communion. A book featuring images from the film and some of the poems that were performed was also published under the same title by Lorrimer in the UK and Grove Press in US.

=== Continuing literary activity ===
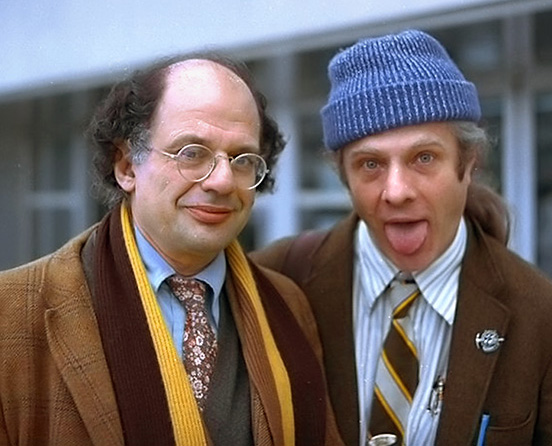
Ginsberg with his partner, poet Peter Orlovsky. Photo taken in 1978

Though the term "Beat" is most accurately applied to Ginsberg and his closest friends (Corso, Orlovsky, Kerouac, Burroughs, etc.), the term "Beat Generation" has become associated with many of the other poets Ginsberg met and became friends with in the late 1950s and early 1960s. A key feature of this term seems to be a friendship with Ginsberg. Friendship with Kerouac or Burroughs might also apply, but both writers later strove to disassociate themselves from the name "Beat Generation." Part of their dissatisfaction with the term came from the mistaken identification of Ginsberg as the leader. Ginsberg never claimed to be the leader of a movement. He claimed that many of the writers with whom he had become friends in this period shared many of the same intentions and themes. Some of these friends include: David Amram, Bob Kaufman; Diane di Prima; Jim Cohn; poets associated with the Black Mountain College such as Charles Olson, Robert Creeley, and Denise Levertov; poets associated with the New York School such as Frank O'Hara and Kenneth Koch. LeRoi Jones before he became Amiri Baraka, who, after reading "Howl", wrote a letter to Ginsberg on a sheet of toilet paper. Baraka's independent publishing house Totem Press published Ginsberg's early work. Through a party organized by Baraka, Ginsberg was introduced to Langston Hughes while Ornette Coleman played saxophone.

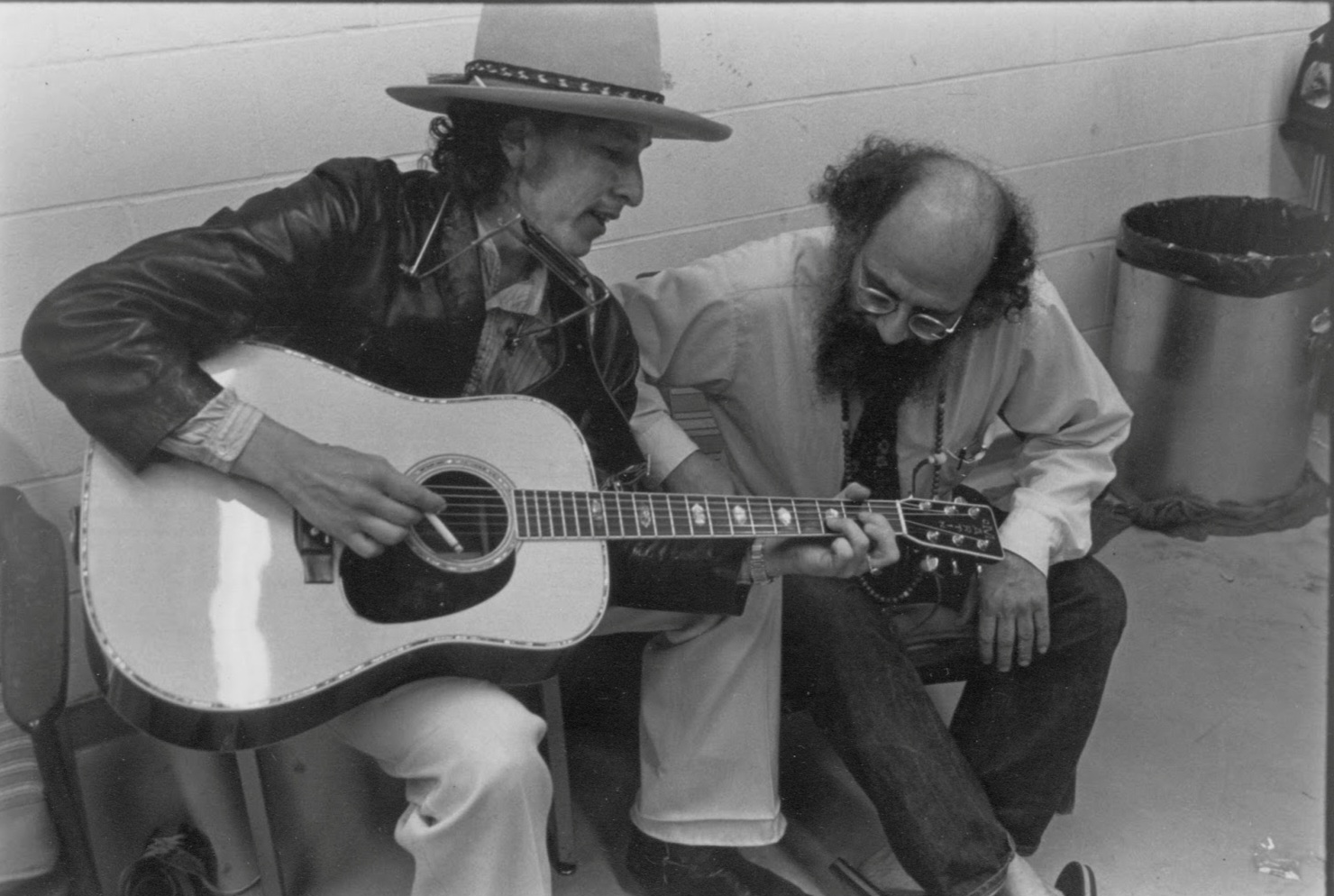
Portrait with Bob Dylan, taken in 1975

Later in his life, Ginsberg formed a bridge between the beat movement of the 1950s and the hippies of the 1960s, befriending, among others, Timothy Leary, Ken Kesey, Hunter S. Thompson, and Bob Dylan. In an article from the Village Voice from 1968 entitled "Allen Ginsberg Explains Timothy Leary", Ginsberg describes Leary as "a hero of American consciousness."

Ginsberg gave his last public reading at Booksmith, a bookstore in the Haight-Ashbury neighborhood of San Francisco, a few months before his death. In 1993, Ginsberg visited the University of Maine at Orono to pay homage to the 90-year-old Carl Rakosi.

=== Buddhism and Krishna ===
In 1950, Kerouac began studying Buddhism and shared what he learned from Dwight Goddard's Buddhist Bible with Ginsberg. Ginsberg first heard about the Four Noble Truths and such sutras as the Diamond Sutra at this time. Ginsberg's endorsement helped establish the Krishna movement within New York's bohemian culture.

Ginsberg's spiritual journey began early on with his spontaneous visions, and continued with an early trip to India with Gary Snyder. Snyder had previously spent time in Kyoto to study at the First Zen Institute at Daitoku-ji Monastery. At one point, Snyder chanted the Prajnaparamita, which in Ginsberg's words "blew my mind." His interest piqued, Ginsberg traveled to meet the Dalai Lama as well as the Karmapa at Rumtek Monastery. Continuing on his journey, Ginsberg met Dudjom Rinpoche in Kalimpong, who taught him: "If you see something horrible, don't cling to it, and if you see something beautiful, don't cling to it."

After returning to the United States, a chance encounter on a New York City street with Chögyam Trungpa Rinpoche (they both tried to catch the same cab), a Kagyu and Nyingma Tibetan Buddhist master, led to Trungpa becoming his friend and lifelong teacher. Ginsberg helped Trungpa and New York poet Anne Waldman in founding the Jack Kerouac School of Disembodied Poetics at Naropa University in Boulder, Colorado.

Ginsberg was also involved with Krishnaism. He had started incorporating chanting the Hare Krishna mantra into his religious practice in the mid-1960s. After learning that A. C. Bhaktivedanta Swami Prabhupada, the founder of the Hare Krishna movement in the Western world had rented a store front in New York, he befriended him, visiting him often and suggesting publishers for his books, and a fruitful relationship began. This relationship is documented by Satsvarupa dasa Goswami in his biographical account Srila Prabhupada Lilamrta. Ginsberg donated money, materials, and his reputation to help the Swami establish the first temple, and toured with him to promote his cause.

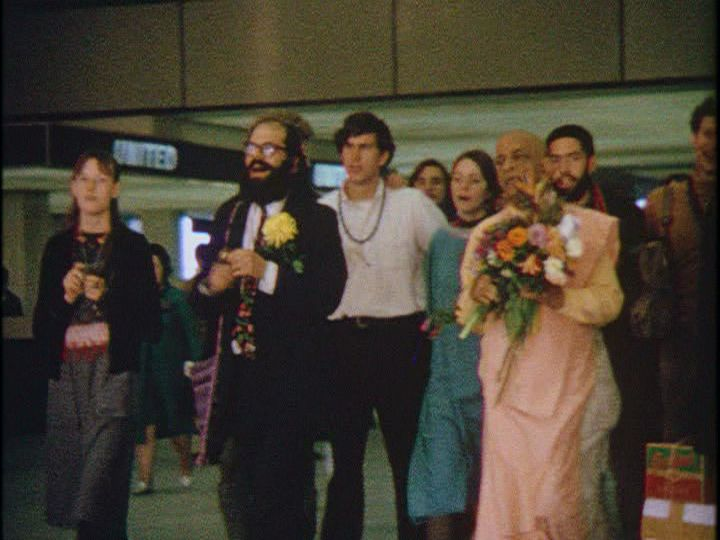
Allen Ginsberg greeting A. C. Bhaktivedanta Swami Prabhupada at San Francisco International Airport. January 17, 1967

Despite disagreeing with many of Bhaktivedanta Swami's required prohibitions, Ginsberg often sang the Hare Krishna mantra publicly as part of his philosophy and declared that it brought a state of ecstasy. He was glad that Bhaktivedanta Swami, an authentic swami from India, was now trying to spread the chanting in America. Along with other counterculture ideologists like Timothy Leary, Gary Snyder, and Alan Watts, Ginsberg hoped to incorporate Bhaktivedanta Swami and his chanting into the hippie movement, and agreed to take part in the Mantra-Rock Dance concert and to introduce the swami to the Haight-Ashbury hippie community. (Note: (from the "Houseboat Summit" panel discussion, Sausalito CA. February 1967)(Cohen 1991, p. 182): Ginsberg: So what do you think of Swami Bhaktivedanta pleading for the acceptance of Krishna in every direction? Snyder: Why, it's a lovely positive thing to say Krishna. It's a beautiful mythology and it's a beautiful practice. Leary: Should be encouraged. Ginsberg: He feels it's the one uniting thing. He feels a monopolistic unitary thing about it. Watts: I'll tell you why I think he feels it. The mantras, the images of Krishna have in this culture no foul association [...] [W]hen somebody comes in from the Orient with a new religion which hasn't got any of [horrible] associations in our minds, all the words are new, all the rites are new, and yet, somehow it has feeling in it, and we can get with that, you see, and we can dig that!)

On January 17, 1967, Ginsberg helped plan and organize a reception for Bhaktivedanta Swami at San Francisco International Airport, where fifty to a hundred hippies greeted the Swami, chanting Hare Krishna in the airport lounge with flowers in hands. (Note: Addressing speculations that he was Allen Ginsberg's guru, Bhaktivedanta Swami answered a direct question in a public program, "Are you Allen Ginsberg's guru?" by saying, "I am nobody's guru. I am everybody's servant. Actually I am not even a servant; a servant of God is no ordinary thing." (Greene 2007, p. 85; Goswami 2011, pp. 196–97)) To further support and promote Bhaktivedanta Swami's message and chanting in San Francisco, Allen Ginsberg agreed to attend the Mantra-Rock Dance, a musical event held in 1967 at the Avalon Ballroom by the San Francisco Hare Krishna temple. It featured some leading rock bands of the time: Big Brother and the Holding Company with Janis Joplin, the Grateful Dead, and Moby Grape, who performed there along with the Hare Krishna founder Bhaktivedanta Swami and donated proceeds to the Krishna temple. Ginsberg introduced Bhaktivedanta Swami to some three thousand hippies in the audience and led the chanting of the Hare Krishna mantra.

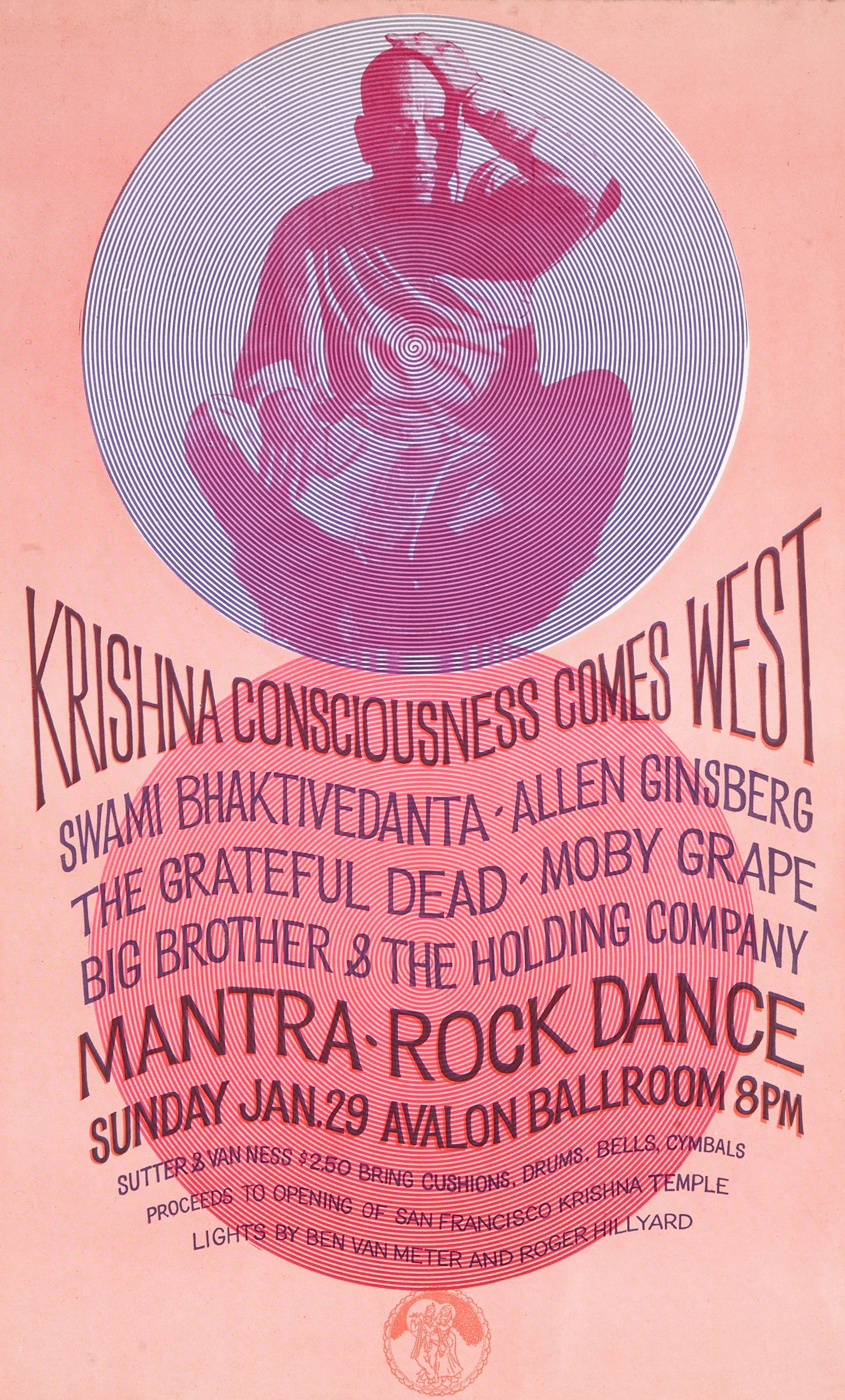
The Mantra-Rock Dance promotional poster featuring Allen Ginsberg along with leading rock bands.

Music and chanting were both important parts of Ginsberg's live delivery during poetry readings. He often accompanied himself on a harmonium, and was often accompanied by a guitarist. It is believed that the Hindi and Buddhist poet Nagarjun had introduced Ginsberg to the harmonium in Banaras. According to Malay Roy Choudhury, Ginsberg refined his practice while learning from his relatives, including his cousin Savitri Banerjee. When Ginsberg asked if he could sing a song in praise of Lord Krishna on William F. Buckley, Jr.'s TV show Firing Line on September 3, 1968, Buckley acceded and the poet chanted slowly as he played dolefully on a harmonium. According to Richard Brookhiser, an associate of Buckley's, the host commented that it was "the most unharried Krishna I've ever heard."

At the 1967 Human Be-In in San Francisco's Golden Gate Park, the 1968 Democratic National Convention in Chicago, and the 1970 Black Panther rally at Yale campus Allen chanted "Om" repeatedly over a sound system for hours on end.

Ginsberg further brought mantras into the world of rock and roll when he recited the Heart Sutra in the song "Ghetto Defendant". The song appears on the 1982 album Combat Rock by British first wave punk band The Clash.

Ginsberg came in touch with the Hungryalist poets of Bengal, especially Malay Roy Choudhury, who introduced Ginsberg to the three fish with one head of Indian emperor Jalaluddin Mohammad Akbar. The three fish symbolised coexistence of all thought, philosophy, and religion.

In spite of Ginsberg's attraction to Eastern religions, the journalist Jane Kramer argues that he, like Whitman, adhered to an "American brand of mysticism" that was "rooted in humanism and in a romantic and visionary ideal of harmony among men."

The Allen Ginsberg Estate and Jewel Heart International partnered to present "Transforming Minds: Kyabje Gelek Rimpoche and Friends", a gallery and online exhibition of images of Gelek Rimpoche by Allen Ginsberg, a student with whom he had an "indissoluble bond," in 2021 at Tibet House US in New York City. Fifty negatives from Ginsberg's Stanford University photo archive celebrated "the unique relationship between Allen and Rimpoche." The selection of never-before presented images, featuring great Tibetan masters including the Dalai Lama, Tibetologists, and students were "guided by Allen's extensive notes on the contact sheets and images he'd circled with the intention to print."

=== Illness and death ===
In 1960, he was treated for a tropical disease, and it is speculated that he contracted hepatitis from an unsterilized needle administered by a doctor, which played a role in his death 37 years later.

Ginsberg was a lifelong smoker, and though he tried to quit for health and religious reasons, his busy schedule in later life made it difficult, and he always returned to smoking.

In the 1970s, Ginsberg had two minor strokes which were first diagnosed as Bell's palsy, which gave him significant paralysis and stroke-like drooping of the muscles in one side of his face. Later in life, he also had constant minor ailments such as high blood pressure. Many of these symptoms were related to stress, but he never slowed down his schedule.

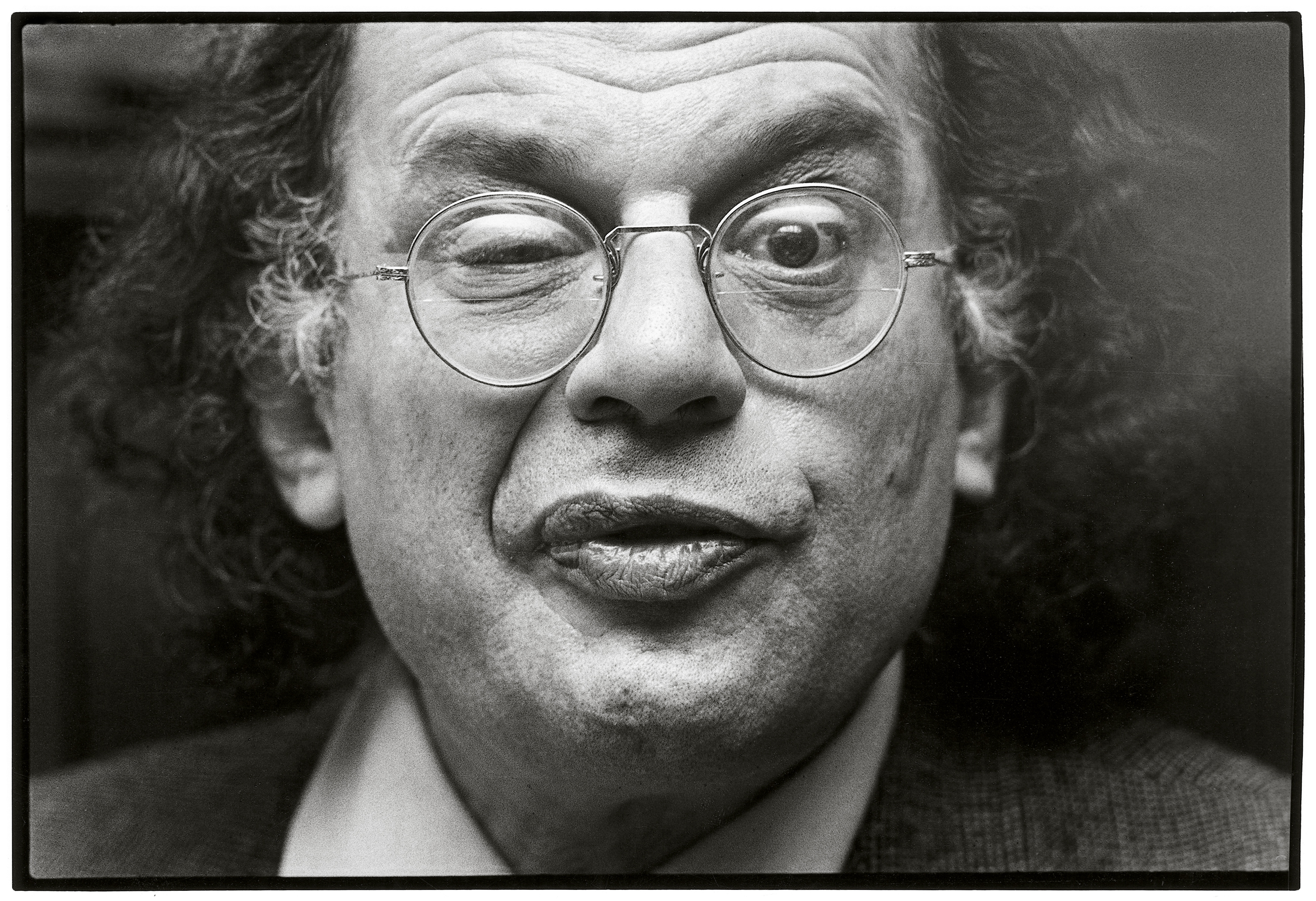
Allen Ginsberg, 1979

Ginsberg won a 1974 National Book Award for The Fall of America (split with Adrienne Rich, Diving into the Wreck).

In 1986, Ginsberg was awarded the Golden Wreath by the Struga Poetry Evenings International Festival in Macedonia, the second American poet to be so awarded since W. H. Auden. At Struga, Ginsberg met with the other Golden Wreath winners, Bulat Okudzhava and Andrei Voznesensky.

In 1989, Ginsberg appeared in Rosa von Praunheim's award-winning film Silence = Death about the fight of gay artists in New York City for AIDS-education and the rights of HIV infected people.

In 1993, the French Minister of Culture appointed Ginsberg a Chevalier des Arts et des Lettres.

Ginsberg continued to help his friends as much as he could: he gave money to Herbert Huncke out of his own pocket, regularly supplied neighbor Arthur Russell with an extension cord to power his home recording setup, and housed a broke, drug-addicted Harry Smith.

With the exception of a special guest appearance at the NYU Poetry Slam on February 20, 1997, Ginsberg gave what is thought to be his last reading at The Booksmith in San Francisco on December 16, 1996.

After returning home from the hospital for the last time, where he had been unsuccessfully treated for congestive heart failure, Ginsberg continued making phone calls to say goodbye to nearly everyone in his address book. Some of the phone calls were sad and interrupted by crying, and others were joyous and optimistic. Ginsberg continued to write through his final illness, with his last poem, "Things I'll Not Do (Nostalgias)", written on March 30.

He died on April 5, 1997, surrounded by family and friends in his East Village loft in Manhattan, succumbing to liver cancer via complications of hepatitis at the age of 70. Gregory Corso, Roy Lichtenstein, Patti Smith and others came by to pay their respects. He was cremated, and his ashes were buried in his family plot in Gomel Chesed Cemetery in Newark. He was survived by Orlovsky.

On May 14, 1998, a tribute event took place at the Cathedral of St. John the Divine attended by some 2,500 of Ginsberg's friends and fans.

In August 1998, various writers, including Catfish McDaris, read at a gathering at Ginsberg's farm to honor Allen and the Beats.

Good Will Hunting (released in December 1997) was dedicated to Ginsberg, as well as Burroughs, who died four months later.

== Social and political activism ==
=== CIA drug trafficking ===
Ginsberg worked closely with Alfred W. McCoy on the latter's book The Politics of Heroin in Southeast Asia, which claimed that the CIA was knowingly involved in the production of heroin in the Golden Triangle of Burma, Thailand, and Laos. In addition to working with McCoy, Ginsberg personally confronted Richard Helms, the director of the CIA in the 1970s, about the matter, but Helms denied that the CIA had anything to do with selling illegal drugs. Ginsberg wrote many essays and articles, researching and compiling evidence of the CIA's alleged involvement in drug trafficking, but it took ten years, and the publication of McCoy's book in 1972, before anyone took him seriously. In 1978, Ginsberg received a note from the chief editor of The New York Times, apologizing for not having taken his allegations seriously. The political subject is dealt with in his song/poem "CIA Dope calypso". The United States Department of State responded to McCoy's initial allegations stating that they were "unable to find any evidence to substantiate them, much less proof." Subsequent investigations by the Inspector General of the CIA, United States House Committee on Foreign Affairs, and United States Senate Select Committee to Study Governmental Operations with Respect to Intelligence Activities, a.k.a. the Church Committee, also found the charges to be unsubstantiated.

=== Free speech ===
Ginsberg's willingness to talk about taboo subjects made him a controversial figure during the conservative 1950s, and a significant figure in the 1960s. In the mid-1950s, no reputable publishing company would even consider publishing Howl. At the time, such "sex talk" employed in Howl was considered by some to be vulgar or even a form of pornography, and could be prosecuted under law. Ginsberg used phrases such as "cocksucker", "fucked in the ass", and "cunt" as part of the poem's depiction of different aspects of American culture. Numerous books that discussed sex were banned at the time, including Lady Chatterley's Lover. The sex that Ginsberg described did not portray the sex between heterosexual married couples, or even longtime lovers. Instead, Ginsberg portrayed casual sex. For example, in Howl, Ginsberg praises the man "who sweetened the snatches of a million girls." Ginsberg used gritty descriptions and explicit sexual language, pointing out the man "who lounged hungry and lonesome through Houston seeking jazz or sex or soup." In his poetry, Ginsberg also discussed the then-taboo topic of homosexuality. The explicit sexual language that filled Howl eventually led to an important trial on First Amendment issues. Additionally, Ginsberg attempted to defend ‘Howl’ in his poem ‘America’. Ginsberg's publisher was brought up on charges for publishing pornography, and the outcome led to a judge going on record dismissing charges, because the poem carried "redeeming social importance," thus setting an important legal precedent. Ginsberg continued to broach controversial subjects throughout the 1970s, 1980s, and 1990s.

Thirty years after the court case where Judge Horn ruled that ‘Howl’ was not obscene, a different case was brought up against it. Formed by Reverend Jerry Falwell, the political/religious minority known as “Moral Majority” began to “exert pressure on government to control what the group perceived to be obscenity and indecency in art music and literature.

Ginsberg himself spoke out in 1990 discussing the censorship of his poetry and how it reflects on society and is a “violation of our freedom of expression.” He discusses his petition for the right to exercise his own liberty of speech guaranteed by the constitution. His final point states, “I have my own agenda for emotional and intellectual and political liberty in the U.S.A. and behind the Iron Curtain. This is expressed in my poetry.”

From 1970 to 1996, Ginsberg had a long-term affiliation with PEN American Center with efforts to defend free expression. When explaining how he approached controversial topics, he often pointed to Herbert Huncke: he said that when he first got to know Huncke in the 1940s, Ginsberg saw that he was sick from his heroin addiction, but at the time heroin was a taboo subject and Huncke was left with nowhere to go for help.

=== Gay rights ===
One contribution that is often considered his most significant and most controversial was his openness about homosexuality. Ginsberg was an early proponent of freedom for gay people. In 1943, he discovered within himself "mountains of homosexuality." He expressed this desire openly and graphically in his poetry. He also struck a note for gay marriage by listing Peter Orlovsky, his lifelong companion, as his spouse in his Who's Who entry. Subsequent gay writers saw his frank talk about homosexuality as an opening to speak more openly and honestly about something often before only hinted at or spoken of in metaphor.

Throughout his writing, Ginsberg expressed his disagreements and critiques of obscenity laws. He wrote explicitly about sexuality in graphic detail—often using language deemed as indecent. This act of rebellion, helped change obscenity laws. Along with his own actions, Ginsberg was a staunch supporter of others whose expression challenged obscenity laws (William S. Burroughs and Lenny Bruce, for example).

Despite having an openly homosexual lifestyle, Ginsberg himself still maintained highly conservative views. This also includes offering advice to closeted homosexuals that firmly contradicts his own actions. This is evident within the testimony of Peter Hale, who stated that upon asking Ginsberg for advice, was told to 'get a wife, settle down, and have kids'. This suggests that despite all of Ginsberg's protests and willingness to subvert societal expectations to change laws, this appears to be only one side of the poet, the other side being that he was 'very much a traditionalist'. Hale interpreted his advice as to not live the life of the itinerant poet going around heartbroken, forever unfulfilled. This is a highly paradoxical suggestion and even connotes that Ginsberg himself was struggling with the consequences of his homosexuality.

=== NAMBLA membership ===
Ginsberg was a supporter and member of the North American Man/Boy Love Association (NAMBLA), a pedophilia and pederasty advocacy organization in the United States that works to abolish age of consent laws and legalize sexual relations between adults and children. Saying that he joined the organization "in defense of free speech", Ginsberg stated: "Attacks on NAMBLA stink of politics, witchhunting for profit, humorlessness, vanity, anger and ignorance ... I'm a member of NAMBLA because I love boys too—everybody does, who has a little humanity". In 1994, Ginsberg appeared in a documentary on NAMBLA called Chicken Hawk: Men Who Love Boys (playing on the gay male slang term 'chickenhawk'), in which he read a "graphic ode to youth". He read his poem "Sweet Boy, Gimme Yr Ass" from the book Mind Breaths, a collection of poems he called a "pederast rhapsody" that features graphic depictions of sex with boys.

In her 2002 book Heartbreak, Andrea Dworkin claimed Ginsberg had ulterior motives for allying with NAMBLA:

In 1982, newspapers reported in huge headlines that the Supreme Court had ruled child pornography illegal. I was thrilled. I knew Allen would not be. I did think he was a civil libertarian. But, in fact, he was a pedophile. He did not belong to the North American Man/Boy Love Association out of some mad, abstract conviction that its voice had to be heard. He meant it. I take this from what Allen said directly to me, not from some inference I made. He was exceptionally aggressive about his right to fuck children and his constant pursuit of underage boys.

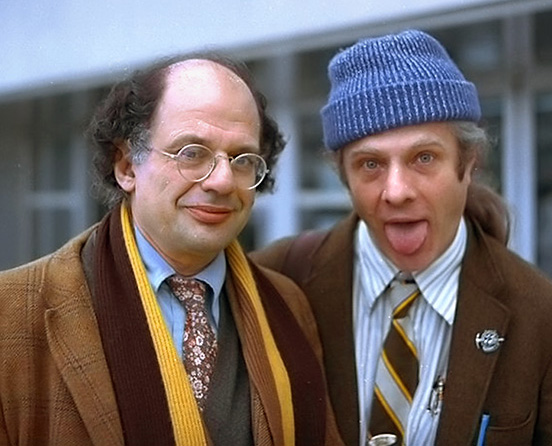
Allan Ginsberg and Peter Orlowski

In reference to his onetime friend Dworkin, Ginsberg stated:

I've known Andrea since she was a student. I had a conversation with her when I said I've had many young affairs, [with those who were] 16, 17, or 18. I said, 'What are you going to do, send me to jail?' And she said, 'You should be shot.' The problem is, she was molested when she was young, and she hasn't recovered from the trauma, and she's taking it out on ordinary lovers.

=== Recreational drugs ===
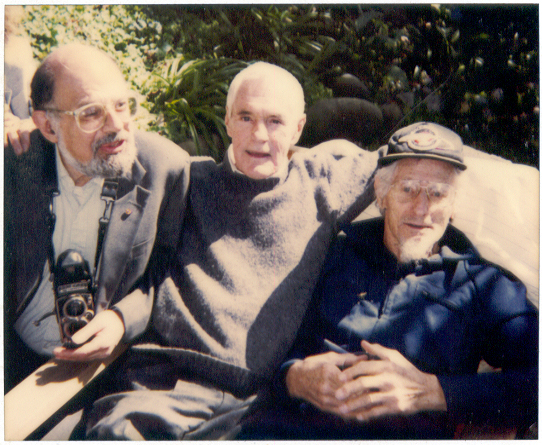
Allen Ginsberg, Timothy Leary, and John C. Lilly in 1991

Ginsberg talked often about drug use. He organized the New York City chapter of LeMar (Legalize Marijuana). Throughout the 1960s he took an active role in the demystification of LSD, and, with Timothy Leary, worked to promote its common use. He remained for many decades an advocate of marijuana legalization, and, at the same time, warned his audiences against the hazards of tobacco in his Put Down Your Cigarette Rag (Don't Smoke): "Don't Smoke Don't Smoke Nicotine Nicotine No / No don't smoke the official Dope Smoke Dope Dope."

=== Relationship to communism ===
Ginsberg talked openly about his connections with communism and his admiration for past communist heroes and the labor movement at a time when the Red Scare and McCarthyism were still raging. He admired Fidel Castro and many other Marxist figures from the 20th century. Ginsberg was a member of the Fair Play for Cuba Committee. In "America" (1956), Ginsberg writes: "America, I used to be a communist when I was a kid I'm not sorry". Biographer Jonah Raskin has claimed that, despite his often stark opposition to communist orthodoxy, Ginsberg held "his own idiosyncratic version of communism." On the other hand, when Donald Manes, a New York City politician, publicly accused Ginsberg of being a member of the Communist Party, Ginsberg objected: "I am not, as a matter of fact, a member of the Communist party, nor am I dedicated to the overthrow of the U.S. government or any government by violence ... I must say that I see little difference between the armed and violent governments both Communist and Capitalist that I have observed".

Ginsberg travelled to several communist countries to promote free speech. He claimed that communist countries, such as China, welcomed him because they thought he was an enemy of capitalism, but often turned against him when they saw him as a troublemaker. For example, in 1965 Ginsberg was deported from Cuba for publicly protesting the persecution of homosexuals. The Cubans sent him to Czechoslovakia, where one week after being named the Král majálesu ("King of May", a students' festivity, celebrating spring and student life), Ginsberg was arrested for alleged drug use and public drunkenness. In a report made by the Chief of Division II. Of the Ministry of Interior, Lieutenant Colonel Miloslav Kosnar, Ginsberg had allegedly “badmouthed the Soviet Union” and spoken out about the communist government. The report then proceeds to provide more examples of his anti-communist behaviour stating “he did not hide his anti-communism and antipathy.” The students of the School of Engineering in Czechoslovakia accepted Ginsberg uncritically, particularly the passages he read to them, discussing the lack of freedom in the country.

Ginsberg was arrested once on 3 May for inebriation and arousing public outcry for which he was sent to a detoxification facility where he was not accepted and then on 5 May he was arrested again for participating in a disturbance where, after the authorities arrived, he fled. The security agency StB confiscated several of his writings, which they considered to be lewd and morally dangerous. Ginsberg was then deported from Czechoslovakia on May 7, 1965, by order of the StB. Václav Havel points to Ginsberg as an important inspiration.

=== Role in Vietnam War protests ===
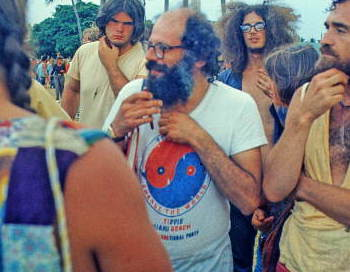
Protesting at the 1972 Republican National Convention

Ginsberg was a signer of the anti-war manifesto "A Call to Resist Illegitimate Authority", circulated among draft resistors in 1967 by members of the radical intellectual collective RESIST. Other signers and RESIST members included Henry Braun, Noam Chomsky, William Sloane Coffin, Mitchell Goodman, Denise Levertov, Robert Lowell, Dwight Macdonald, and Norman Mailer. In 1968, Ginsberg signed the "Writers and Editors War Tax Protest" pledge, vowing to refuse tax payments in protest against the Vietnam War, and later became a sponsor of the War Tax Resistance project, which practiced and advocated tax resistance as a form of anti-war protest.

He was present the night of the Tompkins Square Park riot (1988) and provided an eyewitness account to The New York Times.

== Work ==
Most of Ginsberg's very early poetry was written in formal rhyme and meter like that of his father, and of his idol William Blake. His admiration for the writing of Jack Kerouac inspired him to take poetry more seriously. In 1955, upon the advice of a psychiatrist, Ginsberg dropped out of the working world to devote his entire life to poetry. Soon after, he began writing his first of many draft of Howl, which he then published the following year. This was the poem that brought him and his Beat Generation contemporaries to national attention and allowed him to live as a professional poet for the rest of his life. Later in life, Ginsberg entered academia, teaching poetry as Distinguished Professor of English at Brooklyn College from 1986 until his death.

=== Inspiration from friends ===
Ginsberg's biggest inspiration was Kerouac's concept of "spontaneous prose." He emphasised a writer's emotions and natural mode of expression within prose. Ginsberg was much more prone to revise than Kerouac. For example, when Kerouac saw the first draft of Howl, he disliked the fact that Ginsberg had made editorial changes in pencil (transposing "negro" and "angry" in the first line, for example). Kerouac only wrote out his concepts of spontaneous prose at Ginsberg's insistence because Ginsberg wanted to learn how to apply the technique to his poetry.

The inspiration for Howl was Ginsberg's friend, Carl Solomon, and Howl is dedicated to him. Solomon was a Dada and Surrealism enthusiast (he introduced Ginsberg to Artaud) who had been confined to a psychiatric institution and committed himself for shock therapy. Much of the final section of the first part of Howl is a description of this. Despite this apparent tribute, Solomon later critiqued the poem claiming that the later sections of the poem 'garbles history completely' as they in fact, were never in Rockland. This means that despite the poem being dedicated towards Solomon, creative liberties and 'poetic fabrications' have occurred.

Ginsberg used Solomon as an example of all those ground down by the machine of "Moloch." Moloch, to whom the second section is addressed, is a Levantine god to whom children were sacrificed. Ginsberg may have gotten the name from the Kenneth Rexroth poem "Thou Shalt Not Kill," a poem about the death of one of Ginsberg's heroes, Dylan Thomas, a Welsh poet and writer whom also had influence on Ginsberg's early works. Moloch is mentioned a few times in the Torah and references to Ginsberg's Jewish background are frequent in his work. Ginsberg said the image of Moloch was inspired by peyote visions he had of the Francis Drake Hotel in San Francisco which appeared to him as a skull; he took it as a symbol of the city (not specifically San Francisco, but all cities). Ginsberg later acknowledged in various publications and interviews that behind the visions of the Francis Drake Hotel were memories of the Moloch of Fritz Lang's film Metropolis (1927) and of the woodcut novels of Lynd Ward. Moloch has subsequently been interpreted as any system of control, including the conformist society of post-World War II America, focused on material gain, which Ginsberg frequently blamed for the destruction of all those outside of societal norms.

The personal aspects of Howl are perhaps as important as the political aspects. Carl Solomon, the prime example of a "best mind" destroyed by defying society, is associated with Ginsberg's schizophrenic mother: the line "with mother finally fucked" comes after a long section about Carl Solomon, and in Part III, Ginsberg says: "I'm with you in Rockland where you imitate the shade of my mother." Ginsberg later admitted that the drive to write Howl was fueled by sympathy for his ailing mother, an issue which he was not yet ready to deal with directly. He dealt with it directly with 1959's Kaddish, which had its first public reading at a Catholic Worker Friday Night meeting, possibly due to its associations with Thomas Merton.

=== Inspiration from mentors and idols ===
Ginsberg's poetry was strongly influenced by Modernism (most importantly the American style of Modernism pioneered by William Carlos Williams), Romanticism (specifically William Blake and John Keats), the beat and cadence of jazz (specifically that of bop musicians such as Charlie Parker), and his Kagyu Buddhist practice and Jewish background. He considered himself to have inherited the visionary poetic mantle handed down from the English poet and artist William Blake, the American poet Walt Whitman and the Spanish poet Federico García Lorca. The power of Ginsberg's verse, its searching, probing focus, its long and lilting lines, as well as its New World exuberance, all echo the continuity of inspiration that he claimed.

He corresponded with William Carlos Williams, who was then in the middle of writing his epic poem Paterson about the industrial city near his home. After attending a reading by Williams, Ginsberg sent him some of his older poems, along with an introductory letter. Most of these early poems were rhymed and metered and included archaic pronouns like "thee." Williams offered Ginsberg some advice, such as 'don't emulate old masters', 'speak with your own voice', 'use strong visual imagery' and 'shift from formal to free-verse', to which Allen listened to and used for his poem 'Howl'.

Though he disliked these early poems, Williams loved the exuberance in Ginsberg's letter. He included the letter in a later part of Paterson.

Carl Solomon introduced Ginsberg to the work of Antonin Artaud (To Have Done with the Judgement of God and Van Gogh: The Man Suicided by Society), and Jean Genet (Our Lady of the Flowers). Philip Lamantia introduced him to other Surrealists and Surrealism continued to be an influence (for example, sections of "Kaddish" were inspired by André Breton's Free Union). Ginsberg claimed that the anaphoric repetition of Howl and other poems was inspired by Christopher Smart in such poems as Jubilate Agno. Ginsberg also claimed other more traditional influences, such as: Franz Kafka, Herman Melville, Fyodor Dostoevsky, Edgar Allan Poe, and Emily Dickinson.

Ginsberg also made an intense study of haiku and the paintings of Paul Cézanne, from which he adapted a concept important to his work, which he called the Eyeball Kick. He noticed in viewing Cézanne's paintings that when the eye moved from one color to a contrasting color, the eye would spasm, or "kick." Likewise, he discovered that the contrast of two seeming opposites was a common feature in haiku. Ginsberg used this technique in his poetry, putting together two starkly dissimilar images: something weak with something strong, an artifact of high culture with an artifact of low culture, something holy with something unholy. The example Ginsberg most often used was "hydrogen jukebox" (which later became the title of a song cycle composed by Philip Glass with lyrics drawn from Ginsberg's poems). Another example is Ginsberg's observation on Bob Dylan during Dylan's hectic and intense 1966 electric-guitar tour, fueled by a cocktail of amphetamines, opiates, alcohol, and psychedelics, as a Dexedrine Clown. The phrases "eyeball kick" and "hydrogen jukebox" both show up in Howl, as well as a direct quote from Cézanne: "Pater Omnipotens Aeterna Deus".

=== Inspiration from music ===
Allen Ginsberg also found inspiration in music. He frequently included music in his poetry, invariably composing his tunes on an old Indian harmonium, which he often played during his readings. He wrote and recorded music to accompany William Blake's Songs of Innocence and Songs of Experience. He also recorded a handful of other albums. To create music for Howl and Wichita Vortex Sutra, he worked with the minimalist composer, Philip Glass.

Ginsberg worked with, drew inspiration from, and inspired artists such as Bob Dylan, The Clash, Patti Smith, Phil Ochs, and The Fugs. He worked with Dylan on various projects and maintained a friendship with him over many years.

In 1981, Ginsberg recorded a song called "Birdbrain." He was backed by the Gluons, and the track was released as a single. In 1996, he recorded a song co-written with Paul McCartney and Philip Glass, "The Ballad of the Skeletons", which reached number 8 on the Triple J Hottest 100 for that year.

=== Style and technique ===
From the study of his idols and mentors and the inspiration of his friends—not to mention his own experiments—Ginsberg developed an individualistic style that's easily identified as Ginsbergian. Ginsberg stated that Whitman's long line was a dynamic technique few other poets had ventured to develop further, and Whitman is also often compared to Ginsberg because their poetry sexualized aspects of the male form.

Many of Ginsberg's early long line experiments contain some sort of anaphora, repetition of a "fixed base" (for example "who" in Howl, "America" in America) and this has become a recognizable feature of Ginsberg's style. He said later this was a crutch because he lacked confidence; he did not yet trust "free flight." In the 1960s, after employing it in some sections of Kaddish ("caw" for example) he, for the most part, abandoned the anaphoric form. "Latter-Day Beat" Bob Dylan is known for using anaphora, as in "Tangled Up in Blue" where the phrase, returned to at the end of every verse, takes the place of a chorus.

Several of his earlier experiments with methods for formatting poems as a whole became regular aspects of his style in later poems. In the original draft of Howl, each line is in a "stepped triadic" format reminiscent of William Carlos Williams. He abandoned the "stepped triadic" when he developed his long line although the stepped lines showed up later, most significantly in the travelogues of The Fall of America. Howl and Kaddish, arguably his two most important poems, are both organized as an inverted pyramid, with larger sections leading to smaller sections. In America, he also experimented with a mix of longer and shorter lines.

Ginsberg's mature style made use of many specific, highly developed techniques, which he expressed in the "poetic slogans" he used in his Naropa teaching. Prominent among these was the inclusion of his unedited mental associations so as to reveal the mind at work ("First thought, best thought." "Mind is shapely, thought is shapely.") He preferred expression through carefully observed physical details rather than abstract statements ("Show, don't tell." "No ideas but in things.") In these he carried on and developed traditions of modernism in writing that are also found in his contemporary Jack Kerouac and 19th-century American poet Walt Whitman.

In Howl and in his other poetry, Ginsberg drew inspiration from the epic, free verse style of Whitman. Like Ginsberg, Whitman had written passionately about the promise (and betrayal) of American democracy, the central importance of erotic experience, and the spiritual quest for the truth of everyday existence. Whitman scholar Ed Folsom has traced Ginsberg's engagement with the nineteenth-century poet to Federico García Lorca's 1940 "Ode to Walt Whitman," arguing that Ginsberg's famous 1955 Whitman poem "A Supermarket in California" inherited its surreal quality and concern with Whitman's sexuality. Folsom argued that unlike Ezra Pound, who rejected Whitman's long line, Ginsberg embraced and extended it, setting "the tone of the dominant contemporary American dialogue with Whitman" that was marked by a sense of loss over America's diminished democratic promise. Folsom also noted that Ginsberg's engagement with Whitman continued throughout his career, including in the 1972 collection The Fall of America, dedicated to Whitman's "intense and loving comradeship," and in the late poem "I Love Old Whitman So." J. D. McClatchy, editor of the Yale Review considered Ginsberg "the best-known American poet of his generation." Like Whitman, Ginsberg "was a bard in the old manner—outsized, darkly prophetic, part exuberance, part prayer, part rant. His work is finally a history of our era's psyche, with all its contradictory urges." McClatchy's barbed eulogies also defined the essential difference between Ginsberg ("a beat poet whose writing was ... journalism raised by combining the recycling genius with a generous mimic-empathy, to strike audience-accessible chords; always lyrical and sometimes truly poetic") and Kerouac ("a poet of singular brilliance, the brightest luminary of a 'beat generation' he came to symbolise in popular culture ... [though] in reality he far surpassed his contemporaries ... Kerouac is an originating genius, exploring then answering—like Rimbaud a century earlier, by necessity more than by choice—the demands of authentic self-expression as applied to the evolving quicksilver mind of America's only literary virtuoso").

== Honors ==
His collection The Fall of America shared the annual U.S. National Book Award for Poetry in 1974.

Ginsberg won a 1974 National Book Award for The Fall of America (split with Adrienne Rich, Diving into the Wreck).

In 1979, he received the National Arts Club gold medal and was inducted into the American Academy and Institute of Arts and Letters.

In 1986, Ginsberg was awarded the Golden Wreath by the Struga Poetry Evenings International Festival in Macedonia, the second American poet to be so awarded since W. H. Auden. At Struga, Ginsberg met with the other Golden Wreath winners, Bulat Okudzhava and Andrei Voznesensky.

In 1989, Ginsberg appeared in Rosa von Praunheim's award-winning film Silence = Death about the fight of gay artists in New York City for AIDS-education and the rights of HIV infected people.

In 1993, the French Minister of Culture appointed Ginsberg a Chevalier des Arts et des Lettres. Ginsberg was a Pulitzer Prize finalist in 1995 for his book Cosmopolitan Greetings: Poems 1986–1992. In 1993, he received a John Jay Award from Columbia.

In 2014, Ginsberg was one of the inaugural honorees in the Rainbow Honor Walk, a walk of fame in San Francisco's Castro neighborhood noting LGBTQ people who have "made significant contributions in their fields."

In 2026, many events were organized to mark the centenary of Ginsberg's birth, with help from the Allen Ginsberg Estate. Held under the title Ginsberg at 100, the events included programs at New York venues such as St. Mark's Church and Anthology Film Archives, as well as other places in the United States and Europe.

== Bibliography ==
- Howl and Other Poems (1956), ISBN 978-0-87286-017-9
- Kaddish and Other Poems (1961), ISBN 978-0-87286-019-3
- Empty Mirror: Early Poems (1961), ISBN 978-0-87091-030-2
- Reality Sandwiches (1963), ISBN 978-0-87286-021-6
- The Yage Letters (1963) – with William S. Burroughs
- Planet News (1968), ISBN 978-0-87286-020-9
- Indian Journals (1970), ISBN 0-8021-3475-0
- First Blues: Rags, Ballads & Harmonium Songs 1971 - 1974 (1975), ISBN 0-916190-05-6
- The Gates of Wrath: Rhymed Poems 1948–1951 (1972), ISBN 978-0-912516-01-1
- The Fall of America: Poems of These States (1973), ISBN 978-0-87286-063-6
- Iron Horse (1973)
- Allen Verbatim: Lectures on Poetry, Politics, Consciousness by Allen Ginsberg (1974), edited by Gordon Ball, ISBN 0-07-023285-7
- Sad Dust Glories: poems during work summer in woods (1975)
- Mind Breaths (1978), ISBN 978-0-87286-092-6
- Plutonian Ode: Poems 1977–1980 (1981), ISBN 978-0-87286-125-1
- Collected Poems 1947–1980 (1984), ISBN 978-0-06-015341-0. Republished with later material added as Collected Poems 1947-1997, New York, HarperCollins, 2006
- White Shroud Poems: 1980–1985 (1986), ISBN 978-0-06-091429-5
- Cosmopolitan Greetings Poems: 1986–1993 (1994)
- Howl Annotated (1995)
- Illuminated Poems (1996)
- Selected Poems: 1947–1995 (1996)
- Death and Fame: Poems 1993–1997 (1999)
- Deliberate Prose 1952–1995 (2000)
- Howl & Other Poems 50th Anniversary Edition (2006), ISBN 978-0-06-113745-7
- The Book of Martyrdom and Artifice: First Journals and Poems 1937-1952 (Da Capo Press, 2006)
- The Selected Letters of Allen Ginsberg and Gary Snyder (Counterpoint, 2009)
- I Greet You at the Beginning of a Great Career: The Selected Correspondence of Lawrence Ferlinghetti and Allen Ginsberg, 1955–1997 (City Lights, 2015)
- The Best Minds of My Generation: A Literary History of the Beats (Grove Press, 2017)
- On The Road (1957) Jack Kerouac by Viking Press
- The Town And The City (1950) Jack Kerouac by Harcourt Brace
- Remembering pain in Allen Ginsberg’s ‘Kaddish’,Eliades, M. (2018) Ploughshares. Available at: https://pshares.org/blog/remembering-pain-in-allen-ginsbergs-kaddish/.

== Selected discography ==
- Howl And Other Poems (1959), Fantasy - 7006
- None (1965), with Gregory Corso, Lawrence Ferlinghetti, and Andrei Voznesensky Lovebooks - LB0001
- Allen Ginsberg Reading at Better Books (1965), Better Books – 16156/57
- Reads Kaddish (A 20th Century American Ecstatic Narrative Poem) (1966), Atlantic – 4001
- The Ginsbergs At The ICA (1967), with Louise Ginsberg Saga Psyche – PSY 3000
- Consciousness & Practical Action (1967), Liberation Records – DL 16
- Challenge Seminar (1968), with Gregory Bateson and R. D. Laing Liberation Records – DL 23
- Ginsberg's Thing (1969), Transatlantic Records – TRA 192
- Songs Of Innocence And Experience (1970), MGM Records – FTS-3083, Verve Forecast – FTS-3083
- America Today! (The World's Greatest Poets Vol. I) (1971), with Gregory Corso and Lawrence Ferlinghetti CMS – CMS 617
- Gate, Two Evenings With Allen Ginsberg Vol.1 Songs (1980), Loft – LOFT 1001
- First Blues: Rags, Ballads & Harmonium Songs (1981), Folkways Records – FSS 37560
- First Blues (1983), John Hammond Records – W2X 37673
- Allen Ginsberg With Still Life (1983), with Still Life Local Anesthetic Records – LA LP-001
- Üvöltés (1987), with Hobo Krém – SLPM 37048
- The Lion For Real (1989), Great Jones – GJ-6004
- September On Jessore Road (1992), with the Mondriaan Quartet Soyo Records – 0001
- Cosmopolitan Greetings (1993), with George Gruntz Schweiz – MGB CD 9203, Migros-Genossenschafts-Bund – MGB CD 9203
- Hydrogen Jukebox (1993), with Philip Glass Elektra Nonesuch – 9 79286–2
- Allen Ginsberg: Material Wealth (Allen's voice in poems and songs 1956–1996) (2024)

== Film appearances and portrayals ==
- Wholly Communion, filmed at the Royal Albert Hall in London, documenting the 1965 International Poetry Incarnation
- Silence = Death, 1989 documentary about gay artists, AIDS activism, and HIV/AIDS education in New York City.
- The Life and Times of Allen Ginsberg
- Howl (potrayed by James Franco)

== See also ==
- Allen Ginsberg Live in London
- American poetry
- Burroughs by Howard Brookner
- Central Park Be-In
- Counterculture of the 1960s
- Howl (2010 film)
- Hungry generation
- Jewish Buddhist
- Kill Your Darlings
- LGBTQ culture in New York City
- List of LGBT people from New York City
- List of peace activists
- The Life and Times of Allen Ginsberg (film)
- Trevor Carolan

== Sources ==
- Bromley, David G.; Shinn, Larry D. (1989). Krishna consciousness in the West. Bucknell University Press. ISBN 978-0-8387-5144-2.
- Brooks, Charles R. (1992). The Hare Krishnas in India (1st ed.). Motilal Banarsidass Publishers. ISBN 978-81-208-0939-0.
- Chryssides, George D.; Wilkins, Margaret Z. (2006). A reader in new religious movements. Continuum International Publishing Group. ISBN 978-0-8264-6168-1.
- Cohen, Allen (1991). Allen Cohen (ed.). The San Francisco Oracle. The psychedelic newspaper of the Haight-Ashbury (1966–1968). Facsimile edition (1st ed.). Regent Press. ISBN 978-0-916147-11-2.
- Miles, Barry (2001). Ginsberg: A Biography. London: Virgin Publishing. ISBN 978-0-7535-0486-4.
- Morgan, Bill (2007). I Celebrate Myself: The Somewhat Private Life of Allen Ginsberg. New York: Penguin. ISBN 978-0-14-311249-5.
- Ginsberg, Allen; Morgan, Bill (1986). Kanreki: a tribute to Allen Ginsberg, Part 2. University of California.
- Goswami, Mukunda (2011). Miracle on Second Avenue. Torchlight Publishing. ISBN 978-0-9817273-4-9.
- Greene, Joshua M. (2007). Here somes the Sun: The spiritual and musical journey of George Harrison (reprint ed.). John Wiley and Sons. ISBN 978-0-470-12780-3.
- Muster, Nori Jean (1997). Betrayal of the spirit: my life behind the headlines of the Hare Krishna movement (reprint ed.). University of Illinois Press. ISBN 978-0-252-06566-8.
- Raskin, Jonah (2004). American Scream: Allen Ginsberg's Howl and the Making of the Beat Generation. Berkeley: University of California Press. ISBN 0-520-24015-4.
- Schumacher, Michael (ed.). Family Business: Selected Letters Between a Father and Son. Bloomsbury (2002), paperback, 448 pages, ISBN 1-58234-216-4
- Szatmary, David P. (1996). Rockin' in time: a social history of rock-and-roll (3rd ed.). Prentice Hall. ISBN 978-0-13-440678-7.
