= Allen Ginsberg Live in London =

2005 film

- Release date: 2005
- Country: United Kingdom

Allen Ginsberg Live in London is a DVD film of Allen Ginsberg reading his poetry, singing songs and performing a Tibetan meditation live on stage in London on Thursday 19 October 1995, at Megatripolis club-night at Heaven nightclub, London.

Filmed and edited by Steve Teers, of Diva Pictures, the film was recorded as part of an archive record for 'megatripolis', the underground psychedelic club-night which ran at Heaven nightclub from 1993 to 1996. The DVD sees Ginsberg reading a selection of his work from the 1970s White Shroud Poems era to 80's Cosmopolitan Greetings and 90's new and unpublished poems. Ginsberg was on stage for almost an hour, performing under theatrical lighting in front of about 1000 people. Dressed in blue shirt, red braces and slacks, Ginsberg was reading on stage at a single microphone with assistance from poet Tom Pickard for the duration of the performance, also occasionally playing harmonium. He was initially introduced by Lee Harris who had also booked him for the event. Ginsberg performed William Blake accompanying himself on the harmonium as a singalong finale.

This was Ginsberg's last public stage appearance in the United Kingdom.

The film premiered in Covent Garden, London in June 2005, and was later released on DVD, officially released with the permission of The Wylie Agency (UK) Ltd.

The film has been shown at numerous arts festivals. It was shown at a 50th anniversary celebration of "Howl", Ginsberg's iconic protest poem on 1 November 2006 in Bloomsbury, London, where live readings from Adrian Mitchell, Michael Horovitz and Aidan Dun also took place along with a screening of Wholly Communion, Peter Whitehead's famous film of the 1965 Royal Albert Hall poet meet.

The DVD film was released initially through major stores and remains available on its website. It is an archive film and thus reflects the sound and picture quality of archive film footage.
