= RESIST (non-profit) =

RESIST is a philanthropic non-profit organization based out of Boston, Massachusetts. It has provided grants to grassroots activist organizations around the country since its inception in 1967 as a result of the anti-war proclamation "A Call to Resist Illegitimate Authority".

== History ==
RESIST formed in 1966 as an intellectual collective in response to the growing unrest surrounding the Vietnam War. First taking shape in the period leading up to the 1967 March on the Pentagon, Robert Barsky describes the collective's formation in Noam Chomsky: A Life of Dissent:

in recognition of his friend's long experience with activism, Paul Lauter asked Chomsky ... to team up with him and others to support draft resistance. It was 1966. This was one factor leading to the formation of Resist, which, Chomsky remembers, "'very quickly became involved in other forms of resistance to illegitimate authority" (31 Mar. 1995). One of the activities in which Resist became involved was the March on the Pentagon.

In addition to Chomsky and Lauter, others involved in the organization's early stages included novelist Mitchell Goodman, novelist Hans Koning, poet Robert Lowell, writer Dwight Macdonald, leading lawyer for the Mobilization's Legal Defense Committee Ed de Grazia, poet Denise Levertov, and The Armies of the Night author Norman Mailer.

In the days leading up to the march, the collective penned "A Call to Resist Illegitimate Authority," which was published in the October 12th, 1967 edition of The New York Review of Books. The manifesto was signed by hundreds including Mitchell Goodman, Marcus Raskin Henry Braun, Denise Levertov, Noam Chomsky, William Sloane Coffin, Norman Mailer, Robert Lowell, Dwight Macdonald, Allen Ginsberg, Barbara Guest, Wilbur H. Ferry, and Lawrence Ferlinghetti. Leaflets were circulated among sympathizers prior to the march detailing their intended action:

WE ARE PLANNING AN ACT OF DIRECT CREATIVE RESISTANCE TO THE WAR AND THE DRAFT IN WASHINGTON ON FRIDAY, OCTOBER 20. The locale of our action will be the Department of Justice. We will gather at the First United Congregational Church of Christ, 10th and G Streets, N.W., Washington ... at 1 P.M. We will appear at the Justice Department together with 30 or 40 young men brought by us to Washington to represent the 24 Resistance groups from all over the country. There we will present to the Attorney General the draft cards turned in locally by these groups on October 16 ... We will, in a clear, simple ceremony, make concrete our affirmation of support for these young men who are the spearhead of direct resistance to the war and all of its machinery. ...

[Signed] Mitchell Goodman, Henry Braun, Denise Levertov, [Noam Chomsky, William Sloane Coffin, Dwight Macdonald.

NOTE: Among the hundreds already committed to this action are Robert Lowell, Norman Mailer, Ashley Montagu, Arthur Waskow, and professors from most of the major colleges and universities in the East.

The March was met with police aggression, resulting in the arrests of Mailer, Chomsky, Dave Dellinger, and Dagmar Wilson.

=== The Boston Five ===
The publishing of "A Call to Resist Illegitimate Authority" led to the arrest of five of its signers, known as the Boston Five, in early 1968. These were Michael Ferber, Dr. Benjamin Spock, William Sloan Coffin, Mitchell Goodman, and Marcus Raskin. All five were members of RESIST. The indictment came on counts of "conspiring to 'counsel, aid, and abet' young men to refuse service in the armed forces and to refuse to have in their possession registration certificates and notices of classification." The claims were met with opposition from anti-war sympathizers, including the some odd 200 members of RESIST. The organization's associate national director and professor of Humanities at M.I.T. Louis Kampf held a press conference to address the organization's response to the indictments. He stated that Resist was considering calling a national academic strike, and that a statement in support of the Five was gathering signatures. The Rev. Martin Luther King Jr. was among the first to sign, "declaring that he too should go to jail if the five under indictment are sentenced." As reported in The Harvard Crimson:

According to the indictment, Coffin, Goodman, Raskin, and Dr. Spock agreed to sponsor a nationwide draft-resistance program [RESIST] that would include disrupting the induction processes at various induction centers, making public appeals for young men to resist the draft and to refuse to serve in the military services, and issuing calls for registrants to turn in their draft cards ... Another "overt act" of the alleged conspiracy is the distribution in New York last August by Coffin and Dr. Spock of a statement entitled "A Call to Resist Illegitimate Authority."

The Boston Five were convicted of conspiracy in the courtroom of Francis Ford.

=== COINTELPRO ===
In the late 1960s and early 1970s RESIST received information from an underground group called "The Citizen's Commission to Investigate the FBI" regarding surveillance of various citizens and groups. The documents included "manuals and routine forms, 25 per cent concern bank robberies, 20 per cent murder, rape, and interstate theft, 7 per cent draft resistance, 7 per cent AWOL soldiers and 1 per cent organized crime, including gambling". In addition to these, intelligence was gathered about groups such as the Ku Klux Klan and the Jewish Defense League. These documents were part of a larger FBI initiative called COINTELPRO; an acronym for COunter INTELligence PROgram. The program "was a secret FBI program designed to monitor and "neutralize" domestic groups deemed by the FBI to be a danger to national security. Such groups included anti-war groups and civil rights groups and individuals like Martin Luther King Jr. and even Eleanor Roosevelt" RESIST was the first to release leaked information surrounding the covert initiative, leading to the formation of the Church Committee: an investigative senatorial committee whose purpose was to flesh out the true story behind the allegations. The allegations brought to light by RESIST turned out to be entirely correct, leading to the cessation of the program.

== Today ==
RESIST has moved away from its front lines activist roots and now seeks to fund those that continue that work. In 2014, the organization gave 146 grants to grassroots activist organizations around the country, thanks to the help of over 7,000 donors, contributing an average gift of $129.00. Resist has broadened in scope since its inception to include issues of environmentalism, the rights of women, prisoners, undocumented immigrants, the LGBTQ community, and worker's rights, among others. The organization continues to work to support the groups that are chopping down the pillars that prop up everything from militarism to capitalism, from racism to patriarchy, and the intersections that connect them all. There is a long list of organizations that have benefited from its efforts, including grantees such as:

- Global Exchange
- Black Panther Party
- Central Committee for Conscientious Objectors
- Students for a Democratic Society
- Third World Newsreel
- 9to5
- American Indian Movement
- Clamshell Alliance
- Gay Liberation Front
- Southern Student Organizing Committee
- United Farm Workers
- Vietnam Veterans Against the War
- ACT-UP
- Center for Constitutional Rights
- Committee in Solidarity with the People of El Salvador
- Women's International League for Peace and Freedom
- Black Radical Congress
- Jobs with Justice
- NARAL Pro-Choice America
- School of the Americas Watch
- Center for Artistic Revolution
- Coalition Against Militarism in Our Schools
- Critical Resistance
- Prometheus Radio Project

== See also ==
- List of anti-war organizations
