= Fulcrum Press =

UK publisher of poetry mid-1960s - 1970s

Fulcrum Press (1965 – 1974) was founded in London in the mid-1960s by medical student Stuart Montgomery (born 1938, in Rhodesia) and his wife Deirdre. Montgomery later became an eminent psychiatrist and expert in depression. Earning a reputation as the premier small press of the late 1960s to early '70s, Fulcrum published major American and British poets in the modernist and the avant-garde traditions in carefully designed books on good paper. The Fulcrum Press made a significant contribution to the British Poetry Revival and was one of the best known little presses of the period, recognized for publishing the works of Modernist poets including Ezra Pound, Basil Bunting, Allen Ginsberg and Roy Fisher.

Montgomery published Basil Bunting's Loquitur (1965), First Book of Odes (1965), Ode II/2 (1965), his landmark Briggflatts: An Autobiography (1966) and the same poet's Collected Poems (1968). It produced about forty books by more than twenty poets, including Pete Brown, Ed Dorn (Gunslinger 1 & 2, 1970), Robert Duncan, Larry Eigner, Paul Evans, Roy Fisher, Ian Hamilton Finlay, Donald Gardner (born 1938, For the flames, 1974), Allen Ginsberg, Michael Hamburger, Lee Harwood, Spike Hawkins, Alan Jackson, David Jones, Christopher Middleton, Lorine Niedecker, Jeff Nuttall, George Oppen, Tom Pickard (with a preface by Bunting), Omar S. Pound, F. T. Prince, Tom Raworth, Jerome Rothenberg and Gary Snyder. Stuart Montgomery published two books of his own poems, Circe (1969) and Shabby Sunshine (1973), and his medical study Measures of Depression (1978).

Fulcrum Press had much of their printing done by Villiers Press in London, which in the words of Alastair Johnston "was serviceable though typographically uninspired (like the City Lights books they also printed)....However, Montgomery frequently had exceptional cover art from Tom Phillips, Barnett Newman, Patrick Caulfield, Ian Dury, Ron Kitaj or Richard Hamilton."

The demise of Fulcrum came about as the consequence of a lengthy legal dispute with Scottish poet Ian Hamilton Finlay over the mistaken description of his collection The Dancers Inherit the Party as a first edition when it was published by Montgomery, who was unable to meet the costs of losing the case.

When Fulcrum Press folded in the 1970s most of the stock was pulped.
