= Trevor Carolan =

Canadian writer

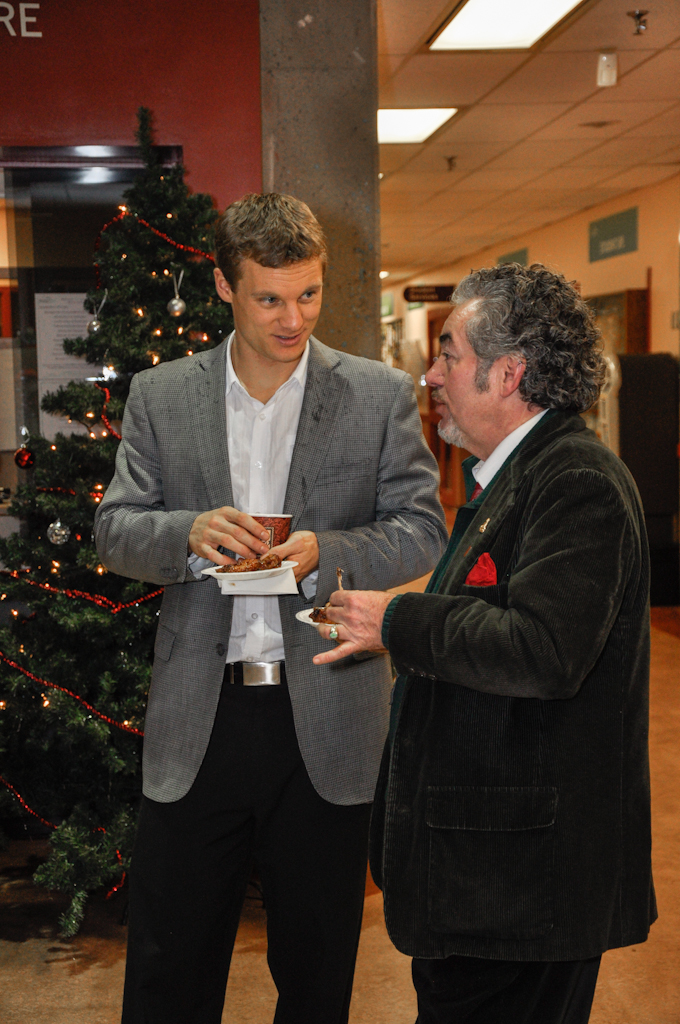
- Born: 1951 (age 74–75); Bradford, Yorkshire
- Occupations: Writer, Editor, Journalist
- Known for: East-west studies, Native American rights, Asia, Poetry, Creative Writing
- Website: trevorcarolan.com

Trevor Carolan (born 1951) is a Canadian writer. He has published 20 books of non-fiction, poetry, fiction, translations and anthologies.

== Early life ==
Born in Bradford, Yorkshire, Carolan's family emigrated in 1957 and he grew up in New Westminster near Vancouver, British Columbia. His stonemason father also ran a folk music-era coffeehouse and he grew up interested in music and art. He has noted his luck as a high-school student there in having veteran Canadian writer Sam Roddan as a teacher. Roddan inspired him to write and had Carolan's early poetry featured on CBC Radio. At age 17 he also began writing for The Columbian newspaper and contributed articles on San Francisco's Haight-Ashbury music scene where his first introductions were to Bill Graham of the Fillmore West and singer Janis Joplin. He subsequently traveled extensively in Europe and Asia. During the winter of 1970, Carolan spent time living at the studio home of visual artist Marcos Irrizarry and Abel Bello in Pozuelo d'Alarcon near Madrid, and he credits the experience for showing him the possibilities of a life in the arts.

== Education ==
Returned to B.C., Carolan played harmonica in folk-blues units while studying at Douglas College and Simon Fraser University, where he studied theatre with Richard Ouzounian. His interest in writing grew and led him to Eureka, California where he studied Creative Writing with Jim Dodge while completing his B.A. and M.A.in English at Humboldt State University in Arcata. In 1978, he met poet Allen Ginsberg who encouraged him to continue writing poetry. Back in Vancouver, he began writing for the Georgia Straight, joined P.W.A.C., and as a freelance journalist wrote for publications throughout Canada and the U.S. Following a lengthy journey through Asia in 1985 he increasingly specialized in east–west arts and letters and his three anthologies of East, Southeast and South Asian short stories have been influential in bringing attention in English to contemporary literature from these regions (see The Colors of Heaven: Short Stories From the Pacific Rim (Vintage-Random House, 1992; Another Kind of Paradise: Short Stories from the New Asia-Pacific [Cheng & Tsui, 2010]; and The Lotus Singers: Stories from Contemporary South Asia [Cheng & Tsui, 2011]).

== Career ==
Carolan has interwoven writing, teaching and arts administrative appointments throughout his career. He served as first executive director of the Federation of B.C. Writers in the early Eighties, was Literary Coordinator for the XVth Olympic Winter Games Festival of the Arts in Calgary (1986–88), and Coordinator of Literary Arts at the Banff Centre in 2006. His publications include co-translations of the modern Taoist classics The Book of the Heart and The Supreme Way; Giving Up Poetry, a memoir of his studies with Allen Ginsberg; and the critically acclaimed Return To Stillness: Twenty Years With A Tai Chi Master.

He has also worked as media advocate on behalf of international human rights, Canadian Aboriginal land claims, famine relief, and Pacific Coast logging and watershed issues. He holds an interdisciplinary Ph.D. from Bond University in Australia, and since 2001 has taught English and Creative Writing at University of the Fraser Valley in Abbotsford, B.C. The International Editor for The Pacific Rim Review of Books, he is a regular contributor for Choice, The Bloomsbury Review, Manoa, Kyoto Journal and Shambhala Sun. Carolan's novel The Pillow Book of Dr. Jazz is published internationally by Ekstasis Editions. He lives in North Vancouver, Canada, where he served for three years as an elected municipal councillor.

== Bibliography ==
=== Fiction ===
- The Pillow Book of Dr. Jazz: Travels Along Asia's Dharma Trail, Anchor, Sydney, 1999
- Big Whiskers Saves The Cove, Concorde, Vancouver, 1995 (children's environmental mystery)

=== Non-Fiction ===
- Return to Stillness: Twenty Years with a Tai Chi Master, Marlowe & Co., 2003
- Giving up Poetry: With Allen Ginsberg At Hollyhock, Banff Centre Press, 2001
- New World Dharma: Interviews and Encounters With Buddhist Teachers, Writers, and Leaders, State University of New York Press, 2016

=== Poetry ===
- Celtic Highway: Poems & Texts, Ekstasis, 2002
- Closing The Circle, Heron Press; Vancouver, 1985

=== Anthologies (as editor) ===
- Cascadia: The Life and Breath of the World, Mānoa Journal/University of Hawaii Press, 2013
- The Lotus Singers: Contemporary Stories from South Asia, Editor Cheng & Tsui, 2011
- Making Waves: Reading B.C. and Pacific Northwest Literature, Editor Anvil Press, 2010
- Along the Rim: The Best of Pacific Rim Review of Books, Vol. II. Co-ed. Ekstasis, 2010
- Another Kind of Paradise: Short Stories from the New Asia-Pacific, editor Cheng & Tsui, 2009
- Against the Shore: The Best of Pacific Rim Review of Books, Co-ed, Ekstasis, 2008
- Down In The Valley: Contemporary Writing from B.C.'s Fraser Valley, Editor, Ekstasis, 2004
- The Colours of Heaven: Short Stories From The Pacific Rim, editor, Vintage, N.Y. 1992.

=== Translation ===
- The Supreme Way: Inner Teachings of the Southern Mountain Tao, (co-translation with Du Liang), North Atlantic, Berkeley, 1997
- The Book of the Heart: Embracing the Tao(with Bella Chen), Shambhala Pub. 1990; Heron Press, Vancouver, 1988
