= Deliberate Prose =

Book by Allen Ginsberg

- Author: Allen Ginsberg
- Publication date: 2001
- ISBN: 978-0-06-093081-3

Deliberate Prose - Essays 1952 to 1995 is a collection of essays penned by Allen Ginsberg in the years 1952 to 1995. The writer and poet was consistently outspoken and passionate about his beliefs. The essays are arranged by subject and include commentary on such themes as China, Vietnam, and the 1968 Democratic National Convention in Chicago.
