= Catfish McDaris =

American poet and author (born 1953)

Steven "Catfish" McDaris (born 1953) is an American poet and author who is often associated with Allen Ginsberg. He is also notable for having collaborated with Charles Bukowski.

== Biography ==
McDaris was born in Albuquerque, New Mexico in 1953.

After 3 years serving in the military as a young man, he hopped freights and hitchhiked across the U.S. and Mexico. He built adobe houses, tamed wild horses, made cattle troughs, worked in a zinc smelter, and painted flag poles.

For a time, he lived in a cave and wintered in a Chevy in Denver.

He eventually settled in Milwaukee, Wisconsin where he worked for the United States Postal Service.

In 1994, he organized a charity event of poetry and music in Milwaukee, called Wordstock. During the same year, he also read at The First Underground Press Conference at De Paul University in Chicago.

In 1998, he read at a Beatnik festival held near Allen Ginsberg's farm,

In 2007, he read at Shakespeare & Co. Bookstore in Paris.

== Reception and influence ==
McDaris has published extensively in the small press and independent magazines. He is also often associated with Allen Ginsberg and collaborated with Charles Bukowski on a chapbook called 'Prying'. In addition, his work has appeared in such publications as The Penny Dreadful Review, Chiron Review, the Shepherd Express and Blink-Ink Marquette University holds his collected published works and personal papers in their special collections archives.

== Awards and nominations ==
- 1999 The Uprising Award.
- 2010 The Flash Fiction Award at Gypsy, as judged by U.S. Poet Laureate.
- 2015 The Thelonious Monk Award at

== Publications ==
- Van Gogh's Ear-Skinner's, Irregular Horse, 1994
- The Moon Gets Laid Skinner's, Irregular Horse, 1994
- Pyramids On Mars, KPG Press, 1994,
- Iguana In Your Pocket (with Nathan Beaty), Green Eggs & Ham Press, 1995
- Drowning In Your Bloodshot Eyes (with Jim Buchanan), Angelflesh Press, 1995
- Catfish In The Pecos, Angelflesh Press, 1996
- Magic Buffalo by The Peyote Brothers (with elliott), Angelflesh Press, 1997
- Prying (with Charles Bukowski and Jack Micheline), Four-Sep Publications, 1997
- Funk/Works (with Mark Sonnenfeld), Marymark Press, 1998
- And The Horse You Rode In On, Born Again(st)Christian Press, 1998
- The Wolf Pack (with Mark Wisniewski and Wolf Vest), Pariah Press, 1999
- Bitchslapped (art by Swanky Mike Tolento), A Pick Pocket Book published by Phony Lid Books, 2002
- Maow-Miaou-Editions, Microbe(French/English), 2000
- Tears from Nowhere, Spunk, 2001
- Coyoacan, JVC Books, 2001
- A Field Of Dancing Horses, fingerprint press, 2004
- Making Love To The Rain, Propaganda Press, 2010
- Dancing Naked On Bukowski's Grave, Horror, Sleaze, Trash Press (with Ben John Smith) ISBN 978-1-4477-6940-8, 2011
- Tales From A French Envelope, (with Craig Scott) Ten Pages Press ISBN 978-1-257-96373-7, 2011
- Naked Fly Cherry Marijuana, Graffiti Kolkata (India), 2012
- Waiting On Nothing, Mad Rush Books ISBN 978-1-105-70938-8, 2012
- Jupiter Orgasma, Mad Rush Books ISBN 978-1-300-70644-1, 2013 Hard Cover
- Thieves of the Wind (with Subhankar Das) ISBN 978-1-49967-033-2 Writing Knights Press, 2014
- Cannibal Sunflowers ISBN 978-1-50033-001-9 Writing Knights Press, 2014
- McDaris, Catfish, ed. (May 9, 2017). Resurrection of a Sunflower. Pski's Porch. ISBN 978-0-9988476-0-3. — including 10 pages by McDaris
- Dreaming With Frida Kahlo ISBN 9781980293804 200 pages
- Magic Coyote Rain Dance 24 pages
- The Ass Of The Statue Of Liberty 24 pages
- Blue Throat Of Day ISBN 9781946642899 170 pages
- Ghosts of the War Elephants ISBN 9780578541440 144 pages
- Rock ‘N’ Roll Poetry Poesie Rock “N’ Roll

joint French/English mini-Chap with Eric Dejaeger

- Talking Shit and Doing the Funky Chicken with John D Robinson
- Meat Grinder with Donald Armfield ISBN 9798612766599 147 pages
- Buffalo Nickels, Grandma Moses Press, 2014
- Switcheroo (with David Mac) Mac Press in England, 2014
- Day 4 (with Alexis Rhone Fancher, John Swain, & Bree) ISBN 978-1-50098-516-5 Green Panda Press 2014
- 66 lines On Your Soul (with Subhankar Das & Kevin Ridgeway) Graffiti Kolkata India 2014
- Naked Serial Killers In Volkswagens Weekly Weird Monthly, Austin, Texas 2015
- No Blindfold No Cigarette Black Dharma Press Dynatox Ministries, NJ 2015
- Sleeping With the Fish Pski's Porch Lockport, NY ISBN 978-0692671320

ψ 27 Hammerheads Circling Ever Closer ISBN 9780997870688 315 pages
