= Subhankar Das =

Subhankar Das (13 March 1963 – 22 May 2024) was an Indian poet, bookshop owner, actor and film producer.

== Biography ==
His first book of poems, "Songs of the Damaged Brain", was published in 1987. Subhankar was an advocate and activist of the independent and underground voice in Bangla literature. He was the founder of Graffiti Kolkata, publisher of chapbooks, as well as home of the Graffiti Kolkata Broadside, an indie lit publication that has hosted numerous independent writers and artists. Das has written a total of twenty-four collections of poetry in Bangla. His most recent collection, 'Thieves of the Wind' (with Catfish McDaris appears in English. In addition, his work has appeared in such publications as Blink-Ink

== Poetry ==
(in Bangla and in English)

- By the Banks of the Ajoy, Jaideb Vanishes into the Blue ISBN 978-110534-133-5 Virgogray Press, 2011

(in English)

- Thieves of the Wind (with Catfish McDaris) ISBN 978-1-49967-033-2 Writing Knights Press, 2014
- 66 lines On Your Soul (with Catfish McDaris & Kevin Ridgeway) Graffiti Kolkata India 2014
- Bukowski Smoked Bidis Grandma Moses Press, 2015

== Film ==
- Birth of a Pillow
