= The Life and Times of Allen Ginsberg =

1993 film by Jerry Aronson

The Life and Times of Allen Ginsberg is a 1993 film by Jerry Aronson chronicling the poet Allen Ginsberg's life up to that point, along with his views on death; Ginsberg was in his mid 60s when the movie was first released, and died at age 70. The film has been completed and released a number of times due to changing technologies and world events. The first release of the film was in 1993 at the Sundance Film Festival after which it enjoyed an international festival run and USA theatrical run. When Aronson showed him the film the poet is reported to have nodded his head thoughtfully and said, "So, that's Allen Ginsberg."

After Ginsberg passed in 1997, Jerry Aronson decided to update the ending of the film to include the poet's passing, added a shot of Ginsberg's headstone in New Jersey, and added a new recording of Paul Simon singing Ginsberg's "New Stanzas for Amazing Grace" for the closing credits.

The new DVD, released in July 2007 by New Yorker Video, includes interviews with Bono, Paul McCartney, Yoko Ono, Johnny Depp, Hunter S. Thompson, Andy Warhol, Patti Smith, Joan Baez, Michael McClure, Norman Mailer, Amiri Baraka, Ken Kesey, William S. Burroughs, Anne Waldman and Timothy Leary - all of whom considered Ginsberg a good friend.

In addition to the documentary, the DVD release contains a number of bonus features. These include behind-the-scenes footage with Paul McCartney, Bob Dylan, and Neal Cassady; excerpts from a Ginsberg memorial; and extended and updated interviews.
