= Diving into the Wreck: Poems 1971–1972 =

1973 poetry book by Adrienne Rich

Diving into the Wreck: Poems 1971–1972 is an anthology of poems written by Adrienne Rich. Published in 1973, it won the National Book Award for Poetry in 1974.

== Description ==
Diving into the Wreck: Poems 1971–1972 is Rich's seventh book of poetry, first published in 1973. It is a collection of exploratory and often angry poems, split the 1974 National Book Award for Poetry with Allen Ginsberg, The Fall of America. Rich declined to accept the award individually and was joined by the two other feminist poets nominated—Alice Walker and Audre Lorde—to accept it on behalf of all women "whose voices have gone and still go unheard in a patriarchal world."

The anthology consists of twenty-five poems separated into four sections including the poem 'Diving into the Wreck' after which the collection is titled. Like much of Rich’s work, the anthology contains deep political themes and critiques of society, reflecting the poet’s position as a feminist and activist.

== Poems ==
=== "Diving into the Wreck" ===
We are, I am, you are
by cowardice or courage
the one who find our way
back to this scene
carrying a knife, a camera
a book of myths
in which
our names do not appear.

— From "Diving into the Wreck"
Diving into the Wreck: Poems 1971–1972 (1973)

The eponymous metaphorical poem describes a deep-sea diver before and during the exploration of a shipwreck.

“Diving into the Wreck” is one of the most famous poems of the anthology. The symbols of the wreckage and the diver bravely entering an unknown world have been examined in relation to existentialism, post-structuralism and feminism.

The diver’s act of exploration and discovery within the wreck is linked to scholarly and literary ideas of the ‘new self’. It is used as a metaphor for self-discovery and the internal and spiritual journey that individuals must undertake in order to understand themselves and their place in the world.

Unsurprisingly considering Rich’s stance as a feminist, “Diving into the Wreck” became an important part of feminist literature. The so-called ‘book of myths’ referred to in the first line of the poem and again in the closing lines is described as a symbol of or reference to “patriarchal society” and “the myth making that has ruined lives of women”. The speaker’s entry into the water and the wreck is not only part of a journey of self-discovery but also represents how women can reclaim their freedom amid the wreckage of the history and identities of forgotten women. These acts of exploration, courage and reclamation link to Rich’s own reclamation of women’s spaces in the literary sphere and the absence or romanticization of the female body and mind in literature and historical records.

Some scholars interpret the diver as being male, or at least as a figure who emulates the behaviors and traits of the typical, solitary male hero found in literature, seeking domination over nature through the use of the mask which supports the diver’s exploration. By the end of the poem, ambiguity arises amid an emergence of both masculinity and femininity resulting in the androgynous figure of the diver. Rich suggests the acceptance of both traits or, taking it a step further, the deconstruction of both as myths to be shrugged off in favor of androgyny.

The water itself is another metaphor – representing knowledge and memory, acting as a separate space detached from the familiar world where intense change and evolution is facilitated. It is a large, intimidating space into which the diver enters willingly. The diver’s use of equipment, including a suitable outfit, enables them to safely search for the desired knowledge.

Rich suffered from mobility issues, had to attend physical therapy and developed a fear of going down staircases. It is worth noting her use of a ladder for descending into the water, how uncomfortable that may have been for her, and her descriptions of the movement-restricting gear the diver wears and how they have to learn to move in the environment, which may also be related to her lived experiences.

“Diving into the Wreck” has also been associated with Rich’s time at the City College of New York where she taught literature to black students within the Search for Education, Elevation, and Knowledge program. It was during this time that Rich was working on the anthology. Rich was vocal about the lack of black women in academic settings and her deconstruction of myths and history, skewed in favor of the oppressors, has a meaning that can be appreciated from a multitude of angles.

=== "Song" ===
“Song” is a poem that describes the loneliness of the speaker while also including journeying and exploration. The speaker compares their feelings of loneliness to a plane and a woman travelling by car. This woman notes the places she may have stopped and lived in and how that too would have been lonely. The woman could have become a housewife but chooses solitary life on the road. Within “Song” Rich reframes loneliness and suggests that it may be better to explore and stand alone, rather than be confined.

=== "Rape" ===
"Rape" is a poem that describes the plight of a woman who has been raped, forced to seek justice from a callous and patronizing male-dominated world. As in many of Rich's poems, "Rape" highlights the struggle of women against sexism and its sometimes cruel consequences, and can be seen as an effort to call women to action. "Rape" was published in 1973 in Diving into the Wreck: Poems 1971-1972.

== Critical response ==
The anthology was met upon release, and in the years since, with mixed reviews; at the time, it was Rich’s most largely read work.

After its initial release, the content was criticized and judged to be poorly written; the political nature of her work was deemed to have diminished Rich’s creative skills. In one newspaper, The Hudson Review, William Pritchard was particularly critical of “Rape” which he dismissed as propaganda. Within his review, he states that a requirement of poetry is that it please the reader, which Rich did not do.

However, it has also been highly praised by important literary figures, such as Margaret Atwood, who reviewed the anthology after hearing Rich reading from it and then went on to read all the poems herself. She describes the anthology as an “extraordinary one”. Atwood praises Rich’s work for its intense emotional impact and skillfully used metaphors, stating that “you feel about her best images, her best myths, that nobody else writes quite like this.”

In the book The aesthetics of power: the poetry of Adrienne Rich by Claire Keyes, Rich is described as expressing radical and extremist views in the Diving into the Wreck anthology. While Keyes offers some praise, she also suggests that Rich’s ideas and work were not, at the time, fully fledged. She questions why Rich switches between an admiration of androgyny, combining masculinity with femininity and a strong disapproval and deconstruction of masculinity. In her idealization of androgyny in some poems such as “Diving into the Wreck”, according to Keyes, Rich forsakes her stance on womanhood and the rejection of masculinity, with Keyes stating that this “makes for a problematic volume of poetry that is clearly transitional”. Meanwhile, other writers disagree and praise Rich’s focus on androgyny, writing that in “Diving into the Wreck” she “scissored men out of the picture.”

== How her life affected her poetry ==
Rich’s change in her poetry was summed up by Carol Muske-Dukes in the ‘New York Times Book Review’ that Rich began as a ‘wife and mother’ then as she ‘progressed in life’ went from having a husband to being a ‘young widow’ and that ultimately pushed her conversion towards being ‘a feminist leader’ but also a respected figure of the ‘newly-defined female literature’.

Rich had always explored issues surrounding identity, sexuality and politics, she aims to reach social justice not only for women but also in her role in the anti-war movement. This is clear in poems such as ‘What Kind of Times Are These’ (1991) in which contains the lines ‘our country moving closer to its own truth and dread, its own ways of making people disappear.’

Her stances in her life weave through her poetry and connect it all together and link it back to her. She takes inspiration from who she is as a person to help create ideas and write her poems. Some deemed as commentary and some as warnings against what the world will become without the social justice she fought for in her life.

== Feminism ==
Adrienne Rich was originally known through her earlier work, including her work of ‘A Change of World’ (1951), as very prestigious as she won the Yale Younger Poets Award. However, as time passed to the late 1960s and 1970s she shifted to a more radical stance with her poetry becoming free-verse and filled with feminist and political content.

A key moment in Adrienne Rich’s life was in 1974 where she won The National Book Award, however, she didn’t just take the award for herself she shared it with two other women, Audre Lorde and Alice Walker, on behalf of all women. Adrienne wished to share a woman’s accomplishment with all women.

A woman named Polly Heins said in her essay on ‘Adrienne Rich:"Re-membering" Women's History and Language’ (page 7) said that ‘Her poetic concerns echo her personal growth and the development of her awareness as a woman in a male-controlled society.’ Commenting on how Rich wrote about how she felt controlled within society due to being a woman.

Adrienne often wrote about poetry that explores the autonomy of women, the confinements of domestic life on women and the oppression of women in the patriarchal society she lived in. A poem this links with is ‘Diving into the Wreck’ in which holds themes of rejecting the patriarchal myths as the speaker has ‘a book of myths’ on which ‘our names do not appear’. The poem also holds the idea of both genders being equal as the speaker says ‘I am she: I am he’, as Rich places both genders on the same level as each other.

== Links across her poems, essays and books ==
This link of feminism is shown through many of her other poems, two examples ‘Aunt Jennifer’s Tigers’ (1951) and ‘’Snapshots of a Daughter-in-Law’ (1963). With links of feminism and being removed from any sort of freedom continues.

In ‘Aunt Jennifer’s Tigers’ the key theme of feminism is split to the internal themes of the mental suppression of women in traditional marriages seen through the last stanza

‘When Aunt is dead, her terrified hands will lie

Still ringed with ordeals she was mastered by.

The tigers in the panel that she made

Will go on prancing, proud and unafraid.’

Which comments on how despite the embroidered tigers’ freedom Aunt Jennifer is locked under the social weight of her marriage to her husband. Linking back to the idea that women are trapped in the confinements of domestic life.

Rich often uses harsh terminology to portray the struggles of women in her poetry and books, an example being ‘Snapshots of a Daughter-in-Law’ (1963) in which she uses words like ‘scorch marks’ and ‘kettles’ which have both a domestic image but also a dangerous image. Implying how easy it is for a woman in married life to turn from domestic bliss to being in danger. Within the same book her lines are viewed by many as fractured and uneven, which Rich could have used to portray the breaking of women and their identities within a patriarchal marriage. Linking back to 'Diving into the Wreck' where she places both men and women on equal terms.

Adrinne Rich once said, in her essay collection ‘On Lies, Secrets and Silence’, “The connections between and among women are the most feared, the most problematic, and the most potentially transforming force on the planet.” Highlighting her view on the fact the women have the power to come together and build up each other whilst changing the world and its rules.
