= International Poetry Incarnation =

The International Poetry Incarnation was an event at the Royal Albert Hall in London on 11 June 1965.

== Background ==
In May 1965, Allen Ginsberg arrived at Better Books, an independent bookstore in London's Charing Cross Road, and offered to read anywhere for free.

Shortly after his arrival, he gave a reading at Better Books, which was described by Jeff Nuttall as "the first healing wind on a very parched collective mind". Tom McGrath wrote: "This could well turn out to have been a very significant moment in the history of England - or at least in the history of English Poetry."

Shortly after Ginsberg's reading at Better Books, plans were hatched for the International Poetry Incarnation.

== The event ==
The event, organized by the filmmaker Barbara Rubin, attracted an audience of 7,000 people (including Indira Gandhi) to readings and other live and tape performances by a variety of artists (mostly poets; all male) from several countries.

Performers:

- Pete Brown
- William S. Burroughs
- Gregory Corso
- John Esam
- Harry Fainlight
- Lawrence Ferlinghetti
- Pablo Fernández
- Allen Ginsberg
- Spike Hawkins
- Anselm Hollo
- Michael Horovitz
- Ernst Jandl
- Paolo Lionni (1938 - 1985)
- Christopher Logue
- George MacBeth
- Tom McGrath
- Adrian Mitchell
- Dan Richter
- Alexander Trocchi
- Simon Vinkenoog
- Andrei Voznesensky

Chilean poet Pablo Neruda was also booked for the event but had to cancel.

The event was formative for what became the UK underground over the subsequent years. Jeff Nuttall, author of Bomb Culture, said "the Underground was suddenly there on the surface". Barry Miles described "a sense of constituency that was never there before.... All these people recognised each other and they all realised they were part of the same scene."

== Coverage in other media ==
Peter Whitehead documented the event on film and released it as Wholly Communion.

Horovitz's related anthology Children of Albion: Poetry of the Underground in Britain was published by Penguin in 1969.
