= Jim Cohn =

American poet

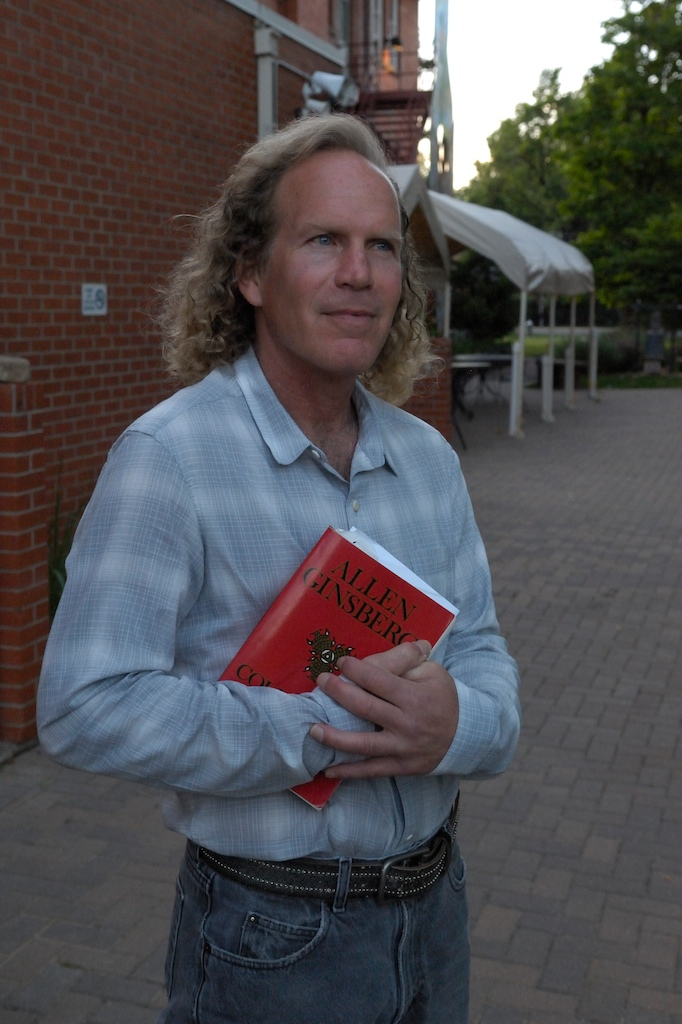
Jim Cohn

Jim Cohn is a poet, poetry activist, and spoken word artist in the United States.

== Early life and education ==
Cohn was born in Highland Park, Illinois, in 1953. He received a BA from the University of Colorado at Boulder in English (1976) and a Certificate of Poetics (1980) from the Jack Kerouac School of Disembodied Poetics at Naropa University where he was a teaching assistant to Allen Ginsberg. He received his M.S. Ed. in English and Deaf Education from the University of Rochester and the National Technical Institute for the Deaf (NTID) in 1986.

== Career ==
In 1980, Cohn published his first collection of poems, Green Sky. In 1989 Prairie Falcon was published by North Atlantic Books. In 1987, he coordinated the first National Deaf Poetry Conference, in Rochester, NY. In 1990, he became editor to an annual poetry magazine, Napalm Health Spa.

In 1995, Cohn began recording with The Abolitionists, a North Bay Area band that featured Mooka Rennick. He began a solo recording artist career beginning with Unspoken Words in 1998. In 2007 he released homage, and in 2008, he released Impermanence, a double CD compilation.

In 1996, Cohn began working on an online poetry project that would explore Beat Generation influences on the Postbeat Poets. In 1997, he founded the on-line Museum of American Poetics. Cohn published his first collection of prose the same year, exploring the theoretical parallels between ASL and modernist poetries in a book entitled Sign Mind: Studies in American Sign Language Poetics.

In a 2011 review of Cohn's Sutras & Bardos: Essays & Interviews on Allen Ginsberg, the Kerouac School, Anne Waldman, The Postbeat Poets & the New Demotics, Beat Studies scholar Jonah Raskin wrote "Perhaps no one in the United States today understands and appreciates the poetic durability and the cultural elasticity of the Beats better than Jim Cohn."

== Bibliography ==
- Treasures for Heaven: Collected Poems 1976-2021, 2022, Giant Steps Press
- If 45 was 16 & 16 was 45, 2020, Museum of American Poetics Publications (Chapbook)
- Birthday News: A Poemoscope, 2018, Museum of American Poetics Publications
- The Ongoing Saga I Told My Daughter: Expanded Edition, 2016, Museum of American Poetics Publications
- The Groundless Ground, 2014, Museum of American Poetics Publications
- Sutras & Bardos: Essays & Interviews on Allen Ginsberg, The Kerouac School, Anne Waldman, Postbeat Poets & The New Demotics, 2011, Museum of American Poetics Publications
- Mantra Winds, 2010, Museum of American Poetics Publications
- The Ongoing Saga I Told My Daughter (original edition), 2009, Museum of American Poetics Publications
- Quien Sabe Mountain, 2004, Museum of American Poetics Publications
- The Golden Body: Meditations on the Essence of Disability, 2003, Museum of American Poetics Publications
- Sign Mind: Studies in American Sign Language Poetics, 1999, Museum of American Poetics Publications
- The Dance of Yellow Lightning Over The Ridge, 1998, Writers & Books Publications
- Grasslands, 1994, Writers & Books Publications
- Prairie Falcon, 1989, North Atlantic Books
- Green Sky, 1980

== Discography ==
- Venerable Madtown Hall 2013, MusEx Records
- Commune 2013, MusEx Records
- Impermanence 2008, MusEx Records
- homage 2007, MusEx Records
- Trashtalking Country 2006, MusEx Records
- Emergency Juke Joint 2002, MusEx Records
- Antenna 2000, MusEx Records
- Unspoken Words 1998, MusEx Records
- Walking Thru Hell Gazing at Flowers 1996, MusEx Records
- The Road 1995, MusEx Records
