= Indian Journals =

Travel Diary made by American Poet Allen Ginsberg

Indian Journals: March 1962 – May 1963
- Author: Allen Ginsberg
- Language: English
- Subject: Travel diary; India
- Publisher: City Lights Books & Dave Haselwood Books
- Publication date: 1970
- Publication place: United States
- Media type: Print (Paperback)
- Pages: 210 pp

Indian Journals: March 1962 – May 1963 is a travel diary by American poet Allen Ginsberg, first published by Dave Haselwood Books and City Lights Books in 1970.

The journal is a collection of recollections, reflections, photographs, sketches, poems and associative ephemera from Ginsberg's journey in India with partner Peter Orlovsky between 1962 and 1963.

== Background ==
Ginsberg and Orlovsky travelled from Israel to India in March 1962 to explore and meet Ginsberg's friend and fellow poet Gary Snyder and partner Joanne Kyger. Despite warnings from Ginsberg's friend Peter Bowles to avoid the local food and stick to high end accommodation, Ginsberg and Orlovsky dedicated themselves to living in cheap, local accommodation and preserving as much money as possible to extend their stay and engage with local culture.

Ginsberg journeyed extensively across India, living for extended periods in Calcutta and Benares and engaged with spiritual gurus, local sadhus and India's many homeless. The journey also included a joint, bilingual poetry reading with Indian poets and writers, which had a lasting impact on the Indian poetry movement, though the reading itself was seen by some Indian participants as more provocative than productive.

== The Journals ==
Ginsberg's narrative diary entries record graphic descriptions of poverty, his frequent illnesses, his and Orlovsky's heavy and frequent use of opium, ganja and ether, as well as interactions with locals, and exchanges with friends abroad. Many passages detail Ginsberg's reflections on the nature of life and death after viewing many ghat ceremonies in Calcutta and the confronting, abject poverty.

The scrapbook form of the Journals also includes newspaper clippings, lecture notes, names and addresses of contacts, many black and white photographs and poetry. Among the many poems drafted in the Journals are a death poem to Ginsberg's mentor and influence William Carlos Williams, who died while Ginsberg was in Benares, a range of work reflecting on or written while sitting beneath Howrah Bridge, and an early form of "Stotras to Kali Destroyer of Illusions". Several works from this period were later published in Planet News by City Lights Books.

Many of the photographs published in Indian Journals portray the leprous beggars in the vicinity of Ginsberg and Orlovsky's hotels and pensions, candid self-portraits and portraits of sadhus, along with photographs of severed limbs of train accident victims seen in their many rail journeys.

== Publication and reception ==
The first edition of Indian Journals was published in 1970, after five years of transcription, editing and compilation, with a nude photograph of Shambu Bharti Baba serving as the cover. A second paperback edition was published by Grove Press in 1996 with a scrapbook collage cover. Ginsberg's idiosyncratic spelling, punctuation, grammar and syntax were retained unaltered in both editions

Indian Journals was seen by Helen Vendler in the New York Times as the record of a turning point in Ginsberg's focus, having been through a mid-life crisis from which he emerged "a geographer, and his one inexhaustible subject is the earth and what it looks like." Raj Chandarlapaty sees the Journals "rich with deeply sensual associations of consciousness and transcendental signifiers suggesting the possibility of a mass cultural revolution that could redesign world ethics and man's social performativity."

Gayathri Prabhu wrote that Journals recorded a period of transcendental experience for Ginsberg as a Westerner, "pushing the boundaries of his tourist persona, throwing himself into the most alien and morbid and then staying immersed in it till he can glean some form of personal truth" and functioned as a "brilliant evocation of transnationalism". He also sees Ginsberg's journey as different from the "earlier Western project of 'saving' India from its squalor" in which "Ginsberg attempts to pay more attention to Indian poverty without simply condemning it" and called Ginsberg's depiction of poverty a "profound, ambivalent experience".
