= Reality Sandwiches =

Book by Allen Ginsberg

First edition

Reality Sandwiches is a book of poetry by Allen Ginsberg published by City Lights Publishers in 1963. The title comes from one of the included poems, "On Burroughs' Work": "A naked lunch is natural to us,/we eat reality sandwiches." The book is dedicated to friend and fellow Beat poet Gregory Corso. Despite Ginsberg's feeling that this collection was not his most significant, the poems still represent Ginsberg at a peak period of his craft.

Poems in this collection include:

- "My Alba"
- "The Green Automobile"
- "Siesta in Xbalba"
- "On Burroughs' Work"
- "Love Poem on Theme by Whitman"
- "Malest Cornifici Tuo Catullo"
- "Dream Record: June 8, 1955"
- "A Strange New Cottage in Berkeley"
- "My Sad Self"
- "I Beg You Come Back & Be Cheerful"
- "To An Old Poet In Peru"
- "Aether"

== Selected works ==
=== "On Burroughs' Work" ===
According to legend, while Ginsberg and Jack Kerouac were editing Naked Lunch by William S. Burroughs, Kerouac suggested the title; when Ginsberg asked what it meant, Kerouac said they'd figure it out later. This is perhaps an attempt at understanding. It is unusual for a Ginsberg poem because it is so overtly metaphorical. This is likely a purposeful deviation from his normal style since he, for example, ironically calls symbolic language and allegories useless "dressing" and "lettuce." The style overall suggests a parody of formal poetry. He uses allegories and near-rhymes: "those" and "Rose"; "us" and "lettuce"; "visions" and "prisons," and so on. The form would be considered an imperfect ballad stanza, with the first and third lines in each stanza being nearly an iambic tetrameter and the first and third lines being nearly iambic trimeter. This is a traditional form used, for example, by William Wordsworth. The mistakes in the meter are likely purposeful; Ginsberg's early poetry suggests that he was fully capable of writing metered poetry. But this is perhaps not only an homage to Burroughs but an homage to Ginsberg's mentor William Carlos Williams. Williams encouraged Ginsberg to break away from meter and focus only the object with no "symbolic dressing."

=== "Dream Record: June 8, 1955" ===
An account of a dream about an encounter with the apparition of Joan Vollmer who was shot to death when her husband, William S. Burroughs, in a drunken stupor, decided to play William Tell with a shot glass. Ginsberg had been in Mexico City visiting the couple only a short time before the shooting. He says at the beginning of the poem that he has returned to Mexico City. There he encounters Joan, and they talk about their friends: Jack Kerouac, Herbert Huncke, and someone named Kenney. Then, when Ginsberg realizes it is a dream and that Joan is dead, he asks more profound questions: "what kind of knowledge have the dead? can you still love your mortal acquaintances? what do you remember of us?" Ginsberg then sees a grave. This paratactical shift, according to Ginsberg, was a major breakthrough. This breakthrough was integral in the development of what he would call his "ellipse" technique or the "eyeball kick." Ginsberg's study of haiku, Ezra Pound, Paul Cézanne, and the poetry of the Surrealists was also important in the development of this technique, but Ginsberg often pointed to "Dream Record" as a breakthrough poem. This was also the poem that Ginsberg sent to Kenneth Rexroth which Rexroth hated because he said it was too stilted. Rexroth told Ginsberg he should free up his voice, write from his heart. Soon after that Ginsberg wrote Howl. Howl shows the effects of his earlier breakthrough: the "eyeball kick," for example, is employed throughout the poem.

=== "To An Old Poet In Peru" ===
Allen Ginsberg was travelling in South America in 1960 with Lawrence Ferlinghetti. After being in Chile and Bolivia, he arrived alone to Peru, approximately in May. He spent some weeks camping near to Machu Picchu. Then in Lima he knew the Peruvian poet Martín Adán who was living in the Hotel El Comercio where Ginsberg rented a room. During those days he wrote some poems of Reality Sandwiches, like the long "To An Old Poet In Peru" that has three parts: the one that named the poem, "Die Greatly In Thy Solitude" and "The Dazzling Intelligence". The poem describes a closer relationship and fine sympathy between the two poets. The poem was translated to Spanish by the Peruvian poet Antonio Cisneros and published on the # 7 of the Amaru magazine on 1968.
