= Harry Fainlight =

Harry Fainlight (1935–1982) was a British/American poet associated with the Beats movement.

He was the younger brother of Ruth Fainlight (b 1931), also a poet, who edited a posthumous volume of his work, Selected Poems, published in 1986.

== Personal life ==
Educated at English grammar schools and Cambridge University, where he was contemporary with Ted Hughes, Fainlight was a precocious youth who admired the Beat poets and published in English magazines like Encounter from his early twenties. Dual citizenship gave him the opportunity to travel freely to the US and view heroes such as Allen Ginsberg at first-hand. He stayed in New York for three years from 1962. During his sojourn there, Ginsberg called him, "the most gifted English poet of his generation", and Fainlight contributed to Fuck You, a radical arts magazine published by Ed Sanders. Like Ginsberg, Fainlight was Jewish, homosexual and a keen user of drugs. His American work included a poem, "Mescaline Notes" and a disturbing epic about a bad LSD trip, "The Spider".

Fainlight returned to London in the spring of 1965; there, small imprint, Turret Books, issued the only volume published in England in his lifetime, Sussicran, a slim 12-page pamphlet. The title is "Narcissus" reversed.

Fainlight never sustained a significant relationship, never lived with anyone and was, according to his sister, "in and out of mental hospitals all his adult life." From 1976, he lived in a remote cottage in Powys, Wales. In 1982, while suffering from bronchial pneumonia, he went for an evening walk in light clothing. He was found later lying in a field dead from hypothermia.

== The International Poetry Incarnation, 11 June 1965 ==
When Ginsberg visited London in June 1965 he gave a reading at Better Books in Charing Cross Road which proved extremely popular. The shop's manager Barry Miles suggested a larger event, incorporating fellow beat writers Lawrence Ferlinghetti and Gregory Corso who were due in the city. Ginsberg’s girlfriend of the time, Barbara Rubin, asked which was the largest venue in London. Sue Miles, wife of Barry, mentioned the Royal Albert Hall. Rubin spontaneously booked the 5000-seat venue for 10 days later.

Incredibly, for a modern poetry reading, the International Poetry Incarnation was more than sold out. It was, says Miles – in Stephen Gammond’s film, A Technicolour Dream (2008) – "like a poetry rave," the first sign of many like-minds being interested in "underground' art.

Harry Fainlight was one of 17 poets booked to appear alongside Ginsberg. His sublime performance can be seen in Peter Whitehead's film of the event, Wholly Communion (1965). The packed hall takes against the young poet as he begins to read 'The Spider' and is interrupted by Dutch writer Simon Vinkenoog, high on mescalin, who chants "Love, love!" when the crowd becomes restless. It was hard for Fainlight to continue reading after this. The occasion upset him deeply, though was typical of various crises and outrages in a troubled life. Ruth Fainlight later wrote, in Fainlight's Selected Poems, that the event 'was probably the moment of his greatest public success in England'.

== International Times ==
Fainlight became a founding contributor of International Times (IT), a countercultural newspaper launched in October 1966 from the basement of the Indica Bookshop. Tales From The Embassy, a trilogy of stories by Dave Tomlin (another guiding spirit behind IT) features Fainlight as poet Harry Flame. The narrator recalls smiling at Flame on a beautiful morning, the latter replying with a grimace: "I’ll get you for that!",

When, at the suggestion of Ted Hughes, Faber & Faber offered to publish Fainlight’s work, he lit a petrol-soaked rag and posted it through the publisher’s letterbox. But he also joined in with the antic spirit of the time. In late summer 1967 John "Hoppy" Hopkins organised a parade, "The Death and Resurrection of IT". Fainlight appeared in this piece of improvised street theatre as the human personification of the magazine. He was carried in a coffin on a 'rebirth journey' from the Cenotaph in Whitehall to Notting Hill Gate (including a ride on the Circle Line), where the procession wound through Portobello Market and IT (Fainlight) was symbolically resurrected at the Tavistock Road junction.

However, when Michael Horovitz's anthology, Children of Albion: Poetry of the Underground in Britain was published by Penguin in 1967, Fainlight, amongst a few other underground poets of the time, was not included.

== Selected Poems ==
In his review of From The Notebooks, a book transcribed by Dave Tomlin from a lecture Fainlight gave at the Cambodian Embassy in the '70s, Niall McDevitt called the 78-page Selected Poems (Turret, London, 1986), edited by Ruth Fainlight "underwhelming", noting that pastoral works far outnumbered the poems inspired by his years in New York and asked "where were the gay-sex-in-toilets poems or the out-of-it-on-drugs poems?" Ruth Fainlight responded with a letter she received from her brother in 1981. Harry Fainlight wrote: "Your particular duty now is to help preserve the poetry that I wrote before I went to America (& since) & which belongs to your own literary area but which has been cut off & isolated from it by those three intervening years. Politically, it is only the work of those three years which they wish to exploit. And the formulae of exploitation are very profitable & so they keep on repeating them. But they have become more & more irrelevant to the whole of my work; those years exist in it only as a body of water, a lake in a far greater surrounding land mass. Certainly they are not where I live. I am saying all this because there is still no one who really cares enough to be responsible for my work; to protect it from the inroads of philistinism. If you do not, it encourages the philistine movement."

Niall McDevitt believes that the full range of Fainlight's writing needs to be collected – preferably in a single volume paperback – so that readers can properly understand his uniqueness. "That he was a lyric poet with an original gift makes his short unfinished oeuvre important, but that he was also voicing his experiences of Jewishness, homosexuality, drug-taking and mental illness guarantees him a future readership in many quarters."

== The Place of Dead Roads ==
Fainlight is obliquely commemorated in William Burroughs' 1983 novel The Place of Dead Roads, when the title image is explained: "And what is a dead road? Well, senor, somebody you used to meet, un amigo, tal vez... Remember [...] 24 Arundle [sic] Terrace in London? So many dead roads." Phil Baker has traced this to Arundel Gardens, a terrace in Notting Hill where Fainlight lived at number 24 during 1968-69. He had a brief sexual liaison with Burroughs and they remained friends; news of his death, which Burroughs received while writing the book, would have been a stimulus to the memory of Arundel Gardens as a "dead road".

== Fragments of a Lost Voice ==
In 2008 a suitcase containing a bundle of papers were discovered in a Welsh barn left there by Harry sometime before his death. Amongst the papers were two handwritten and unfinished poems, (City I & City II.) These were deciphered by 22 poets who then wrote new poems inspired by these fragments. The results were curated by Dave Tomlin and published as 'Fragments of a Lost Voice'.
