= Wholly Communion =

1965 British film by Peter Whitehead

- Directed by: Peter Whitehead
- Release date: 1965
- Running time: 33 minutes
- Country: United Kingdom
- Language: English

Wholly Communion is a short documentary film made in 1965 by British filmmaker Peter Whitehead. It was filmed at the Royal Albert Hall, London, and documents a poetry event held on 11 June 1965 called the International Poetry Incarnation. It features poetry readings by Beat poets from the UK and U.S.

== Cast ==
- Gregory Corso
- Harry Fainlight
- Lawrence Ferlinghetti
- Allen Ginsberg
- Michael Horovitz
- Ernst Jandl
- Christopher Logue
- Adrian Mitchell
- Alexander Trocchi
- Andrei Voznesensky

== Reception ==
The Monthly Film Bulletin wrote: "As a record of that celebrated meeting of poets which packed the Royal Albert Hall last June, Wholly Communion certainly has its points: here, preserved for the curious and the social historian, are the narcissistically mumbling poets (Logue, Ferlinghetti and Mitchell are notable exceptions), and the huge audience, which came expecting one knows not what, listening reverentially (did they enjoy themselves?). Aside from its interest as a document, unfortunately, the film is a clumsy piece of work. The single camera, rather uncertainly doing its best to give an overall coverage, wobbles and shudders, zooms in to a target, misses, tries again and re-focuses, in a poor approximation to the much more professional American cinéma-vérité approach. A good deal of the framing is also ugly, and there is an interminable sequence in which the camera seems to be hypnotised by a girl in the audience who is waving her arms about like a third-rate interpretative dancer in time to Ginsberg's poetical mutterings."
