= White Shroud Poems =

Book by Allen Ginsberg

First edition (publ. Harper & Row)

White Shroud Poems: 1980–1985 is a book of poetry by American writer Allen Ginsberg published in 1986.

== See also ==
- Jack Kerouac School of Disembodied Poetics
- Milarepa
