= Michael Ferber =

American writer (born 1944)

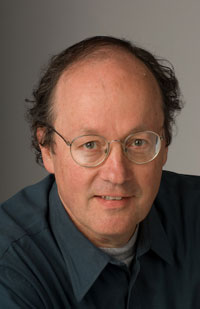
- Born: Michael Kelvin Ferber; July 1, 1944 (age 82); Buffalo, New York
- Occupations: English professor, author, activist

Michael Kelvin Ferber (born July 1, 1944) was the youngest of the five defendants in the federal anti-draft trial in the spring of 1968 in Boston, Massachusetts. The trial attracted national attention because one of the defendants was Dr. Benjamin Spock, the well-known pediatrician and author of the best-selling The Common Sense Book of Baby and Child Care. The other defendants were the Rev. William Sloane Coffin Jr., chaplain of Yale University; Mitchell Goodman, novelist and teacher; and Marcus Raskin, a lawyer who served briefly on the U.S. National Security Council under Kennedy and co-founded the Institute for Policy Studies. The trial was known as "The Spock Trial" and the defendants as "The Boston Five".

== Early life and education ==
Ferber was born in Buffalo, New York, one of two children of Kelvin Ferber, a chemist, and Renette Bernhard Ferber. His older sister, Joanna Ferber Shulman, is now a retired obstetrician-gynecologist living in New York City. He attended Bennett High School in Buffalo and Swarthmore College in Pennsylvania (BA in Greek Literature 1966); while at Swarthmore he was active in the student group supporting the civil rights movement in the nearby city of Chester, where he was arrested for a sit-in in the city hall in the fall of 1963.

== Involvement in Vietnam War resistance movement and the Boston Five ==
While a doctoral student in English at Harvard University, Ferber grew increasingly involved in the movement against the U.S. war in Vietnam, and came to feel he should no longer cooperate with the Selective Service System. In fall 1967 he helped organize and publicize a ceremony at the Arlington Street Church, Boston, where draft-age men were to turn in their draft cards and pledge to refuse induction and go to prison. That was the strategy proposed by a group of California students calling themselves "The Resistance," whose main spokesperson was David Harris. Ferber gave a short sermon at the ceremony on Oct. 16 ("A Time to Say No") and, as the only member of the Boston Five who actually had a draft card, joined some 200 men who turned over their cards to several dozen ministers and priests; he then took the cards to Washington where they were added to hundreds more from around the country and given to the Attorney General.

The charge against Ferber and the others was conspiracy to aid, abet, and counsel others to violate the draft law. Technically, persons who advocate refusal of military service in wartime are not legally protected by the First Amendment's freedom of speech clause. The relevant Supreme Court precedent is Schenck v. United States, 1919, upholding the espionage conviction of Charles Schenck for distributing anti-draft leaflets to potential draftees. In 1931, the Schenck ruling was quoted and reiterated in Near v. Minnesota, where Justice Charles Hughes affirmed that the government could suppress speech in order to prevent "obstruction to its recruiting service."

The Boston Five defendants were openly defying this established legal exception to free speech. In order to have their day in court, the defendants pleaded not guilty, but judge Francis Ford ruled out any arguments about the war, the draft itself, or the constitutionality of their speech. Ferber and all the others but Raskin were convicted, sentenced to two years in prison, and released on personal recognizance, pending appeal. A year later the appellate court threw out the case on largely procedural grounds. The government did not appeal the reversal of conviction, and the case was dropped. No defendant served time, and they all became well-known organizers in the anti-war movement.

== Academic career ==
Ferber withdrew from Harvard for two years to write a book, The Resistance, with the historian Staughton Lynd. He returned in 1971 and completed his Ph.D. in 1975, with a thesis on William Blake. After serving as an assistant professor at Yale (1975–1982), he joined the Coalition for a New Foreign Policy as a staff member, writing articles and lobbying Congress on disarmament and arms control. In 1987 he became a professor of English at the University of New Hampshire, where he taught until 2018. He has published several books about poetry, as well as A Dictionary of Literary Symbols (2nd ed. Cambridge University Press, 2007), and remains active in social and political movements. Two marriages ended in divorce. He has been married to Susan Arnold since 1987; they have a daughter, Lucy Arnold, who lives in San Francisco.

== Books authored ==
- The Resistance. Boston: Beacon Press, 1971. (With Staughton Lynd)
- The Social Vision of William Blake. Princeton: Princeton University Press, 1985.
- The Poetry of William Blake. London: Penguin, 1991.
- The Poetry of Shelley. London: Penguin, 1993.
- A Dictionary of Literary Symbols. Cambridge: Cambridge University Press, 1999; 2nd ed. 2007; 3rd ed. 2017.
- European Romantic Poetry. New York: Pearson Longman, 2005. (Edited)
- A Companion to European Romanticism. Oxford: Blackwell, 2005. (Edited)
- Romanticism: A Very Short Introduction. Oxford: Oxford University Press, 2010
- The Cambridge Introduction to British Romantic Poetry. Cambridge: Cambridge University Press, 2012.
- Poetry and Language: The Linguistics of Verse. Cambridge: Cambridge University Press, 2019.

== See also ==
- List of peace activists
