= Spike Hawkins =

British poet (born 1943)

Spike Hawkins (1943–2017) was a British poet, best known for his "Three Pig Poems", included in his one book, the Fulcrum Press collection The Lost Fire-Brigade (1968). He was part of the poetry scene in Liverpool during the 1960s and much of his output upholds the values of that group; short, modernistic, humorous pieces of free verse. He was published in Encounter, International Times, The Guardian and in the 1972 anthology The Old Pals' Act, edited by Pete Brown.

He was a friend of Johnny Byrne; together, they formed the surreal act "Poisoned Bellows". He was a friend of Syd Barrett, a founder of Pink Floyd. Hawkins continued to be active, for example performing in the 2005 Poetry Olympics at the Royal Albert Hall, having originally performed there in the International Poetry Incarnation in 1965.

Also a mimic, he could imitate Harold Wilson very well.

== See also ==
- Liverpool poets
