= Mitchell Goodman =

American writer, teacher, and activist

Mitchell Goodman (December 13, 1923 – February 1, 1997) was an American writer, teacher, and activist. He is best known for his role in the Vietnam draft resistance movement, which drew the high-profile 1968 federal prosecution of the "Boston Five."

== Life and career ==
Mitchell Goodman was born in Brooklyn, New York in 1923. His parents, Irving and Adele, were first and second generation Jewish immigrants and were well off until Irving lost his clothing store in the Great Depression. Goodman was given a scholarship to Harvard and was at college when the U.S. entered World War II. He was trained as a Second Lieutenant forward observer in an artillery battalion, but was not deployed overseas. He traveled to Europe following the war, where he met the poet Denise Levertov. The two were married in 1947 and continued to live briefly in France and Italy before moving to the U.S. to Greenwich Village in 1948. A son was born in 1949. These experiences informed his vivid 1961 anti-war novel The End of It, which focuses on an American soldier's experience in the Italian campaign. The book received a positive reception from critics and prominent literary figures such as William Carlos Williams, and Norman Mailer.

In the mid-1960s Goodman and Levertov both became prominent in the anti-war movement.The two began by running paid advertisements in national publications with statements of protest signed by writers, artists and others. In March 1966, he was involved in organizing the Fifth Avenue Peace parade in New York City, in which an estimated 30,000 people took part. In March 1967 Goodman led a walkout during Vice President Hubert Humphrey's address at the National Book Awards, in which he shouted, "Vice President, we are burning women and children in Vietnam, and you and we are responsible!" The quote was carried in newspapers nationwide. Later that year, as described in the opening of Norman Mailer's book The Armies of the Night, Goodman helped organize the anti-Vietnam war demonstration at the Pentagon in October 1967, the first national protest against the war. As part of the planning for this event, he circulated a pamphlet stating:

We are planning an act of direct creative resistance to the war and the draft in Washington on Friday, October 20... . We will appear at the Justice Department together with 30 or 40 young men brought by us to Washington to represent the 24 Resistance groups from all over the country. There we will present to the Attorney General the draft cards turned in locally by these groups on October 16... . We will, in a clear, simple ceremony, make concrete our affirmation of support for these young men who are the spearhead of direct resistance to the war and all of its machinery... . [Signed] Mitchell Goodman, Henry Braun, Denise Levertov, Noam Chomsky, William Sloane Coffin, Dwight Macdonald.

Prior to the protest, Goodman was one among the writers of "A Call To Resist Illegitimate Authority"; he became a member of the steering committee of the anti-war group Resist, which emerged from that Call. The "Call to Resist" expressed moral and religious outrage against the war in Vietnam, its unconstitutionality, war crimes, and the forced military service of conscientious objectors. It concluded by committing its signers to continue to provide material and moral support to draft resisters. The "Call" was published in the New Republic and the New York Review of Books with over three hundred signatures of prominent writers, activists and clergy on October 12, 1967.

These documents and his protest actions led to his indictment for conspiring to counsel, aid and abet violations of the Selective Service law and to hinder administration of the draft. He was indicted for conspiracy alongside Benjamin Spock, a famous doctor and author, Marcus Raskin, leader of a Washington think tank, Rev. William Sloane Coffin, chaplain at Yale, and Michael Ferber, a graduate student at Harvard, in what became known as the "Boston Five" conspiracy trial. The defendants stood by their support of draft resisters, but denied the conspiracy charges. The defendants and others in the resistance movement had hoped to put the morality and legitimacy of the war on trial, but this was largely prevented by Judge Ford, who was widely seen to favor the prosecution. Nevertheless, the defendants' principled stand and stature as professionals was seen by many as lending mainstream legitimacy to the actions of youthful draft resisters. The trial and its appeals were covered extensively in the media, and in a book by Jessica Mitford, published in 1969.

All the defendants were convicted and sentenced to two years in prison, except for Raskin, who did not advocate civil disobedience, but merely an inquest into the legality of the war. The conviction was appealed, and the appellate court ruled that Judge Ford had overstepped in his instructions to the jury by giving a list of ten yes or no questions to be answered as part of their deliberation, a list which had possibly been drawn up in collaboration with the prosecution. Spock and Ferber were acquitted by the appeals court, which ruled that their actions were covered by the right to free speech in the First Amendment. However, Goodman and Rev. Coffin were ruled to have been more closely involved with the illegal acts in the draft card protests, and so were to be retried in the Federal District Court. The Justice Department declined to pursue the case, stating that a conviction for conspiracy would be too hard to win given that three of the original conspirators had been acquitted. Others believed that the Justice Department did not want to give further publicity to the case. Jessica Mitford and Alan Dershowitz argued that the prosecution for conspiracy rather than for specific crimes was an attempt to repress organized public opposition to the war. Evidence for this view includes the indictment, which cited "diverse other persons, some known and others unknown" belonging to the conspiracy, implying they could also be prosecuted. Also, the prosecutor John Wall went as far as pursuing the "applause theory," that those who expressed public support for the defendants' statements could be considered part of the conspiracy.

In a letter published in the New York Review of Books April 10, 1969, the day after the dismissal of his case, Goodman stated that student-run draft resistance groups, such as The Resistance, were the cutting edge of the anti-war movement and, by risking and serving jail time, were the "bravest guys in America." He did not accept the charge of "inciting" draft resistance because he felt that did not account for the strength of the individual moral decisions taken by the draft resistors in the face of severe personal consequences. He also gave credit to tens of thousands of people who stood up to what he considered government intimidation by taking part in similar public protests, or by signing letters of solidarity requesting to be indicted on the same conspiracy charges as the "Boston Five."

From 1968 to 1970 Goodman, along with collaborators Robbie Kahn Pfeufer and Kathy Mulherin, assembled a compendium of source material from the political movements of the preceding decade and a half entitled The Movement Toward a New America: The Beginnings of a Long Revolution. Described in a New York Times review as a "telephone-book thick proceedings" of 750 pages, it includes essays, manifestos, journalism, and reflections from mainstream publications, radical magazines and student newspapers. Self-declared as, "1. A Comprehension, 2. A Compendium, 3. A Handbook, 4. A Guide, 5. A History, 6. A Revolution Kit, 7. A Work-in-Progress," the book captured the ferment at the height of The Movement through sheer force of inclusiveness. Although out of print today, it remains a monumental assemblage of first hand cultural references from the radical movements of the 1960s.

In his later years, Goodman resided in Temple, Maine where he wrote poetry and took part in local politics, including standing in solidarity with the workers in the International Paper strike in Jay, Maine. He and Denise Levertov divorced in 1975. He died in 1997, months before Levertov.

== Partial bibliography ==
- 1961 – The End of It: A Novel. New York, Horizon Press. (Republished 1989 by Farrar Straus & Giroux with a foreword by Gloria Emerson)
- 1970 – The Movement Toward a New America: The Beginnings of a Long Revolution; (A Collage) A What? 1. A Comprehension 2. A Compendium 3. A Handbook 4. A Guide 5. A History 6. A Revolution Kit 7. A Work-in-Progress. New York: United Church Press; Pilgrim Press; Knopf; Random House
- 1984 – A Life in Common: Poems. South Harpswell, ME: Dog Ear Press
- 1989 – More Light: Selected Poems. South Harpswell, ME: Dog Ear Press
