= Henry Braun =

American poet, teacher, and peace activist

Henry Braun (July 25, 1930 – Oct. 11, 2014) was an American poet, teacher, and peace activist.

== Biography ==
Henry Braun was born in Olean, New York in 1930. His mother died when he was two years old, and he grew up in an orphanage and foster homes in Buffalo. He was later raised by his father, and attended Hutchinson Central High School.

Braun left the University of Buffalo after his freshman year and attended Brandeis University on a full scholarship, where he studied with Claude Vigee and J.V. Cunningham. He also met Joan Lapedos, his future wife. After graduating from Brandeis, he spent a year in France on a Fulbright. He and Joan married in France on June 14, 1956. Braun returned to Brandeis for an M.A. before studying at Boston University, where he knew Robert Lowell as a professor and Anne Sexton and Donald Junkins as classmates.

In the 1960s he opposed the Vietnam War, organizing poetry read-ins, donating his war tax dollars to a veterans' hospital and to Philadelphia public schools (for which he was convicted of tax evasion) and organizing a draft card turn-in at the Justice Department (for which he was an unindicted co-conspirator at the "Boston Five" trial).

Braun taught literature and creative writing was at Temple University, including a year at Temple's campus in Japan. He also organized poetry events at the Philadelphia YM-YWHA and was a frequent teacher at Robert Bly's Conference on the Great Mother and the New Father.

In 1968 his first poetry collection, The Vergil Woods, was published by Atheneum and nominated for the Pulitzer Prize. His book, Loyalty: New and Selected Poems, was the first offering of Off the Grid Press. He was a Contributing Editor for the American Poetry Review.

He lived off the grid in Weld, Maine with his wife until his death in 2014.

In 2015 the Henry Braun Memorial Poetry Prize was instituted through the University of Maine System and is open to a past or present student or graduate student between 18 and 35 years of age.

== Bibliography ==
- The Vergil Woods (Atheneum, 1968)
- Loyalty: New and Selected Poems (Off the Grid Press, 2006)
