= Corso: The Last Beat =

- Directed by: Gustave Reininger
- Written by: Gustave Reininger
- Narrated by: Ethan Hawke
- Cinematography: Harry Dawson; Richard Rutkowski
- Edited by: Damien LeVeck
- Release date: October 2009 (Hamptons Film Festival)
- Countries: United States; Italy

Corso: The Last Beat is a 2009 documentary film, with on-screen narration by Ethan Hawke and appearances by Patti Smith, Allen Ginsberg, William Burroughs and Gregory Corso.

== Synopsis ==
The Beat Generation’s Gregory Corso became one of four in the inner circle of the Beats, along with Jack Kerouac, Allen Ginsberg, William S. Burroughs. Corso grew up in foster homes, on the streets of Little Italy and Greenwich Village. Corso was sentenced to Clinton State Prison for stealing a $50 suit to go on a date; there, protected by Mafia inmates, Corso read his way through a three-year sentence and ended up at Harvard. He eventually met Allen Ginsberg at a dyke bar in the West Village. After Allen Ginsberg’s death, Corso goes "On the Road" to rediscover his creative Muse. From Paris to Venice, Rome to Athens, Mount Parnassus to Jim Morrison’s grave, Corso reflects on the early days of "Beats." In high humor he reveals how "The Beats" emerged in Europe, and paved the way for youth culture, the sexual revolution and even hip-hop. Corso interrupts his tour to revisit Clinton State Prison and inspire young inmates. Returning to Italy, Corso muses on his lost mother, who he believes is dead and buried in Italy. In a stunning discovery, filmmaker Gustave Reininger finds Corso's mother not dead in Italy, but alive in Trenton, N.J. Corso meets his mother on film and discovers she is the Muse he has been seeking. He also discovers that his mother left him to escape the violence and sexual abuse of his father, who lied saying she had returned to Italy. Healing from a life of abandonment, emotional deprivation and abuse, Corso finishes his road trip on the Acropolis in Greece.A revitalized Corso returns to Greenwich Village, only to discover he is dying. He faces his own death with pluck and humor, comforted by Ethan Hawke, Patti Smith and his newfound mother, Michelina.

== Production ==
Gregory Corso who unlike his compatriot Allen Ginsberg, avoided publicity and promotion of the "Beat" label, refused all film and biography requests. Allen Ginsberg introduced Corso to filmmaker Gustave Reininger, and after a lengthy quiz on Gilgamesh, Heraclitus, and St. Clement of Alexandria, Corso decided to allow Reininger to make a film. Reininger had made feature films and created network television but had never attempted non-fiction. Corso proved a challenge. Ginsberg offered to rein in Corso, known for his boisterous and confrontational antics, however a month after Corso agreed, Ginsberg became ill and died precipitously. Corso, with the loss of his best friend and literary alter-ego, became nearly catatonic. Beat fans would accost him, saying "Hey, You're the Last Beat" (Burroughs died shortly after Ginsberg). Corso, angered would always shoot back, "Is that your myth or mine." Reininger considered returning his funding for the film, raised privately, as Corso was non-responsive. Reininger though had an inspiration to take Corso back to Europe, Paris in particular, where the Beats had emerged, working in a small rundown hotel on the Left Bank, on rue Gît-le-Cœur. Corso named it "The Beat Hotel."

Once in Europe, Corso came alive and led Reininger and his film crew on a madcap tour of France, Italy and Greece. The film is shot in the verite style, without much exposition. Corso's street theater antics kept the film's serious tone light ironic. Corso's poetry is woven into the film, with different voices. Discussions are underway with Bob Dylan to read a Corso poem, "Destiny", and with Bono to read "At Oscar Wilde's Tomb."

From Paris, to Rome, to Florence, Delphi and Athens, Corso retraces the steps of him and Ginsberg and Burroughs as young self-proclaimed poets, (though unpublished.) In Venice, Corso muses about his mother who abandoned him, and Reininger proposed finding her grave in Italy. For a year, he quietly searched cemeteries, genealogical records and official documents. His search turned up nothing in Europe, and relentlessly Reininger considered that perhaps the story of his mother's return was a lie told by his father. The search resumed in America, where again from cemeteries, hospital records, church documents and anecdotal accounts, Reininger picked up the trail of the missing mother, which had gone cold 67 years ago. Relentlessly Reininger searched and found that she was not in Italy, and certainly not dead, but 85 and living all her life in Trenton, New Jersey as a waitress, married to a short order cook. Her abandoned son was a secret withheld from her husband and two children. Corso's on screen meeting with his mother had the potential to be explosive.

Corso, about a year thereafter, developed prostate cancer, and summoned Reininger to continue filming on his death bed. His last poker game bring great levity, a visit from Ethan Hawke, a lullaby from Patti Smith, and a final visit with his new-found mother mark the film's third act.

In addition to the film, Reininger commissioned a major bibliography of Corso's letter and holdings in various public and university libraries, conducted by Bill Morgan, the archivist for Allen Ginsberg and Lawrence Ferlinghetti.

The goal of the Corso Project is to restore Corso to his literary place as one of America's premier poets and social revolutionaries.

== Reception ==
Jay Weissberg for Variety felt the documentary left out aspects in Corso's life such as his drug addiction. Natasha Senjanovic thought its style was "somewhat uneven" but still considered it worth watching, "not simply because Reininger’s respect and love for his subject obviously run deep, but because the film is a moving portrait of an artist of unwavering loyalty to his artistry."

It was the audience award winner at Italy's most prestigious Taormina Film Festival. At the Dubai international Film festival it won awards in World Cinema. It was heralded in at the Rome Festival, and a Festival Litteratura in Mantua where it won Best Film. It was received at the Glasgow International Film Festival and then show as a work in progress at the Hamptons International Film Festival.
