= Peter Golding =

English fashion designer

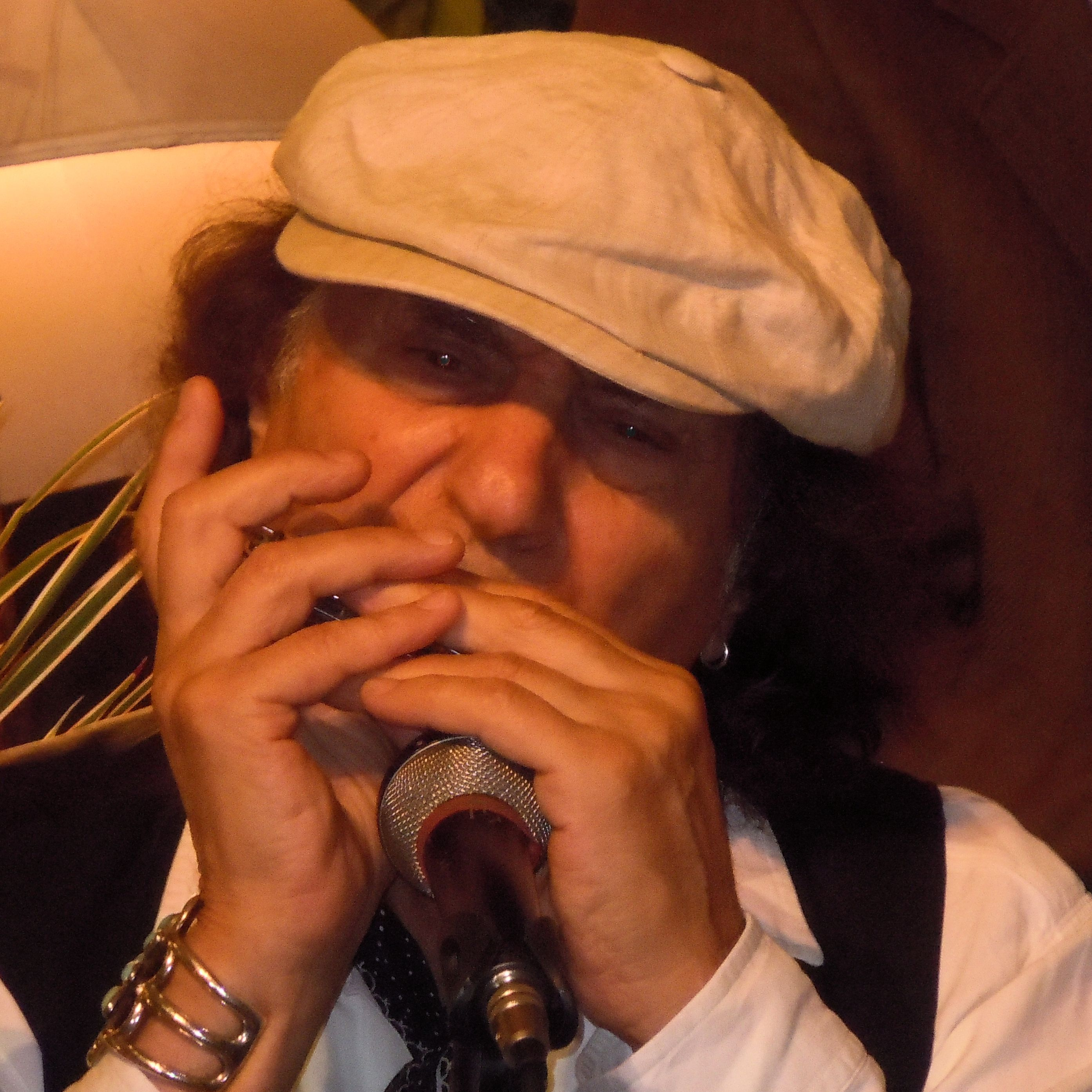
- Born: London, England
- Occupations: Fashion designer Musician

Peter Golding is an English fashion designer who created the first "designer jean" in 1970, opened his clothing store ACE on London's King's Road Chelsea in 1974 and created the first stretch denim jean in 1978. He was the first fashion designer to be invited to join what is now known as the Chartered Society of Designers, and in 2004 was invited by The Queen to Buckingham Palace in recognition of his contribution to British design. He was described by Fashion Weekly as "the Eric Clapton of denim".

== Beginnings and the Beat Hotel, Paris ==
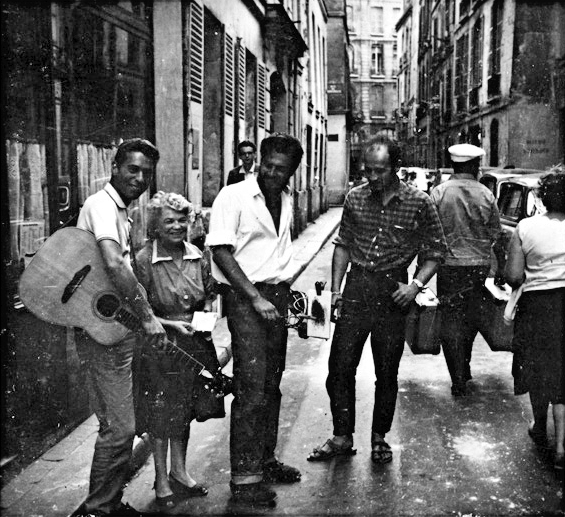
Outside The Beat Hotel Paris: Peter Golding, Madame Rachou (Proprietor) and Robin Page, Peter's busking partner

Golding came from an academic family background, and became a clothing industry management trainee and production manager in his teenage years. An early trip to Paris saw him busk in the streets on blues harp and guitar, and take up residence at No. 9 Git le Coeur, later known as the Beat Hotel, a renowned hangout of Anglo-American beat artists and performers. Golding features in books on the beat generation by Harold Chapman and Mike Evans.

== Fashion design and consultancy ==
On his return Golding worked for the Rael-Brook shirt company as a designer, combining his technical experience with his artistic background, before setting up one of the first professional fashion design consultancies with offices in Old Burlington Street, then Savile Row. He attracted international clients such as Viyella International, Phillips-Van Heusen (US), The International Institute for Cotton, The International Wool Secretariat, ICI (UK), Fabwerke Hoechst AG (Germany) and Hystron Fibers Inc (US), McGregor-Doniger (US), Barracuta (UK) among others.

In 1970 with a commission from Falmer Company Ltd he created what can be considered the world's 'first designer jean' 'Peter Golding for Falmer'.This successful line was followed in 1973 with Peter Golding bleached denim jeanswear which was distributed by Jean Machine and Mayfair Fashions in the UK. In that year Golding also exported these jeans and jackets to the United States through the Brittania Company in Seattle thus introducing the first bleached denim jeanswear to America.

Golding was a visiting lecturer at the Royal College of Art, and was invited to join the Society of Industrial Artists and Designers which today is known as The Chartered Society of Designers of which he is a fellow and previously an assessor for student membership both in the UK and Hong Kong.

== Ace ==
In 1974, Golding opened his flagship store, ACE, in London's King's Road, with sculptures by Andrew Logan and an interior described by European Fashion Guide as "glittering":

This may be the "hottest" store in the world. There is nothing inside here that does not glitter: the jeans, the shirts, the walls and the people. The black walls shine under silver lights, music plays continuously, and there’s no telling what stars may pop in – Liza Minnelli, Rod Stewart, Bianca Jagger or the Rolling Stones’...models, rock stars, movie people and lords and princesses come here for clothes that Golding designs to be both fun and sexy. Famous are the Golding jeans which fit like a second skin.. Alan Flusser – European Fashion Guide US 1977)

Clients included The Rolling Stones, Mick Jagger, Rod Stewart, Freddie Mercury, Queen, Britt Ekland, Twiggy, Yoko Ono, David Bailey, Bianca Jagger, David Bowie, Joan Collins, David Niven, Mary Quant, the Princess of Wales, Cliff Richard, Cilla Black, Ava Gardner, Marlon Brando, Bryan Ferry, Dudley Moore, Richard Burton, Adam Ant, Ossie Clark, Julie Christie, Jerry Hall, Jack Nicholson, Ringo Starr, Liza Minnelli, Zandra Rhodes, and Cher.1984 Ritz Newspaper.The store is mentioned in Bill Wyman's Rolling with the Stones in an anecdote where Keith Richards attempts to try on Peter Golding stretch jeans, but instead takes several pairs on spec.

When the store closed in 1984 an advertisement was taken out in Ritz magazine to thank the celebrity clientele – the "Lords and Ladies of the night" which has become known as the "Ace Goodbyes".

== Original stretch denim jean ==
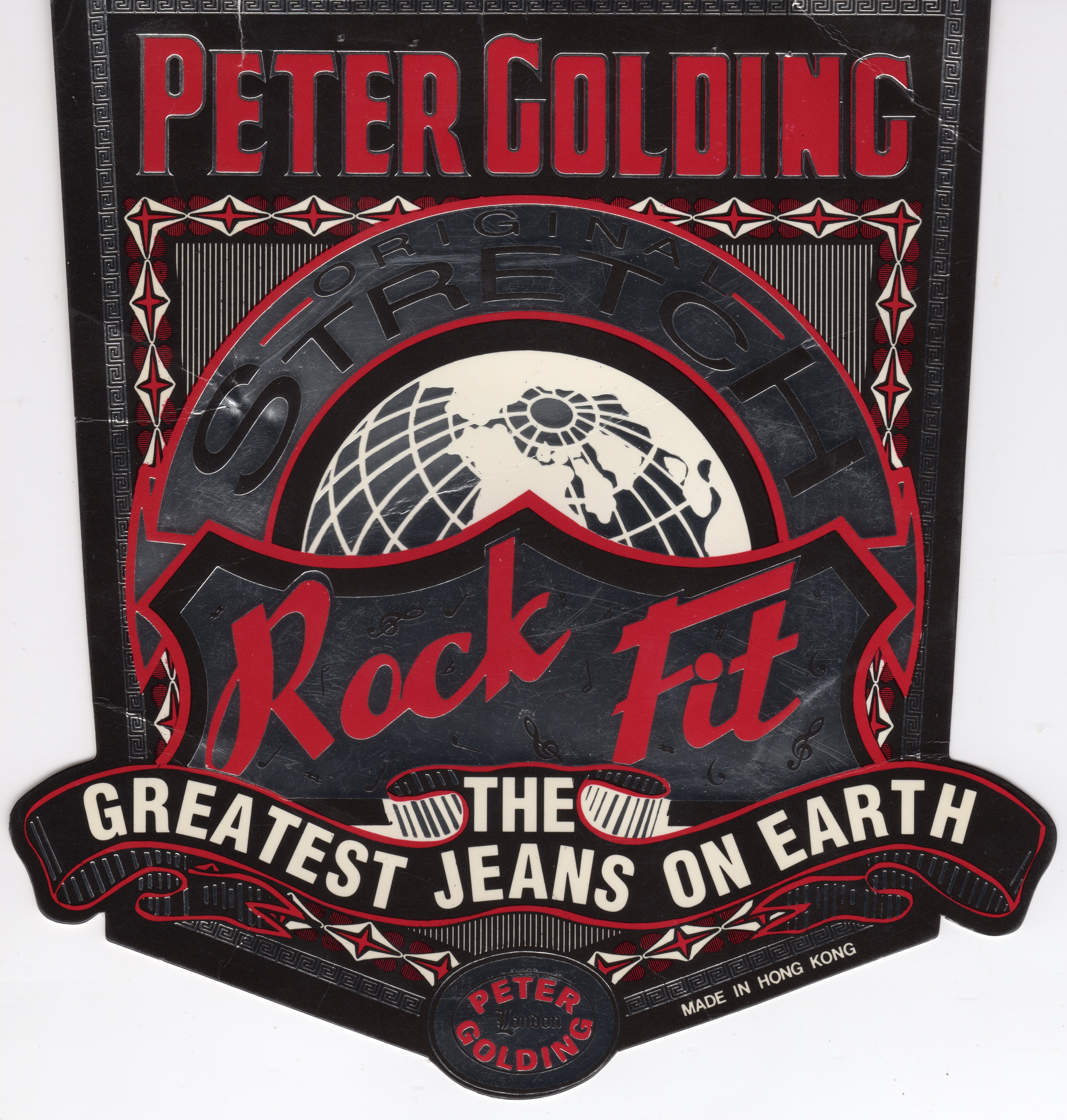
PG Black Rock Fit Jeans Ticket

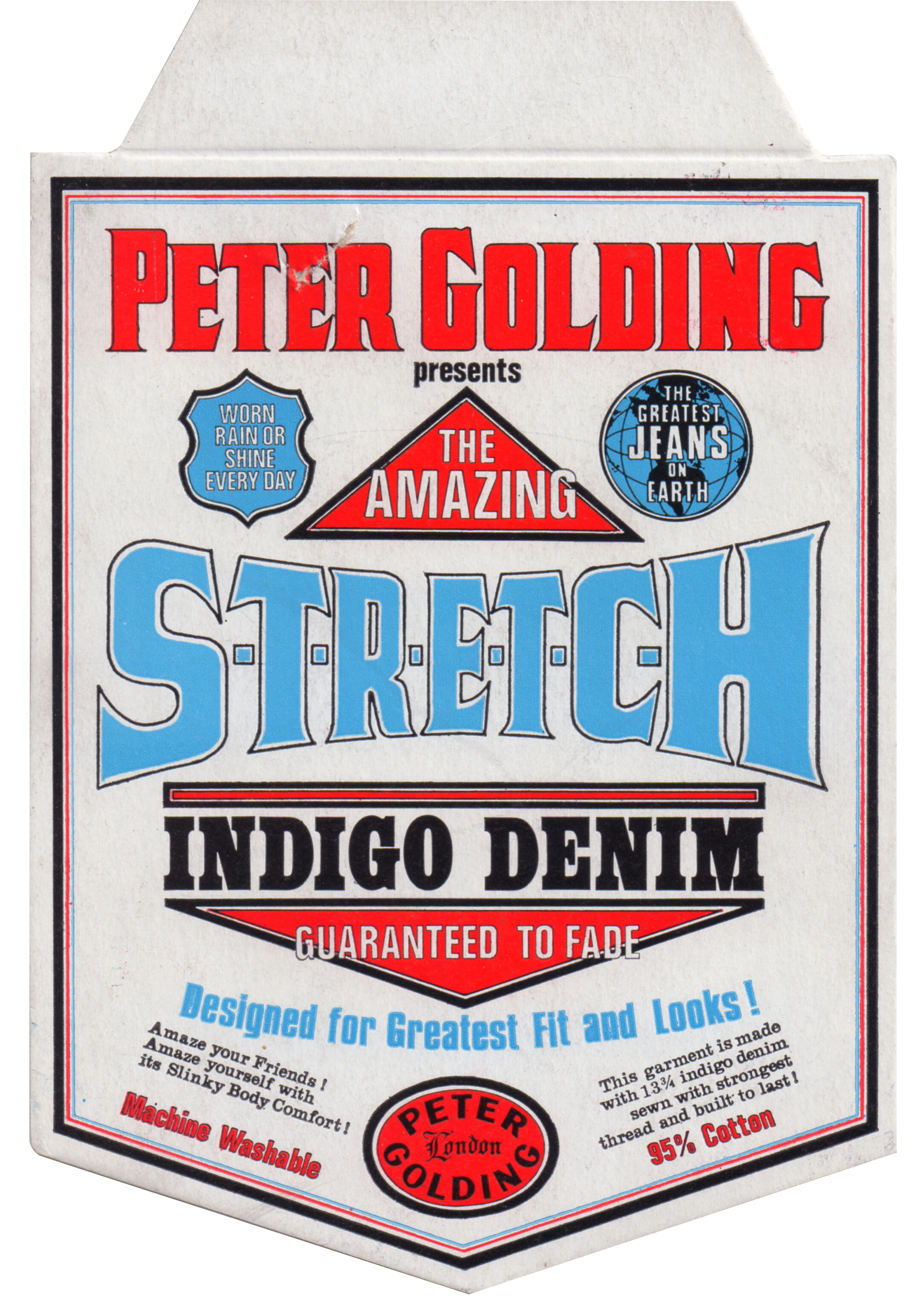
PG Original Stretch Jean Ticket 1978

PG's ACE store was the platform from which Golding created and launched the world's First Stretch Denim Jean in 1978 which was quickly popular with its British and international star-studded clientele.

Design development and early production began in the mid-1970s, as a response to the changing profile of the average jeans wearer. Golding found the solution to the demand for close-fitting jeans in a Japanese stretch indigo denim fabric (96% cotton 4% spandex) and then a sateen stretch fabric in black and plain dyed colours.

The original product was launched in the UK through the ACE store and other outlets, but was swiftly marketed in the US with success, stocked by American celebrity retailers including Fred Segal and Bloomingdales, and worn by LA's Hollywood and music fraternity.

In October 2002, Jerry Hall featured in an article by Hilary Alexander for the Daily Telegraph with photographs by David Bailey to celebrate the 25th anniversary of Peter Golding Stretch Jeans since 1978. British society girl Tamara Beckwith then became the jean's photographic model, being featured in various press articles as well as in Hello and OK celebrity Magazines.

== Rock art collection ==
Golding is also known for his collection of Rock and Roll Art – 'Inspirational Times'.

A selection went to auction under the title 'The Peter Golding Collection of Rock & Roll Art' at Bonhams in New York on 14 May 2008, as a first showing of its kind with a preview tour of the United States in April. The first publicised and curated exhibition for Inspirational Times was held in London in 2003 at Sotheby's Olympia.

In 2005, Golding's Inspirational Times Collection was a major lender to Tate Liverpool's Summer of Love exhibition. It went on to Germany and Austria in 2006 and to the Whitney Museum of American Art in New York City in 2007.

In November 2018, Golding co-curated a book titled ‘Rock Graphics Originals’ with Barry Miles. The book covers artwork that was associated with rock music in the 60s to the 80s and includes posters, album covers, magazine spreads, etc.

== Music ==
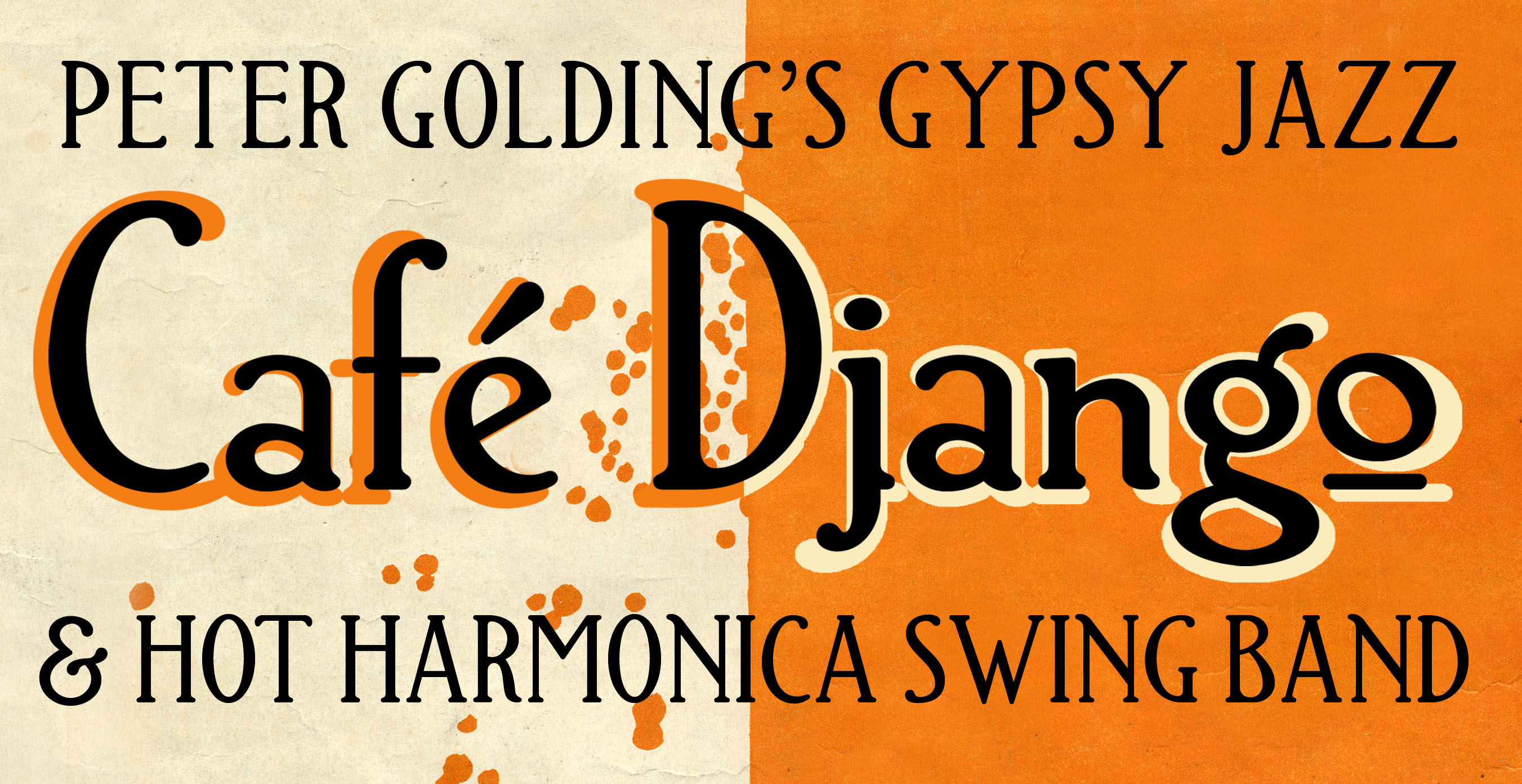

Golding recorded his 1997 album Stretching The Blues with blues musicians, including Otis Grand, Doris Troy and Slim Jim Phantom.

== Bibliography ==
- Rodney Bennett-England (1967) Dress Optional: The Revolution in Menswear – Publisher, Peter Owen Ltd. London ISBN 9780720601107
- The Design Council Educational (1986) Designers Talking: Peter Golding, Fashion Designer :Plus VHS.
- Harold Chapman (1984) The Beat Hotel Paris: Editor Banal Gris
- Bill Wyman, (2002) Rolling with the Stones – Publisher, Dorling Kindersley Ltd. London ISBN 9780751346466
- Paul Gorman, (2006) The Look: Adventures in Rock and Pop Fashion – Publisher, Adelita Ltd. London, ISBN 978-0-9552017-0-7
- Mike Evans (2007) The Beats: From Kerouac to Kesey, an Illustrated Journey Through the Beat Generation – Publisher, Running Press Book Publishers. New York, ISBN 978-0762430482
- Gary Italiaander (2014) Reflections: A Tribute to Larry Adler, Harmonica Genius – Publisher, Delancy Press. London, ISBN 9781907205255
