= Gregory Corso =

American writer (1930–2001)

- Born: Gregory Nunzio Corso; March 26, 1930; New York City, U.S.
- Died: January 17, 2001 (aged 70); Minneapolis, Minnesota, U.S.
- Occupations: Poet, writer
- Movement: Beat, postmodernism

Gregory Nunzio Corso (March 26, 1930 – January 17, 2001) was an American poet. Along with Jack Kerouac, Allen Ginsberg, and William S. Burroughs, he was part of the Beat Generation, as well as one of its youngest members.

== Early life ==
Born Nunzio Corso at New York City's St. Vincent's Hospital (Manhattan), Corso later selected the name "Gregory" as a confirmation name. Within Little Italy and its community he was "Nunzio," while he dealt with others as "Gregory." He often would use "Nunzio" as short for "Annunziato," the announcing angel Gabriel, hence a poet. Corso identified with not only Gabriel but also Hermes, the divine messenger.

Corso's mother, Michelina Corso (born Colonna), was born in Miglianico, Abruzzo, Italy, and immigrated to the United States at the age of nine, with her mother and four other sisters. At 16, she married Sam Corso, a first-generation Italian American, also teenage, and gave birth to Nunzio Corso the same year. They lived at the corner of Bleecker and MacDougal streets, the heart of Greenwich Village and upper Little Italy.

=== Childhood ===
Sometime in his first year, Corso's mother mysteriously abandoned him, leaving him at the New York child care home, a branch of the Catholic Church Charities. Corso's father, Sam "Fortunato" Corso, a garment center worker, found the infant and promptly put him in a foster home. Michelina came to New York from Trenton but her life was threatened by Sam. One of Michelina's sisters was married to a New Jersey mobster who offered to give Michelina her "vengeance," that is to kill Sam. Michelina declined and returned to Trenton without her child. Sam consistently told Corso that his mother had returned to Italy and deserted the family. He was also told that she was a prostitute and was "disgraziata" (disgraced) and forced into Italian exile. Sam told the young boy several times, "I should have flushed you down the toilet." It was 67 years before Corso learned the truth of his mother's disappearance.

Corso spent the next 11 years in foster care in at least five different homes. His father rarely visited him. When he did, Corso was often abused: "I'd spill jello, and the foster home people would beat me. Then my father would visit, and he'd beat me again—a double whammy." As a foster child, Corso was among thousands that the Church aided during the Great Depression, with the intention of reconstituting families as the economy picked up. Corso went to Catholic parochial schools, was an altar boy and a gifted student. His father, in order to avoid the military draft, brought Gregory home in 1941. Nevertheless, Sam Corso was drafted and sent overseas.

Corso, then alone, became a homeless child on the streets of Little Italy. For warmth he slept in subways in the winter, and then slept on rooftops during the summer. He continued to attend Catholic school, not telling authorities he was living on the streets. With permission, he took breakfast bread from a bakery in Little Italy. Street food stall merchants would give him food in exchange for running errands.

=== Adolescence ===
At age 13, Corso was asked to deliver a toaster to a neighbor. While he was running the errand, a passerby offered money (around 94 dollars) for the toaster, and Corso sold it. He used the money to buy a tie and white shirt, and dressed up to see The Song of Bernadette, a movie about the mystical appearance of the Virgin Mary to Bernadette Soubirous at Lourdes. On returning from the movie, the police apprehended him. Corso claimed he was seeking a miracle, namely to find his mother. Corso had a lifelong affection for saints and holy men: "They were my only heroes." Nonetheless, he was arrested for petty larceny and incarcerated in The Tombs, New York's infamous jail. Corso, though only 13 years old, was celled next to an adult, criminally insane murderer who had stabbed his wife repeatedly with a screwdriver. The exposure left Corso traumatized. Neither Corso's stepmother nor his paternal grandmother would post his $50 bond. With his own mother missing and unable to make bail, he remained in the Tombs.

Later, in 1944 during a New York blizzard, a 14-year-old freezing Corso broke into his tutor's office for warmth, and fell asleep on a desk. He slept through the blizzard and was arrested for breaking and entering and booked into the Tombs for a second time with adults. Terrified of other inmates, he was sent to the psychiatric ward of Bellevue Hospital Center and later released.

On the eve of his 18th birthday, Corso broke into a tailor shop and stole an oversized suit to dress for a date. Police records indicate he was arrested two blocks from the shop. He spent the night in the Tombs and was arraigned the next morning as an 18-year-old with prior offenses. No longer a "youthful offender," he was given a two to three years sentence to Clinton State Prison in Dannemora, New York. Corso always has expressed a curious gratitude for Clinton making him a poet.

Gasoline, his second book of poems, is dedicated to "the angels of Clinton Prison who, in my seventeenth year, handed me, from all the cells surrounding me, books of illumination."

=== Corso at Clinton Correctional ===
While being transported to Clinton, Corso, terrified of prison and the prospect of rape, concocted a story of why he was sent there. He told hardened Clinton inmates he and two friends had devised the wild plan of taking over New York City by means of walkie-talkies, projecting a series of improbable and complex robberies. Communicating by walkie-talkie, each of the three boys took up an assigned position—one inside the store to be robbed, one outside on the street to watch for the police, and a third, Corso, the master-planner, in a small room nearby dictating the orders. According to Corso, he was in the small room giving the orders when the police came. In light of Corso's youth, his imaginative yarn earned him bemused attention at Clinton. Richard Biello, a capo, asked Corso who he was connected with, that is what New York crime family did he come from, talking such big crimes as walkie-talkie robberies. "I'm independent!" Corso shot back, hoping to keep his distance from the mob inmates. A week later, in the prison showers, Corso was grabbed by a handful of inmates, and the 18-year-old was about to be raped. Biello happened in and commented, "Corso! You don't look so independent right now." Biello waved off the would-be rapists, who were afraid of mafia reprisals.

Thus Corso fell under the protection of powerful Mafioso inmates, and became something of a mascot because he was the youngest inmate in the prison, and he was entertaining. Corso would cook the steaks and veal brought from the outside by mafia underlings in the "courts", 55-gallon-barrel barbecues and picnic tables, assigned to the influential prisoners. Clinton also had a ski run right in the middle of "the yards," and Corso learned to downhill ski and taught the mafiosi. He entertained his mobster elders as a court jester, quick with ripostes and japes. Corso would often cite the three propositions given him by a mafia capo: "1) Don't serve time, let time serve you. 2) Don't take your shoes off because with a two to three you're walking right out of here. 3) When you're in the yard talking to three guys, see four. See yourself. Dig yourself." Corso was jailed in the very cell just months before vacated by Charles "Lucky" Luciano. While imprisoned, Luciano had donated an extensive library to the prison. (Poet's Work, Poet's Play: Essays on the Practice and the Art. 2008). The cell was also equipped with a phone and self-controlled lighting as Luciano was, from prison, cooperating with the U.S. government's wartime effort, providing mafia aid in policing the New York waterfront, and later helping in Naples, Italy through his control of the Camorra. In this special cell, Corso read after lights-out thanks to a light specially positioned for Luciano to work late. Corso was encouraged to read and study by his Cosa Nostra mentors, who recognized his genius.

There, Corso began writing poetry. He studied the Greek and Roman classics, and voraciously absorbed encyclopedia and dictionary entries. He credited The Story of Civilization, Will and Ariel Durant's ground-breaking compendium of history and philosophy, for his general education and philosophical sophistication.

=== Release and return to New York City ===
In 1951, 21-year-old Gregory Corso worked in the garment center by day, and at night was a mascot yet again, this time at one of Greenwich Village's first lesbian bars, the Pony Stable Inn. The women gave Corso a table at which he wrote poetry. One night a Columbia College student, Allen Ginsberg, happened into the Pony Stable and saw Corso... "he was good looking, and wondered if he was gay, or what." Corso, who was not gay, was not uncomfortable with same-sex come-ons after his time in prison, and thought he could score a beer off Ginsberg. He showed Ginsberg some of the poems he was writing, a number of them from prison, and Ginsberg immediately recognized Corso as "spiritually gifted." One poem described a woman who sunbathed in a window bay across the street from Corso's room on 12th Street. The woman happened to be Ginsberg's erstwhile girl friend, with whom he lived in one of his rare forays into heterosexuality. Ginsberg invited Corso back to their apartment and asked the woman if she would satisfy Corso's sexual curiosity. She agreed, but Corso, still a virgin, got too nervous as she disrobed, and he ran from the apartment, struggling with his pants. Ginsberg and Corso became fast friends. All his life, Ginsberg had a sexual attraction to Corso, which remained unrequited.

Corso joined the Beat circle and was adopted by its co-leaders, Jack Kerouac and Allen Ginsberg, who saw in the young street-wise writer a potential for expressing the poetic insights of a generation wholly separate from those preceding it. At this time he developed a crude and fragmented mastery of Shelley, Marlowe, and Chatterton. Shelley's A Defence of Poetry (1821, posthumously published in 1840), with its emphasis on the ability of genuine poetic impulse to stimulate "unapprehended combinations of thought" that led to the "moral improvement of man," prompted Corso to develop a theory of poetry roughly consistent with that of the developing principles of the Beat poets. For Corso, poetry became a vehicle for change, a way to redirect the course of society by stimulating individual will. He referred to Shelley often as a "Revolutionary of Spirit", which he considered Ginsberg and himself to be.

=== Cambridge, Massachusetts ===
In 1954, Corso moved to Cambridge, Massachusetts, where several important poets, including Edward Marshall (poet) and John Wieners, were experimenting with the poetics of voice. The center for Corso's life there was not "the School of Boston," as these poets were called, but Harvard University's Widener Library. He spent his days there reading the great works of poetry and also auditing classes in the Greek and Roman Classics. Corso's appreciation of the classics had come from the Durants' books that he had read in prison. At Harvard, he considered becoming a classics scholar. Corso, penniless, lived on a dorm room floor in Eliot House, welcomed by students Peter Sourian, Bobby Sedgwick (brother of Edie), and Paul Grand. He would dress up for dinner and not be noticed. Members of the elite Porcellian Club reported Corso to the Harvard administration as an interloper. Dean Archibald MacLeish met with Corso intending to expel him, but Corso was offered a challenge instead to write a play based on Greek myths in exchange to stay the rest of the semester at Eliot House, and after finishing overnight the one-act play called Sarpedon, MacLeish relented and allowed Corso to be a non-matriculating student—a poet in residence. Corso's first published poems appeared in the Harvard Advocate in 1954, and his play In This Hung-up Age—concerning a group of Americans who, after their bus breaks down midway across the continent, are trampled by buffalo—was performed by the esteemed Poets' Theater the following year along with T.S. Eliot's "Murder in the Cathedral."

Harvard and Radcliffe students, notably Grand, Sourian and Sedgwick, underwrote the printing expenses of Corso's first book, The Vestal Lady on Brattle, and Other Poems. The poems featured in the volume are usually considered apprentice work heavily indebted to Corso's reading. They are, however, unique in their innovative use of jazz rhythms—most notably in "Requiem for 'Bird' Parker, musician," which many call the strongest poem in the book—cadences of spoken English, and hipster jargon. Corso once explained his use of rhythm and meter in an interview with Gavin Selerie for Riverside Interviews: "My music is built in—it's already natural. I don't play with the meter." In other words, Corso believed the meter must arise naturally from the poet's voice; it is never consciously chosen.

In a review of The Vestal Lady on Brattle for Poetry, Reuel Denney asked whether "a small group jargon" such as bop language would "sound interesting" to those who were not part of that culture. Corso, he concluded, "cannot balance the richness of the bebop group jargon... with the clarity he needs to make his work meaningful to a wider-than-clique audience." Ironically, within a few years, that "small group jargon", the Beat lingo, became a national idiom, featuring words such as "man," "cool," "dig," "chick," "hung up," etc.

Despite Corso's reliance on traditional forms and archaic diction, he remained a street-wise poet, described by Bruce Cook in The Beat Generation as "an urchin Shelley." Biographer Carolyn Gaiser suggested that Corso adopted "the mask of the sophisticated child whose every display of mad spontaneity and bizarre perception is consciously and effectively designed"—as if he is in some way deceiving his audience. But the poems at their best are controlled by an authentic, distinctive, and enormously effective voice that can range from sentimental affection and pathos to exuberance and dadaist irreverence toward almost anything except poetry itself. Marian Janssen, in her biography of Isabella Gardner, details the relationships that Corso established with the more traditional literary society at the onset of his career. During his time at Cambridge, Corso met Robert Gardner, a member of the elite upper class “Boston Brahmins.” Gardner became a sponsor of sorts to Corso and briefly provided him with financial support. It was Robert Gardner who suggested to Corso that he send one of his poems to his sister, Isabella, who was a noted poet and the assistant editor of Poetry Magazine. Isabella liked the poem and asked Corso to send her three or four more before she took the poems to the editor, Karl Shapiro. Shapiro rejected Corso's poetry and he never appeared in Poetry Magazine while Shapiro was the editor. Gardener sent a letter back to Corso that managed to “salve his poetic pride” and began a lasting but difficult correspondence between the two poets.

=== San Francisco, "Howl", and the Beat Phenomenon ===
Corso and Ginsberg decided to head to San Francisco, separately. Corso wound up temporarily in Los Angeles and worked at the L.A. Examiner news morgue. Ginsberg was delayed in Denver. They were drawn by reports of an iconoclast circle of poets, including Gary Snyder, Lawrence Ferlinghetti, Michael McClure, Philip Whalen and Lew Welch. An older literary mentor, the socialist writer Kenneth Rexroth, lent his apartment as a Friday-night literary salon (Ginsberg's mentor William Carlos Williams, an old friend of Rexroth's, had given him an introductory letter).

Wally Hedrick wanted to organize the famous Six Gallery reading, and Ginsberg wanted Rexroth to serve as master of ceremonies, in a sense to bridge generations. Philip Lamantia, Michael McClure, Philip Whalen, Allen Ginsberg and Gary Snyder read on October 7, 1955, before 100 people (including Kerouac, up from Mexico City). Lamantia read poems of his late friend John Hoffman. At his first public reading Ginsberg performed the just-finished first part of "Howl." Gregory Corso arrived late the next day, missing the historic reading, at which he had been scheduled to read.

The Six Gallery was a success, and the evening led to many more readings by the now locally famous Six Gallery poets. It was also a marker of the beginning of the West Coast Beat movement, since the 1956 publication of Howl (City Lights Pocket Poets, no. 4) and its obscenity trial in 1957 brought it to nationwide attention.

Ginsberg and Corso hitchhiked from San Francisco, visiting Henry Miller in Big Sur, and stopped off in Los Angeles. As guests of Anaïs Nin and writer Lawrence Lipton, Corso and Ginsberg gave a reading to a gathering of L.A. literati. Ginsberg took the audience off-guard, by proclaiming himself and Corso as poets of absolute honesty, and they both proceeded to strip bare naked of clothes, shocking even the most avant-garde of the audience.

Corso and Ginsberg then hitchhiked to Mexico City to visit Kerouac who was holed up in a room above a whorehouse, writing a novel, "Tristessa." After a three-week stay in Mexico City, Ginsberg left, and Corso waited for a plane ticket. His lover, Hope Savage, convinced her father, Henry Savage Jr., the mayor of Camden, S.C., to send Corso a plane ticket to Washington, D.C. Corso had been invited by the Library of Congress poet (precursor to U.S. Poet Laureate) Randall Jarrell and his wife Mary, to live with them, and become Jarrell's poetic protege. Jarrell, unimpressed with the other Beats, found Corso's work to be original and believed he held great promise. Corso stayed with the Jarrells for two months, enjoying the first taste of family life ever. However, Kerouac showed up and crashed at the Jarrells', often drunk and loud, and got Corso to carouse with him. Corso was disinvited by the Jarrells and returned to New York.

== To Paris and the "Beat Hotel" ==
In 1957, Allen Ginsberg traveled with Peter Orlovsky to visit William S. Burroughs in Morocco. They were joined by Kerouac, who was researching the French origins of his family. Corso, already in Europe, joined them in Tangiers and, as a group, they made an ill-fated attempt to take Burroughs' fragmented writings and organize them into a text (which later would become Naked Lunch). Burroughs was strung out on heroin and became jealous of Ginsberg's unrequited attraction for Corso, who left Tangiers for Paris. In Paris, Corso introduced Ginsberg and Orlovsky to a Left Bank lodging house above a bar at 9 rue Gît-le-Cœur, that he named the Beat Hotel. They were soon joined by William Burroughs and others. It was a haven for young expatriate painters, writers, and musicians. There, Ginsberg began his epic poem Kaddish, Corso composed his poems Bomb and Marriage, and Burroughs (with Brion Gysin's help) put together Naked Lunch from previous writings. This period was documented by the photographer Harold Chapman, who moved in at about the same time, and took pictures of the residents of the hotel until it closed in 1963.

Corso's Paris sojourn resulted in his third volume of poetry, The Happy Birthday of Death (1960), Minutes to Go (1960, visual poetry deemed "cut-ups") with William S. Burroughs, Sinclair Beiles, and Brion Gysin, The American Express (1961, an Olympia Press novel), and Long Live Man (1962, poetry). Corso fell out with the publisher of Gasoline, Lawrence Ferlinghetti of City Lights Bookstore, who objected to "Bomb," a position Ferlinghetti later rued and for which he apologized. Corso's work found a strong reception at New Directions Publishing, founded by James Laughlin, who had heard of Corso through Harvard connections. New Directions was considered the premier publisher of poetry, with Ezra Pound, Dylan Thomas, Marianne Moore, Wallace Stevens, Thomas Merton, Denise Levertov, James Agee, and ironically, Lawrence Ferlinghetti. Corso also wrote again to Isabella Gardner while in Paris after he read her book of poems, Birthdays from the Ocean. Corso's extreme enthusiasm for her work was returned with indifference. Gardner was in the midst of an affair with Allen Tate, one of the leading members of the New Criticism, and his negative opinion of Beat poets influenced Gardner's response to Corso. While in Europe Corso searched for his lover, Hope Savage, who had disappeared from New York, saying she was headed to Paris. He visited Rome and Greece, sold encyclopedias in Germany, hung out with jazz trumpeter Chet Baker in Amsterdam, and with Ginsberg set the staid Oxford Union in turmoil with his reading of "Bomb," which the Oxford students mistakenly believed was pro-nuclear war (as had Ferlinghetti), while they and other campuses were engaged in "ban the bomb" demonstrations. A student threw a shoe at Corso, and both he and Ginsberg left before Ginsberg could read "Howl."

Corso returned to New York in 1958, amazed that he and his compatriots had become famous, or notorious, emerging literary figures.

== Return to New York – The "Beatniks" ==
In late 1958, Corso reunited with Ginsberg and Orlovsky. They were astonished that before they left for Europe they had sparked a social movement, which San Francisco columnist Herb Caen called "Beat-nik," combining "beat" with the Russian "Sputnik," as if to suggest that the Beat writers were both "out there" and vaguely Communist.

San Francisco's obscenity trial of Lawrence Ferlinghetti for publishing Ginsberg's "Howl" had ended in an acquittal, and the national notoriety made "The Beats" famous, adored and ridiculed.

Upon their return, Ginsberg, Corso, Kerouac and Burroughs were published in the venerable Chicago Review, but before the volume was sold, University of Chicago President Robert Hutchins deemed it pornographic and had all copies confiscated. The Chicago editors promptly resigned and started an alternative literary magazine, Big Table. Ginsberg and Corso took a bus from New York for the Big Table launch, which again propelled them into the national spotlight. Studs Terkel's interview of the two was a madcap romp which set off a wave of publicity. Controversy followed them and they relished making the most of their outlaw and pariah image. Time and Life magazines had a particular dislike of the two, hurling invective and insult that Corso and Ginsberg hoped they could bootstrap into yet more publicity. The Beat Generation (so named by Kerouac) was galvanized and young people began dressing with berets, toreador pants, and beards, and carrying bongos. Corso would quip that he never grew a beard, didn't own a beret, and couldn't fathom bongos.

Corso and Ginsberg traveled widely to college campuses, reading together. Ginsberg's "Howl" provided the serious fare and Corso's "Bomb" and "Marriage" provided the humor and bonhomie. New York's Beat scene erupted and spilled over to the burgeoning folk music craze in the Village, Corso's and Ginsberg's home ground. An early participant was a newly arrived Bob Dylan: "I came out of the wilderness and just fell in with the Beat scene, the Bohemian, the Be Bop crowd. It was all pretty connected." "It was Jack Kerouac, Ginsberg, Corso, Ferlinghetti... I got in at the tail end of that and it was magic." -Bob Dylan in America.

Corso also published in the avant garde little magazine Nomad at the beginning of the 1960s.

During the early 1960s, Corso married Sally November, an English teacher who grew up in Cleveland, Ohio and attended Shaker High School, and graduated from the University of Michigan. At first, Corso mimicked "Marriage" and moved to Cleveland to work in Sally's father's florist shop. Then the couple lived in Manhattan and Sally was known to Allen Ginsberg, Peter Orlovsky, Larry Rivers and others in the beat circle at that time. The marriage, while a failure, did produce a child, Miranda Corso. Corso maintained contact with Sally and his daughter sporadically during his lifetime. Sally, who subsequently remarried, resides on the Upper East Side of Manhattan and has kept contact with one of the iconic females associated with the Beat movement, Hettie Jones.

Corso married two other times and had sons and a daughter.

As the Beats were supplanted in the 1960s by the Hippies and other youth movements, Corso experienced his own wilderness years. He struggled with alcohol and drugs. He later would comment that his addictions masked the pain of having been abandoned and emotionally deprived and abused. Poetry was his purest means of transcending his traumas, but substance abuse threatened his poetic output. He lived in Rome for many years, and later married in Paris and taught in Greece, all the while traveling widely. He strangely remained close to the Catholic Church as critic and had a loose identification as a lapsed Catholic. His collection Dear Fathers was several letters commenting on needed reforms in the Vatican.

In 1969, Corso published a volume, Elegiac Feelings American, whose lead poem, dedicated to the recently deceased Jack Kerouac, is regarded by some critics as Corso's best poem. In 1981 he published poems mostly written while residing in Europe, entitled Herald of the Autochthonic Spirit. In 1972, Rose Holton and her sister met Corso on the second day of their residence at the Hotel Chelsea in New York City:

He sold us on the Chelsea and sold us on himself. Everything that life can throw at you was reflected in his very being. It was impossible for him to be boring. He was outrageous, always provocative, alternately full of indignation or humor, never censoring his words or behavior. But the main thing is that Gregory was authentic. He could play to the audience, but he was never a phony poseur. He was the real deal. He once explained the trajectory of creative achievement: 'There is talent, there is genius, then there is the divine.' Gregory inhabited the divine.

While living at the Chelsea, Corso encountered Isabella Gardner once again. She had moved there after her relationship with Tate ended. In one of the most curious events of his life, Corso blamed her for his lack of writing as his career progressed. He claimed that Gardner had stolen two suitcases from him while they were both at the Chelsea. Corso claimed that the suitcases contained two books of new poetry and all his correspondence between himself and the other Beat poets. Although his claims were clearly false, he valued the suitcases at two thousand dollars and extorted this money from Gardner.

== Poetry ==
Corso's first volume of poetry The Vestal Lady on Brattle was published in 1955 (with the assistance of students at Harvard, where he had been auditing classes). Corso was the second member of the Beats to be published, despite the fact that he was the youngest member of the group. (Jack Kerouac's The Town and the City was published in February 1950.) His poems were first published in the Harvard Advocate. In 1958, Corso had an expanded collection of poems published as number 8 in the City Lights Pocket Poets Series: Gasoline & The Vestal Lady on Brattle. Corso's notable poems include the following: "Bomb,""Elegiac Feelings American," "Marriage," and "The Whole Mess... Almost."

=== Marriage ===
"Marriage" (1960) is perhaps Corso's signature poem. It is a 111-line work that lacks a consistent narrative thread. Instead, it offers a rambling debate about the advantages and disadvantages of marriage. It employs a free verse style, with no set meter, no set rhyme scheme, and varying line lengths. Corso acknowledges the length of some of the lines, but argues "they just flow, like a musical thing within me." "Marriage" was among his "title poems," along with "Power," "Army," and others that explore a concept. "Should I get married?" (1), the speaker begins. Could marriage bring about the results that the speaker is looking for? Coming "home to her" (54) and sitting "by the fireplace and she in the kitchen/aproned young and lovely wanting my baby/ and so happy about me she burns the roast beef" (55–57). Idealizing marriage and fatherhood initially, Corso's speaker embraces reality in the second half of the poem admitting, "No, I doubt I'd be that kind of father" (84). Recognizing that the act of marriage is in itself a form of imprisonment, "No, can't imagine myself married to that pleasant prison dream" (103), Corso's speaker acknowledges in the end that the possibility of marriage is not promising for him. Bruce Cook, in The Beat Generation illuminates Corso's skill at juxtaposing humor and serious critical commentary: "Yet as funny and entertaining as all this certainly is, it is not merely that, for in its zany way 'Marriage' offers serious criticism of what is phony about a sacred American institution."

"Marriage" excerpt:

Should I get married? Should I be good?
Astound the girl next door with my velvet suit and faustus hood?
Don't take her to movies but to cemeteries
tell all about werewolf bathtubs and forked clarinets
then desire her and kiss her and all the preliminaries
and she going just so far and I understanding why
not getting angry saying You must feel! It's beautiful to feel!
Instead take her in my arms lean against an old crooked tombstone
and woo her the entire night the constellations in the sky—
When she introduces me to her parents
back straightened, hair finally combed, strangled by a tie,
should I sit knees together on their 3rd degree sofa
and not ask Where's the bathroom?
How else to feel other than I am,
often thinking Flash Gordon soap—
O how terrible it must be for a young man
seated before a family and the family thinking
We never saw him before! He wants our Mary Lou!
After tea and homemade cookies they ask What do you do for a living?
Should I tell them? Would they like me then?
Say All right get married, we're not losing a daughter
but we're gaining a son—
And should I then ask Where's the bathroom?
O God, and the wedding! All her family and her friends
and only a handful of mine all scroungy and bearded
just wait to get at the drinks and food—

Corso's sometimes surreal word mash-ups in the poem—"forked clarinets," "Flash Gordon soap," "werewolf bathtubs"—caught the attention of many. Ethan Hawke recited the poem in the 1994 film Reality Bites, and Corso later thanked Hawke for the resulting royalty check.

=== Bomb ===
According to Catharine Seigel, Corso's "Bomb" (published in 1958), was one of the earliest poems to confront the existence of the nuclear bomb. The poem was published as a multiple-paged broadside, with the text shaped as a mushroom cloud. The first 30 lines create a round mushroom top, while lines 30-190 create the pillar of debris and destruction rising up from the ground. Corso recalled the tradition of patterned or shape poetry, but made the irreverent choice to create the shape of the cloud that results from the detonation of a nuclear bomb. Previous uses of shape poetry include angel wings and altars, which Siegel says makes Corso's choice "ironically appropriate." The poem appeared in the volume "The Happy Birthday of Death," which featured a black and white photograph of the mushroom cloud over Hiroshima, Japan.

Corso makes extensive use of onomatopoeia toward the end of the poem, with all-caps font exclaiming "BOOM BOOM BOOM BOOM BOOM" (166). Siegel describes these interruptions as "attempting to sound the reign of a nuclear, apocalyptic chaos." According to Corso himself, "When it's read, it's a sound poem. "Bomb" was controversial because it mixed humor and politics. The poem was initially misinterpreted by many as being supportive of nuclear war. The opening lines of the poem tend to lead the reader to believe that Corso supported the bomb. He writes, "You Bomb /Toy of universe Grandest of all snatched-sky I cannot hate you [extra spaces Corso's]" (lines 2–3). The speaker goes on to state that he cannot hate the bomb just as he cannot hate other instruments of violence, such as clubs, daggers, and St. Michael's burning sword. He continues on to point out that people would rather die by any other means including the electric chair, but death is death no matter how it happens. The poem moves on to other death imagery and at time becomes a prayer to the bomb. The speaker offers to bring mythological roses, a gesture that evokes an image of a suitor at the door. The other suitors courting the bomb include Oppenheimer and Einstein, scientists who are responsible for the creation of the bomb. He concludes the poem with the idea that more bombs will be made "and they'll sit plunk on earth's grumpy empires/ fierce with moustaches of gold" (lines 87–8).

Christine Hoff Kraemer states the idea succinctly, "The bomb is a reality; death is a reality, and for Corso, the only reasonable reaction is to embrace, celebrate, and laugh with the resulting chaos" ("The Brake of Time: Corso's Bomb as Postmodern God(dess)"). Kraemer also asserts, "Corso gives the reader only one clue to interpreting this mishmash of images: the association of disparate objects is always presented in conjunction with the exploding bomb" ("The Brake of Time: Corso's Bomb as Postmodern God(dess)"). In addition she points to Corso's denial that the poem contained political significance. Instead, he describes the poem as a "death shot" that pokes fun at the preoccupation with death by bomb in the 1950s when death by other causes is much more likely. This irreverent, humorous approach is characteristic of the Beat movement.

"Bomb" and "Marriage" caught the eye of a young Bob Dylan, still in Minnesota. Dylan said, "The Gregory Corso poem 'Bomb' was more to the point and touched the spirit of the times better—a wasted world and totally mechanized—a lot of hustle and bustle—a lot of shelves to clean, boxes to stack. I wasn't going to pin my hopes on that."

=== Corso in other poetry ===
In contrast to Corso's use of marriage as a synecdoche for a Beat view of women, postmodern feminist poet Hedwig Gorski chronicles a night with Corso in her poem "Could not get Gregory Corso out of my Car" (1985, Austin, Texas) showing the womanizing typical for heterosexual Beat behavior. Gorski criticizes the Beat movement for tokenism towards women writers and their work, with very few exceptions, including Anne Waldman, and post-beats like Diane DiPrima and herself. Male domination and womanizing by its heterosexual members, along with tokenism by its major homosexual members characterize the Beat Literary Movement. Beats scoffed at the Feminist Movement which offered liberalizing social and professional views of women and their works as did the Beat Movement for men, especially homosexuals. Corso however always defended women's role in the Beat Generation, often citing his lover, Hope Savage, as a primary influence on him and Allen Ginsberg.

=== Relationship with the Beat Movement ===
The battle against social conformity and literary tradition was central to the work of the Beats. This group of poets questioned mainstream politics and culture, and they were concerned with changing consciousness and defying conventional writing. Corso's poems "Marriage" and "Bomb" demonstrate his willingness to provide an unconventional, humorous, and irreverent perspective on serious or controversial topics.

Ted Morgan described Corso's place in the Beat literary world: "If Ginsberg, Kerouac and Burroughs were the Three Musketeers of the movement, Corso was their D'Artagnan, a sort of junior partner, accepted and appreciated, but with less than complete parity. He had not been in at the start, which was the alliance of the Columbia intellectuals with the Times Square hipsters. He was a recent adherent, although his credentials were impressive enough to gain him unrestricted admittance ..." It has taken 50 years and the death of the other Beats, for Corso to be fully appreciated as a poet of equal stature and significance.

== Later years ==
In later years, Corso disliked public appearances and became irritated with his own "Beat" celebrity. He never allowed a biographer to work in any "authorized" fashion, and only posthumously was a volume of letters published under the specious artifice of An Accidental Autobiography. He did, however, agree to allow filmmaker Gustave Reininger to make a cinema vérité documentary, Corso: The Last Beat, about him.

Corso had a cameo appearance in The Godfather Part III where he plays an outraged stockholder trying to speak at a meeting.

After Allen Ginsberg's death, Corso was depressed and despondent. Gustave Reininger convinced him to go "on the road" to Europe and retrace the early days of "the Beats" in Paris, Italy and Greece. While in Venice, Corso expressed on film his lifelong concerns about not having a mother and living such an uprooted childhood. Corso became curious about where in Italy his mother, Michelina Colonna, might be buried. His father's family had always told him that his mother had returned to Italy a disgraced woman, a whore. Filmmaker Gustave Reininger quietly launched a search for Corso's mother's Italian burial place. In an astonishing turn of events, Reininger found Corso's mother Michelina not dead, but alive; and not in Italy, but in Trenton, New Jersey. Corso was reunited with his mother on film. He discovered that she at the age of 17 had been almost fatally brutalized (all her front teeth punched out) and was sexually abused by her teenage husband, his father. On film, Michelina explained that, at the height of the Depression, with no trade or job, she had no choice but to give her son into the care of Catholic Charities. After she had established a new life working in a restaurant in New Jersey, she had attempted to find him, to no avail. The father, Sam Corso, had blocked even Catholic Charities from disclosing the boy's whereabouts. Living modestly, she lacked the means to hire a lawyer to find her son. She worked as a waitress in a sandwich shop in the New Jersey State Office Building in Trenton. She eventually married the cook, Paul Davita, and started a new family. Her child Gregory remained a secret between Michelina and her mother and sisters, until Reininger found them.

Corso and his mother quickly developed a relationship which lasted until his death, which preceded hers. They both spent hours on the phone, and the initial forgiveness displayed in the film became a living reality. Corso and Michelina loved to gamble and on several occasions took vacations to Atlantic City for blackjack at the casinos. Corso always lost, while Michelina fared better and would stake him with her winnings.

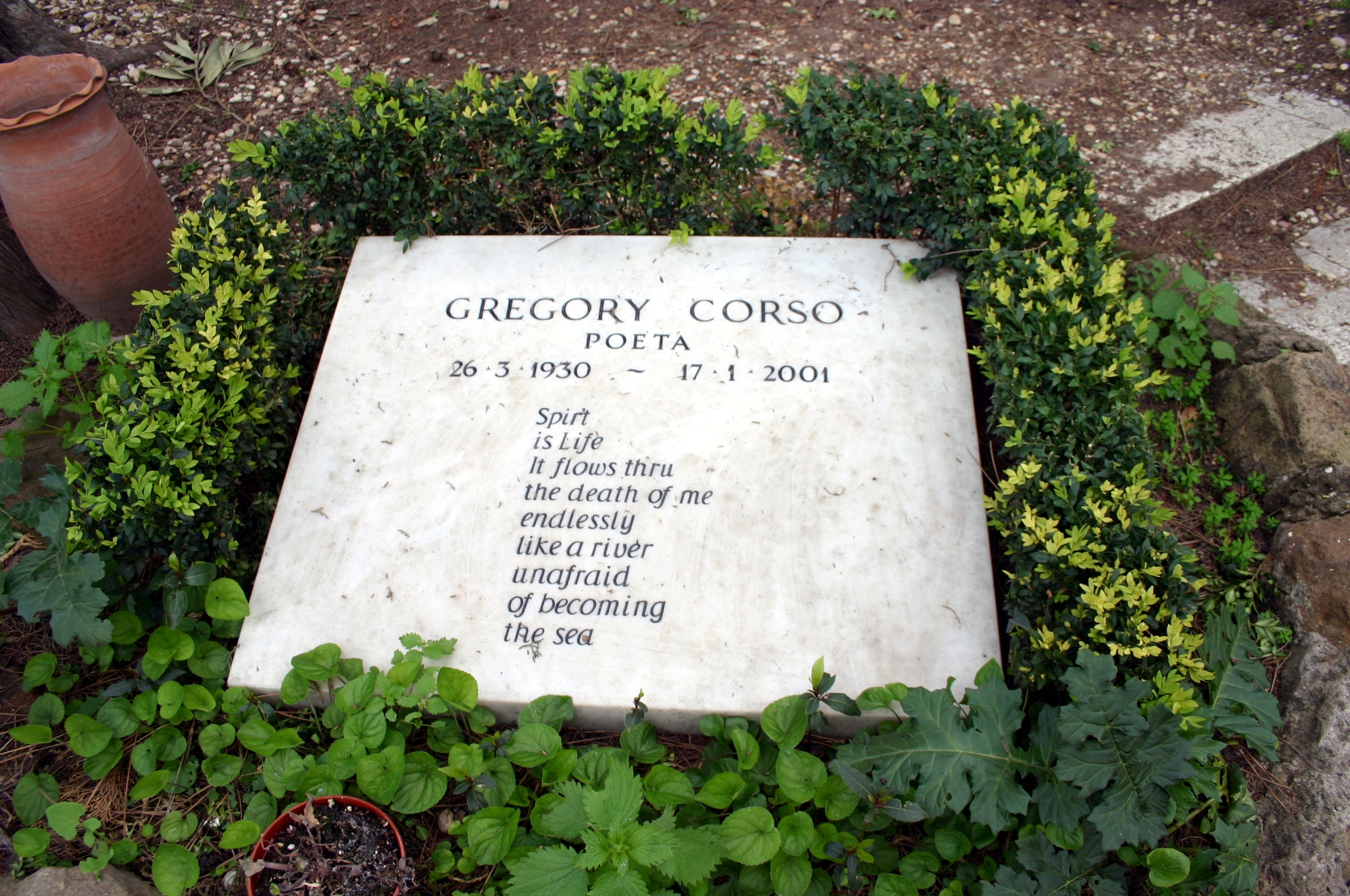
Corso's grave, in Rome (Italy)

Corso claimed that he was healed in many ways by meeting his mother and saw his life coming full circle. He began to work productively on a new, long-delayed volume of poetry, The Golden Dot. Shortly thereafter, Corso discovered he had irreversible prostate cancer. He died of the disease in Minnesota on January 17, 2001. Around two hundred people were present in the "Non-Catholic Cemetery" in Rome, Italy, on Saturday morning, May 5, to pay their last respects to Gregory Corso. In the tranquility of this small and lovely cemetery full of trees, flowers and well-fed cats, with the sun's complicity, more than a funeral, it seemed to be a reunion of long-lost friends, with tales, anecdotes, laughter and poetry readings. The urn bearing Corso's ashes arrived with his daughter Sheri Langerman who had assisted him during the last seven months of his life. Twelve other Americans came with her, among them Corso's old friends Roger Richards and the lawyer Robert Yarra. The cemetery had been closed to newcomers since the mid-century and Robert Yarra and Hannelore deLellis made it possible for Corso to be buried there. His ashes were deposited at the foot of the grave of poet Percy Bysshe Shelley in the Cimitero Acattolico, and not far from John Keats. He wrote his own epitaph:

Spir't
is Life
It flows thru
the death of me
endlessly
like a river
unafraid
of becoming
the sea

== Posthumous ==
In 2017 the international quarterly Four by Two magazine, in collaboration with Raymond Foye, ran a series of previously unpublished poems by Corso, one of them handwritten and accompanied by small paintings, as well as two postcards of his watercolors portraying William Burroughs and Edgar Allan Poe.

== Filmography ==
- Pull My Daisy (1959)
- Me and My Brother (1969)
- What Happened to Kerouac? (1986)
- The Godfather Part III (1990) – Unruly Stockholder
- What About Me (1993) – Hotel Desk Clerk (final film role)
- Corso: The Last Beat (2009)

== Bibliography ==
- The Vestal Lady and Other Poems (1955, poetry)
- This Hung-Up Age (1955, play)
- Gasoline (1958, poetry)
- Bomb (1958, poetry)
- The Happy Birthday of Death (1960, poetry)
- Minutes to Go (1960, visual poetry) with Sinclair Beiles, William S. Burroughs, and Brion Gysin.
- The American Express (1961, novel)
- Long Live Man (1962, poetry)
- There is Yet Time to Run Back through Life and Expiate All That's been Sadly Done (1965, poetry)
- Elegiac Feelings American (1970, poetry)
- The Night Last Night was at its Nightest (1972, poetry)
- Earth Egg (1974, poetry)
- Writings from OX (1979, with interview by Michael Andre)
- Herald of the Autochthonic Spirit (1981, poetry)
- Mind Field (1989, poetry)
- Mindfield: New and Selected Poems (1989, poetry)
- King Of The Hill: with Nicholas Tremulis (1993, album)
- Bloody Show: with Nicholas Tremulis (1996, album)
- Brink of the World by Stephen R. Pastore and Gregory Corso (2008)
- The Whole Shot: Collected Interviews with Gregory Corso (2015)
- Sarpedon: A Play by Gregory Corso (1954) (2016)
- Melted Parchment (2019)
- Collected Plays (2021)
