= Kaddish and Other Poems =

Book of poems by Allen Ginsberg

First edition

Kaddish and Other Poems 1958-1960 (1961) is a book of poems by Allen Ginsberg published by City Lights Bookstore.

== Background ==
The lead poem "Kaddish" also known as "Kaddish for Naomi Ginsberg (1894-1956)", was written in two parts by Beat writer Allen Ginsberg, and was first published in Kaddish and Other Poems 1958-1960. The book was part of the Pocket Poet Series published by City Lights Books. In the table of contents, the poem is titled "Kaddish: Proem, narrative, hymmnn, lament, litany, & fugue". Along with Ginsberg's "Howl", Kaddish is said to be one of his greatest masterpieces.

Ginsberg wrote the poem about his mother Naomi after her death in 1956, who struggled with mental problems throughout her life. Naomi suffered many psychotic episodes both before Allen was born and while he was growing up. She went in and out of mental hospitals and was treated with medication, insulin shock therapy, and electroshock therapy. She died in an asylum in 1956.

== Kaddish in Judaism ==
The title "Kaddish" refers to the mourning prayer or blessing in Judaism. This long poem was Ginsberg's attempt to mourn his mother, Naomi, but also reflects his sense of loss at his estrangement from his born religion. The traditional Kaddish contains no references to death, whereas Ginsberg's poem is riddled with thoughts and questionings of death.

After her death, a rabbi would not allow the traditional Kaddish to be read with Ginsberg's Christian and Atheist friends, so he rebelled and wrote a Kaddish of his own. Ginsberg began writing the poem in the Beat Hotel in Paris in December 1957 and completed it in New York in 1959.

== Proposed film version ==
Ginsberg wrote a screenplay based on the poem. Robert Frank was to direct it, but money could not be raised for the project.

== Stage version ==
In 1972, Robert Kalfin adapted the screenplay for the stage and produced it at the Chelsea Theater Center at the Brooklyn Academy of Music. The play explored Naomi Ginsberg's schizophrenic collapse and made use of innovative video for flashback scenes.

There is a detailed description of this production and of behind-the-scenes incidents surrounding it in Davi Napoleon's chronicle of the Chelsea in Chelsea on the Edge: The Adventures of an American Theater (1991). The stage version was also staged at the Habima Theater in Israel, translated by Nathan Zach and starring Yoram Khatav as Allen and Gila Almagor as Naomi.

== Overview ==
=== On Naomi Ginsberg ===
Kaddish is not a linear story. Rather, it is told through a series of thoughts and memories about the character’s lives. Part I opens with Ginsberg reflecting on the passing of his mother. He writes: “Strange now to think of you, gone without corsets & eyes, while I walk on the sunny pavement of Greenwich Village,”. The poem highlights Naomi’s young life, watching Charlie Chaplin films and going to the Metropolitan Opera House. It tells of her being an immigrant from Russia, going to candy stores, eating ice cream and drinking soda. The poem also touches on her communist beliefs and general paranoid nature (“All the accumulations of life, that wear us out-clocks, bodies, consciousness, shoe, breasts-begotten sons-your Communism-‘Paranoia’ into hospitals.”).

In Part II, Ginsberg tells of the nature of Naomi’s sickness and what it meant for him to witness as a young person. The poem suggests that she often looked to him for protection because of her paranoid fantasies and often confided in him. Naomi’s paranoia consisted of her belief that someone or something was out to get her and that medical professionals wanted to kill her. There were also times when most sounds and any light terrified her. In Part II the reader also learns that Naomi’s first nervous breakdown was in 1919 and caused her to stay in a dark room for three weeks. Ginsberg does not only write about the bad times, but also the good times. The times when Naomi was doing well are explained at length and reflect the love and hope he had for his mother.

=== A Broader Meaning ===
The poem, in addition to being about Naomi Ginsberg’s life, is Allen Ginsberg’s reflection on the meaning of life and death. At many points throughout the poem, Ginsberg comments on the approach of his own death. He also talks about other members of his family and events that surrounded his life with his mother, such as the Great Depression. He relates his experiences and his mother’s sickness with the struggles of people as a whole. The poem also touches on religion and Ginsberg’s confusion and disconnect from his own religion of Judaism. It questions the importance of religious authority and authority in general.

== Structure/Poetic Devices ==
This poem is similar to Howl (1955) in that it has the same structure. Each line is quite long, and Ginsberg has said these long lines are meant to be read in a single breath. In this and many of Ginsberg’s poems, there is a sense of urgency and hyperactivity. It is as if the poem is just a collection of his memories spilled onto the page. There is no uniform structure to the poem. Some lines are indented, some are not. Ginsberg uses hyphens as punctuation often, and the sentences are often run-ons, brimming with different ideas and images.

One interesting device Ginsberg uses in this poem is capitalization. Several words like “Death”, “Day”, “Mercy” and “Oblivion”, are capitalized even though they don’t necessarily have to be. The capitalization of the words denotes their heightened importance in the poem. “Oblivion” in this poem is not just an abstraction; it is meant to describe a very real place, thus it is capitalized.
