= Jacques Charles Brunet =

French bibliographer (1780–1867)

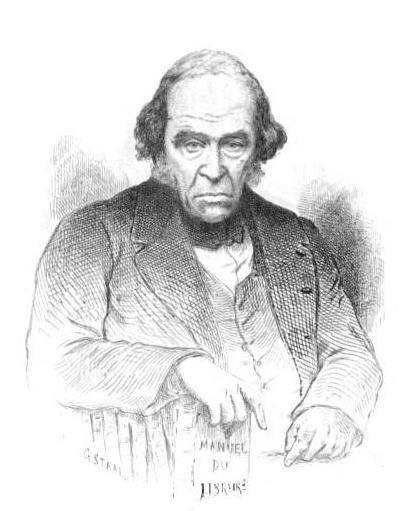
- Born: 1780; Paris, France
- Died: 1867 (aged 86–87)
- Occupation: Bibliographer
- Known for: Brunet's classification of works
- Notable work: Manuel du libraire

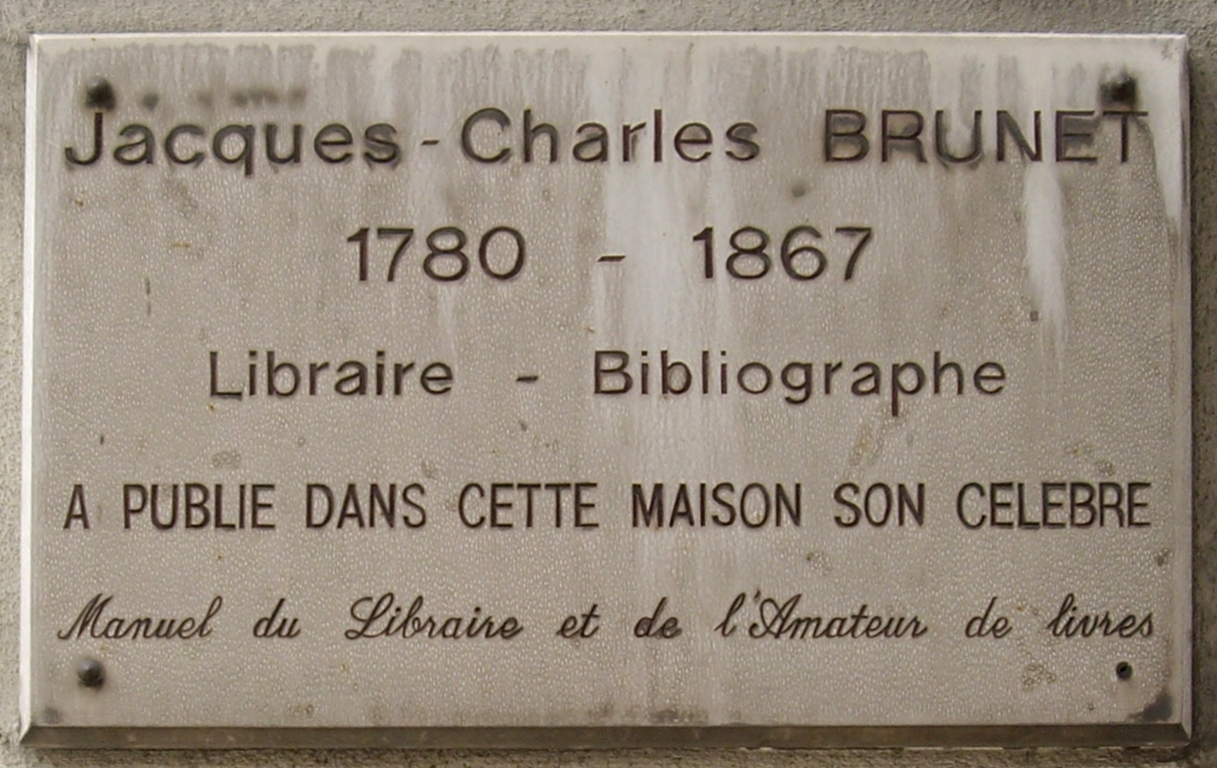
A plaque on Rue Gît-le-Cœur in the 6th arrondissement of Paris (next to Place St. Michel) marks the spot where Brunet composed his famous work.

Jacques Charles Brunet (2 November 1780 – 14 November 1867) was a French bibliographer.

== Biography ==
He was born in Paris, the son of a bookseller. He began his bibliographical career by the preparation of several auction catalogues, notable examples being that of the Comte d'Ourches (Paris, 1811) and an 1802 supplement to the 1790 Dictionnaire bibliographique de livres rares of Duclos and Cailleau. In 1810 the first edition of his bibliographical dictionary, Manuel du libraire et de l'amateur des livres (3 vols.), appeared. Brunet published successive editions of the dictionary, which rapidly came to be recognized as the first book of its class in European literature. The last of the 6 volumes of the 5th edition (1860–1865) of the Manuel du libraire contained a classified catalogue (French: Table Méthodique) in which the works are arranged in classes according to their subjects. A supplement to this edition was published (1878–1880) by P. Deschamps and G. Brunet.

Among Brunet's other works are Nouvelles Recherches bibliographiques (1834), Recherches sur les éditions originales des cinq livres du roman satirique de Rabelais (1852), and an edition of the French poems of J.G. Alione d'Asti, dating from the beginning of the 16th century (1836). Brunet has been praised as a worthy successor to Guillaume-François Debure. In 1848 he received the decoration of the Legion of Honour.

See also the notice by Antoine Le Roux de Lincy prefixed to the catalogue (1868) of his own valuable library.

== Brunet's classification of works ==
In the Manuel du libraire Brunet employed a topical classification of his own devising, used in volume 6 of his bibliography. He attributed to Aldus Manutius the first such bibliographic organization in his "Libri Greci Impressi" where the works were divided into "Grammatica, Poetica, Logica, Philosophia, Sacra Scriptura" (Grammar, Poesy, Logic, Philosophy, Sacred Scripture). Brunet also referenced the classified arrangement of Conrad Gessner's Bibliotheca universalis. Brunet's classification was cited as the inspiration for some library classifications of the 19th century.

The classification, referred to as the "French System", had five main classes:

I. Theology
II. Jurisprundence
III. Sciences and Arts
IV. Polite Literature
V. History

Each of these had subheadings. For example, Theology had, among others, Holy scriptures, Liturgy, Theologians and Singular opinions.

== Works ==
- Manuel du libraire et de l'amateur de livres, contenant 1° : un nouveau dictionnaire bibliographique... 2° : une table en forme de catalogue raisonné..., Paris : Brunet, 1810, 3 vol. in-8°.
- Nouvelles Recherches bibliographiques pour servir de supplément au Manuel du libraire et de l'amateur de livres, Paris : Silvestre, 1834, 3 vol. in-8°.
  - v.2, v.3
- Poésies françoises de J. G. Alione (d'Asti) (it)3, composées de 1494 à 1520, publiées pour la première fois en France, avec une notice biographique et bibliographique, par J.-C. Brunet, Paris : Silvestre, 1836, In-8°4
- Recherches bibliographiques et critiques sur les éditions originales des cinq livres du roman satirique de Rabelais et sur les différences de texte qui se font remarquer particulièrement dans le premier livre du "Pantagruel" et dans le "Gargantua", Paris : L. Potier, 1852, In-8°, 144 et 58 p.
- Manuel du libraire et de l'amateur de livres 4th ed. Paris : Silvestre, 1842-44.
- Manuel du libraire et de l'amateur de livres [Catalogue for Booksellers and Bibliophiles] (in French) (5th ed.), Paris: Firmin Didot frères, 1860–1865. 6 vol.; in-8 et son supplément Vol. I Vol. II Vol. III Vol. IV Vol. V Vol. VI
