= Gustave Reininger =

American screenwriter

- Gustave Reininger with Dr. Pietro Pietrini
- Born: Gustave V. Reininger; December 15, 1950
- Died: April 19, 2012 (aged 61)
- Education: St. Xavier High School
- Alma mater: University of Chicago (BA)
- Known for: Crime Story

Gustave V. Reininger (December 15, 1950 – April 19, 2012) was an American screenwriter, who was the co-creator of the NBC TV drama Crime Story. Crime Story was based on the Mafia in Chicago, or "The Outfit," and how it got off the streets and into the boardrooms of Las Vegas casinos. The show premiered with a two-hour pilot movie, which had been exhibited theatrically, and was watched by over 30 million viewers.

Reininger was a former international investment banker on Wall Street, who had caught producer Michael Mann's attention with a screenplay he wrote about arson investigators, as well as a French-language thriller starring Dennis Hopper co-written and produced by him.

== Biography ==
Reininger grew up in Lakeside Park, Kentucky, one of eight children of a sign company executive. He graduated from St. Xavier High School in Cincinnati in 1968. He graduated from University of Chicago, studying Economics and English literature. His prose was published in college literary magazines.

Reininger was an International Investment Banker with Chemical – Chase Bank, (now JP Morgan Chase.) He was on a management team supervising offshore banks, in a partnership venture with the Earl of Suffolk, John Scott-Ellis, the 9th Baron Howard de Walden. Reininger supervised banks based in Guernsey, Channel Islands; Beirut, Lebanon; Nassau, Bahamas; and Monrovia, Liberia.

At night, Reininger re-wrote scripts for producer Howard Zucker. Among them, Francis Coppola's 5th Coin, a script on Macau’s Formula One race. While working in Paris on a bank assignment, Reininger co-produced a French thriller starring Dennis Hopper called Last In – First Out. The film also starred Bruno Cremer, Henri Serre, and Joseph Cotten.

Reininger was the director-producer of the feature documentary Corso: The Last Beat about the life of beat poet Gregory Corso.

=== Crime Story ===
In a June 1986 press conference, Mann said that the first season of the show would go from Chicago in 1963 to Las Vegas in 1980. He said, "It's a serial in the sense that we have continuing stories, and in that sense the show is one big novel." Mann and Reininger's inspiration for the 1963-1980 arc came from their mutual admiration of the 15½ hour television film, Berlin Alexanderplatz, by German director Rainer Werner Fassbinder'. Mann said, "The pace of our story is like the speed of light compared to that, but that's the idea - if you put it all together at the end you've got one hell of a 22-hour movie."

NBC chief Brandon Tartikoff allowed the series to move to Las Vegas for the last quarter of the 22 episodes. The last episode is legendary as Ray Luca and Pauli Taglia are on the lam, hiding from Det. Mike Torello, in a Nevada desert shack, which is located in an atomic bomb test area. An A-Bomb explodes, presumably obliterating Luca and Taglia, in one of the most memorable cliffhangers in television history, leaving viewers wondering whether they were dead or alive, just as the show's creator were wondering if the series itself was dead or alive with NBC. Viewers were surprised to learn in the fall the series had returned to be permanently based in Las Vegas.

Reininger was subpoenaed to Anthony Spilotro's trial in Federal Court in Las Vegas as an unwilling material witness for Spilotro, who was alleging that the only way Reininger could have written scripts and the series "Bible" was by having access to Federal wiretaps of Spilotro. Reininger in turn discovered that his New York phones were being monitored. Reininger was served Spilotro's subpoena, and given a deadly warning, in a New York hotel bar by now infamous Hollywood private detective Anthony Pellicano, who in 2006 was imprisoned for illegal wiretapping, blackmail and harassment while representing notable entertainment figures.

Spilotro returned home to Chicago and was brutally murdered along with his brother Michael, and buried in an Indiana cornfield. The case was dismissed, and Reininger, who had sent all his Crime Story work materials to a former banking associate in Zurich, Switzerland, did not have to testify.
