= Rue Gît-le-Cœur =

Street in Paris, France

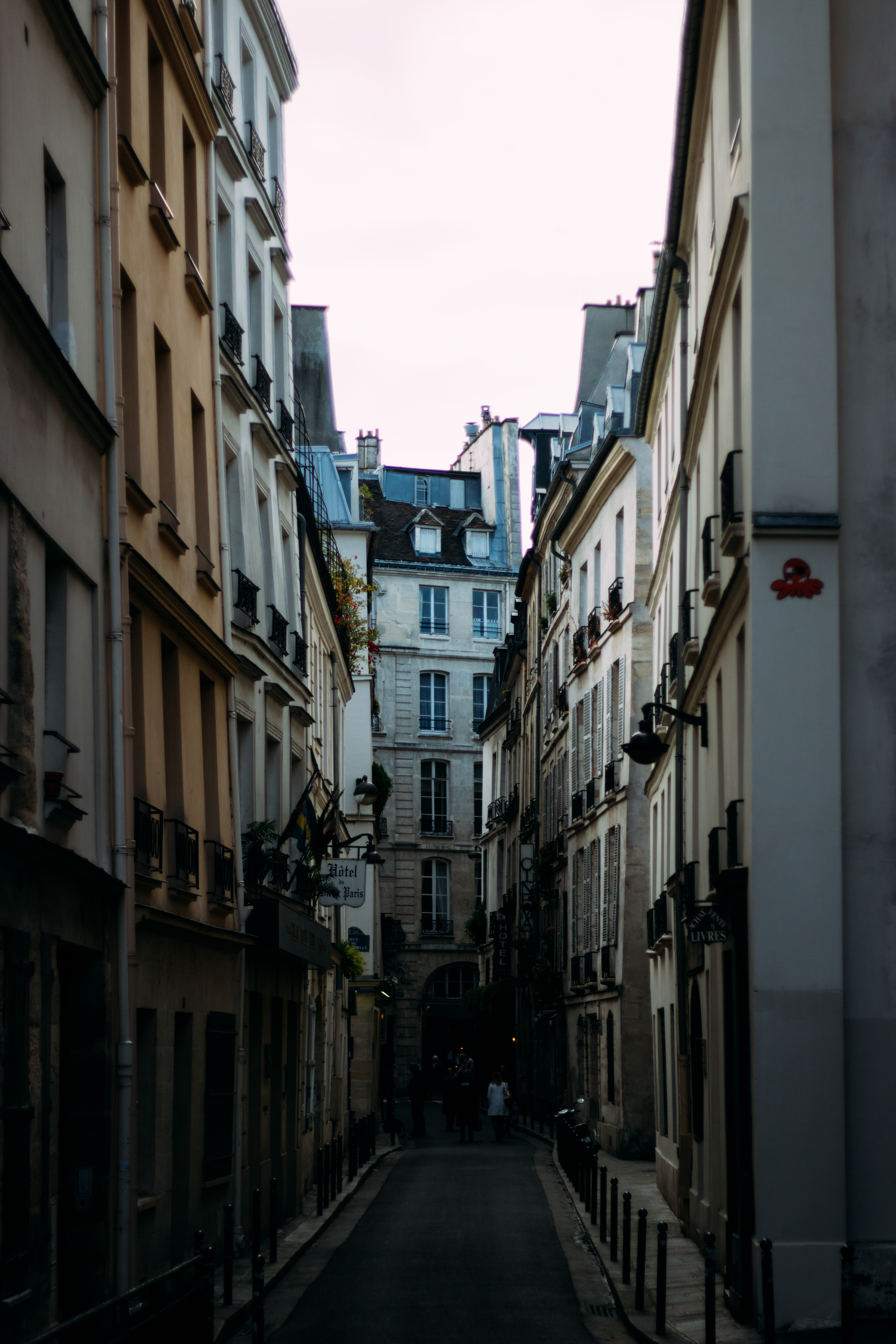

- Location within Paris
- Length: 112 m (367 ft)
- Width: 10 m (33 ft)
- Arrondissement: 6th
- Quarter: Monnaie
- Coordinates: 48°51′14″N 2°20′34″E
- From: 25 quai des Grands Augustins
- To: 30 rue Saint-André-des-Arts

The Rue Gît-le-Cœur (French pronunciation: [ʁy ʒi lə kœʁ]) is a street in the 6th arrondissement of Paris, France.

== Name ==
In the 14th century, the street was documented under the name Gilles-Queux or Gui-le-Queux, presumably referring to a cook (queux in Old French) named Giles. Later names include Gui-le-Preux, Villequeux, Gui-le-Comte, and Gilles-le-Cœur. It was also known at various points as the Rue des Noyers (1423), Rue des Deux-Moutons, and Rue du Battoir (1639).

== History ==
The street was opened around 1200 on former vineyards of Saint-Germain-des-Prés Abbey.

In 1300, a large property on the northeastern section of the street between the Rue de l'Hirondelle and what is now the quay (then the Rue du Hurepoix) was the Paris residence of the Bishop of Chartres. In 1394, it belonged to Louis de Sancerre, in 1397 to the Archbishop of Besançon, and in 1418 to Jacques de Montberon. In the second quarter of the 16th century, it was acquired and rebuilt by King Francis I for his chief mistress Anne de Pisseleu d'Heilly, who stayed there until her exile following Francis's death in 1547.

The same location then became the mansion of Pierre Séguier (1504–1580), later occupied by various members of the Séguier family. In 1641, Louis Charles d'Albert de Luynes married Louise Marie Séguier, Marquise d'O, and the property became known as the Hôtel de Luynes until its partitioning in 1671. Parts of the 1671 rebuilding are preserved in the courtyard of no. 5.

Nos. 10 and 12 are built on the former location of another prominent mansion, which in the 14th century belonged to the Counts of Artois, thus known as the Hôtel d'Arras, with main entrance at what is now no. 30 rue Saint-André-des-Arts. It was later used by Paris Bishop Gérard de Montaigu; by Thomas Montagu, 4th Earl of Salisbury, in 1422; by Louis II de Luxembourg, Bishop of Thérouanne, in 1428; and was eventually partitioned in 1535.

Most of the street's current buildings date from the late 16th to late 18th centuries. The whole street was inundated during the 1910 Great Flood of Paris.

From the 18th to late 20th centuries, the street was a hub of the Parisian bookstore business. A bookshop affiliated with the Maoist Union des jeunesses communistes marxistes-léninistes operated at no. 6 from 1967 to 1978, bankrolled by the wealthy grandmother of activist Tiennot Grumbach, and gave its name to the short-lived far-left publishing house Editions Gît-le-Cœur. A trade association of sellers of ancient books, the Syndicat de la Librairie Ancienne et Moderne, has been located at no. 4 since 1985. As of 2021, two bookstores remain in the street: Librairie Kronis at no. 4 and Un Regard Moderne at no. 10; the latter opened in 1991.

At no. 6, a fencing club (salle d'armes) opened in 1886 and still operates as of 2022, claiming to be the oldest remaining in Paris. École César Franck, a private music school, operated at no. 8 from 1968 until its closure in the 1980s.

An independent movie theater, long known as Studio Gît-le-Coeur, has operated at no. 12 since February 1967. As of 2021, the tiny street's commercial activity is mainly related to tourism, with several hotels and restaurants.

== Notable individuals ==
- Royal official Nicolas René Berryer owned no. 7 in the 18th century.
- Bibliographer Jacques-Charles Brunet lived at no. 4 and wrote there his book Manuel du libraire et de l'amateur de livres, published in 1810.
- Kléber Bénard, a member of the criminal Bonnot Gang, lived at no. 17 in 1911.
- Czech writer Vítězslav Nezval gave the street's name to a book (Ulice Gît-le-Coeur, 1936) based on his stay in Paris for the International Writers' Congress for the Defense of Culture in June 1935, in memory of the street's restaurant where he spent time with André Breton, Paul Éluard and Benjamin Péret.
- Indian yoga guru Meher Baba lived at no. 1 during a Parisian stay in 1936.
- French Caribbean writer Édouard Glissant was a regular at his friend Maurice Roche's room at no. 7, in the early 1950s.
- French graphic artist Raymond Savignac lived at no. 10 in the 1950s.
- From 1957 to 1963, several poets and artists of the Beat Generation stayed in a rundown pension at no. 9, which they nicknamed the Beat Hotel, including Sinclair Beiles, William S. Burroughs, Gregory Corso, Allen Ginsberg, Brion Gysin, Harold Norse, Peter Orlovsky, Derek Raymond, and Ian Sommerville.
- Israeli painter Hanna Ben Dov lived at no. 12 in the 1960s and 1970s.
- French author Jean-Paul Ribes ran the bookshop at no. 6 before turning away from Maoism in 1971.

== In art ==
Like other atmospheric streets of the Latin Quarter, the Rue Gît-le-Cœur has inspired works by artists including Charles Marville, Bram van Velde, and Roger Vieillard.

== Gallery ==
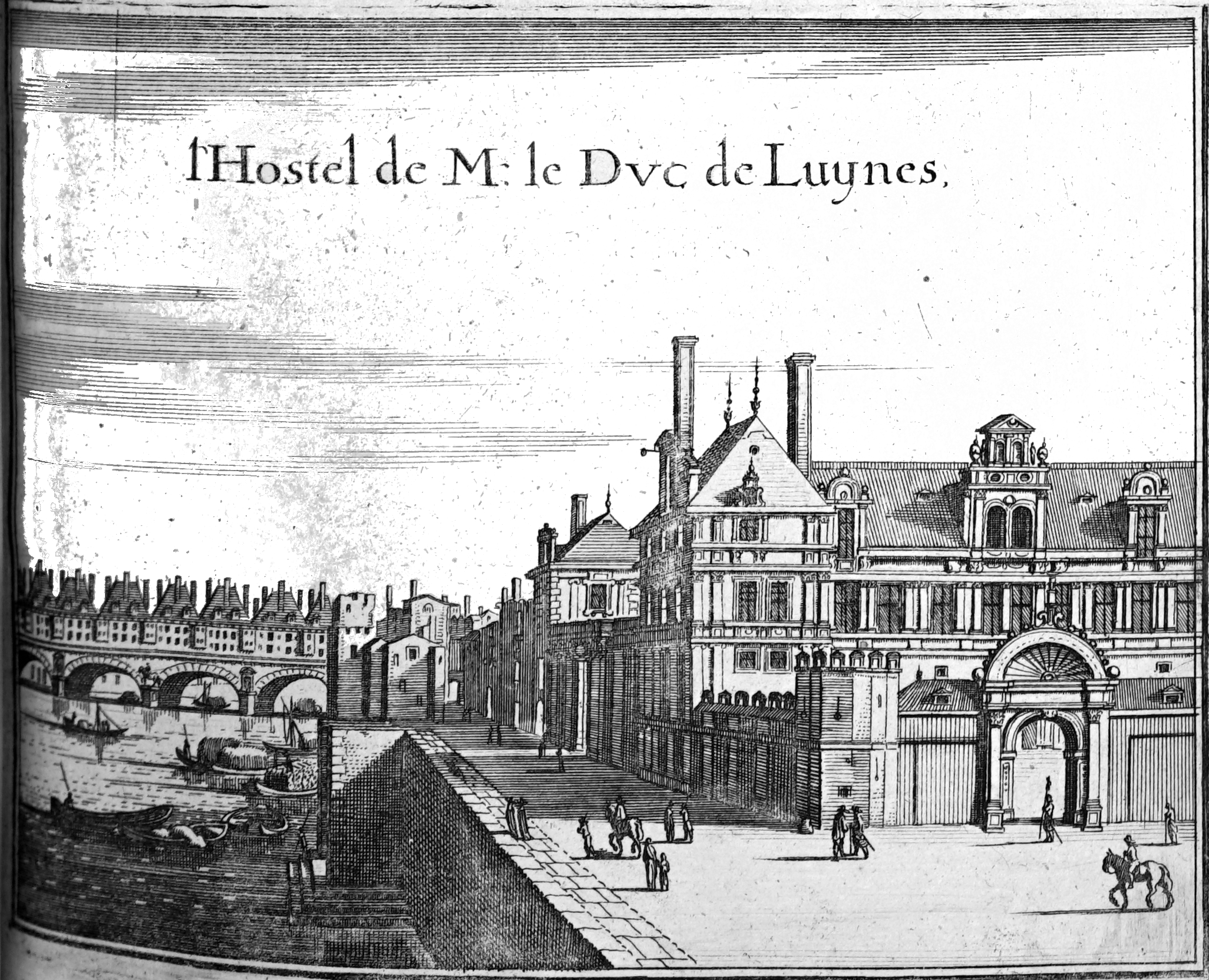
The Hotel de Luynes in 1655, engraving after Israel Silvestre

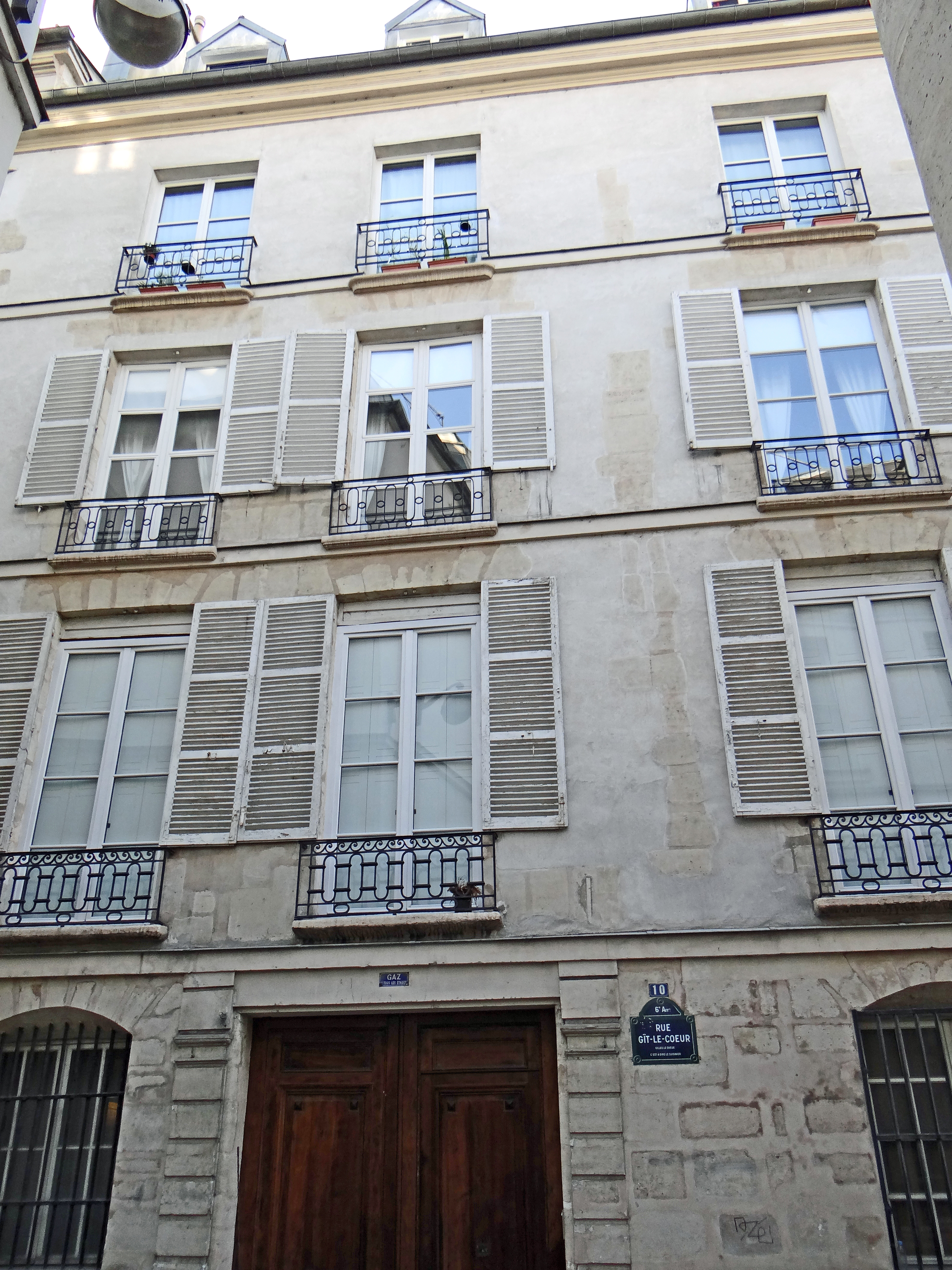
17th-century building at no. 10

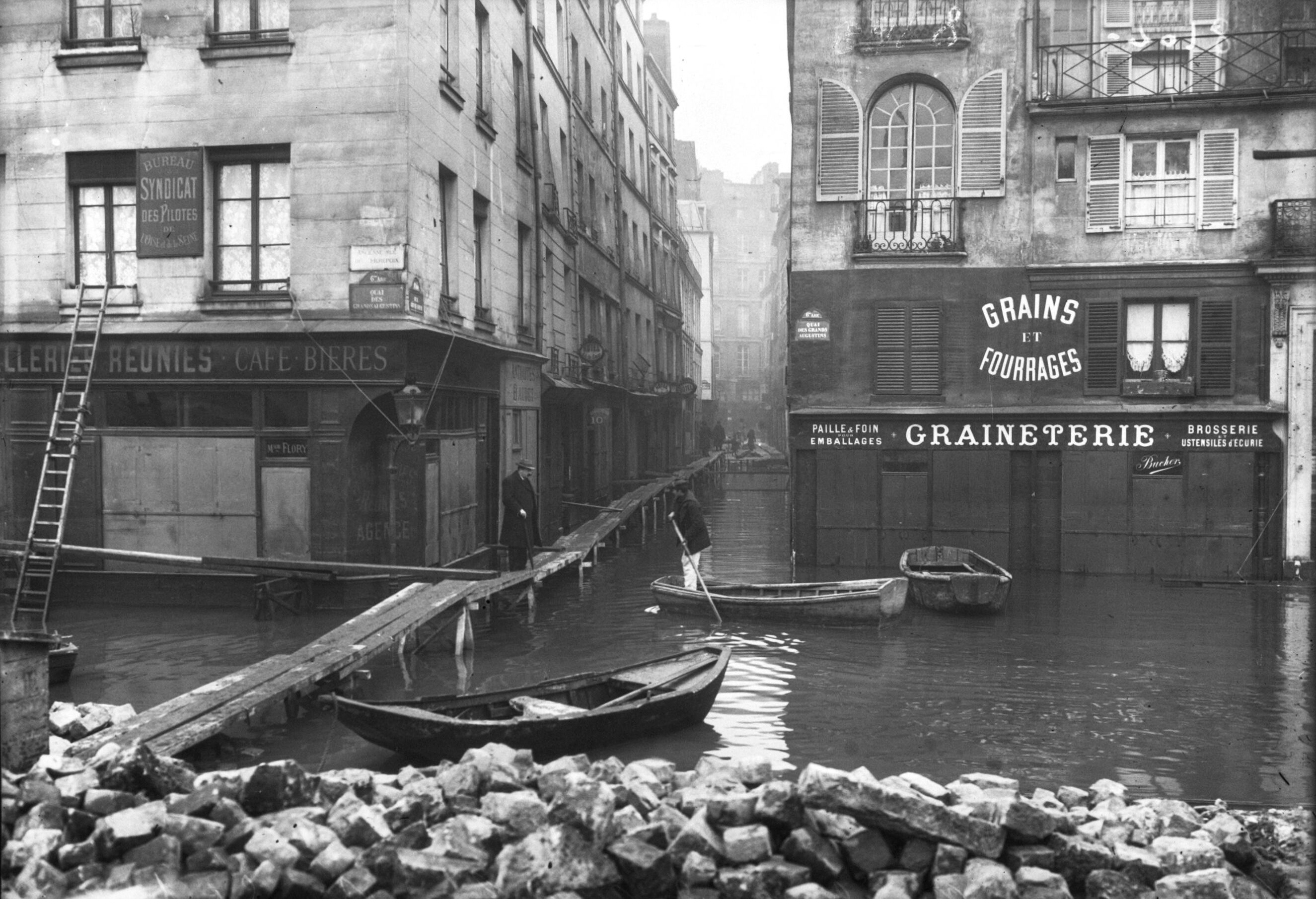
The street during the Great Flood of 1910

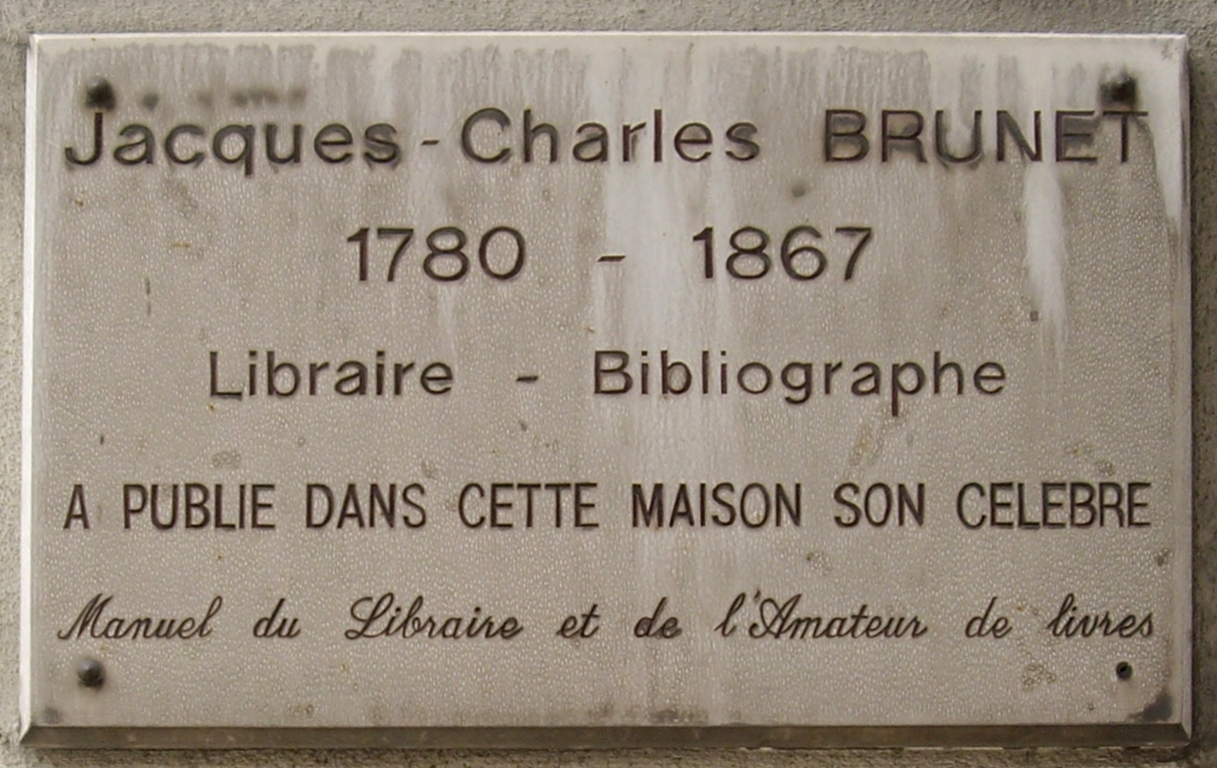
Plaque commemorating Jacques-Charles Brunet at no. 4

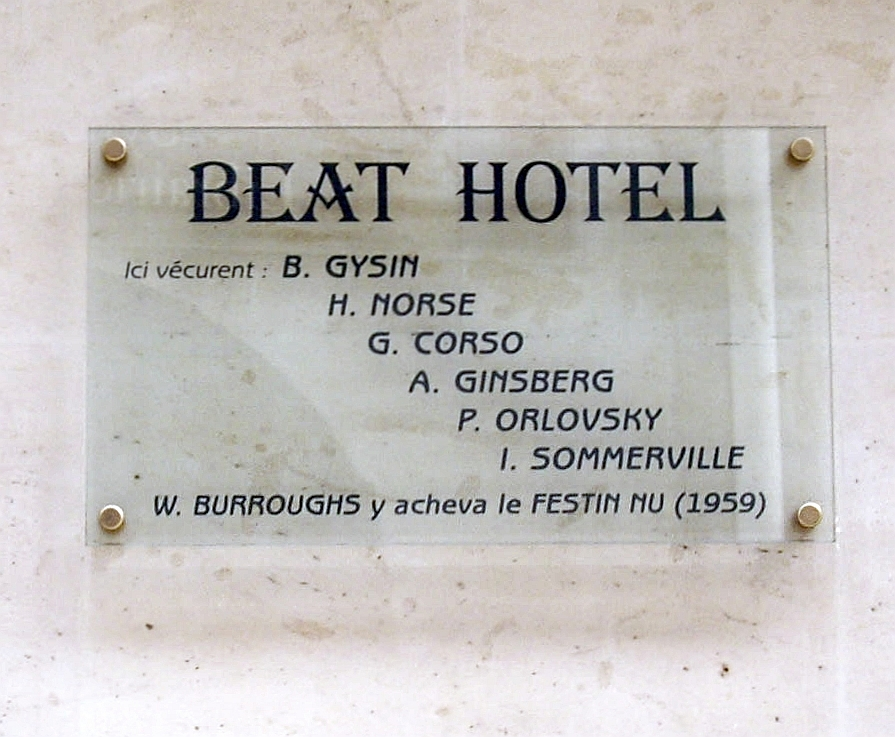
Plaque installed in 2009 at no. 9

== See also ==
- Rue des Grands-Augustins

== Access ==
Located near the Metro station: Odéon.

Located near the Metro station: Saint-Michel.
