= Harold Chapman (photographer) =

British photographer (1927–2022)

- Born: Harold Stephen Chapman; 26 March 1927; Deal, Kent, England
- Died: 19 August 2022 (aged 95)
- Occupation: Photographer

Harold Stephen Chapman (26 March 1927 – 19 August 2022) was a British photographer noted for chronicling the 1950s and 60s in Paris.

== Biography ==
Chapman was born in Deal, Kent on 26 March 1927. He produced a large body of work over many years, with his most significant period from the mid-1950s to the early 1960s, when he lived in a backstreet Left Bank guesthouse in Paris later nicknamed (by Verta Kali Smart) ‘the Beat Hotel’. There he chronicled in detail the life and times of his fellow residents – among them Allen Ginsberg and Allen's lover Peter Orlovsky, William S. Burroughs, Gregory Corso, Sinclair Beiles, Brion Gysin, Harold Norse, and other great names of Beat Generation poetry and art. When the Beat Hotel closed its doors in 1964, Chapman was the last guest to leave. The collection of photographs he had taken there provide an artistic and historic record, and became the mainstay of his reputation.

Chapman's other works attract worldwide attention, and include portraits, landscapes, bizarre objets trouvés and, especially, distinctive enigmatic street scenes (often involving incongruous background advertising) that combine his two characteristic emotions: pervasive moody anxiety and quirky wit. His work is represented by photographic agency, TopFoto.

Chapman died on 19 August 2022, at the age of 95.

== Books ==
- Beats à Paris (Michael Kellner, Hamburg and OMC Communication GmbH, Düsseldorf 2001) – by Harold Chapman
- The Beat Hotel (Editeur banal gris, 1984) – by Harold Chapman, foreword by William Burroughs, foreword by Brion Gysin
- Everyman’s France (J.M.Dent, 1982) – by Maxine Feifer (Author), Harold Chapman (Photographer)
- Vanishing France (Quadrangle, New York, 1975) – John Hess, Harold Chapman
- The Paris Review #40 Winter - Spring Edition 1967 - Harold Chapman - Les Halles, Paris, Photographs with text by Luce Hoctin (Translated from French to English by Helen Weaver)
