= Harold Norse =

American writer (1916–2009)

- Norse in 1988
- Born: July 6, 1916; New York City, U.S.
- Died: June 8, 2009 (aged 92); San Francisco, California, U.S.
- Education: New York University

Harold Norse (July 6, 1916 – June 8, 2009) was an American writer who created a body of work using the American idiom of everyday language and images. One of the expatriate artists of the Beat Generation, Norse was widely published and anthologized.

== Life ==
Norse was born Harold Rosen to an unmarried Lithuanian Jewish immigrant in Brooklyn. When his mother married, the family took the last name Albaum. His stepfather was abusive. In the early 1950s, Norse created his new last name by rearranging the letters in Rosen.

Norse received his B.A. from Brooklyn College in 1938, where he edited the literary magazine. He had planned to continue his education towards a PhD, but as his writing received recognition from others, he pursued a writing career instead.

=== Writing career ===
Norse met Chester Kallman in 1938, and then became a part of W. H. Auden's "inner circle" when Auden moved to the U.S. in 1939. (Kallman and Auden later became lifelong partners.) However, Norse soon became allied with William Carlos Williams, who rated Norse the 'best poet of [his] generation.' Norse saw Williams as a father figure who provided mentorship as Norse began to publish poetry.

Inspired by Williams, Norse broke with traditional verse forms and embraced a more direct, conversational language. For the rest of his career, Norse's style continued to rely on everyday American speech, and he frequently explored themes of travel, identity, and sexuality in his poetry. One reviewer described Norse as "beat before the Beats, hip before the hippies, and out of the closet long before gay liberation."

Soon Norse was publishing in Poetry, The Saturday Review and The Paris Review. He received his master's degree in literature from New York University in 1951. His first book of poems, The Undersea Mountain, was published in 1953.

Norse became frustrated with the style of poetry written in New York, which was dominated by T. S. Eliot and Ezra Pound. From 1954 to 1959 Norse lived and wrote in Italy. He translated the sonnets of Giuseppe Gioacchino Belli during this time, publishing them in a manuscript prefaced by William Carlos Williams and Alberto Moravia. He wrote the experimental cut-up novel Beat Hotel in 1960 while living in Paris, where he lived with William S. Burroughs, Allen Ginsberg and Gregory Corso from 1959 to 1963. The novel was not published until 1973, when it received a first print run in German, although it was eventually printed over 30 times in English. At the Beat Hotel, Norse was inspired by the cut-up writing style to create astral ink paintings by soaking Bristol paper in a bidet; he titled these works cosmographs.

Norse then traveled to Tangier, where he stayed with Jane and Paul Bowles. Norse published his first work via a mainstream publisher during this time: The Dancing Beasts. During the 1960s, Norse published with small-press magazines of the Mimeo Revolution like Residu and Olé.

Returning to America in 1968, Norse arrived in Venice, California, near Charles Bukowski. Norse mentored Bukowski, and the pair corresponded for two decades. Norse was included in the Penguin Modern Poets series in 1969, and he asked that Bukowski and Philip Lamantia be included in the work as well.

Norse moved to San Francisco in 1972 and lived in the city's Mission District for the last 35 years of his life. His 1974 work, Hotel Nirvana, received critical praise and was nominated for a National Book Award, and in 1977 he published Carnivorous Saint. Norse and Bukowski contributed straight-oriented erotica to Hustler during the late 1970s, and Norse later said this work was how he earned his living during that time. Norse became a mentor to writer Neeli Cherkovski while in San Francisco.

In his later life,

Norse sought to publish works that would establish his literary legacy with a wider public. He worked on a manuscript publishing his correspondence with Bukowski, which he saw as a way to capitalize on Bukowski's popularity and introduce his own works to a wider audience. Norse saw his strengths as teaching and writing. He continued to read his poetry publicly into his 90s.

=== Recognition ===
Norse was a two-time NEA grant recipient. He received a lifetime achievement award from the National Poetry Association. During his later life, many scholars considered him one of the greatest living American poets and regarded him as under-appreciated. The writers of Harold Norse: Poet Maverick, Gay Laureate believe that his independence and identity, especially his queerness, made him too much of an outsider to receive popular recognition for his contributions to Beat poetry.

== Works ==
Memoirs of a Bastard Angel: A Fifty-Year Literary and Erotic Odyssey traces Norse's life and literary career, detailing his encounters with many artists. Many of the stories describe sexual encounters. He shares stories about Auden, Christopher Isherwood, E. E. Cummings, Tennessee Williams, William Carlos Williams, James Baldwin, Dylan Thomas, William Burroughs, Allen Ginsberg, Lawrence Ferlinghetti, Paul Bowles, Charles Bukowski, Robert Graves and Anaïs Nin. The title came from a discovery about his family history, when one of his aunts told him that his biological father, who had not been married to his mother when Norse was born, was German-American.

With Carnivorous Saint: Gay Poems 1941–1976 Norse became a leading gay liberation poet. The collection included decades of his poetry celebrating homosexuality and responding to its critics.

His collected poems, In the Hub of the Fiery Force, appeared in 2003.

== Personal life ==
Norse was gay and his poetry reflected his sexuality. His first childhood crush on a boy was reciprocated, and they had an encounter on a hike, but Norse stopped it because he was worried about being bullied and labeled a "fairy". He had his first sexual encounter when he was 21. Norse's first relationship with a man was with one of his professors. He later described the "triangle" between him, Chester Kallman, and W. H. Auden, and how the younger men approached Auden, but Norse eventually did not want to be in a relationship with a much older man. Norse said that many of his interactions with famous writers were shaped by their sexual desire.

Norse and Tennessee Williams were roommates in Provincetown while Williams wrote The Glass Menagerie.

Norse felt a strong affinity to two earlier poets with Brooklyn connections: Walt Whitman and Hart Crane.

Norse spent time in many countries, including the U.S., England, Italy, France, Germany, Austria, Spain, and Morocco.

In 1996, Norse had a heart attack and underwent quadruple bypass surgery. He largely worked from his house afterwards.

Norse died in a long-term care home in San Francisco in 2009. A nurse reported his last words as: "the end is the beginning."

== Bibliography ==
- The Undersea Mountain, Denver: Swallow Press, 1953
- The Roman Sonnets of Giuseppe Gioachino Belli, Highlands, North Carolina: Jargon 38, 1960
- The Dancing Beasts, New York: Macmillan, 1962
- Karma Circuit, London: Nothing Doing in London, 1966
- Penguin Modern Poets 13, Charles Bukowski, Philip Lamantia and Harold Norse, Harmondsworth: Penguin, 1969
- Bastard Angel Magazine, Issue #1, Edited by Harold Norse, San Francisco, Spring 1972
- Karma Circuit, San Francisco: Panjandrum Press, 1973
- Bastard Angel Magazine, Issue #2, Edited by Harold Norse, San Francisco, Spring 1974
- Hotel Nirvana, San Francisco: City Lights, 1974
- I See America Daily, San Francisco: Mother's Hen, 1974
- Bastard Angel Magazine, Issue #3, Edited by Harold Norse, San Francisco, Fall 1974
- Beat Hotel, German translation by Carl Weissner, Augsburg, Federal Republic of Germany: Maro Verlag, 1975, 1995
- Carnivorous Saint: Gay Poems 1941–1976, San Francisco: Gay Sunshine Press, 1977
- Beat Hotel (the English original), San Diego: Atticus Press, 1983
- Mysteries of Magritte, San Diego: Atticus Press, 1984
- Beat Hotel, Italian translation by Giulio Saponaro, Italy: Stamperia della Frontiera, 1985
- The Love Poems 1940–1985, Trumansburg, NY: The Crossing Press, 1986
- Memoirs of a Bastard Angel, preface by James Baldwin, New York: William Morrow and Company, 1989
- The American Idiom: A Correspondence, with William Carlos Williams, San Francisco: Bright Tyger Press, 1990
- Fly Like a Bat Out of Hell: The Letters of Harold Norse and Charles Bukowski, New York: Thunder's Mouth Press, 2002
- In the Hub of the Fiery Force, Collected Poems of Harold Norse 1934–2003, New York: Thunder's Mouth Press, 2003
- I Am Going to Fly Through Glass: The Selected Poems of Harold Norse, Edited by Todd Swindell, Introduction by Neeli Cherkovski, Greenfield, MA: Talisman House, 2014
- Karmakreis, German translation of Karma Circuit by Ralf Zühlke, Wenzendorf: Stadtlichter Presse, 2016
- Autostop! Hitching Through Italy on $2 a Day, Introduction by Todd Swindell, Schönebeck: Moloko+, 2025

== Anthologies ==
- New Directions 13, ed. James Laughlin, 1951
- Mentor, New American Library, 1958
- City Lights Journal, ed. L. Ferlinghetti, #1, 1963
- Best Poems of 1968: Borestone Mountain Poetry Awards, ed. Hildegarde Flanner, 1969
- City Lights Anthology, ed. Ferlinghetti, City Lights 1974
- A Geography of Poets, ed. Edward Field, Bantam 1979
- The Penguin Book of Homosexual Verse, ed. Stephen Coote, Penguin 1983
- Gay and Lesbian Poetry in Our Time: An Anthology, ed. Carl Morse and Joan Larkin, St. Martin's Press, 1988
- An Ear to the Ground, ed. Harris & Aguero, University of Chicago Press, 1989
- Big Sky Mind: Buddhism & the Beat Generation, ed. Carole Tonkinson, Riverhead Books, NY, 1995
- City Lights Pocket Poets Anthology, City Lights, 1995
- The Outlaw Bible of American Poetry, ed. Alan Kaufman and S.A. Griffin, Thunder's Mouth Press, 1999
- Beat Poets, ed. Caremla Ciuraru, Knopf, 2002

== Resources ==
- The Harold Norse Papers (1934–1980, 8,000 items) are archived at the Lilly Library, Indiana University, Bloomington.
- Harold Norse, James Baldwin, Anais Nin, William S. Burroughs, William Carlos Williams, Paul Carroll, Jack Hirschman, "Harold Norse Special Issue", Olé, No. 5 (Bensenville, IL: Open Skull Press, n.d., 1966?)
