= Kaddish (poem) =

Poem by Allen Ginsberg

"Kaddish" also known as "Kaddish for Naomi Ginsberg (1894–1956)" is a poem by Beat writer Allen Ginsberg about his mother Naomi and her death on June 9, 1956.

== Background ==
Ginsberg began writing the poem in the Beat Hotel in Paris in December 1957, completing it in New York in 1959. It was the lead poem in the collection Kaddish and Other Poems (1961). It is considered one of Ginsberg's finest poems, with some scholars holding that it is his best.

The Kaddish of the title refers to the mourner's prayer or blessing in Judaism. This long poem was Ginsberg's attempt to mourn his mother, Naomi, but also reflects his sense of loss at his estrangement from his birth religion. The traditional Kaddish contains no references to death, but Ginsberg's poem is riddled with thoughts and questionings of death.

== Stage version ==
Ginsberg wrote a screenplay based on the poem. Robert Frank was to direct it, but money could not be raised for the project. In 1972, Robert Kalfin readapted the screenplay for the stage and produced it at the Chelsea Theater Center in the Brooklyn Academy of Music. The play explored Naomi Ginsberg's schizophrenic collapse and made use of innovative video for flashback scenes.

There is a detailed description of this production and of behind-the-scenes incidents surrounding it in Davi Napoleon's chronicle of the Chelsea, Chelsea on the Edge: The Adventures of an American Theater (1991). Kalfin's adaptation was also staged in the Habima theater in Israel, translated by Nathan Zach and starring Yoram Khatav as Allen and Gila Almagor as Naomi. In June 2014 the play was adapted as a one actor play "Watching from Window" and premiered in "Israel Festival".

== Notes ==
Kaddish (קדיש Aramaic: "holy") refers to an important and central prayer in the Jewish prayer service. The central theme of the Kaddish is the magnification and sanctification of God's name. In the liturgy, several variations of the Kaddish are used functionally as separators between various sections of the service. The term "Kaddish" is often used to refer specifically to "The Mourners' Kaddish", said as part of the mourning rituals in Judaism in all prayer services as well as at funerals and memorials. When mention is made of "saying Kaddish", this unambiguously denotes the rituals of mourning.

A line from the poem, "No more to say and nothing to weep for", was later used as the title of a 1997 Channel 4 documentary on Ginsberg released shortly after his death.
