= Gavin Selerie =

British poet and academic (1949–2023)

- Born: Gavin Selerie; 1949; Hampstead, London
- Died: 18 June 2023 (aged 73–74)
- Citizenship: British
- Education: Haileybury
- Alma mater: Lincoln College, Oxford; University of York
- Occupations: Poet, academic
- Partner: Frances Presley

Gavin Selerie (1949 – 18 June 2023) was a British poet and academic.

== Life ==
Gavin Selerie was born in Hampstead, London in 1949. His father, Peter Selerie, was a wine merchant of Italian extraction who had served with distinction in the Second World War; his mother was Muriel (née Lee). His father's family had come to London from northern Italy circa 1880, running a restaurant in Wardour Street.

Selerie was educated at Haileybury, where he was 1969 fencing captain. He was awarded an Open Law Scholarship and matriculated to Lincoln College, Oxford, where he briefly read history before switching to English literature, and graduated in 1971. From 1973 to 1978, he researched Renaissance literature at the University of York, writing an MPhil thesis on The Winter's Tale.

From the 1980s until his retirement in 2004, Selerie taught creative writing, first in the Department of Extra-Mural Studies, University of London, later at Birkbeck College.

From the 1990s till his death, his partner was fellow poet Frances Presley.

Selerie was diagnosed with glioblastoma in 2022 and died of the disease in 2023. His funeral was held at Kensal Green Cemetery.

== Work ==
From 1978, Selerie was part of a group of London poets interested in innovative poetic procedures and small press publishing.

Between 1979 and 1983, he conducted and published the Riverside Interviews, book-length colversations with modernist and postmodernist writers including Cid Corman, Robert Creeley, Ed Dorn, Lawrence Ferlinghetti, Allen Ginsberg and Jerome Rothenberg.

== Publications ==
- Playground for the Working Line (Ziesing Bros., 1981).
- Hymenaei (Binnacle Press, 1981).
- Amergin (Binnacle Press, 1982).
- Azimuth (Binnacle Press, 1984).
- Strip Signals (Galloping Dog, 1986).
- Puzzle Canon (Spectacular Diseases, 1986).
- Elizabethan Overhang (Spectacular Diseases, 1989).
- Southam Street (New River Project, 1991).
- Tilting Square (Binnacle Press, 1992).
- Roxy (West House Books, 1996).
- Epithalamion (Binnacle Press, 1998).
- Vitagraph (Binnacle Press, 2001).
- Le Fanu's Ghost (Five Seasons Press, 2006).
- Music's Duel: New and Selected Poems 1972–2008 (Shearsman, 2009).
- Collected Sonnets (Shearsman, 2019).
- Late Poems (Shearsman, 2025).

=== Collaborative works ===
- Danse Macabre, with Alan Halsey et al. (West House Books, 1997).
- Days of '49, with Alan Halsey (West House Books, 1999).
