= Beat Hotel =

Hotel in Paris, France

Coordinates: 48°51′13.85″N 2°20′33.91″E

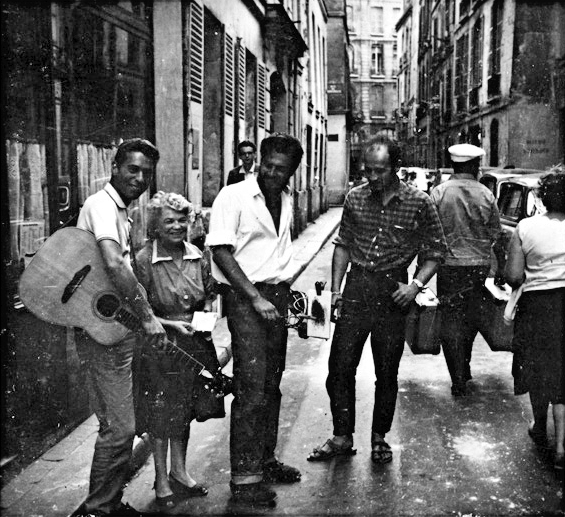
Outside The Beat Hotel, Paris: Peter Golding, Madame Rachou (Proprietor) and Robin Page, Peter's busking partner. Photo: Mike Kay

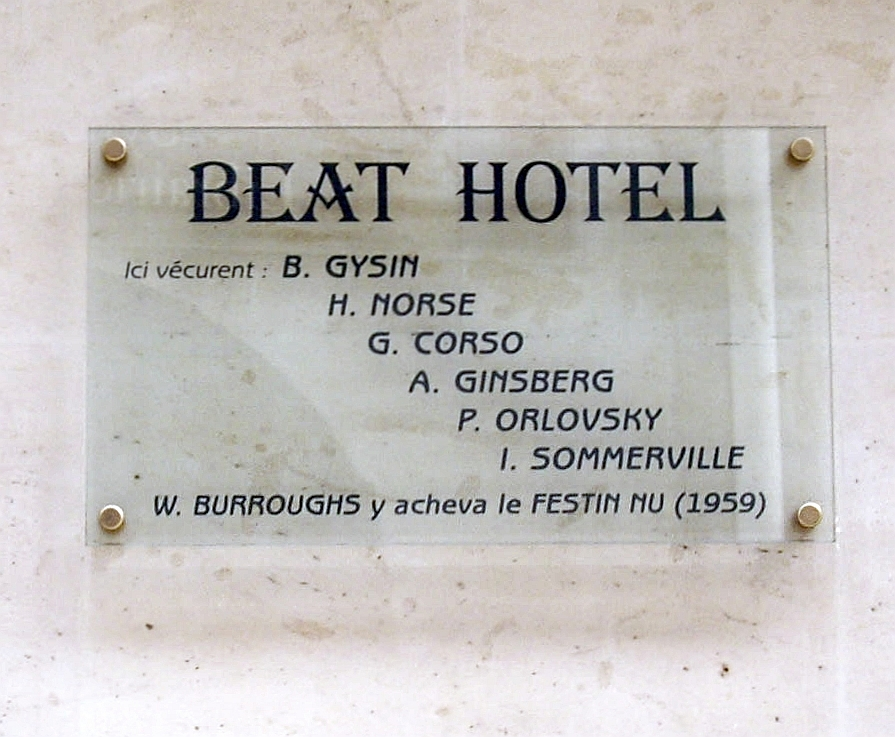
Plaque installed in 2009

The Beat Hotel was a small, run-down hotel of 42 rooms at 9 Rue Gît-le-Cœur in the Latin Quarter of Paris, notable chiefly as a residence for members of the Beat poetry movement of the mid-20th century.

== Overview ==
It was a "class 13" hotel, meaning bottom line, a place that was required by law to meet only minimum health and safety standards. It never had any proper name – "the Beat Hotel" was a nickname given it by Verta Kali Smart which stuck. The rooms had windows facing the interior stairwell and not much light. Hot water was available Thursdays, Fridays and Saturdays. The hotel offered the opportunity for a bath – in the only bathtub, situated on the ground floor – provided the guest reserved time beforehand and paid the surcharge for hot water. Curtains and bedspreads were changed and washed every spring. In principle the linen was changed every month.

Since 1933 the Beat Hotel was managed by a married couple, Monsieur and Madame Rachou. After the death of Monsieur Rachou in a traffic accident in 1957, Madame Rachou was the sole manager until the early months of 1963, when the hotel was closed. Besides letting rooms, the establishment had a small bistro on the ground floor. Due to early experiences with working at an inn frequented by Claude Monet and Camille Pissarro, Madame Rachou would encourage artists and writers to stay at the hotel and even at times permit them to pay the rent with paintings or manuscripts. One unusual thing that appealed to a clientele of bohemian artists was the permission to paint and decorate the rooms rented in whichever way they wanted.

== Fame with the Beat Generation ==
The hotel gained fame through the extended "family" of Beat Generation writers and artists who stayed there from the late 1950s to the early 1960s in a ferment of creativity.

Gregory Corso was introduced to the hotel by painter and resident Guy Harloff in 1957. In September of that year, Corso would be joined by Allen Ginsberg and Peter Orlovsky. William S. Burroughs, Derek Raymond, and Harold Norse, as well as Sinclair Beiles would follow. It was here that Burroughs completed the text of Naked Lunch and began his lifelong collaboration with Brion Gysin. It was also where Ian Sommerville became Burroughs' "systems advisor" and lover. Gysin introduced Burroughs to the cut-up technique and with Sommerville they experimented with a "dream machine" and audio tape cut-ups. Here Norse wrote a novel, Beat Hotel, using cut-up techniques. Ginsberg wrote a part of his moving and mature poem Kaddish at the hotel, and Corso wrote the mushroom cloud-shaped poem Bomb.

There is now a small hotel, the four-star Relais du Vieux Paris, at that address. It displays photographs of several Beat personalities and describes itself as "The Beat Hotel".

In July 2009, as part of a major William Burroughs symposium NakedLunch@50, a special tribute was held outside 9 Rue Gît-le-Coeur, with Jean-Jacques Lebel unveiling a plaque commemorative, now permanently hammered to the outside wall next to the main entrance, honoring the Beat Hotel's seven most famous occupants: B. Gysin, H. Norse, G. Corso, A. Ginsberg, P. Orlovsky, I. Sommerville, W. Burroughs.

== Bibliography ==
- The Beat Hotel, by Harold Chapman, gris banal, éditeur (1984)
- The Beat Hotel: Ginsberg, Burroughs, and Corso in Paris, 1957-1963, by Barry Miles (2001) (ISBN 1-903809-14-2) Excerpts
- Beat Hotel, by Harold Norse, Published by Atticus Press, 1983. ISBN 0-912377-00-3.
- The Birth of the Beat Generation: Visionaries, Rebels, and Hipsters, 1944-1960, by Steven Watson. Published by Pantheon Books, 1995. ISBN 0-679-42371-0.
- Fleabag Shrine: Diverse Particulars Apropos of No. 9 rue Git-le-Coeur, by Gregory Stephenson. Published by Ober-Limbo Verlag, Heidelberg, Germany, 2021. ISBN 978-87-971569-3-3.
