= Eddie Woods =

American poet

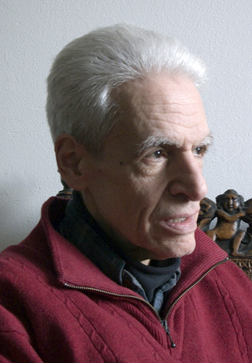
- Woods in 2007 (photo by Kirke Wilson).
- Born: May 8, 1940 Age 85; New York, United States
- Died: December 26, 2025 (aged 85); Amsterdam, Netherlands
- Occupations: Poet; prose writer; editor; publisher
- Spouse: Three marriages (including Jane Harvey)
- Children: Two daughters
- Writing career
- Pen name: Woodstock Jones (limited)
- Language: English

Eddie Woods (May 8th, 1940 - December 26th, 2025) was an American poet, prose writer, editor and publisher who lived and traveled in various parts of the world, both East and West, before eventually settling in Amsterdam, Netherlands, where in 1978 he started Ins & Outs magazine and two years later with Jane Harvey co-founded Ins & Outs Press.

According to Stanford University Libraries, which house Woods' archive: "In his role as a cultural impresario and artistic entrepreneur, Eddie Woods... is an important presence, both in American expatriate circles and among European avant-gardists. Woods' promotional activities made him, in short, a crucial center to the movement, and his archive documents his close connections with its leading figures..."

== Early to middle years ==
After not quite finishing high school, Woods worked for two years in Manhattan as a first-generation computer programmer, until in 1960 he joined the U.S. Air Force for a four-year stint, three years of which were spent in West Germany. Honorably discharged following a tour in Wyoming ("It was four years of guerrilla warfare, me against them, ending in a draw"), he returned to Germany, where he married twice, fathered two daughters, and successfully sold encyclopedias to US military personnel for five years, the entire time continuing to write poems, essays and short stories (a calling he first discovered at age 15).

In late 1968, Woods made his first journey to the East, remaining there until early 1973. During that time he was variously a restaurant manager in Hong Kong, a 'kept man' in Singapore (by a Chinese drag-queen prostitute), a features writer for the Bangkok Post (Tennessee Williams, with whom Woods hung out and traveled, through Malaysia to Singapore and back, was but one of many celebrated personalities he encountered at that time), a stringer for both The New York Times and ABC Radio News, a disc jockey (Radio Thailand English-language service), owner of a gay bar (in Pattaya, Thailand) and the managing director of Dateline Asia (a Bangkok-based features service he launched with three other journalists). In Bali, where he stayed for six months, he was known as "Durian Ed" and "Mushroom Ed" (having developed a unique method of liquefying psilocybin mushrooms and rendering them toxin-free). He was additionally in Laos, Okinawa, the Philippines, Macao, Java and Japan. Before returning to Europe, he explored much of Ceylon (Sri Lanka) and spent several months as a lay devotee at the Theravada Buddhist Island Hermitage.

In June 1973, in London, he met Jane Harvey, with whom he would years later start Ins & Outs magazine. Shortly thereafter, in the midst of doing a variety of odd jobs for Gentle Ghost, an alternative work agency, Woods authored nearly 30 articles for Edward de Bono's Eureka! An Illustrated History of Inventions from the Wheel to the Computer. He and Harvey then traveled overland to Asia, cycled across large stretches of India, were journalists for the Tehran Journal (Woods as sports and night editor, Harvey as business and local news editor), and crisscrossed much of the sub-continent and beyond. In 1976, Woods visited the United States for the first time in 12 years, where he wrote articles for the Berkeley Barb, published stories and poems in The Bystander, Odalisque, etc., and then hitchhiked across the South and up to New York. A two-year stretch back in London was exceptionally prolific: numerous poems and short stories, publication in Libertine, Iron magazine and other literary periodicals, as well as a series of personality profiles and features pieces for the International Times, an underground newspaper whose Amsterdam editor he would become during the early 1980s.

== Ins & Outs years ==
After editing three issues of Ins & Outs magazine in 1978 (contributors included Allen Ginsberg, with the first-ever publication of his Plutonian Ode, William Levy, Ira Cohen, Rachel Pollack, Simon Vinkenoog, Hans Plomp, Mel Clay, Heathcote Williams, Marc Morrel and Woods himself; while among the magazine's international readership, beginning with issue #1, was Henry Miller), Woods and Harvey left the Netherlands, passed through Paris and ended up in Barcelona.

Ties to the Dutch capital were already too strong, however. In 1979, the couple (who by then were married, but separated in late 1981, while remaining the closest of friends and professional colleagues) rented an attic flat in the heart of Amsterdam's red-light district and immediately got involved in publishing projects. Other World Poetry Newsletter, at once a historical evaluation of P78, the first One World Poetry festival (at which Woods performed, along with William S. Burroughs, Patti Smith, et al.) and a scathing critique of organized literary events, penned by Woods under the pseudonym Woodstock Jones and published and internationally distributed by Ins & Outs Press, caused a minor storm not only in Amsterdam but all the way to San Francisco. The Newsletter and its years-long aftermath are covered in Woods' Soyo Benn: A Profile and A Brief History of Ins & Outs Press.

Early in 1980, Woods, Harvey and the Dutch bookseller Henk van der Does formed the Ins & Outs Press Foundation (known as a stichting in the Netherlands) and also opened the Ins & Outs Bookstore (with the latter continuing for two years; after which Van der Does started his own bookshop and Woods turned the ground floor of the six-story Ins & Outs building into a gallery-cum-performance space).

Ins & Outs magazine #4/5 was published in the summer of that year. Within its pages were Paul Bowles, Lawrence Ferlinghetti, Bert Schierbeek, Gerard Malanga, Bob Kaufman, Charles Henri Ford, Gregory Corso, Roberto Valenza, John Wilcock, Steve Abbott, the photographers Diana Blok and Marlo Broekmans, Neeli Cherkovski and many others. Further publications followed throughout the 1980s and into the early 1990s, including:

- Natural Jewboy by William Levy
- Sale or Return by Eddie Woods
- a postcard series that included Ira Cohen's Bandaged Poets
- audio cassettes of live readings at Ins & Outs Press by Jack Micheline and Harold Norse
- limited-edition silkscreen prints by Kirke Wilson of Burroughs, Ginsberg, Herbert Huncke, Snuffie the Gangster Woof of Amsterdam, Xaviera Hollander and the "night mayor of Rotterdam" Jules Deelder

After that the press went into "suspended animation" for more than a decade. Woods, who had secluded himself from 1987, reemerged in 1992 with a string of performances as "The Gangster Poet", including at the North Sea Jazz Festival, Zuiderstrand Festival, Crossing Border Festival, appearances with the Kali Quartet, et al.

From 1995 through most of 1998, Woods organized monthly poetry-reading evenings at a small, working-class Amsterdam café that quickly became the literary talk of the town, written up in national newspapers and even featured on Dutch television.

In the autumn of 1998, Woods relocated to Devonshire, England to live with Jenny Brookes, whom he had first met in India in 1975 but had not seen (prior to visiting her in May 1998) for 18 years. The relationship lasted for six years.

Upon its collapse, Woods returned to Amsterdam and Ins & Outs Press resumed its publishing activities. Woods' spoken-word CD Dangerous Precipice was released in 2004 and his book Tsunami of Love: A Poems Cycle (two long narrative poems and four shorter ones, chronicling "the rise and fall of an incredible love affair") in 2005. The CD Tsunami of Love (Woods reciting the entire collection, with a special introduction added) appeared in August 2007. In January 2012, Tsunami of Love was again published, this time in an Amazon Kindle edition, by Barncott Press (London).

Since 2005, Woods has made several on-stage appearances at the annual Whitsun weekend Fiery Tongues literary festival, held in the artists colony village of Ruigoord, near Amsterdam. In May 2015 he was presented with the Ruigoord Trophy, making him only the third non-Dutch person to be so honored.

In July 2009, Woods attended a major Burroughs symposium in Paris, NakedLunch@50, where he delivered his homage to Burroughs entitled "Thank God You're Not Eddie Woods!" and also participated in a special tribute to the old Beat Hotel at 9 rue Gît-le-Cœur, together with Jean-Jacques Lebel, the poet Nina Zivancevic, Scottish artist Elliot Rudie, and others.

In December 2011, Sloow Tapes (Stekene, Belgium) released the Eddie Woods spoken-word audio cassette The Faerie Princess & Other Poems.

And in September 2013, Inkblot Publications (Providence, Rhode Island) published Tennessee Williams in Bangkok, Eddie Woods' memoir of his time (early 1970s) in Thailand and Singapore. A Kindle edition of the same book was published by Barncott Press (London) in August 2014. This was followed in December 2014 by a Dutch-language edition entitled Bangkok Confidential, published by SpeakEasy (Amsterdam, Netherlands).

In February 2014, Barncott Press (London) published Woods' collection of short fiction entitled Smugglers Train & Other Stories.

Also in February 2014, a Yarre Stooker film based on the Eddie Woods poem "Mary" and starring Win Harms in the title role was released online. The film is entitled Mary

In February 2017, Moloko+ (Schönebeck, Germany) published the Eddie Woods book Smugglers Train, a collection of 19 poems in the original English and six prose pieces as translated into German by Pociao (Sylvia de Hollanda).

Then in December 2021, while sticking to Woods' original title, Moloko+ (Moloko Print) published a German edition of Tennessee Williams in Bangkok (translation by Pociao and Roberto de Hollanda).

== Archive ==
The Eddie Woods Archive was acquired by Stanford University in 2003, after he and the writer/radio disc jockey Bart Plantenga had worked for five years assembling it (with Woods regularly shuttling back and forth from England specifically for that purpose). Further material was added in late 2007 (the Jenny Brookes file), and again in early 2020 (several dozen assorted files).

== Quotes on Woods ==
"Ed Woods? / I call him the Gingko / slender and strange..." Ira Cohen. From his poem Honorable Discharge.

"Slim behind the desk, only a rush of hair / eddie woods, he's got the goods..." Mel Clay, Ira Cohen, Ronald Sauer. From their Eddie Woods Memorial Poem.

"It would have been a much colder world without your poetry." Plamen Arnaudov, poet, former New Delta Review poetry editor and Exquisite Corpse editorial assistant.

"Because it will not be content with a conventional language of expression, a profound love will produce a profound poetry, and it is precisely such poetry which Eddie Woods has achieved." Richard Livermore, editor of Chanticleer Magazine (Edinburgh, Scotland), in his review of Tsunami of Love: A Poems Cycle.

== See also ==
- List of American poets
- Norse, Harold (2002). Memoirs of a Bastard Angel: A Fifty-Year Literary and Erotic Odyssey. New York: William Morrow. ISBN 978-0-688-06704-5.
- Codrescu, Andrei (1989). Raised by Puppets, Only to Be Killed by Research. Addison-Wesley. ISBN 0-201-12183-2.
- William Levy: Beyond Criticism (2006). Biographical documentary film, directed by Hart, Malcolm Archived 2009-09-25 at the Wayback Machine.
- "A Good Friend". The New Millennium. Vol. 2, No. 2, Spring 2003. Kerala, India.
- "Buddhist Intimations". The New Millennium. Vol. 1, No. 3, Summer 2002. Kerala, India.
- P78 Anthology. Poetry & The Punks: An Apocalyptic Confrontation. Mandala 1112. Uitgeverij In de Knipscheer. Haarlem, Netherlands. 1979. ISBN 90-6265-037-6. ISSN 0165-1234.
- Harvey, Jane. Pedalling to Puri. The New Millennium. Vol. 1, No.2., Spring 2002. Kerala, India.
- Exquisite Corpse. "So-So". Issue no. 51. 1995. Baton Rouge, Louisiana.
- Exquisite Corpse "Poems for Corry". Issue no. 36. 1987. Baton Rouge, Louisiana.
- Chanticleer Magazine. Issues 12, 14, 16, 17, 18, 19 (2006–2008). Edinburgh, Scotland. ISSN 1478-0704.
- "Lust Will Tear Us Apart". The Brooklyn Rail. November 2007. Review by Jim Feast of the Tsunami of Love: A Poems Cycle CD.
- "Tsunami of Love CD". Evergreen Review, no. 115. January 2008. Review by Jim Feast.
- de Boer, Sacha. Retour New York-Amsterdam. Interviews, with Eddie Woods and 15 other artists (bilingual, English-Dutch). Uitgeverij Atlas. Amsterdam, 2009. ISBN 978-90-450-1485-2.
- Beat Scene Issue no. 61 (February 2010). Coventry, England. Features two Eddie Woods stories, "Remembering Harold Norse" and "Thank God You're Not Eddie Woods!"
- The End Is The Beginning: Elegy for the Carnivorous Saint. Harold Norse memorial collection (February 2010). Todd Swindell, editor. Sebastopol, California.
- Sjoman, N.E. art: the dark side. Black Lotus Books. Calgary, Canada. 2010. ISBN 978-0-9736162-3-1.
- Sensitive Skin #3. Online literary and arts magazine, featuring the story behind and film adaptation of the Eddie Woods poem Bananas.
- Beat Scene. Issue no. 63 (Winter 2010). Coventry, England. Features Eddie Woods' interview with Jack Micheline, "Either Poetry or a Machine Gun."
- Beat Scene. Issue no. 64 (Spring 2011). Coventry, England. Features Eddie Woods' review of the Francis Ford Coppola claymation film adaptation of the William S. Burroughs short story "The Junky's Christmas."
- Beat Scene. Issue no. 66 (Autumn 2011). Coventry, England. Features three Gregory Corso anecdotes by Eddie Woods.
- The Beat Hotel (2011). Documentary film, directed by Alan Govenar about the Beat Hotel, in Paris at 9, rue Gît-le-Cœur that was home to many Beat Generation writers during the late 1950s to the early 1960s, and in which Eddie Woods (among many others) is prominently featured.
- Beat Scene Issue no. 67 (Spring 2012). Coventry, England. Features an Eddie Woods story about the late George Whitman, founder of Paris' Shakespeare & Co. bookstore.
- Beat Scene Issue no. 73 (Summer 2014). Coventry, England. Features Eddie Woods' first-person narrative "Bill Burroughs in Amsterdam."
