= Ira Cohen =

American poet

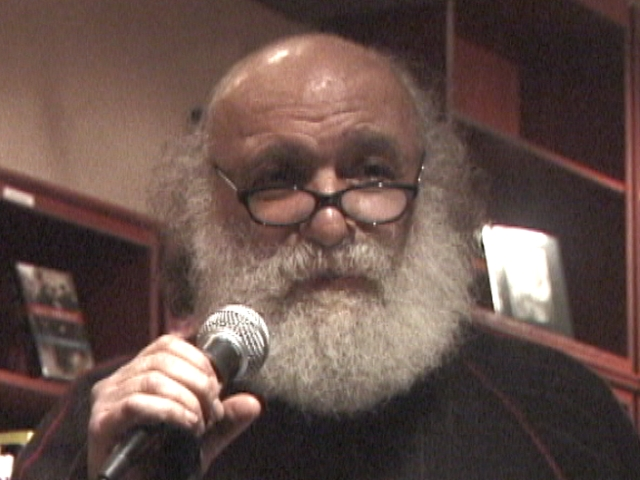
Cohen in 2007

Ira Cohen (February 3, 1935 – April 25, 2011) was an American poet, publisher, photographer and filmmaker.

Cohen lived in Morocco and in New York City in the 1960s, he was in Kathmandu in the 1970s and traveled the world in the 1980s, before returning to New York, where he spent the rest of his life. Cohen died of kidney failure on April 25, 2011. Ira Cohen's literary archive now resides at the Beinecke Rare Book and Manuscript Library, Yale University. His works include the literary magazine GNAOUA, a series of "mylar images" of artists such as Jimi Hendrix, and the 1968 film The Invasion of Thunderbolt Pagoda.

== Early life ==
Cohen was born in 1935 in the Bronx, New York City, to deaf parents. Cohen graduated from the Horace Mann School at 16 and attended Cornell University, where he took a class taught by Vladimir Nabokov. Cohen dropped out of Cornell, then enrolled at the School of General Studies of Columbia University. He married Arlene Bond, a Barnard student, in 1957. They had two children, David and Rafiqa.

== Morocco ==
In 1961, Cohen took a Yugoslavian freighter to Tangier, Morocco where he lived for four years. Before settling in Tangier, he crossed over to Spain's Costa del Sol and stayed for a spell with friends in Torremolinos. (Cohen's early sojourns in certain European cities, including London and Paris, were as part of a return trip he made up from Morocco a little later on.) In Tangier Cohen edited and published GNAOUA, a literary magazine devoted to exorcism and Beat-era writings (prose and poetry), introducing the work of Brion Gysin, William S. Burroughs, Harold Norse and others. GNAOUA also featured Jack Smith and Irving Rosenthal. Cohen also produced Jilala, field recordings of trance music by a sect of Moroccan dervishes made by Paul Bowles and Brion Gysin. The original 1965 LP record was reissued in 1998 by Baraka Foundation/Mystic Fire as a CD.

== Return to New York ==
Cohen returned to New York in the mid-1960s. There he published The Hashish Cookbook (Gnaoua Press, 1966), which had been written in Tangier at Brion Gysin's suggestion by Cohen's then-girlfriend Rosalind, under the pseudonym "Panama Rose". In his loft on the Lower East Side, Cohen created the "mylar images", styled as "future icons" as developed by a "mythographer". Among the reflected artists in his mirror were John McLaughlin, Ching Ho Cheng, William S. Burroughs and Jimi Hendrix - who said that looking at these photos was like "looking through butterfly wings". Probably Cohen's most widely disseminated mylar photographs were the cover photos of the Spirit album Twelve Dreams of Dr. Sardonicus, which was released in 1970 and was certified Gold in 1976. In this photographic process Cohen explored the whole spectrum from infrared to black light. In 1968 he directed the "phantasmagorical" film The Invasion of Thunderbolt Pagoda and produced Marty Topp's Paradise Now, a film of the Living Theatre's historic American tour. He was inspired by the films of Kenneth Anger and Sergei Parajanov and began as an extension of his photography work with his Mylar chamber. On May 31, 1970, Raphael Aladdin Cohen was born in New York City to Jhil McEntyre and Ira Cohen; Raphael Aladdin currently resides in Harlem with his wife, the dancer and choreographer Kristina Berger.

== Travels in the 1970s ==
In company with former Living Theatre member Petra Vogt, Cohen went to the Himalayas in the 1970s where he started the Starstream poetry series under the Bardo Matrix imprint in Kathmandu, publishing the work of Charles Henri Ford, Gregory Corso, Paul Bowles and Angus Maclise. Here he developed bookmaking art, working with native craftsmen. In 1972 he spent a year in San Francisco reading and performing, and then returned to New York to mount photographic shows.

== Amsterdam ==
In early 1964, Cohen visited Amsterdam (during the same trip up from Tangier when he arranged for the printing of Gnaoua in Antwerp, Belgium). He befriended writer Simon Vinkenoog, who would later translate many of Cohen's writings into Dutch. Ira was also in Amsterdam in 1974, having visited Paris and the filmmaker Alejandro Jodorowsky with an intention to involve his partner, Petra Vogt, in Jodorowsky's forthcoming film Dune. Unfavorably received, he traveled to Amsterdam, again in the company of Simon Vinkenoog, Louise Landes Levi - poet, musician & translator with whom he would later collaborate on many projects – and Gerard Bellaart (Cold Turkey Press - Rotterdam, publisher of Burroughs, Bailes, Pound et al.), who became Ira's first publisher in the West & a lifelong friend, as was Levi. However his most continuous Amsterdam period began in the spring of 1978. It was then that he met Caroline Gosselin, a French girl who was making and selling life masks at the Melkweg (Milky Way) multimedia center. She and Cohen expanded this into Bandaged Poets - a series of papier-mâché masks of dozens of well-known poets that he subsequently photographed. He also reconnected with Eddie Woods, whom he had first met in Kathmandu in 1976. Woods, who co-founded Ins & Outs Press with Jane Harvey, was preparing to launch Ins & Outs magazine. Cohen's work appeared in every issue and he regularly served as a contributing editor. He performed at the first of Benn Posset's long-running One World Poetry festivals, P78. Cohen (and Gosselin) lived in Amsterdam for the next three years; and even after leaving he made several return visits to the city, often staying for long spells. Ins & Outs Press, which had already published postcards of the Bandaged Poets series, produced three limited-edition Kirke Wilson silkscreen prints of the photographs, including those of William Burroughs and Allen Ginsberg. His film Kings with Straw Mats was also edited, in collaboration with Ira Landgarten, at Ins & Outs. In September 1993 Cohen returned to Amsterdam from New York to participate in a Benn Posset-organized tribute to Burroughs, along with Woods, the American writer William Levy, the German translator & publisher Udo Breger, and others.

Cohen further developed a close association with the artists colony village of Ruigoord (eight miles west of Amsterdam) and is one their very few non-Dutch trophy holders.

== Second return to New York ==
In 1981, Cohen again returned to New York, and moved in with his mother in an Upper West Side apartment. In 1982 he married Carolina Gosselin, and they had a daughter, Lakshmi Cohen, before divorcing in 1989.

Cohen continued to travel during the 1980s, making trips to Ethiopia, Japan, and back to India, where he documented on film the great Kumbh Mela festival, the largest spiritual gathering on the planet, in the film Kings with Straw Mats. In the latter part of the decade Synergetic Press published On Feet of Gold, a book of selected poems.

Cohen also worked as a contributing editor of Third Rail, a review of international arts and literature based in Los Angeles.

== Publications and exhibitions ==
In the 1990s, Cohen met with increasing international recognition as his poems were published in England by Temple Press under the title Ratio 3: Media Shamans Along with Two Good Poet Friends, the friends being Gerard Malanga and Angus Maclise. He had a show called Retrospectacle at the October Gallery in London and he also took part along with William Burroughs, Terry Wilson and Hakim Bey at the Here To Go Show in Dublin in 1992, which celebrated the painter Brion Gysin.

The '90s also introduced collaborations with Musician/Composers Sylvie Degiez and Wayne Lopes with the creation of "CosmicLegends", an improvisational music theater group, resulting in the world premiere of Angus Maclise's ORPHEO staged at The Kitchen NYC. Billed as an Akashic Event, the name was changed to ORFEO:The $500 Opera to reflect the sparse budget made available by the Kitchen. For the next 20 years Cohen was a regular collaborator and member of Cosmiclegends, along with Judith Malina, Hanon Reznikov, Wayne Lopes, Rashied Ali, Taylor Meade, and Louise Landes Levi, all contributing to the larger-than-life performances conceived by Swiss/American composer Sylvie Degiez: "Let the Beast Scream", "Devachan and the Monads", "The Moody Moon" and more.

In May 1995, Cohen edited an Akashic Issue for Broadshirt, a magazine on a T-shirt designed by Phyllis Segura, with more than 20 contributors, including Paul Bowles, Brion Gysin, Gerard Malanga, Ganesh Baba, John Solt, Judith Malina, Louise Landes Levi, and others.

In 1994, Sub Rosa Records released Cohen's first CD, The Majoon Traveller, with Cheb i Sabbah, which also included the work of Don Cherry and Ornette Coleman.

In the 2000s (decade), Cohen gave a number of readings in New York City, including a collaboration with the musical group Sunburned Hand of the Man.

Cohen was a participating artist in the Whitney Biennial 2006, "Day for Night", with two back-lit transparency photographs, Jack Smith as the Norebo, Prince of the Venusian Munchkins, and The Magician from the Grand Tarot.

In May 2007, Cohen was featured in performance Georg Gatsas' Process VI - FINAL exhibit at the Swiss Institute in New York City. Cohen read poems accompanied by projections of his mylar photographs and was accompanied by the musical group Mahasiddhi.

In October 2007, an exhibit of Cohen's portrait photographs Hautnah / Up Close & Personal was mounted at the WIDMER+THEODORIDIS contemporary gallery in Zurich. A complementary book was planned by Papageien-Verlag for early 2008 but is, as yet, unpublished. Subjects included Patti Smith, Madonna, William Burroughs and Paul Bowles

Also in October 2007, an exhibit of Cohen's mylar photographs opened in London at the October Gallery.

== Bibliography ==
- Seven Marvels (Katmandu: Bardo Matrix, 1975)
- Poems from the Cosmic Crypt (Katmandu: Bardo Matrix and Kali Press, 1976)
- From the Divan of Petra Vogt (Rotterdam: Cold Turkey Press, 1976)
- Gilded Splinters (Katmandu: Bardo Matrix, 1977)
- The Stauffenberg Cycle and Other Poems (Heerlen, Netherlands: Uitgeverij 261, 1981). ISBN 90-6512-013-0
- Media Shamans Ratio 3 (with Gerard Malanga and Angus MacLise, London: Temple Press, 1991). ISBN 1-871744-30-X
- On Feet of Gold (Synergetic Press, London 1986). ISBN 0-907791-10-7
- Minbad Sinbad (Didier Devillez, Brüsszel 1998)
- Kaliban und Andere Gedichte (Göttingen: AltaQuito Press, 1999, translated by Florian Vetsch)
- Wo das Herz ruht (Herdecke: Rohstoff Verlag, 2001, bilingual, translated by Florian Vetsch)
- Poems from the Akashic Record (New York: Goody, 2001)
- Shamanic Warriors Now Poets (anthology edited by J. N. Reilly and Ira Cohen, Glasgow, Scotland: R & R Publishing, 2004). ISBN 0-9534280-1-X
- Chaos and Glory (Utah: Elik Press, 2004)
- Whatever You Say May Be Held Against You (Shivastan Press) (2004)
- Cornucopion - Bőségszaru (Budapest: Új Mandátum and I.A.T. Press, 2007, translated by Gabor G. Gyukics). ISBN 978-9-639609-64-8
- Ira Cohen: God's Bounty (Salt Lake City, Utah: Elik Press, 2008)
- Ira Cohen: Wo das Herz ruht (enlarged second edition, bilingual; Wenzensdorf: Verlag Stadtlichterpresse, 2010, translated by Florian Vetsch)
- Ira Cohen - in Memory of (Fabrikzeitung Nr. 272, Zurich, June 2011, edited by Etrit Hasler & Florian Vetsch)
- Ira Cohen: Das grosse Reispapier-Abenteuer von Kathmandu (München: Verlag Books Ex Oriente, 2011, translated by Florian Vetsch)
- Ira Cohen, Jürgen Ploog, Florian Vetsch: A Night in Zurich (Luzern: Verlag Der Kollaboratör, 2012)
- Hautnah / Up Close & Personal (Papageien-Verlag) (unpublished)
- Ira Cohen, Jürgen Ploog, Florian Vetsch: A Night in Zurich (second enlarged edition; Mainz: Gonzo Verlag, 2018)
- Alcazar – 17 Poems / 17 Gedichte (bilingual edition; translated into German by Axel Monte and Florian Vetsch; with a postface by Jürgen Ploog; edited by Florian Vetsch). Moloko Print, Pretzien 2021

== Filmography ==
- The Invasion of Thunderbolt Pagoda (1968)
- Kings With Straw Mats (1986)
- Brain Damage (2006)
