= Plomp =

Plomp is a surname. Notable people with the surname include:

- Gerrit Plomp (born 1963), Dutch footballer
- Hans Plomp (1944–2024), Dutch writer, playwright, and poet
