= Moody Street Irregulars =

American literary magazine

Fall 1982 Moody Street Irregulars cover illustration by Steve Fiorilla

Moody Street Irregulars (subtitled A Jack Kerouac Newsletter) was an American publication dedicated to the history and the cultural influences of Jack Kerouac and the Beat Generation. Edited and published by Joy Walsh, it featured articles, memoirs, reviews and poetry. Published from Clarence Center, New York, it had a run of 28 issues from Winter 1978 to 1992. Some issues were edited by Walsh with Michael Basinski and Ana Pine.

The magazine's approach is indicated by the contents of issue number 9 (1981), a special Vanity of Duluoz issue including essays and articles by Gregory Stephenson, John Clellon Holmes, Carolyn Cassady, plus an interview with William S. Burroughs by Jennie Skerl.

Issue number 11 (Spring/Summer 1982) was a special "French Connection" issue, featuring articles and essays about Kerouac, his French-Canadian ancestry and his popularity in Quebec.

Issue number 15, published in 1985, was a special "Music Issue":

- “Missing the Beat” by Joel Scherzer
- “Jack and the Beatstalkers” by Warren Peace
- “Kerouac and the Big Beat” by Joel Scherzer
- "Mark Murphy’s Bop for Kerouac" by John Jablonski
- “Through a Swinging Looking Glass or Steps to Discovering Jack Kerouac” by Con Holland-Skinner
- Poems: “To Kerouac” by Tony Quagliano, “Thelonious Monk” by Michael F. Hopkins, “Bird in Paradise” by Steve Dalashinsky, “Jazz for Jack” by Tom Clark, “Aalborg” by Finn Slumstrup, “Jack Kerouac” by Dann Belanger
- “The Golden Juke Box” by Kevin Ring
- “Van Morrison and Kerouac” by Alex Albright
- Book reviews, including “Mysteries of Magritte” by Harold Norse, “Jack Kerouac” by Tom Clark, “All the News” by Mark Pawlak
- “Jazz and the Modern Symphony and the News Music”, two articles by Jack Kerouac and Tom Livornese

== Contributors ==

One of the writers was Kevin Ring who edited and published a UK magazine, Beat Scene, which also probed and surveyed Beat culture. Ring's publication was launched in Coventry, England in 1988. Dave Moore, of Bristol, UK was also a regular contributor to Moody Street Irregulars. In January 1984, he launched his own magazine, The Kerouac Connection; the magazine ran for 30 issues.

Another contributor to Moody Street Irregulars was illustrator Steve Fiorilla. who drew both covers and interior art.

== Index ==
In 1990, Textile Bridge Press published Index to Moody Street Irregulars: A Jack Kerouac Newsletter (Esprit Critique Series No 4) by Michael Basinski.

The title of the publication derives from the Baker Street Irregulars, a group of street urchins often employed by Sherlock Holmes in the novels by Sir Arthur Conan Doyle.

== See also ==
- Evergreen Review
- New World Writing
- The Realist
