= Ces53 =

Dutch graffiti artist

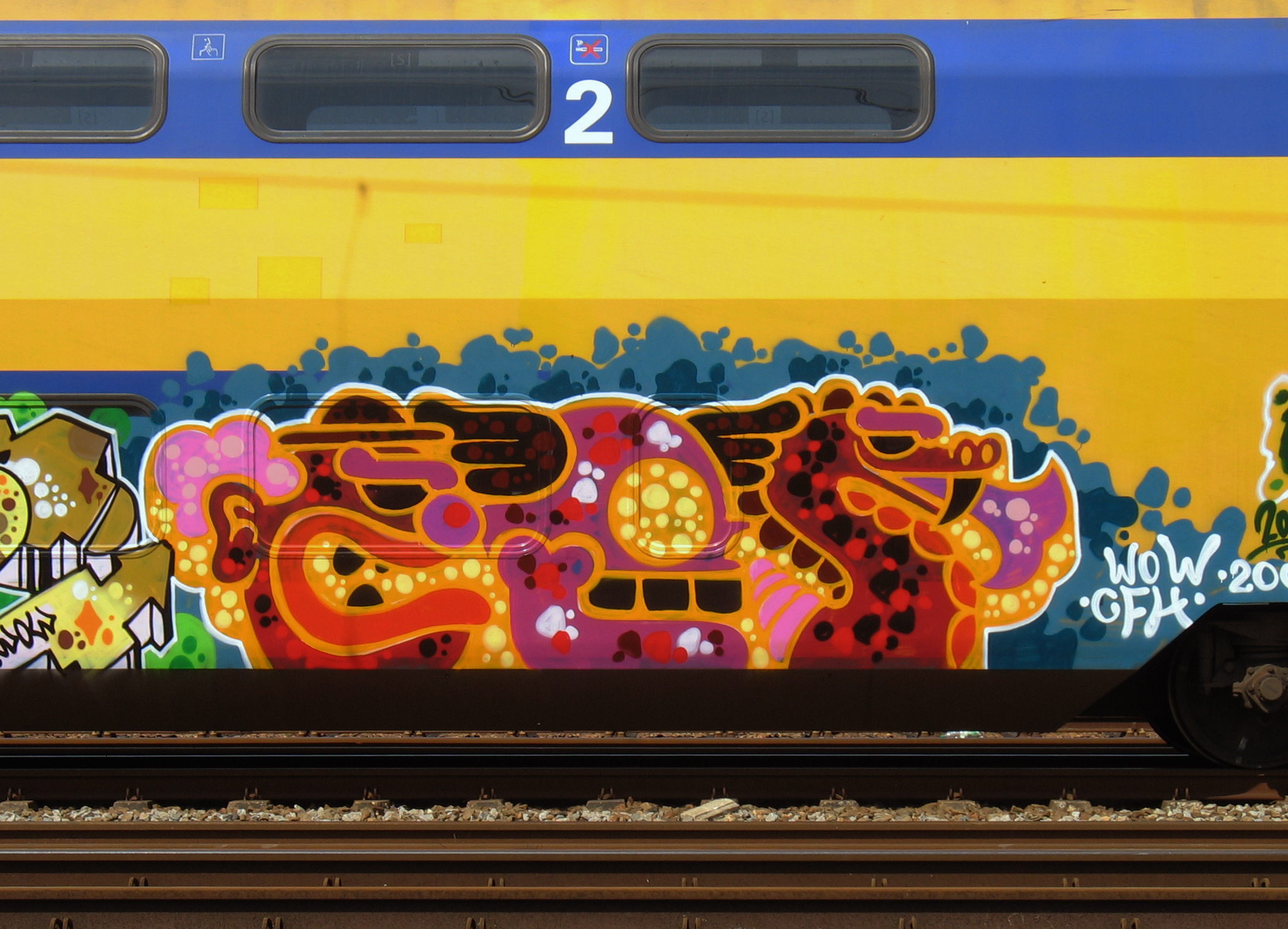
- Ces53 graffiti on a VIRM, 2009
- Born: Tonny van Hoenderloo van Zandt
- Education: Willem de Kooning Academy
- Movement: Graffiti
- Website: ces53.com

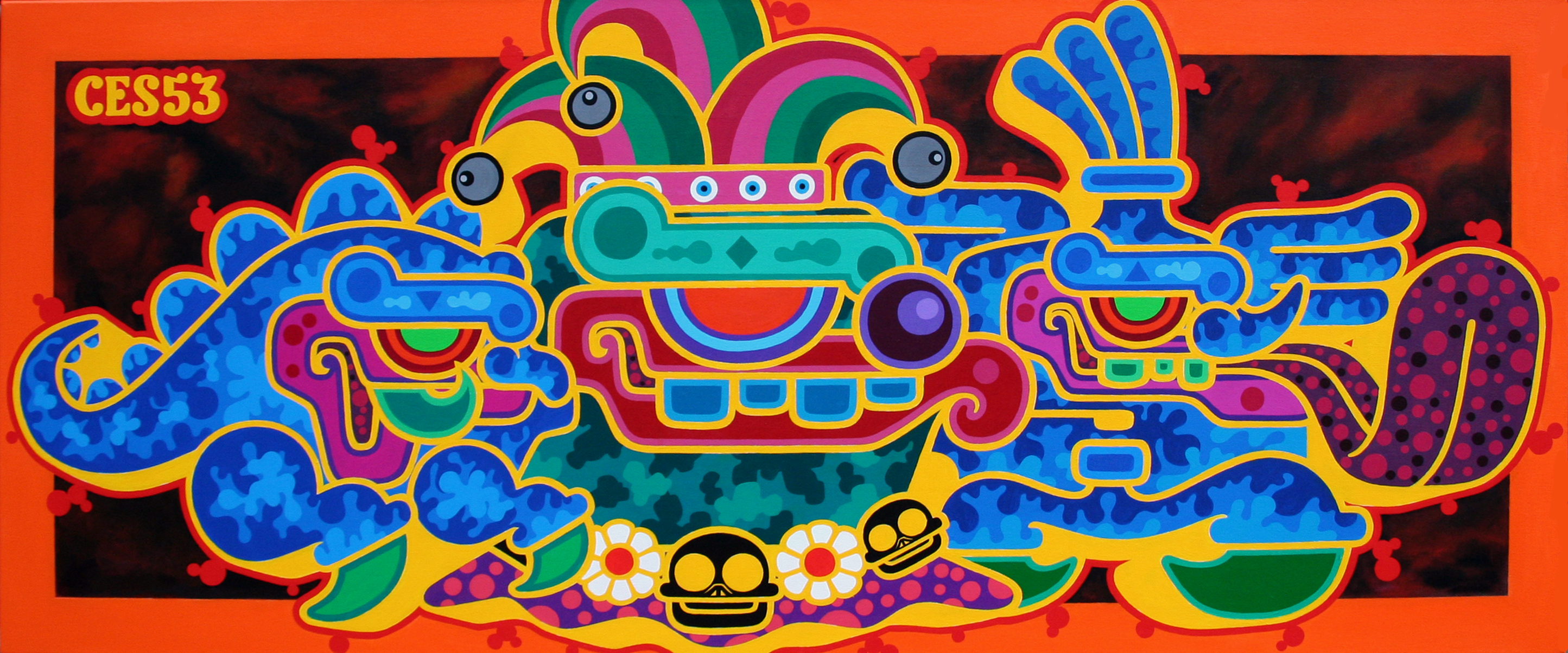
"COMEBACK OF THE CHAVIN MINDED FUNNY ONE" Painting on canvas, by Ces53

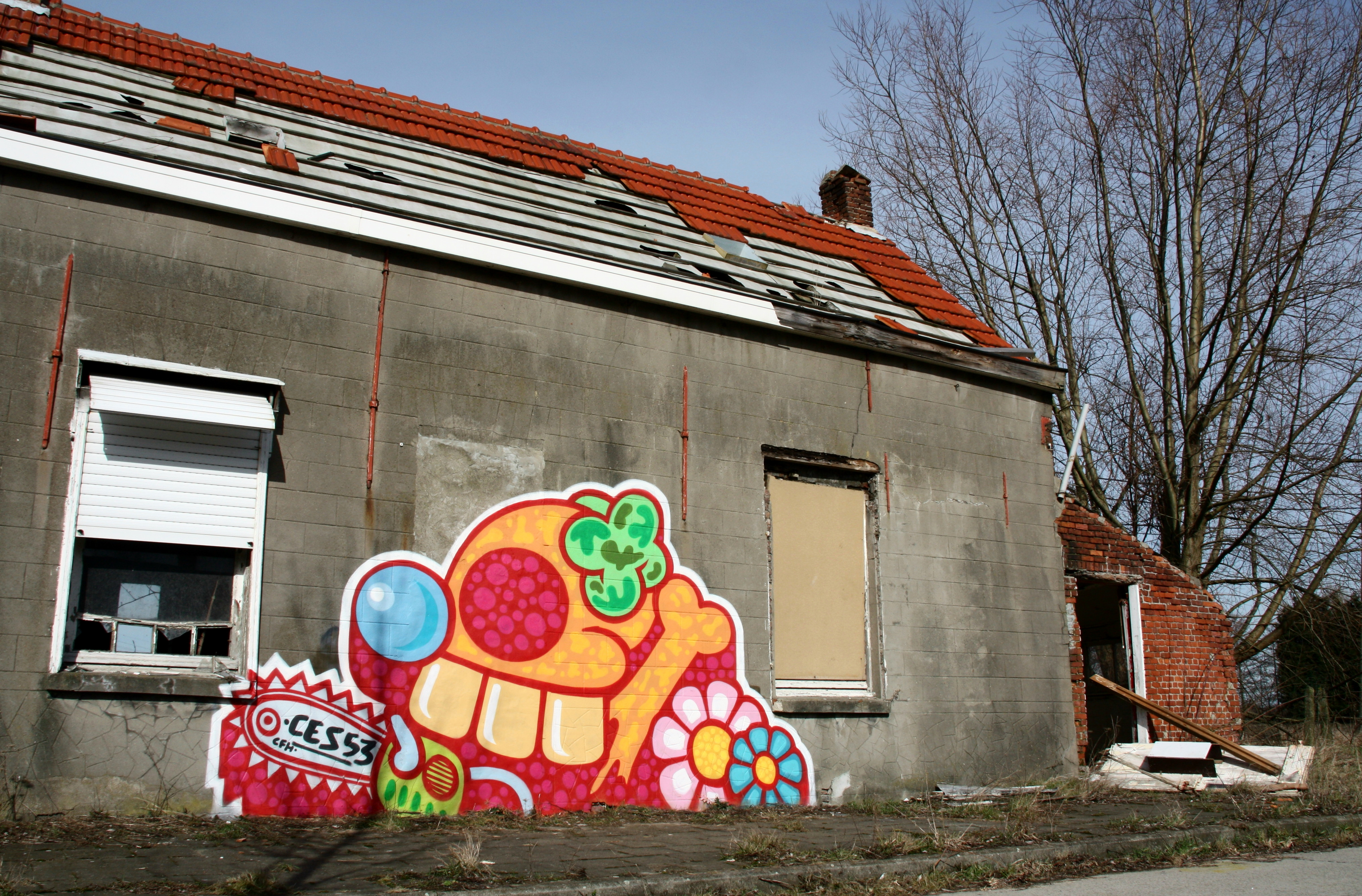
Street art by Ces53 in Doel, Belgium a ghost-town attracting street artists.

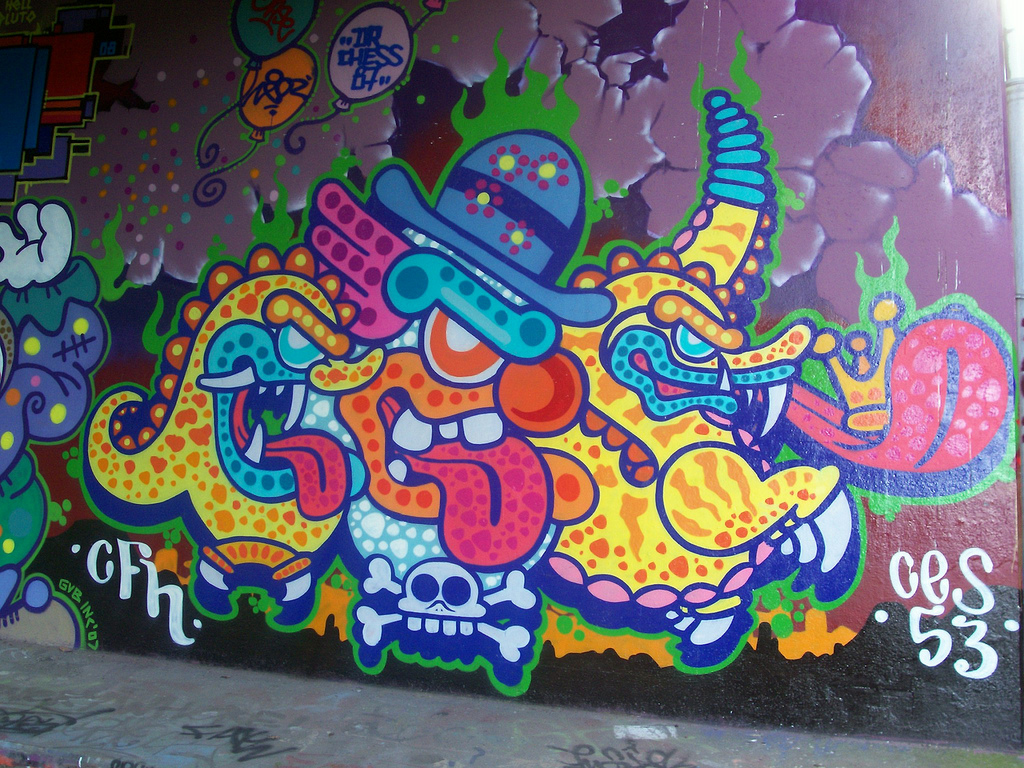
Painting in the Global tradition by Ces53

Ces53 is the graffiti name of Tonny van Hoenderloo van Zandt, street art/graffiti artist from the Netherlands. Ces53 has been active since 1985 and is the creator of many international street art/graffiti paintings, predominantly in European cities but also worldwide in Mexico, United States and Burma.

== Work ==
Ces53 started as a traditional graffiti writer, one of the first to paint graffiti on trains in the Netherlands, Belgium and Germany. He became world-famous because of his high-quality graffiti paintings, also adopted more traditional art forms during the years, including painting and sculpturing. He became renowned for his innovative styles, quantity of work, and gained a lot of fame and followers within the graffiti community. Since 2005 Ces53 is also part of Lastplak, a world-famous Dutch street art collective.
