= Gladys Shelley =

American lyricist and composer

- Born: Gladys Shaskan; December 15, 1911; Lawrence, New York
- Died: December 9, 2003 (aged 91); Manhattan, New York City
- Education: Columbia University
- Occupations: Songwriter, Singer
- Known for: How Did He Look?
- Spouse: Irving Rosenthal

Gladys Shelley (née Shaskan, December 15, 1911 – December 9, 2003) was an American lyricist and composer, who was responsible for over 300 songs.

== Early life ==
Gladys Shaskan was born in Lawrence, New York, to George Fried and Fannie Shaskan. She began writing at an early age. Her first efforts were primarily poetry and before graduating from high school she had had several items of her light verse published by Walter Winchell and other newspaper columnists.

After high school, she moved to Manhattan, enrolling at Columbia University and working for a time as an actress and dancer. She began writing song lyrics in the late 1930s.

== Collaborations ==
In 1940, Gladys Shelley and Abner Silver penned "How Did He Look?", which became her first hit and most frequently recorded song, originally done in 1941 by Joan Merrill. Her second song with Silver, "There Shall Be No Night", had its title taken from a then-current anti-Nazi play, and was recorded by the orchestras of Duke Ellington, Bob Chester, and Dick Jurgens. Over the course of her career, she penned more than 300 songs with a variety of composers, including Morton Gould, Frank Black, and Fred Astaire. The Shelly-Astaire collaboration, "Just Like Taking Candy From A Baby", was recorded by Astaire. The pair wrote "Sweet Sorrow" and "Just Like Taking Candy From a Baby", which were two opening and closing numbers in Tommy Tune's nightclub act. A 1946 musical entitled The Duchess Misbehaves, for which she wrote the book and lyrics, opened at the Adelphi Theater in Manhattan, but managed only three performances before closing.

The song "Oliver Twist", which she co-wrote with Rod McKuen appeared on the same-named single issued on the Spiral label. It was sung by McKuen and in 1961 reached No. 76 on the Billboard pop chart.

== Palisades Amusement Park ==
Shelley married Irving Rosenthal, the owner of New Jersey's Palisades Amusement Park, and in 1960 she wrote the music and lyrics to a radio and television jingle called "Come on Over", which proved to be a catchy and effective promotions device. The jingle was used until the park closed in 1971, rhyming "Palisades Amusement Park" with "swings all day and after dark." Shelley also wrote the theme song for the Little Miss America pageant, which debuted at Palisades Park in 1961 as a children's version of Miss America for girls aged 5 to 10.

== Songs ==
During World War II, she wrote "Bundles for Britain", which Gertrude Lawrence recorded for the war effort.

She is best remembered for the ballad, "How Did He Look?", recorded by over 100 different singers, which launched Eydie Gorme into stardom. She and Abner Silver wrote the plaintive tune, which remained a New York cabaret favorite for more than sixty years and became associated with performer Mabel Mercer. for whom it became a signature song. Other artists covering the tune included Carmen McRae, Eydie Gorme, Julie London, Dakota Staton, Connie Francis, Vic Damone, Arthur Prysock, Kevin Mahogany and Mel Torme. The male versions sang the lyrics as "How Did She Look?"

The recording of "My Country Has Been Good to Me", written and composed by Shelley, was sung by Robert Merrill. He introduced it at the opening of a Yankees game in hopes it would become a pop classic in the tradition of Irving Berlin's "God Bless America."

Shelley wrote Margaret Chase Smith a presidential nomination campaign song for Smith's unsuccessful 1964 campaign for president; the song was called "Leave It to the Girls," and was sung by Hildegarde.

Her song "Peace and Harmony" is in the Smithsonian Institution in Washington, D.C.

Shelley's perennial song, "Christmas is Christmas", recorded by Arthur Godfrey, is used all over the world.

General Motors used her song, "No Man is Going to Change Me", in all the G.M. cassettes.

The song "Oliver Twist" launched Rod McKuen, who co-wrote it with her, into stardom.

Nat "King" Cole recorded her song "Make It Last".

== Death ==
She died at her Manhattan home at age 91. Her death on December 9, 2003, was announced by the American Society of Composers, Authors and Publishers, the agency that licensed her songs. Her New York Times obituary noted that she was a "memorable presence in her East Side neighborhood, where the sight of Ms. Shelley walking her five chihuahuas was a familiar one for many years."

== Broadway ==
- The Duchess Misbehaves, book and lyrics (February 13, 1946 – February 16, 1946)
- Money Mad, performer (May 24, 1937 – May 24, 1937)
- Moon Over Mulberry Street, performer (September 4, 1935 – May 1936)
- Baby Pompadour, performer (December 27, 1934 – Dec 1934)

== Awards ==
- U.S. Committee for UNICEF – "...As thousands of American radio stations broadcast your appeal for the United Nations Children's Fund, you may consider a share of Unicef's Novel Peace Prize as being your own."
- The Laymen's National Bible Committee Award for "If You Don't Know Your Bible You Haven't Got a Prayer."
- The Brotherhood in Action award for "Peace and Harmony"
- Gold Award from the U.S. Army Recruiting Service and she was made an honorary nurse in the U.S. Army for her song "A Nurse in the U.S. Army Corps"
- Her song "Flying Can Be Fun" was used as a theme song by the U.S. Air Force, for which she received an award.
- She was a distinguished member of the ASCAP.
