= Doel =

Ghost town in Belgium

- Village
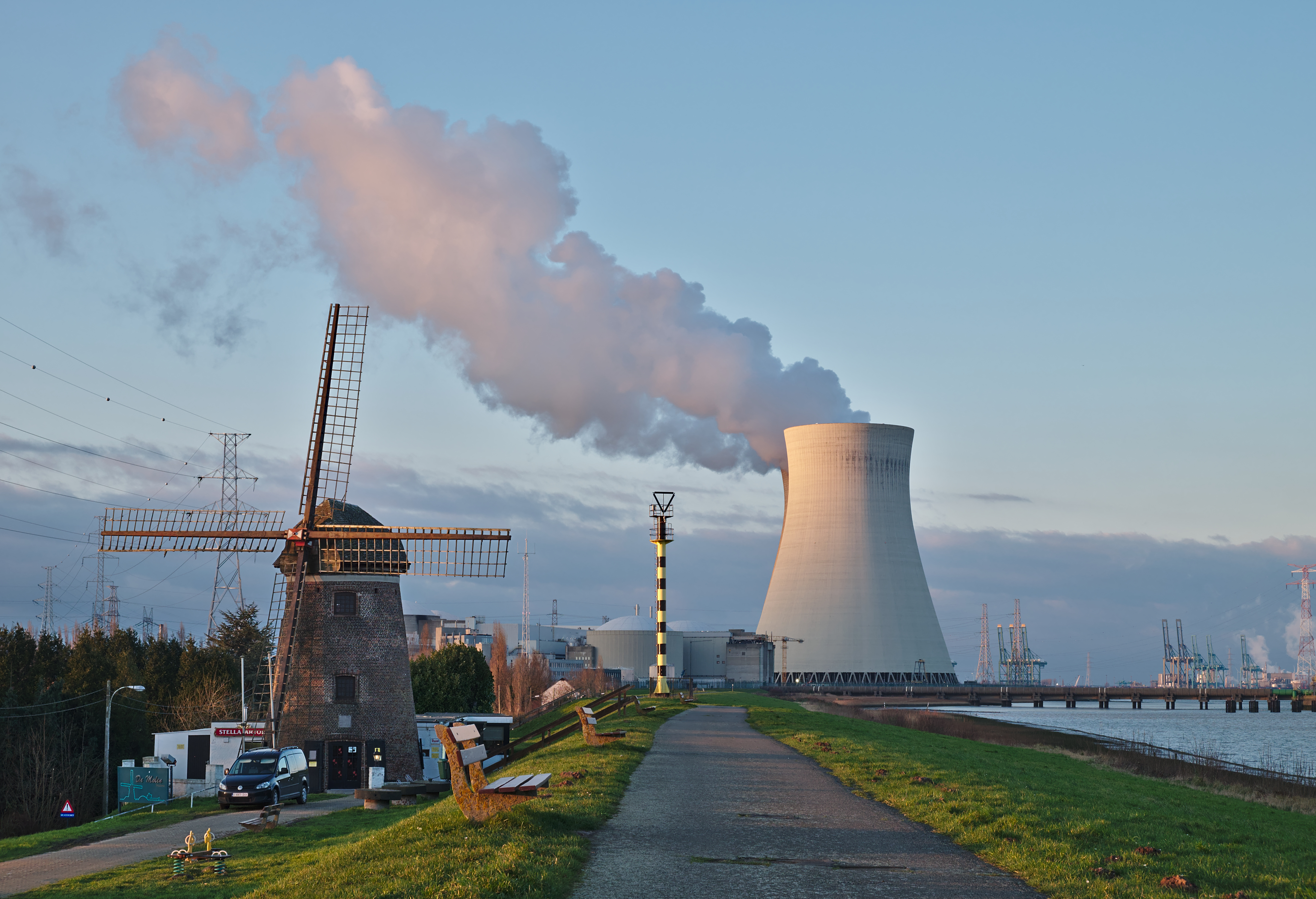
- Doel: Nuclear power plant and 17th century windmill on the Scheldedijk

- Seal

- Location in Belgium
- Coordinates: 51.3099°N 4.2637°E
- Country: Belgium
- Region: Flemish Region
- Province: East Flanders
- Municipality: Beveren

Area
  - Total: 25.60 km^{2} (9.88 sq mi)

Population (2021)
  - Total: 110
  - Density: 4.3/km^{2} (11/sq mi)
- Time zone: CET

Doel is a subdivision of the municipality of Beveren-Kruibeke-Zwijndrecht the Flemish province of East Flanders in Belgium. It is located near the river the Scheldt, in a polder of the Waasland. Since 1965, there have been plans to extend the Port of Antwerp into Doel and demolish the village. However, protests have caused a stalemate. On 30 March 2022, a deal was reached and the village is allowed to exist.

== History ==
The first mention of the village dates from 1267, when "The Doolen" name is first mentioned. Until the 18th century the village was an island surrounded by purposefully flooded land, with the remainder, north of the village, known as "The Drowned Land of Saeftinghe". The "Eylandt den Doel" is completely surrounded by old seawalls. The dike encloses the hamlets of "Saftingen", "Rapenburg" and "Ouden Doel" (Olden Doel).

The Doel polder site is unique to Belgium and dates back to the Eighty Years War (1568–1648). The typical checkerboard pattern dates from 1614, when these geometric farmlands were first mapped, and they have seen little change over the years. This fact makes the village a rare example of regional urbanization. The village has many historic buildings, including the oldest stone windmill of the country (1611), and the only windmill on a sea wall. The Baroque Hooghuis (1613) that is associated with the entourage and holdings of the famous 17th century Antwerp painter, Peter Paul Rubens.

Some of the other historical and cultural buildings in the town area are the "Reynard Farm" (De Reinaerthoeve), with a monumental farmhouse and barn. "De Doolen" is a historic school. "De Putten", or "The Wells", is a peat extraction area and has an historically unique 18th-century farmstead and inn site "The Old Hoefyzer", with one of the last remaining historic barns.

== Doel Nuclear Power Station ==
Electrabel-owned Doel Nuclear Power Station is located to the north of the village of Doel. Its four reactors can produce a total output of 2.9 GW of electricity for consumers in Belgium, France and the Netherlands.

== Doel demolition ==
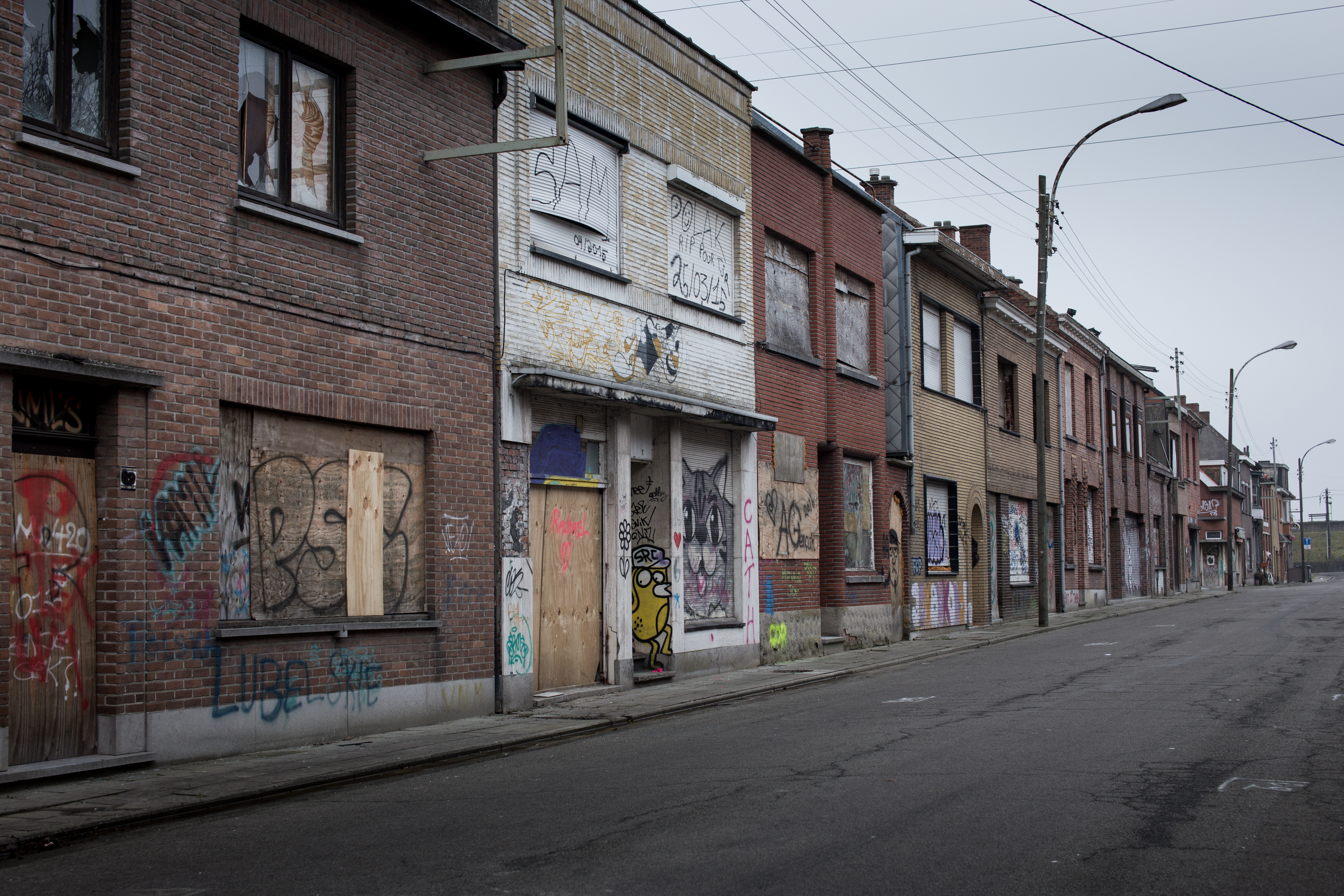
Street view in 2017

Since 1965, there have been plans to enlarge the Port of Antwerp and demolish the village of Doel to be replaced with petrochemical industry. This has seen many people having to sell their homes to the development corporation of that enlargement; however, some people resisted the plans. In the middle of the 1980s, the plans were halted, only to be revived in 1995. Many historic buildings have already been demolished. As of 1 September 2009, people are no longer allowed to live in the village. In 2021, there were still 19 people living in the village and 91 in the surrounding area.

A memorial to British soldiers killed nearby during World War II was removed from the town square during the early morning hours in 2011, according to a BBC report.

On 30 March 2022, a compromise was reached after a 24-year long legal battle. The Port of Antwerp is allowed to extend its container harbour, and the village of Doel is allowed to exist. A green buffer zone will be created between the harbour and the village. The World War II monument will also be returned to its original location.

== Gallery ==
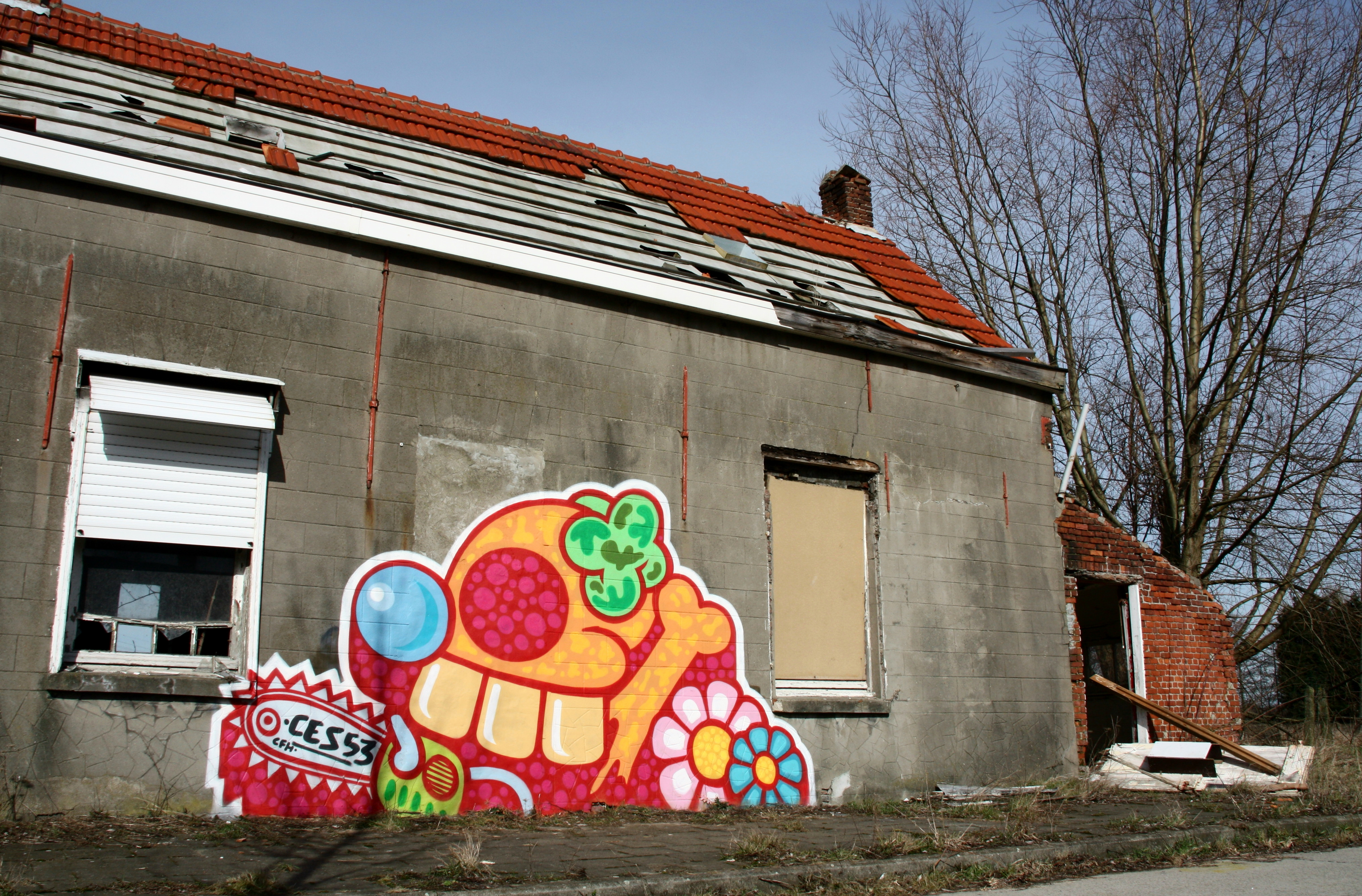
Street art by Ces53 in Doel. Since the depopulation of Doel, it is attracting street artists.

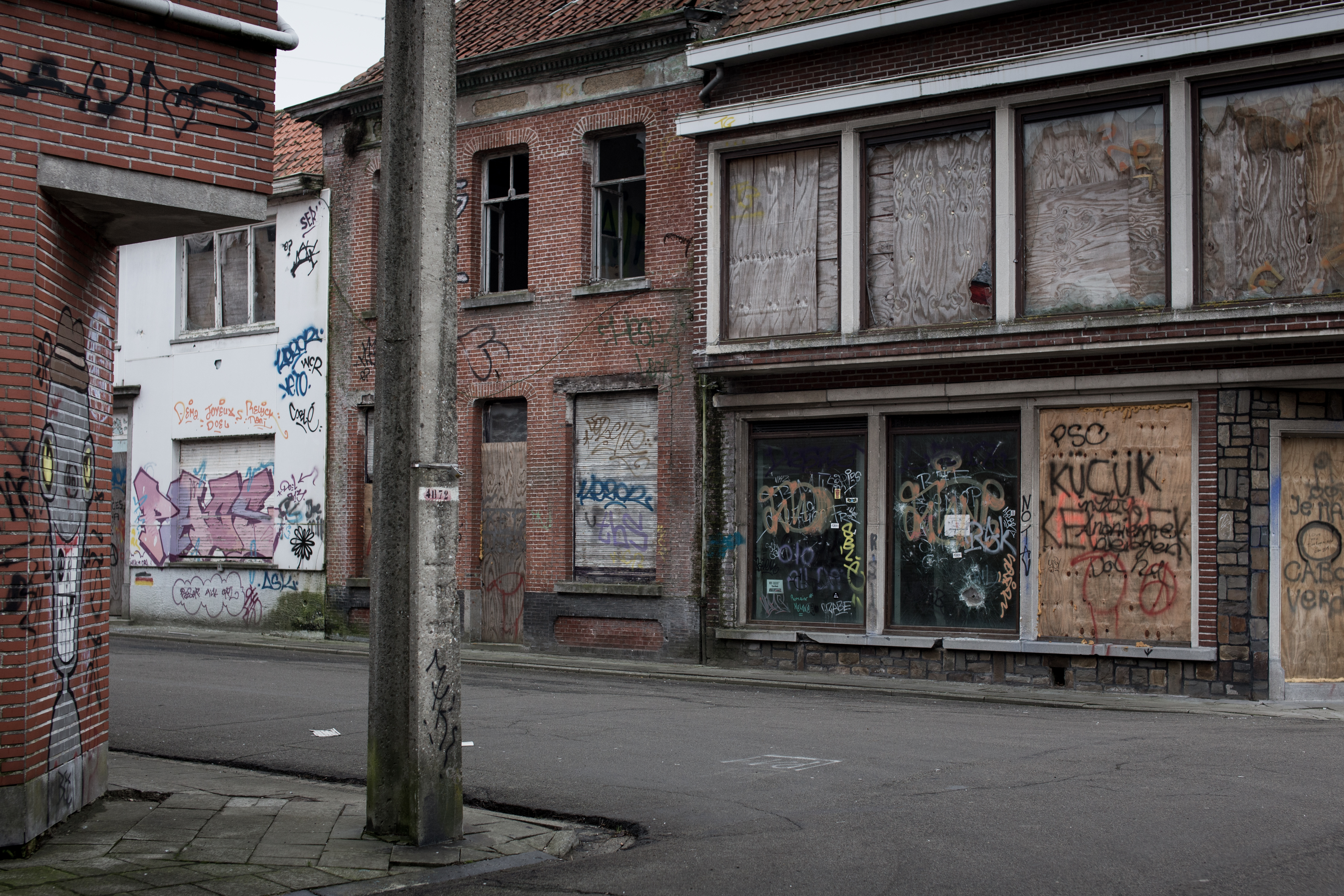
Street view

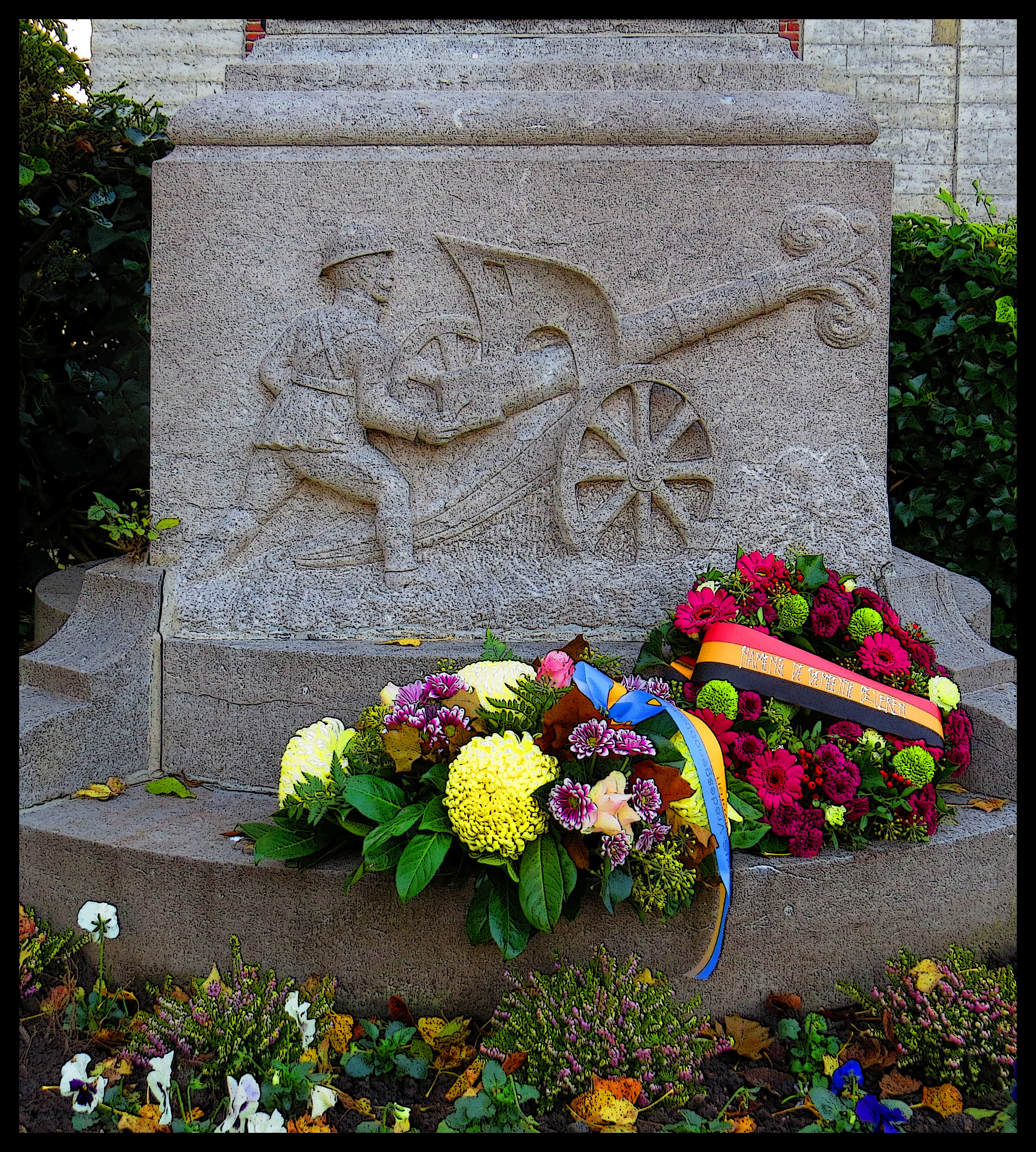
Flowers at the War Memorial

== See also ==
- Ghost town
- Ruigoord
