= Petra Vogt (artist) =

German actor

Petra Vogt is a German actress, visual artist, performance artist, poet and one-time partner of poet and publisher Ira Cohen.

Beginning in 1962, Vogt performed with the experimental Living Theatre in Europe. During the organizations’ period in New York in the late 1960s, she acted in multiple productions directed by Julian Beck and Judith Malina including Frankenstein (1968), Paradise Now (1968), Mysteries and Other Pieces (1968) and Bertold Brecht’s Antigone (1968–1969).

After meeting Ira Cohen, they travelled to Kathmandu, Nepal in 1970 and remained there for many years as member of a thriving community of expatriate European and American artists and writers. With Cohen she worked on publications for the small press Bardo Matrix. Vogt collaborated extensively with Cohen, posing for many of his well-known photographs.

Eventually she moved to India to visit the Aghori babas. She later became a Brahma Kumari nun in Europe.

== Publications ==
Illustration for Paul Bowles, Next to Nothing (Kathmandu: Bardo Matrix, 1976)

Illustrations for Ira Cohen, Poems from the Cosmic Crypt (Kathmandu: Bardo Matrix and Kali Press, 1976)

Illustration and model for photograph in Ira Cohen, From the Divan of Petra Vogt (Rotterdam: Cold Turkey Press, 1976)

Poem in Living Theatre Poems (New York: Boss, 1968)

== Archive ==
Petra Vogt's papers reside at the Albert and Shirley Small Special Collections Library at the University of Virginia.
