= Ins & Outs Press =

English-language publisher

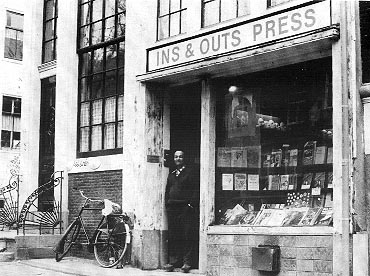
Above: Piero Heliczer at the doorway of Ins & Outs Press, Amsterdam (1981)

Ins & Outs Press is a small English-language publisher with international connections based in Amsterdam and registered in the Netherlands as a cultural foundation, or stichting. It was started in 1980 by Eddie Woods, Jane Harvey, and Henk van der Does as a natural extension of Ins & Outs magazine, the first three issues of which were produced by Woods and Harvey in 1978. For two years the Press also operated a bookstore, located on the 'quiet fringe of the red-light district,' until Van der Does left the organization to start his own bookshop and Woods converted the ground floor of the six-story building into a gallery and performance space.

The Press remained periodically active throughout the 1980s and into the early 1990s. In 1993, with the premises lost the previous year following a series of acrimonious lawsuits with the landlord (and Woods having gone personally bankrupt), Ins & Outs went into a long spell of 'suspended animation' from which it only began emerging (and on a much smaller scale) in 2004.

Among the poets and authors published by Ins & Outs are Allen Ginsberg, Paul Bowles, Harold Norse, Jack Micheline, William Levy, Ira Cohen, Gerard Malanga, Lawrence Ferlinghetti, Bob Kaufman, Charles Henri Ford, Jack Hirschman, Heathcote Williams, Simon Vinkenoog, Rachel Pollack, Gregory Corso, Bob Black, Jan Kerouac, et al.

The current directors of the Ins & Outs Foundation are Eddie Woods and Jane Harvey. Ins & Outs Press has never had any employees, as such: all tasks, on every level, are performed by volunteers. Nor has Ins & Outs ever received state sponsorship in the form of either subsidies or grants; patronage (reasonably substantial over the years) is strictly private.

== Publications ==
- Ins & Outs Magazine issues 1, 2 and 3 (1978).
- Crippled Warlords. Poetry anthology. Edited by Ronald Sauer (1979).
- Manifesto: Cosa Nostra di Poesia. Longpoem by Ronald Sauer (1979)
- Other World Poetry Newsletter. Tabloid-style exposé of the politics of poetry by Woodstock Jones (1979).
- Das Bauen im neuen Reich. Silkscreen print by Kirke Wilson, from a 'bandaged poet' photograph of Jules Deelder by Ira Cohen (1980).
- Ins & Outs magazine no. 4/5 (1980).
- Postcard series. Photographs and drawings by various visual artists, including 14 of Ira Cohen's Bandaged Poets (1980–1981).
- Sale or Return. Poems book by Eddie Woods. Bilingual. Dutch translations by Hans Plomp (1981).
- Natural Jewboy. Collection of prose writings and satirical verse by William Levy, with illustrations by Peter Pontiac (1981).
- Jack Micheline in Amsterdam. Audio cassette of a 1982 live reading at Ins & Outs Press (1983).
- Harold Norse Of Course. Audio cassette of a 1984 live reading at Ins & Outs Press (1985).
- Limited-edition silkscreen print of William S. Burroughs by Kirke Wilson, from a photograph by Ira Cohen (1985).
- Limited-edition silkscreen print of Snuffie, the Gangster Woof of Amsterdam, by Kirke Wilson, from a photograph by Eddie Woods (1987).
- Limited-edition silkscreen print of Herbert Huncke by Kirke Wilson, from a photograph by Peter Edel. Co-published with Soyo Productions, Amsterdam (1987).
- Limited-edition silkscreen print of Allen Ginsberg by Kirke Wilson, from a 'bandaged poet' photograph by Ira Cohen. Co-published with Turret Books, London (1992).
- Limited-edition silkscreen print of Xaviera Hollander by Kirke Wilson, from a photograph by Tony Newitt (1993).
- Dangerous Precipice. Spoken-word poetry CD by Eddie Woods (2004).
- Tsunami of Love: A Poems Cycle. Two long 'letterpoems' plus four shorter poems by Eddie Woods, which together narrate 'the rise and fall of an incredible love affair' (2005).
- Tsunami of Love: A Poems Cycle. CD recording (by Eddie Woods) of the entire Tsunami collection, with a special introduction added (2007).
- Harold Norse Of Course. CD and double-vinyl LP release of Norse's 1984 live reading at Ins & Outs Press. Co-produced with Unrequited Records, San Francisco (2010).
- Herbert Huncke - Guilty of Everything. Double-CD release of Huncke's 1987 live reading at Ins & Outs Press. Co-produced with Unrequited Records, San Francisco (2012).
- Jack Micheline in Amsterdam. CD release of Micheline's 1982 live reading at Ins & Outs Press. Co-produced with Unrequited Records, San Francisco (2012).
