= Ruigoord =

Village in North Holland, Netherlands

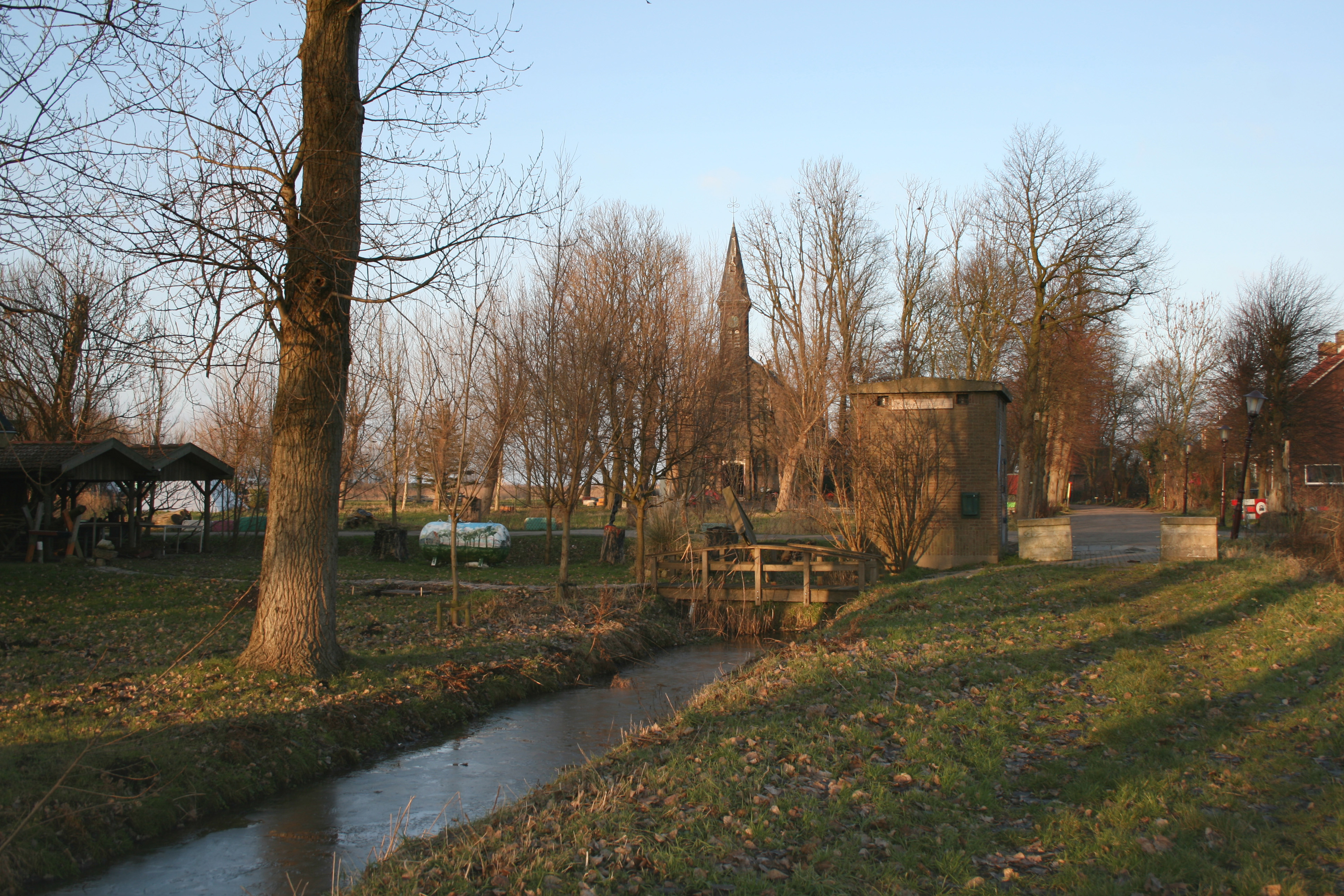
- Ruigoord in 2007

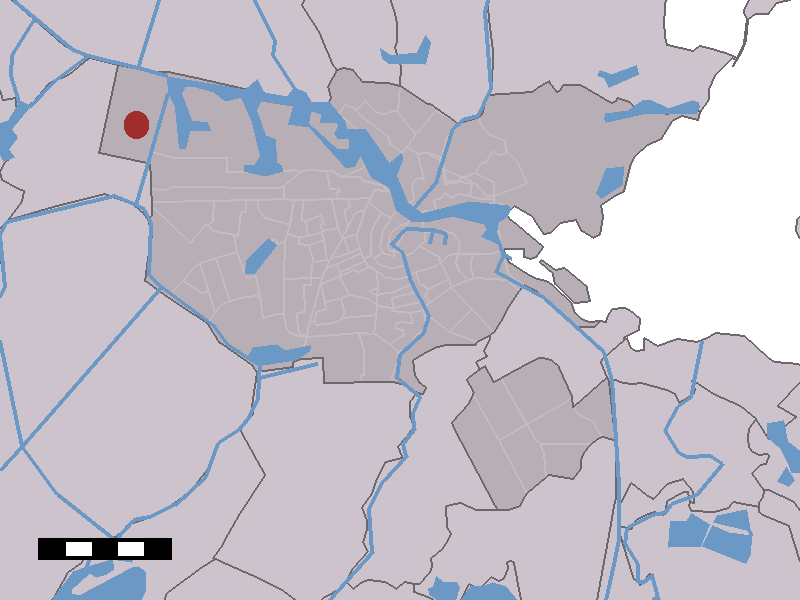
- Ruigoord in the municipality of Amsterdam
- Coordinates: 52.4095°N 4.7490°E
- Country: Netherlands
- Province: North Holland
- Municipality: Amsterdam

Ruigoord (Dutch pronunciation: [ˈrœyx.oːrt]) is a village in the Houtrak polder in North Holland, Netherlands, situated within the municipality of Amsterdam. Until the 1880s, it was an island in the IJ bay, which was turned into a polder. In the 1960s, the municipality planned to extend the Port of Amsterdam. From 1972 onwards squatters occupied buildings and started a free zone. After resisting eviction in 1997, the area was legalized in 2000. The village is nowadays partially closed in by the port, and lies about 8 km (5 miles) east of Haarlem.

== Harbour project ==
In 1964, plans were drawn up by the municipality of Amsterdam to build the Africa Harbour for the petrochemical industry. The plan included the annexation of 600 hectares (1,500 acres) of land belonging to Haarlemmerliede en Spaarnwoude, including the village of Ruigoord. Amsterdam immediately set out to acquire real estate in and around Ruigoord, and started to prepare the farmland for construction.

In 1972, a group of artists squatted some abandoned houses. In 1973, Frank IJsselmuiden became mayor of Haarlemmerliede en Spaarnwoude, and wanted to put the annexation to a vote. The same evening, he received a call from Ferdinand Kranenburg, the Queen's Commissioner of North Holland who told him that annexation was a done deal and not open for discussion. A lengthy legal battle between Haarlemmerliede en Spaarnwoude on the one hand, and Amsterdam and the Province of North Holland on the other hand commenced. For strategic reasons, the squatters were encouraged to settle in Ruigoord.

== 1973 demolition ==
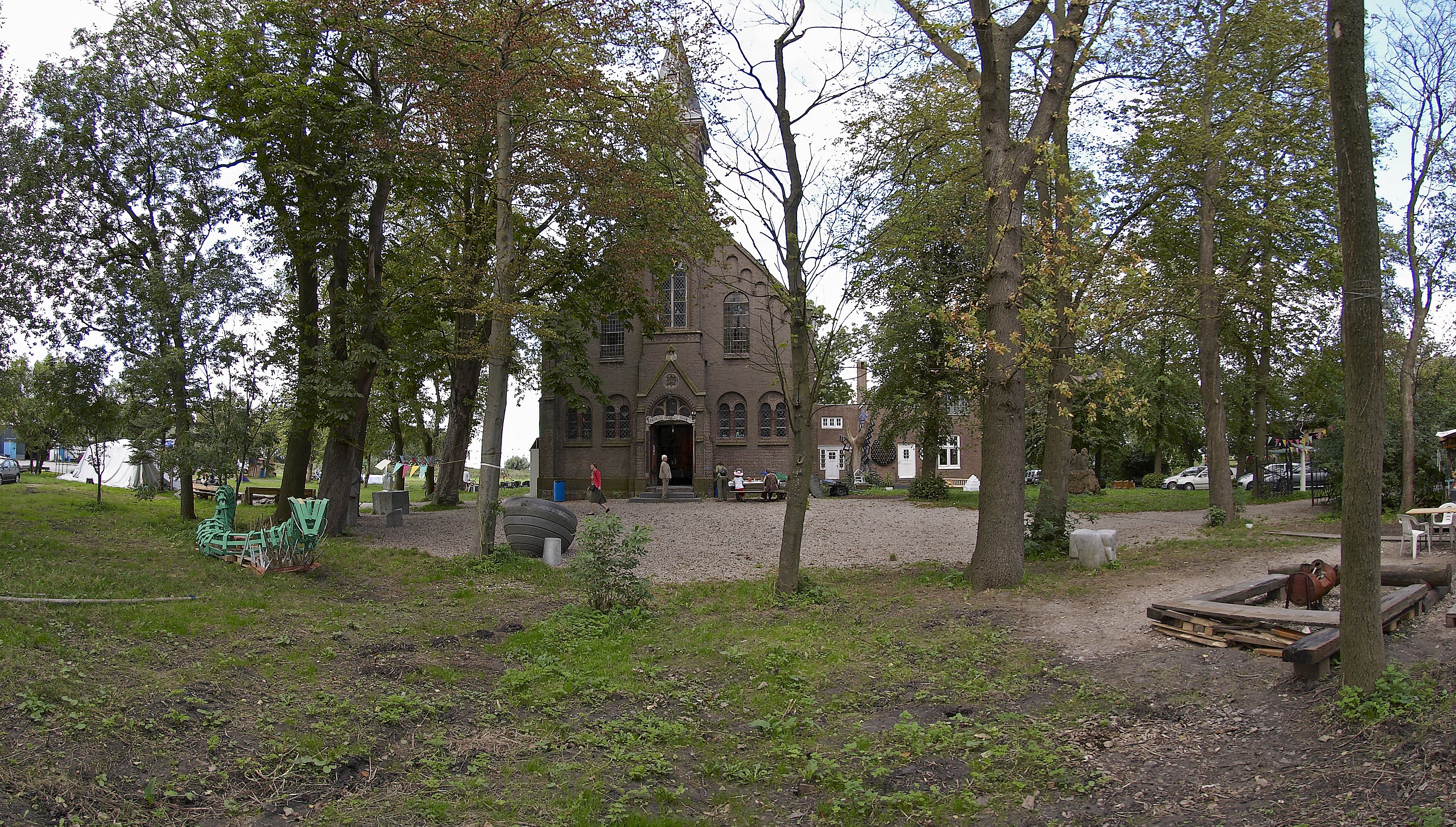
The church of Ruigoord

The village was scheduled to be demolished on 23 July 1973. On Sunday 22 July 1973, the local priest performed his last mass, and handed the keys of the church to the squatters. The next day, the road to the village was barricaded, and the squatters led by Hans Plomp and Gerben Hellinga successfully managed to stop the demolition crew. The 1973 oil crisis further complicated the Africa Harbour project.

Ruigoord became a free zone and started to attract artists like Simon Vinkenoog. It also became known for its drugs. In 1984, Haarlemmerliede en Spaarnwoude tried to change the village into a "green zone" where industry is not allowed, but the plans were blocked by the Province. In November 1995, mayor IJsselmuiden accepted an offer to become mayor of Edam-Volendam. His main reason for resigning was the tiresome 22-year legal battle with Amsterdam.

== Annexation ==
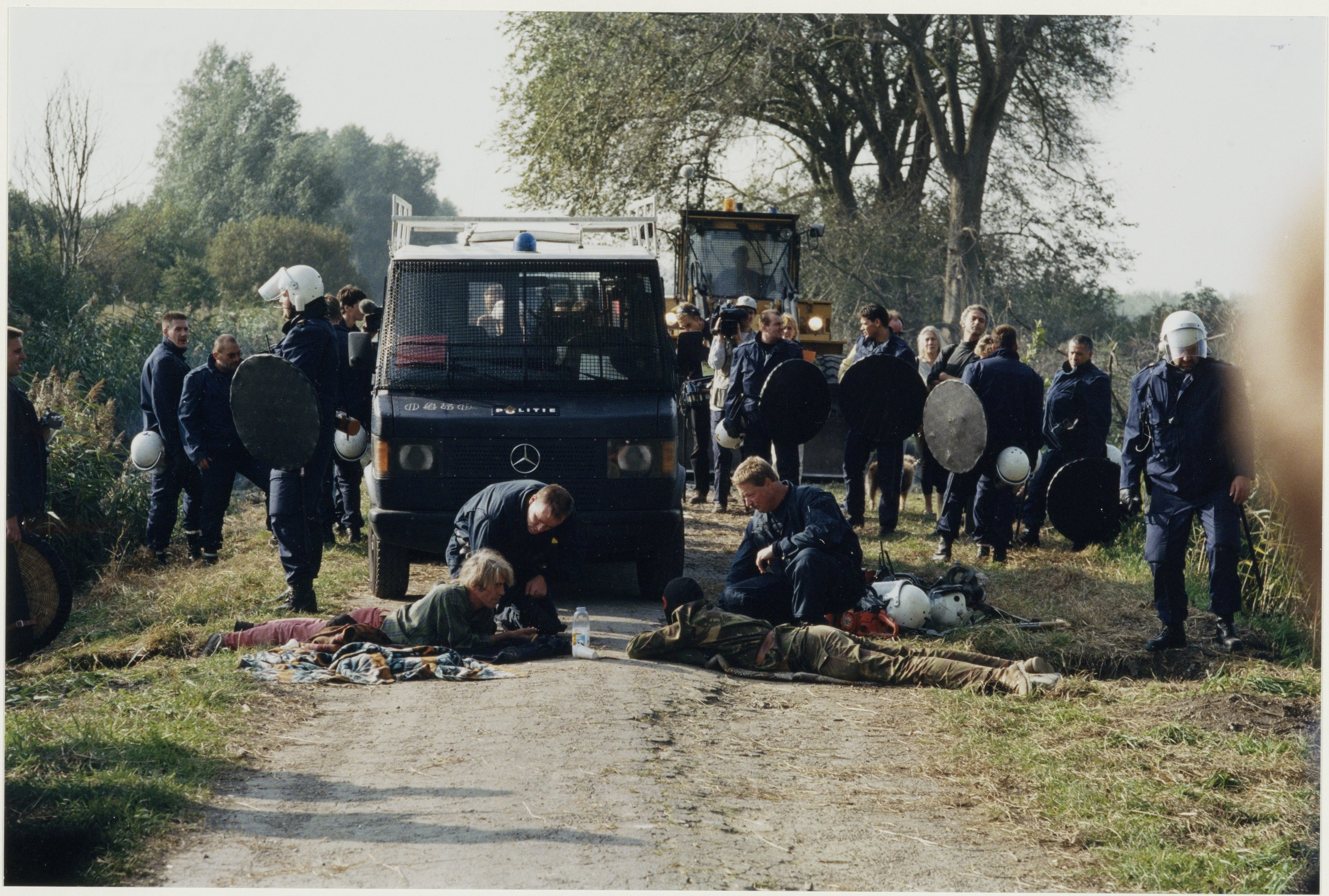
1997 police action

On 1 January 1997, Amsterdam annexed Ruigoord. The squatters decided to continue their fight against the harbour, and started the Groenoord plan to turn the village into an ecological zone. On 7 October 1997, 200 policemen of the Mobiele Eenheid, the Dutch riot squad, were sent into Ruigoord to remove the squatters. The entire area, except for the village, was flattened and prepared for construction by the Port of Amsterdam. The legal battle advanced all the way to Court of Justice of the European Union.

In 2000, a compromise was reached. The village of Ruigoord was allowed to exist as an enclave within the harbour. Initially, Amsterdam did not want to allow residency in the village.

== Current situation ==
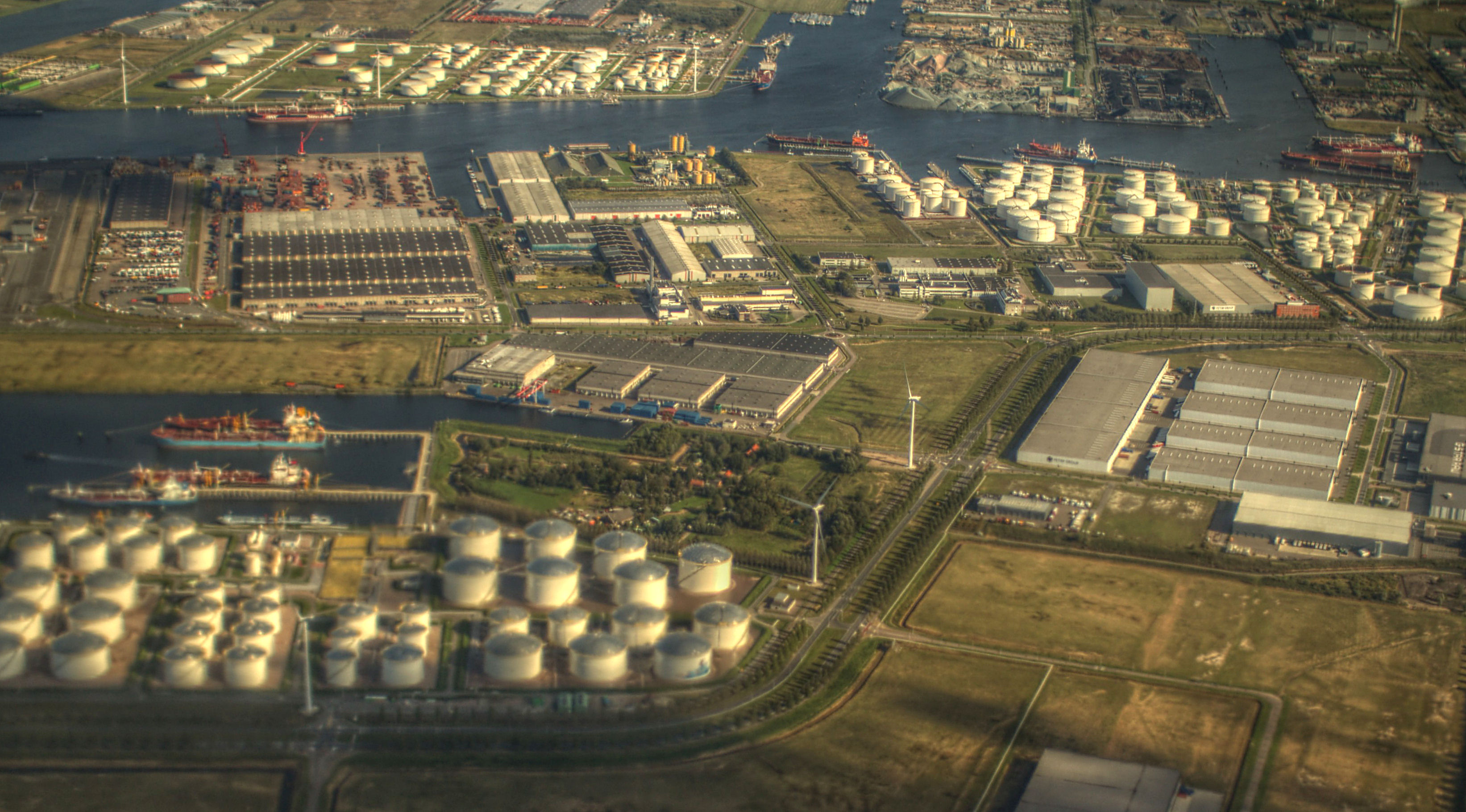
Ruigoord as an enclave in the harbour.

Ruigoord exists as a squatted zone to this day, but it is now legalized. Full moon parties are regularly organised in the formerly Roman Catholic village church and every year there is the Landjuweel (Land Jewel) festival in August.

Since the early 2000s, the village has staged an annual poetry festival over the Whitsun weekend, Vurige tongen (Fiery Tongues). One of the festival's three days is always devoted to international poets. From 2003 on, a yearly Ruigoord Trophy has been awarded to individuals who have selflessly dedicated themselves to maintaining the village as an important cultural stronghold. The first such trophy was presented to Simon Vinkenoog. Three notable non-Dutch trophy holders are the late American poet and photographer Ira Cohen, the Canada-born writer Jordan Zinovich, and the Amsterdam-based American poet and writer Eddie Woods.

== See also ==
- Doel
- Freetown Christiania
- Metelkova
- Squatting in the Netherlands
