= International Times =

Underground newspapers

- The 14-Hour Technicolor Dream issue (Apr. 1967)
- Editor: various
- Categories: Newspaper
- Frequency: fortnightly
- First issue: 1966
- Country: United Kingdom
- Language: English
- Website: www.internationaltimes.it

International Times (it or IT) is the name of various underground newspapers, with the original title founded in London in 1966 and running until October 1973. Editors included John "Hoppy" Hopkins, David Mairowitz, Roger Hutchinson, Peter Stansill, Barry Miles, Jim Haynes and playwright Tom McGrath. Jack Moore, avant-garde writer William Levy and Mick Farren, singer of The Deviants, also edited at various periods.

The paper's logo is a black-and-white image of Theda Bara, vampish star of silent films. The founders' intention had been to use an image of actress Clara Bow, 1920s It girl, but a picture of Theda Bara was used by accident and, once deployed, not changed. Paul McCartney donated to the paper as did Allen Ginsberg through his Committee on Poetry foundation.

The IT restarted first as an online archive in 2008, a move arranged by former IT editor and contributor Mike Lesser and financed by Littlewoods heir James Moores, and in 2011 relaunched as an online magazine publishing new material, following a suggestion by Lesser to poet and actor Heathcote Williams. Irish poet Niall McDevitt served as the first online editor of IT, a position later held by Williams until his death in 2017.

== History ==
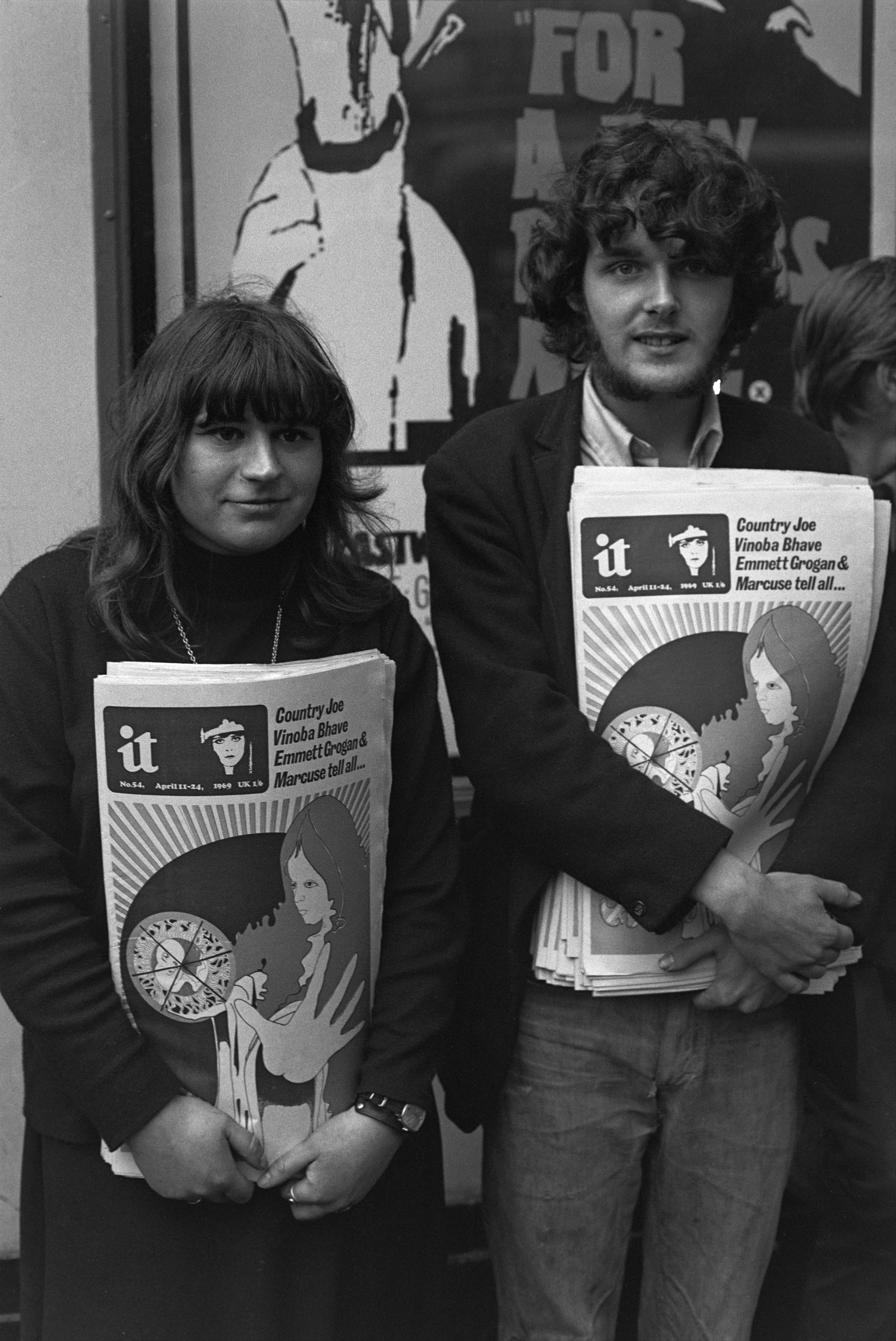
International Times newspapers for sale in London in 1969

International Times was launched on 15 October 1966 at The Roundhouse at an 'All Night Rave' featuring Soft Machine and Pink Floyd. The event promised a 'Pop/Op/Costume/Masque/Fantasy-Loon/Blowout/Drag Ball' featuring 'steel bands, strips, trips, happenings, movies'. The launch was described by Daevid Allen of Soft Machine as "one of the two most revolutionary events in the history of English alternative music and thinking. The IT event was important because it marked the first recognition of a rapidly spreading socio-cultural revolution that had its parallel in the States."

From April 1967, and for some while later, the police raided the offices of International Times to try, it was alleged, to force the paper out of business. A benefit event labelled The 14 Hour Technicolor Dream took place at Alexandra Palace on 29 April 1967. Bands included Pink Floyd, The Pretty Things, The Crazy World of Arthur Brown, Soft Machine, The Move, and Sam Gopal Dream. Despite police harassment, the paper continued to grow, with financial help from Paul McCartney, a personal friend of editor Barry Miles. Published fortnightly, it became the leading British underground paper, its circulation peaking at around 40,000 copies in late 1968/early 1969, before another police raid, along with competition from newer publications such as Time Out led to declining sales and a financial crisis.

In response to another raid on the paper's offices, London's alternative press on one occasion succeeded, somewhat astonishingly, in pulling off what was billed as a "reprisal attack" on the police—prompting the Evening Standard headline "Raid on the Yard". The paper Black Dwarf published a detailed floor-by-floor guide to Scotland Yard, complete with diagrams, descriptions of locks on particular doors and snippets of overheard conversation in the offices of Special Branch. The anonymous author, or "blue dwarf," as he styled himself, described how he perused police files, and even claimed to have sampled named brands of whisky in the Commissioner's office. A day or two later The Daily Telegraph announced that the "raid" had forced the police to withdraw and re-issue all security passes.

In 1970 a group of people from IT, led by photographer Graham Keen, launched Cyclops, "The First English Adult Comic Paper."

== Later publications ==
IT first ceased publication in October 1973, after being convicted for running contact ads for gay men. The name was revived by another publisher in May 1974 for three issues until October. In 1975, Maya, another underground publication, temporarily renamed itself IT - the International Times, until that title closed after the November issue. A new title of the same name launched the following month, continuing until March 1976 when it went into hiatus until resuming in January 1977, ceasing in August of that year.

Publications with the International Times title were published from January to December 1978, and again from April 1979 to June 1980. A single 'festival issue' was produced in June 1982. The title was again revived in 1986, with three issues from January to March, the last time a paper publication of the IT name was printed.

The IT restarted as an online archive in 2008, a move arranged by former IT editor and contributor Mike Lesser and financed by Littlewoods heir James Moores. In 2011 it was relaunched as an online magazine publishing new material, following a suggestion by Lesser to poet and actor Heathcote Williams.

Irish poet Niall McDevitt served as the first online editor of IT, a position later held by Heathcote Williams until his death in 2017. In 2016, the 50th anniversary of the first copy of the magazine, further editions of a paper version of IT began to be published starting with issue Zero. These were edited by Heathcote Ruthven.

International Times has also published two books. Both are poetry collections – Royal Babylon by Heathcote Williams, an attack on the British monarchy, and Porterloo by Niall McDevitt, a book satirising the Conservative Party and registering the counterculture of 2011-12.

Current editor-in-chief is Nick Victor.

== Contributors ==
Issue Number 8, February 1967

Many people who became prominent UK figures wrote for IT, including feminist critic Germaine Greer, poet and social commentator Jeff Nuttall, occultist Kenneth Grant, and DJ John Peel. There were many original contributions from underground writers such as Alexander Trocchi; William Burroughs and Allen Ginsberg.

Leading editorial contributors to the late 1970s IT were Heathcote Williams, Max Handley, Mike Lesser, Eddie Woods (Amsterdam editor), and Chris Sanders.

In 1986 IT was relaunched by Tony Allen and Chris Brook. After three issues (Volume 86; issues 1,2,3) Allen left, and Brook continued with one more issue (Volume 86; issue 4). After various one-off issues into 1991, 2000 saw Brook and others create a web-based presence—initially through the alternative server 'Phreak', c. 1996.

There are currently two archive sources online: 1) a comprehensive archive scanned by previous contributors and editors, and a less extensive archive with some commentary.

== International Times archive ==
International Times (NIIT) Archive is a free online archive of every issue of the International Times. It runs from a precursor to IT, The Longhair Times, released on April Fools' Day 1966 to an erroneously labelled 'last issue'—a Xeroxed single sheet issue in 1994. The continuum of this journal, in fact, includes issues and web presence from the last editorial group (IT#4 Vol 1986) until the present day.

The IT Archive was launched on 16 July 2009 at the Idea Generation Gallery.

The IT Archive was founded by Mike Lesser supported by fellow contributors and editors of IT including Mick Farren, John "Hoppy" Hopkins, Dave Mairowitz, Peter Stansill and Heathcote Williams amongst others.

== See also ==
- Hapshash and the Coloured Coat
- List of underground newspapers of the 1960s counterculture

== Sources ==
- Turner, C. (27 April 1997). Personal memories of The 14 Hour Technicolor Dream
