= Steve Fiorilla =

American artist (1961–2009)

Fiorilla's creation for the MTV logo "Guillotine"

Steve Fiorilla (January 12, 1961 – July 29, 2009) was an American artist born in Paterson, New Jersey, who lived and worked in Buffalo, New York. Throughout his career, Fiorilla emphasized the grotesque and surreal in illustrations, sculpture and fine art. As a sculptor, he produced a variety of bizarre, malformed creatures. His film reviews appeared under the pseudonym Jacques Corédor.

== Print ==
Fiorilla illustrated for books and magazines (Heavy Metal, Video Games and Computer Entertainment, High Times), T-shirts, small press journals (Eegah!, Magick Theatre, Moody Street Irregulars), catalog covers (Gregg Press), fanzines (Horror from the Crypt of Fear) and mini-comics (City Scenes). One of his 1985 sculptures was featured 12 years later on a cover for the magazine Bloodsongs (1997).

He created numerous drawings and product designs for Ed "Big Daddy" Roth, including a belt buckle, T-shirts, caps, ads and catalog illustrations. Fiorilla sometimes worked in tandem with illustrator Jim McDermott, such as their collaboration for Stephen J. Spignesi's The Complete Stephen King Encyclopedia (1991).

== Film and television ==
Fiorilla's work for films included sculptural designs for Boston's Olive Jar Animation. The short film Things Never Seen (1989), with creatures designed by Fiorilla, received multiple showings on MTV during the 1980s and 1990s. In addition to special effects makeup for videos (Tennie Komar and the Silencers) and films (Winterbeast, 1991), he designed masks for Death Studios and horror films, including Saturday the 14th (1981) and Till Death Do We Scare (1982).

The MTV animated logo "Guillotine" featured a sculpted horror by Fiorilla, and he also created the customized skeleton guitar writhing in a popular 1987 Dokken video seen on MTV.

EC Comics publisher Bill Gaines owned one of Fiorilla's latex masks depicting EC's Old Witch (The Haunt of Fear). In the second season of HBO's Tales from the Crypt anthology television series, a photo of this Old Witch mask was a prop in the June 26, 1990 "Korman's Kalamity" episode, adapted from the EC story "Kamen's Kalamity". Illustrated by Jack Kamen, the original self-satirical story is set in EC's offices where the EC editors have a meeting with Kamen about his artwork.

== Miscellaneous work ==
Fiorilla's interpretation of EC Comics' Old Witch

Buffalo's Low Down Dirty Low Brow Art Show was a 2002 group exhibition "inspired by the artwork of Steve Fiorilla", although he did not participate in the show. Fiorilla's articles and reviews were published in the online magazine, Flickhead. He also did film reviews under the pseudonym Jacques Corédor (a pun on Samuel Fuller's film Shock Corridor).

Fee Fie Foe... Fiorilla! is a blog displaying Fiorilla's characters in a surreal narrative setting.

Steve Fiorilla died on July 29, 2009, in Buffalo at the age of 48.
