= Hans Plomp =

Dutch poet, playwright and writer (1944–2024)

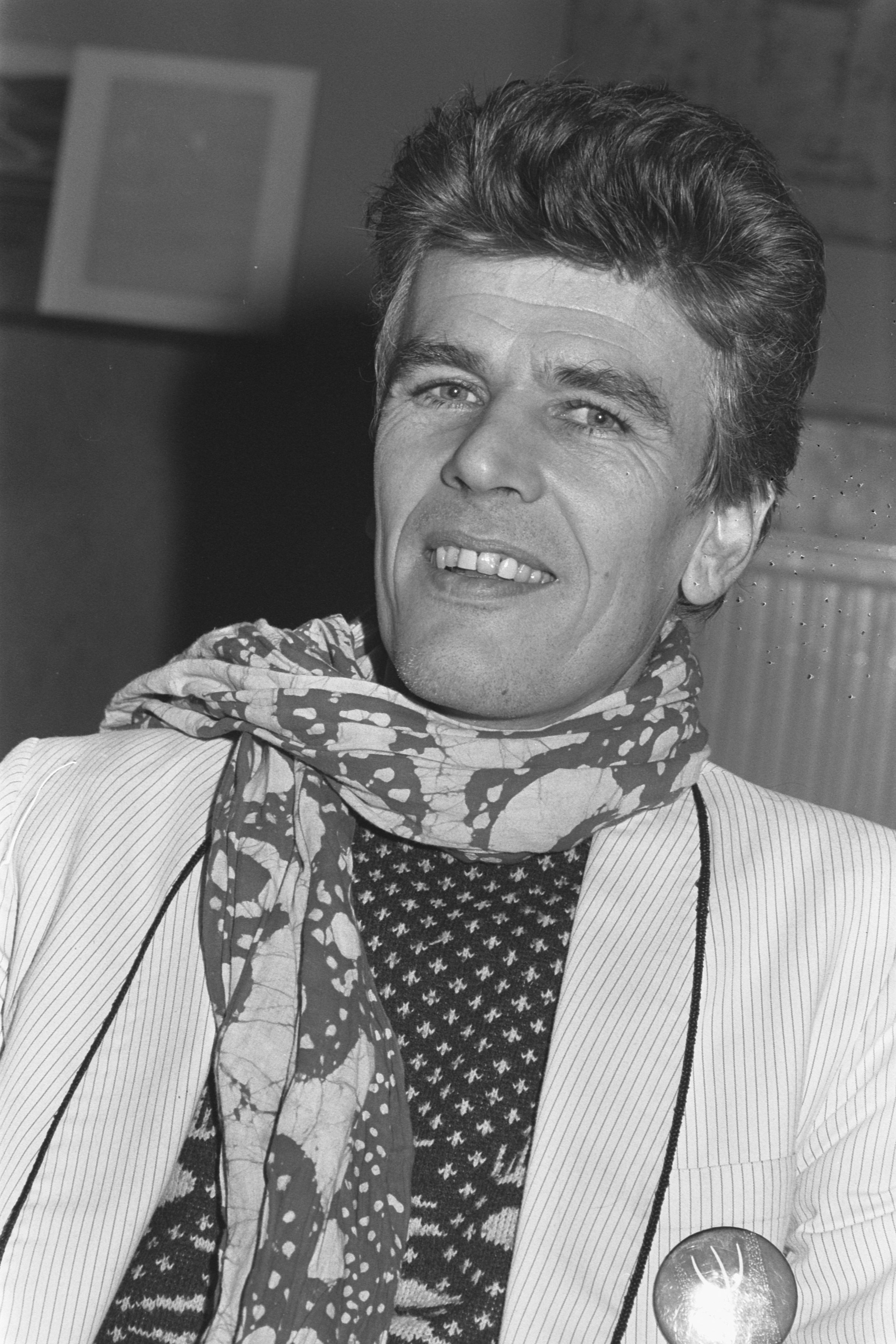
Plomp in 1987

Hans Plomp (29 January 1944 – 6 August 2024) was a Dutch writer, playwright, and poet. Plomp was born in Amsterdam. Together with fellow writer Gerben Hellinga, he was the driving force behind saving the village of Ruigoord near Amsterdam from demolition in July 1973. He was a member of the Amsterdam Balloon Society.

Plomp died on 6 August 2024, at the age of 80. He had been battling metastasized prostate cancer from 2021, and had already discussed the option of euthanasia (Note: Not known if it's euthanasia or assisted suicide.) with his doctor.
