= Irving Rosenthal =

Amusement company owner

- Born: December 5, 1895; Russia
- Died: December 27, 1973 (aged 78); New York City, US
- Education: New York University College of Dentistry
- Known for: Palisades Amusement Park
- Spouse: Gladys Shelley

Irving Rosenthal (December 5, 1895 – December 27, 1973) was an amusement company owner who, along with his brother Jack Rosenthal, operated the Palisades Amusement Park near Cliffside Park and Fort Lee, New Jersey, from 1934 until its closing in 1971.

== Early life ==
Rosenthal was born in Russia and immigrated to the United States in 1902, two years after an older brother and sister settled in New York. By 1910, the Rosenthal household on East 175th Street in the Bronx included widowed mother Jennie (b. 1864), Abraham Rosenthal (b. 1883), Florence Rosenthal (b. 1886), Rebecca Rosenthal (b. 1887), Mollie Rosenthal (b. 1888), Samuel Rosenthal (1891–1967), Celia Rosenthal (b. 1891-died June 30, 1926, during child birth. Gave birth to a daughter, named Celia), Jacob Rosenthal (b. 1892), and Irving Rosenthal (1895–1973). With the exception of Jacob and Irving, the Rosenthal family was employed in the leather and garment trade. Early on, Jacob Rosenthal worked as a musician with the Russian Symphony in New York, while Irving Rosenthal studied music and worked at odd jobs.

== Education ==
Following his primary and secondary education in New York, Irving Rosenthal paid his tuition at New York University College of Dentistry by working as a trumpeter and violinist. He graduated from the school, but never practiced the profession.

== Early employment ==
As a child, Irving sold newspapers on the Lower East Side to aid his widowed mother. In 1905, he borrowed $50 as start-up funding in a venture to sell souvenir pails and shovels at Steeplechase Park. The venture reaped a $1,500 profit. Within a few years, he and his brother Jacob - who was later known as Jack - bought a second-hand merry-go-round which they operated at the Savin Rock Park in West Haven, Connecticut, which they claimed netted a profit of $11,000. In 1927, Irving and Jack Rosenthal built at a cost of $146,000 The Cyclone roller coaster at Coney Island. Irving also operated the Golden City Park Arena in Canarsie, Brooklyn, and featured the debut fights in the boxing careers of Canada Lee, Tony Canzoneri, and Izzy Grove.

== Palisades Amusement Park ==
In 1934, Irving and Jack Rosenthal leased the Palisades Amusement Park from Nicholas Schenck the M-G-M mogul and his brother Joseph Schenck when they began working with theatre chain owner Marcus Loew. In 1935, the Rosenthal brothers bought the park for $450,000. The attraction flourished under their management and drew more than four million visitors each summer. Among the attractions he featured at the park were such big-name bands as Harry James, Benny Goodman, the Dorsey Brothers, Xavier Cugat, and recording stars such as Tony Bennett, Vic Damone, and The Supremes. Such novelties as the 'diaper derby,' a crawling race for babies, junior beauty pageants, and three-ring circuses were among the innovations Irving Rosenthal introduced at Palisades Amusement Park. At the height of his career, Rosenthal employed more than 1,600 workers at the park.

== Other enterprises ==
Rosenthal annually hosted the Police Anchor Club outings to the park, which enabled more than 11,000 New York orphans to visit the attraction. As a benefactor of the New York Association for Brain Injured Children, a home in Kerhonkson, New York, was named for him. At one time, Rosenthal owned the Royal York Hotel in Miami, Florida, and a chain of movie theaters.

== Marriage ==
Irving Rosenthal was married to Gladys Shelley, a lyricist and composer of more than 300 songs, whose How Did He Look? remained a favorite of New York night-club singers for more than 60 years. In 1965, she penned the words and music for the advertising jingle "Come On Over" for her husband's enterprise, which rhymed 'Palisades Amusement Park' with 'swings all day and after dark.'

== Death ==
In 1971, Irving Rosenthal sold the 38-acre (150,000 m^{2}) Palisades Amusement Park to the Centex Winston Corporation for $12.5 million to develop high-rise apartments, but continued working as chairman of Action Ads, Inc., an advertising firm. He was also involved in real estate and amusement developments. He died of a heart attack at his Manhattan home on Thursday, December 27, 1973.
