= Beat Scene =

Beat Scene is a UK-based magazine dedicated to the work, the history and the cultural influences of the Beat Generation. As well the best known and more obscure Beat novelists and poets this has included artists, musicians filmmakers and publishers. The content largely consists of articles, memoirs, interviews and reviews.

Beat Scene was founded in 1988 by editor and publisher Kevin Ring in Coventry, England. His personal fascination for the Beat Generation, in particular Jack Kerouac, was sparked in 1971, but he was frustrated that information about Beat writers and their books was hard to come by in the UK at that time.

Ring and Beat Scene are acknowledged sources in James Campbell's book, This Is the Beat Generation: New York–San Francisco-Paris. (2001).

== Early issues ==
The first Beat Scene and subsequent four issues were thin A5 booklets. Initially, there were only 200 copies produced and hand assembled on Ring's kitchen table. As well as the principal Beat writers: Kerouac, William S. Burroughs, Allen Ginsberg and Gary Snyder, the magazine has featured Lord Buckley, James Jones, Chet Baker, Richard Brautigan, Lew Welch, Lawrence Ferlinghetti, Lenny Bruce, Michael McClure, Ken Kesey, Jack Hirschman, Raymond Carver, Robert Frank, Gregory Corso, Diane Di Prima, Philip Whalen, Jack Micheline, Carolyn Cassady (who was the first of the magazine's interview subjects) and many others. The poet and Kerouac biographer Tom Clark has contributed to the magazine but was also interviewed by Ring.

Charles Bukowski was frequently mentioned in the early issues and when issue 9 was in preparation Ring received an unsolicited letter from the Los Angeles-based poet and novelist along with a parcel of previously unpublished poems. These were offered for publication at the magazine's usual rate, which at the time amounted to a few complimentary copies. Over the years Bukowski continued to contribute poems to the magazine and issue 12 included a flexi-disc of him reading. Bukowski was interviewed by Ring for Beat Scene and its sister magazine, Transit. After Bukowski died in 1994 Ring compiled a memorial issue. There was another special issue in 2004, to mark the tenth anniversary of Bukowski's death. More recently there has been an expanded THE BEATS IN BRITAIN issue of the magazine.

== Contributors ==
Beat Scene's many regular contributors have included, Jim Burns, Colin Cooper, Eric Jacobs, Brian Dalton, Anne Waldman, David Meltzer, Jack Foley, Ann Charters, David Holzer, Jed Birmingham.

In December 2006, a special, unnumbered issue was devoted to a new edition of Iain Sinclair's Kodak Mantra Diaries, which included new material and recently discovered period photos.

Alongside the magazine, Ring operates The Beat Scene Press , which specialises in publishing classic Beat interviews or new, longer articles on Beat culture. This includes a series of limited edition chapbooks, usually signed and numbered. Amongst those in the series there has been texts by or about Dan Fante, Snyder, Burroughs, Ginsberg, Bukowski, Clark, Tom Clark, Iain Sinclair, Alan Moore, Joyce Johnson, Gregory Corso, Kerouac, John Clellon Holmes, Lew Welch, Philip Whalen, Philip Lamantia, Peter Coyote, Michael McClure and Richard Brautigan.

The number 60 issue was a Jack Kerouac special and there has been a special 'Beats in England' issue. & a William Burroughs special in more recent times.This series is fast approaching 80 issues. The most recent being Jack Kerouac - Lonesome Traveller in London, 1957 - by Ann Charters.

Beat Scene has an occasional companion magazine Transit with contributions from Michael McClure, David Meltzer, Diane di Prima, Joanne Kyger, Janine Pommy Vega, Barry Gifford, Jack Hirschman, Ruth Weiss, Tom Clark.

== See also ==
- Moody Street Irregulars, edited and published by Joy Walsh during the 1970s and 1980s.
- List of literary magazines
