= William Levy (author) =

American poet (1939–2019)

- Born: January 10, 1939
- Died: April 22, 2019 (aged 80)
- Education: University of Maryland, College Park; Temple University
- Occupations: Writer; editor; radio personality
- Spouse: Susan Janssen

William Levy (January 10, 1939 – April 22, 2019), also known as the Talmudic Wizard of Amsterdam, was an American writer, editor, and former radio personality, plus the author of such works as The Virgin Sperm Dancer, Wet Dreams, Certain Radio Speeches of Ezra Pound and Natural Jewboy.

Before leaving the U.S. in the autumn of 1966 aboard the R.M.S Queen Mary, Levy attended the University of Maryland, College Park and Temple University, and taught in the literature department at Shippensburg State College, in Pennsylvania.

In the Sixties and Seventies, he was founder and chief editor of many magazines, including the Insect Trust Gazette, International Times, Suck, and The Fanatic. Later, he served as European Editor for American glossy magazines High Times and Penthouse, and as an associate editor of Amsterdam zines Het Gewicht, Ins & Outs, La Linea and Atom Club. Levy was a regular contributor to Andrei Codrescu's Exquisite Corpse and Libido. He also published his own Transactions of the Invisible Language Society series. His meditation play Europe in Flames was also featured at the Festival of New Radio in New York. In 1998, Levy was awarded the Erotic Oscar for writing at London's Sex Maniac's Ball. For 20 years until his retirement from radio, Levy's alter-ego, Dr. Doo Wop, could be heard weekly spinning groovy music across Amsterdam's airwaves.

Until his death following a long illness, Levy lived in Amsterdam with his wife, the literary translator Susan Janssen (translator of many works of Charles Bukowski and of F. Scott Fitzgerald's The Great Gatsby).

== Selected works ==
- Playing Tennis with Kafka
- Have Rock Will Roll
- Confessions of a Failed Dealer
- France: Oxygen, a Thirsty (American-in-Paris) Satori
- Refugee TV
- A Call for Chaos & Beans On Toast, Please!
- Poetry and Pensees
- Three Poems
- Dear George W Bush
- Virgin Sperm Dancer
- Wet Dreams
- Certain Radio Speeches of Ezra Pound
- Souvenir Programme for the Official Lynching of Michael Abdul Malik (with John Michell)
- Jeremiad Chants
- Natural Jewboy (Ins & Outs Press, Amsterdam, 1981)
- Voicings and Transmissions
- Radio Art
- Blood
- Rape
- An Introduction to Political Porno in Europe
- A Vilna Legend
- The Night Before Charisma
- Billy's Holiday
- Viagra Blues
- Is There Sex Over Forty?
- Impossible: The Otto Muehl Story (New York: Barany Artists, 2001)
- Never Knew Never From Less: Secondary Raw Materials of Harry Hoogstraten
- ZOCK: The Outlaw Manifesto of the Century
- Death of a Gunslinger: An Obituary on Ed Dorn for America
- Hanging Out With Zalman Shneour
- Two Mornings in Amsterdam Pt. 1 Lost Soles
- Fourth and Fifteen & A Poet's Guide to Fashion
- The Beast of Britain Minstrel Show
- The Fortunate Traveller (2019)
