= St. Nicholas Church (Manhattan) =

Demolished church in Manhattan, New York

Coordinates: 40.723°N 73.986°W

- Church of St. Nicholas
- Deutsche Römisch-Katholische St. Nicolaus Kirche
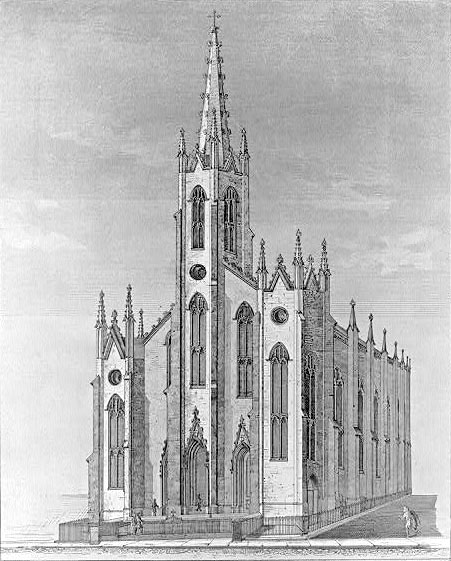
- Engraving of exterior of the second St. Nicholas Church from 1848
- St. Nicholas Church
- Address: 127 East 2nd Street, New York, N.Y.
- Country: United States

History
- Status: demolished
- Founded: 1833
- Founder: Johann Stephen Raffeiner
- Dedication: Saint Nicholas
- Dedicated: April 3, 1836 (first church), December 24, 1848 (second church)

Architecture
- Architectural type: Gothic revival (second church)
- Groundbreaking: April 20, 1835 (first churh)
- Completed: 1836 (first church); 1848 (second church) 1867 (rectory)
- Demolished: c. 1960 (for church)

Administration
- Archdiocese: New York

The Roman Catholic Church of St. Nicholas was a former Roman Catholic church located at 127 East Second Street between Avenue A and First Avenue in the Alphabet City/East Village neighborhood of Manhattan, New York City. The church, known in German as the Deutsche Römisch-Katholische St. Nicolaus Kirche ("St. Nicholas Roman Catholic German Church"), was the national parish for the local German-speaking population.

== First church (1833–1848) ==
=== Founding ===
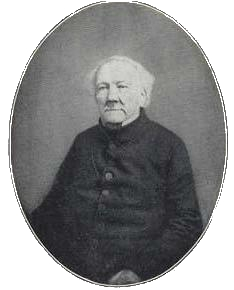
The church was founded in 1833 by the Austrian Rev. Johann Stephen Raffeiner

The parish was founded in 1833 by an Austrian priest, Johann Stephen Raffeiner (1785–1861) as the first German-language Catholic congregation in New York City.

Raffeiner was actively engaged in establishing the parish. Back then a large German-speaking colony was located east of the Bowery, necessitating the establishment of religious services in German. Raffeiner first temporarily rented a carpenter shop on Delancey Street for services. He later leased a former meeting house of the Anabaptists located at Delancey and Pitt Streets, making a formal beginning for the first congregation of German-speaking Catholics.

=== Permanent structure ===
As the number of parishioners increased, the issue of finding a permanent structure for the church became more pressing. For this purpose, four lots of ground, with a frontage of one hundred feet and a depth of one hundred and six, on Second street, between Avenue A and First Avenue, were purchased through Dr. Joseph C. Springer, from John Jacob Astor, on September 1, 1834. The cornerstone of this new church, which was dedicated to Saint Nicholas of Myra, was laid, on Easter Monday, April 20, 1835, by John Power, the Vicar General of the Diocese of New York, with the English sermon being given to the large concourse assembled by Joseph A. Schneller, the Rector of the Episcopalian Christ Church, on Ann Street, and the discourse in German by Raffeiner.

The building was fifty-two by seventy feet and its cost for work and materials $8,174; for fittings $1,384 and for the organ $600. Before it was entirely finished the lease of the hired Baptist meeting house in Delancey Street expired, and the new congregation were for a time accommodated by Father Quarter in the basement of St. Mary's, Grand Street. The dedication ceremony took place on Easter Sunday, 1836. The parish was later incorporated under the old New York law with a board of lay trustees elected by the pew-holders. For seven years Raffeiner officiated as pastor of St. Nicholas', having as his assistant a Benedictine monk, Nicholas Balleis.

=== Later administration ===
When the future saint, John Nepomucene Neumann, arrived in New York from Bohemia as a seminarian, he became friends with Raffeiner, who helped him get settled in his new country. There he celebrated his first Mass in the church on June 26, 1836, making the Church of St. Nicholas his first spiritual home. (Neumann later became the first American male to be canonized in 1977.)

Raffeiner was succeeded in 1840 by his assistant, Balleis. He in turn was succeeded in 1841 by a Franciscan friar, John Lewitz. Shortly after, John Hughes, the Bishop of New York, invited the Redemptorists into the city, and entrusted to them the church property of St. Nicholas. The trustee system still was in effect, however and the word of the founder of the parish to his flock had been, "Never give up your property!" True to these words, the parish trustees retained control of its property, and from there came resulting tensions. The new rector, Gabriel Rumpler, C.Ss.R., appointed by Bishop John Hughes, remained in the parish until 1844. After battling church members and trustees he left to form the Most Holy Redeemer Church on East 3rd Street, which soon became the city's leading German Catholic church.

A Capuchin friar, Ambrose Buchmeyer, then took charge, and remained until his death on October 11, 1861. The reminiscences of Bonaventure Frey recount how he and his companion, Francis Haas, who had both come from Switzerland in 1855 to establish the Capuchin Order formally in the country, were welcomed by Buchmeyer and his assistant, Felician Krebesz, O.M.Cap., and were invited to preach and say Mass in the church before continuing their journey westward.

== Second church (1848–1960) ==
=== New administration ===
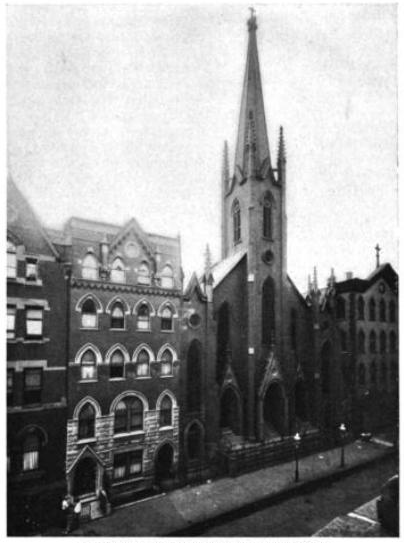
Photograph of St. Nicholas and its rectory, on Second Street (before 1914)

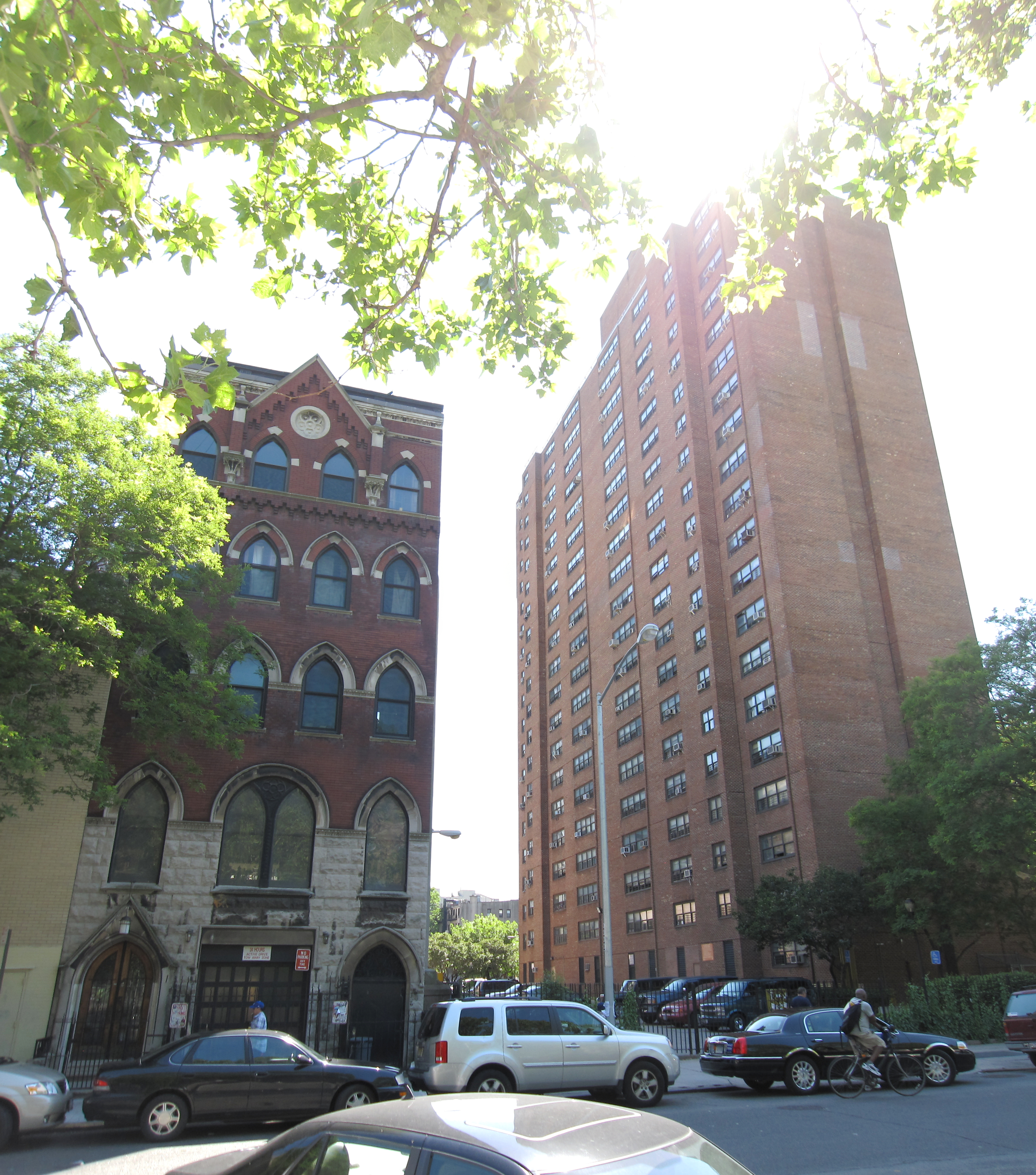
Second Street with the plot where the church used to stand, with the former rectory on the left remaining (2010)

The ever-growing number of German-speaking immigrants necessitated a larger church. The second Church of St. Nicholas was built in 1848 in the Gothic Revival style and on December 24th dedicated by Hughes. The schoolhouse was built in 1867. On Father Buchmeyer's death he was succeeded by Father Krebesz, also a Capuchin, and upon the death of the latter in 1876, Father Francis J. Shadier became pastor, assisted by Revs. Anthony Lamell and John B. Mayer. In 1879 Father Nicholas Sorg became pastor, and was succeeded by Father Mayer, P.R., in 1888. John A. Nageleisen took charge in 1908.

During the administration of Father Sorg a number of church societies and confraternities were established, while under Father Mayer the grand sanctuary was built, together with a large house on 1st Street, the rectory on 2nd Street, and a number of improvements made. The trusteeism that threatened to undermine church discipline in matters spiritual and temporal still obtained under Father Mayer. Upon the death of Father Mayer, Archbishop Farley undertook to place the parish under the regime in vogue in the State of New York regarding church property. He selected the men to be placed in charge of the situation, repeatedly attended meetings of the people, listened to the arguments of their speakers, invited the trustees to call on him in the archiepiscopal residence, with the final result that the last vestige of trusteeism vanished in the largest diocese in America.

A special feature of The New York Times in 1901 mentioned the church among other Catholic structures on the Lower East Side of Manhattan, describing the group "for the most part...limit[ing] themselves to the functions of a parish church, in districts where social needs are otherwise supplied." Without comment on other facilities attached.

In 1908 began the normal form of church government in the parish, under its first pastor and rector, Father Nageleisen. Circumstances and the financial depression in the country brought the church to the verge of bankruptcy, but Archbishop Farley kept it from inevitable disaster by his aid and advice. Within a year Father Nageleisen canceled some $30,000 of the $230,000 debt. The Diamond Jubilee memorial, an artistic chandelier of metal erected on both sides of the high altar, had the form of a vine, at the root of which appear the words, "Pray for the benefactors of St. Nicholas' parish." The tendrils encircled the names of the benefactors, and were set with electric lights as jewels, each representing $1000 paid by the donor. There were twenty tendrils or diamonds as yet, and the proceeds of the offerings were applied not only to the liquidation of the debt, but also to the missionary ends of church extension.

Father Nageleisen was born at Piqua, Ohio, on August 27, 1861, and ordained in the cathedral at Cincinnati by Archbishop Elder on May 30, 1885. He taught philosophy at the theological seminary at Carthagena, Ohio, for two years, and was then assigned as professor at Saint Joseph's, Rensselaer, Indiana. In 1897 Archbishop Corrigan received him into the Archdiocese of New York, where he officiated as curate at St. Boniface's, 2nd Avenue, until 1898, when he was sent into Rockland County. In 1908 he was appointed irremovable rector of St. Nicholas'.

=== Rectory ===
The former St. Nicholas Roman Catholic Church rectory, located at 135 East Second Street, between Avenue A and First Avenue, was built in 1867. According to the AIA Guide to New York City, the building is "an essay in the late Gothic Revival mannerism, with swell stone trim around the tiers of pointer arch windows. Note the silhouette of the demolished church on the old rectory's wall: palimpsest."

=== Later years ===
In 1914 the number of parishioners was about 600. The church property at that time was valued at $445,000, with $200,000 encumbrance. The basement of the church was used by the Slovenian Catholics, who were attended by a Franciscan from Brooklyn, until 1916 when they built the Slovenian Church of St. Cyril on St. Marks Place. The societies in the parish were: Rosary, Corpus Christi, Agony of Our Lord, Confraternity of the Sacred Heart, four sodalities of the Blessed Virgin Mary, Conference of St. Vincent de Paul Society, St. Nicholas' and St. Aloysius' societies, and the St. Nicholas' School Association. The school had an attendance of 155 boys and 210 girls, and was taught by six Sisters of St. Dominic.

In 1935, The New York Times said the church had "only about fifty parishioners, due to the scarcity of German Catholics in the neighborhood." By mid-century, the continued demographic shift led to the end of church services and closure of the parochial school. The church of St. Nicholas was sold in 1960 and demolished, the plot turned into a parking lot for the adjacent Village View Houses, which opened in 1964.

== Organ ==
The organ dated from about 1881 was by Engelfried & Hadden. It was played by mechanical action with two manuals, 35 stops and 45 ranks. Lynnwood Farnam, noted concert organist of the early 20th century, visited the church on November 27, 1919, and wrote in one of his notebooks that the organ was a fine old piece in very bad condition, located west gallery, had tracker action, and electric blowing.

== See also ==
- St. Brigid's Roman Catholic Church, another church in the East Village that was slated for demolition, but through a generous anonymous donation was spared, renovated, and re-consecrated on January 27, 2013.
