= 1960 Ecuadorian general election =

- 5 June 1960
- Presidential election
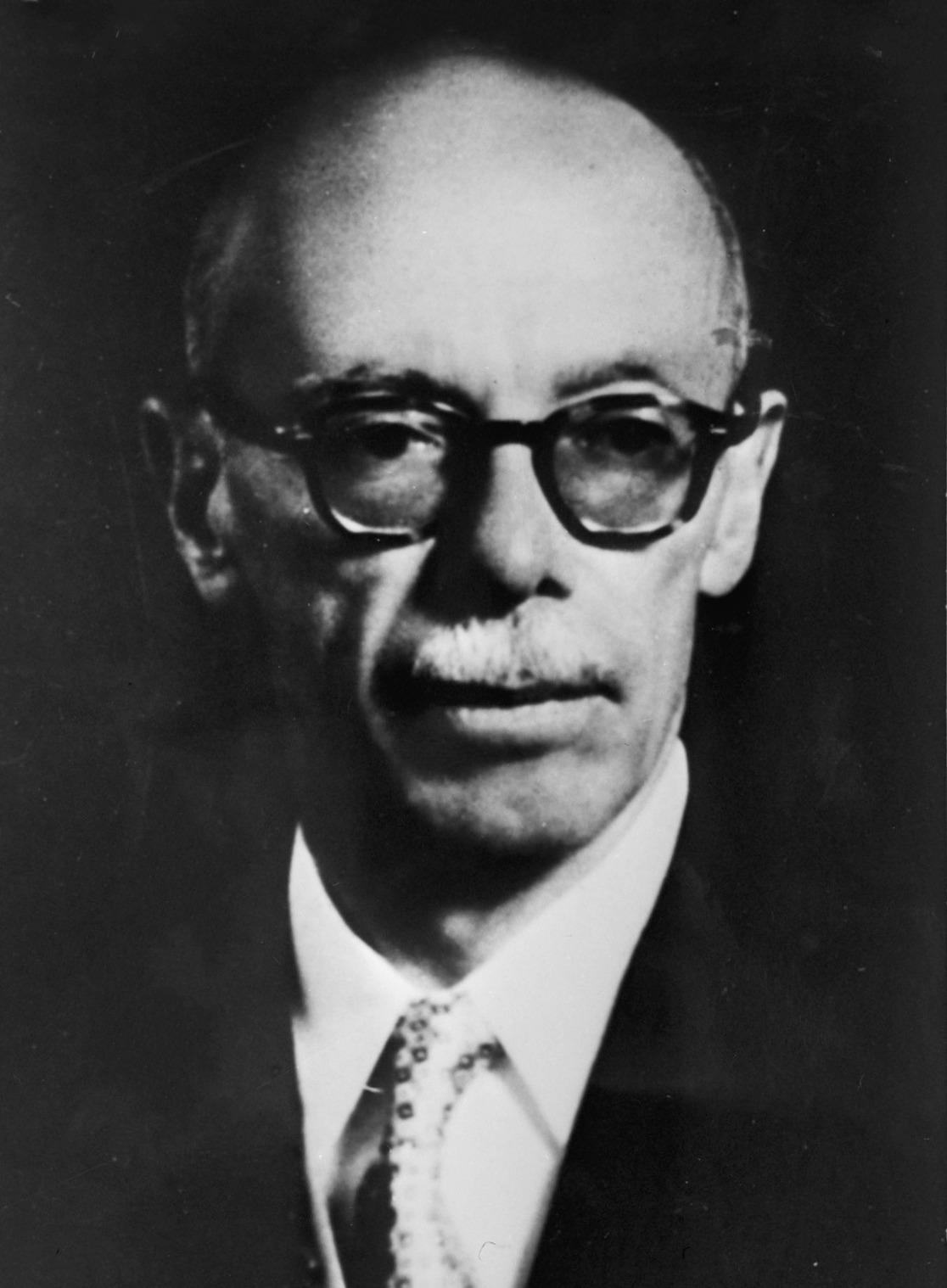

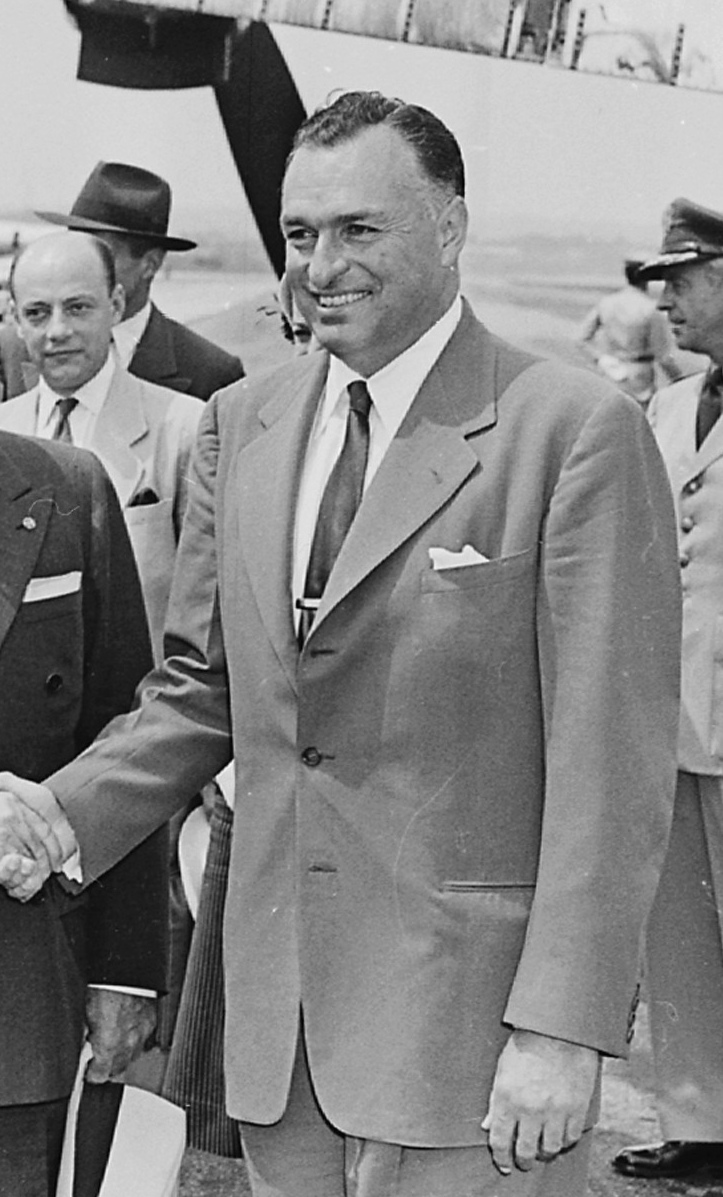

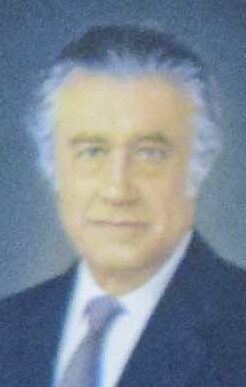
Nominee	José María Velasco Ibarra	Galo Plaza
Party	FNV	PLRE–PSE
Running mate	Carlos Julio Arosemena Monroy	Nicolás Castro Benítez
Popular vote	369,461	179,705
Percentage	48.16%	23.43%
Nominee	Gonzalo Cordero Crespo	Antonio Parra Velasco
Party	ADC	CPE–CPF–PSE
Running mate	Héctor Romero Menéndez	Manuel Benjamín Carrión
Popular vote	172,117	45,822
Percentage	22.44%	5.97%
- Results by province
President before election
Camilo Ponce Enríquez
PSC
Elected President
José María Velasco Ibarra
FNV

General elections were held in Ecuador on 5 June 1960. The presidential election was won by José María Velasco Ibarra of the National Velasquista Federation, who received 48.2% of the vote. His fourth term of office began on 1 September.

== Results ==
=== President ===
Candidate	Running mate	Party	Votes	%
José María Velasco Ibarra	Carlos Julio Arosemena	National Velasquista Federation	369,461	48.16
Galo Plaza	Nicolás Castro Benítez	PLRE–PSE	179,705	23.43
Gonzalo Cordero Crespo	Héctor Romero	Christian Democratic Action (PCE–PSC–ARNE)	172,117	22.44
Antonio Parra Velasco	Benjamín Carrión	CPE–CPF–PSE dissisents	45,822	5.97
Total			767,105	100.00
Registered voters/turnout			1,009,280	–
Source: Nohlen
