= Galo Plaza =

Ecuadorian statesman and politician

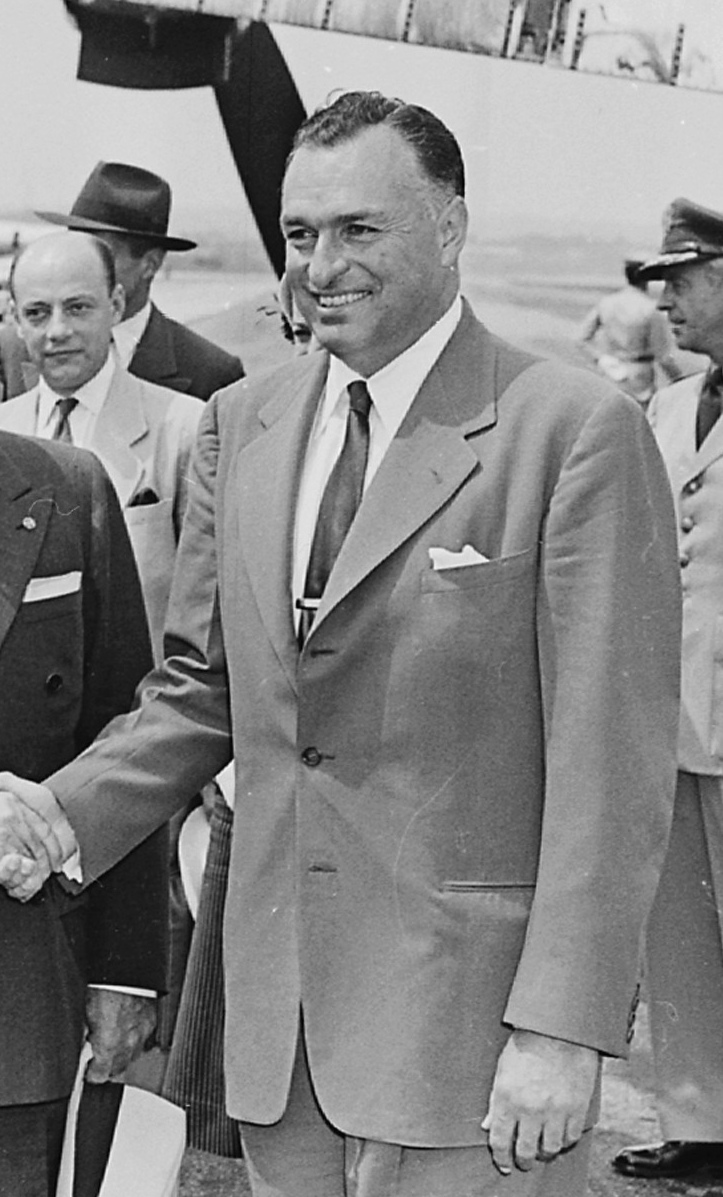
- Galo Plaza in 1951

4th Secretary General of the Organization of American States
- In office 1968–1975
- Preceded by: José Antonio Mora
- Succeeded by: Alejandro Orfila

29th President of Ecuador
- In office 1 September 1948 – 31 August 1952
- Vice President: Manuel Sotomayor; Abel Gilbert
- Preceded by: Carlos Julio Arosemena
- Succeeded by: José María Velasco

Personal details
- Born: Galo Lincoln Plaza Lasso de la Vega; 17 February 1906 New York City, New York, U.S.
- Died: 28 January 1987 (aged 80) Quito, Ecuador
- Party: National Democratic Civic Movement (1947–1987)
- Other political affiliations: Radical Liberal Party (1930–1947)
- Spouse: Rosario Pallares (m. 1933)
- Children: 6
- Education: University of Maryland; University of California, Berkeley; Edmund A. Walsh School of Foreign Service at Georgetown University

Galo Lincoln Plaza Lasso de la Vega (17 February 1906 – 28 January 1987) was an Ecuadorian statesman who served as President of Ecuador from 1948 to 1952 and Secretary General of the Organization of American States from 1968 to 1975. He is the son of former Ecuadorian President Leonidas Plaza.

== Early life ==
Plaza was born in New York City in 1906 at the Marlton House during the exile of his father, the general and ex-president Leónidas Plaza; his mother was Avelina Lasso Ascásubi. In Quito, he completed his secondary school at the Instituto Nacional Mejía. Then, he studied agriculture at the University of Maryland, economics at the University of California, Berkeley, and diplomacy at the Edmund A. Walsh School of Foreign Service at Georgetown University.

== Career ==
In 1938, Plaza was appointed the Minister of War of Ecuador. In 1940, he founded the Colegio Americano de Quito. In 1944, he was appointed as Ecuador's Ambassador to the U.S. In 1948, after forming a liberal political group in Ecuador, he was elected President of Ecuador.

=== Presidency ===
Galo Plaza differed from previous Ecuadorian presidents. The son of former President Leónidas Plaza, he had been born in the United States, where he also attended several universities. His ties to the United States grew even closer as a result of serving there as ambassador under President Carlos Alberto Arroyo del Río. These links, as Pike points out, "rendered him vulnerable to charges by Velasco Ibarra and other demagogic opponents of being the lackey of U.S. imperialism."

Galo Plaza brought a developmentalist and technocratic emphasis to Ecuadorian government. He invited a wide variety of foreign experts in economic development and in governmental administration to recommend and catalog reforms in both areas. In large part because of a lack of political will within either the executive or the legislature, however, virtually none of the recommended reforms was enacted. Nevertheless, the economy experienced a marked improvement, with inflation finally slowing down and both government budget and foreign currency accounts balancing for the first time in many years. This achievement was even more remarkable in light of the series of major earthquakes, landslides, and floods suffered by Ecuador in 1949 and 1950.

No doubt Galo Plaza's most important contribution to Ecuadorian political culture was his commitment to the principles and practices of democracy. Galo Plaza endorsed such democratic guarantees as freedom of the press and the freedom of opponents to voice their opinions, to assemble for political purposes without fear of being jailed or worse, and to be elected to the legislature without fear of being defrauded or arbitrarily dismissed. Galo Plaza was able to create a mystique around the idea of his completing his term in office, something no president had accomplished since 1924, and this mystique no doubt helped him achieve his goal.

As Galo Plaza readily admitted, however, his greatest asset, both politically and economically, was the onset of the nation's banana boom, as diseases plaguing plantations in Central America turned Ecuador into an alternative supplier to the huge United States market. Ecuador's banana exports grew from US$2 million to US$20 million between 1948 and 1952. During these years, Ecuador also benefited from sizable price increases—generated by the Korean War—for its commodity exports.

As president he managed to foment the agricultural exports of Ecuador during his government, creating economic stability. During his presidency, an earthquake near Ambato severely damaged the city and surrounding areas and killed approximately 8,000 people. Unable to succeed himself, he left his office in 1952 as the first president in 28 years to complete his term in office. He ran again in the election of 1960, but was defeated by José Maria Velasco Ibarra.

After leaving office, he held a number of diplomatic posts for the United Nations. He was a mediator in the conflicts in Lebanon (1958), the Congo (1960) and Cyprus (1964–1965). In 1968, he became the Secretary General of the OAS, where he gained a reputation for leadership.

Galo Plaza owned a large hacienda and cattle ranch Zuleta near Quito, where he customarily spent weekends throughout his four years as president. During the later 1950s and into the 1960s, the former president instituted educational and landholding reforms for the benefit of the numerous workers there.

=== Inter-American Dialogue ===
In 1982 Galo Plaza together with the U.S. diplomat Sol M. Linowitz formed the Inter-American Dialogue think tank with the goal of bringing together leaders of the Americas to set a new inter-American agenda.

== Death ==
Galo Plaza died of a heart attack 28 January 1987 in a hospital in Quito. He was survived by his wife, Rosario Pallares, and his five daughters and one son. His granddaughter, María José Plaza, became a politician and served in the National Assembly from 2021.

Political offices
Preceded by Carlos Julio Arosemena	President of Ecuador; 1948–1952	Succeeded by José María Velasco
Preceded by José Antonio Mora	Secretary General of the Organization of American States; 1968–1975	Succeeded by Alejandro Orfila
