= Church of the Most Holy Redeemer (Manhattan) =

Catholic parish church in New York City

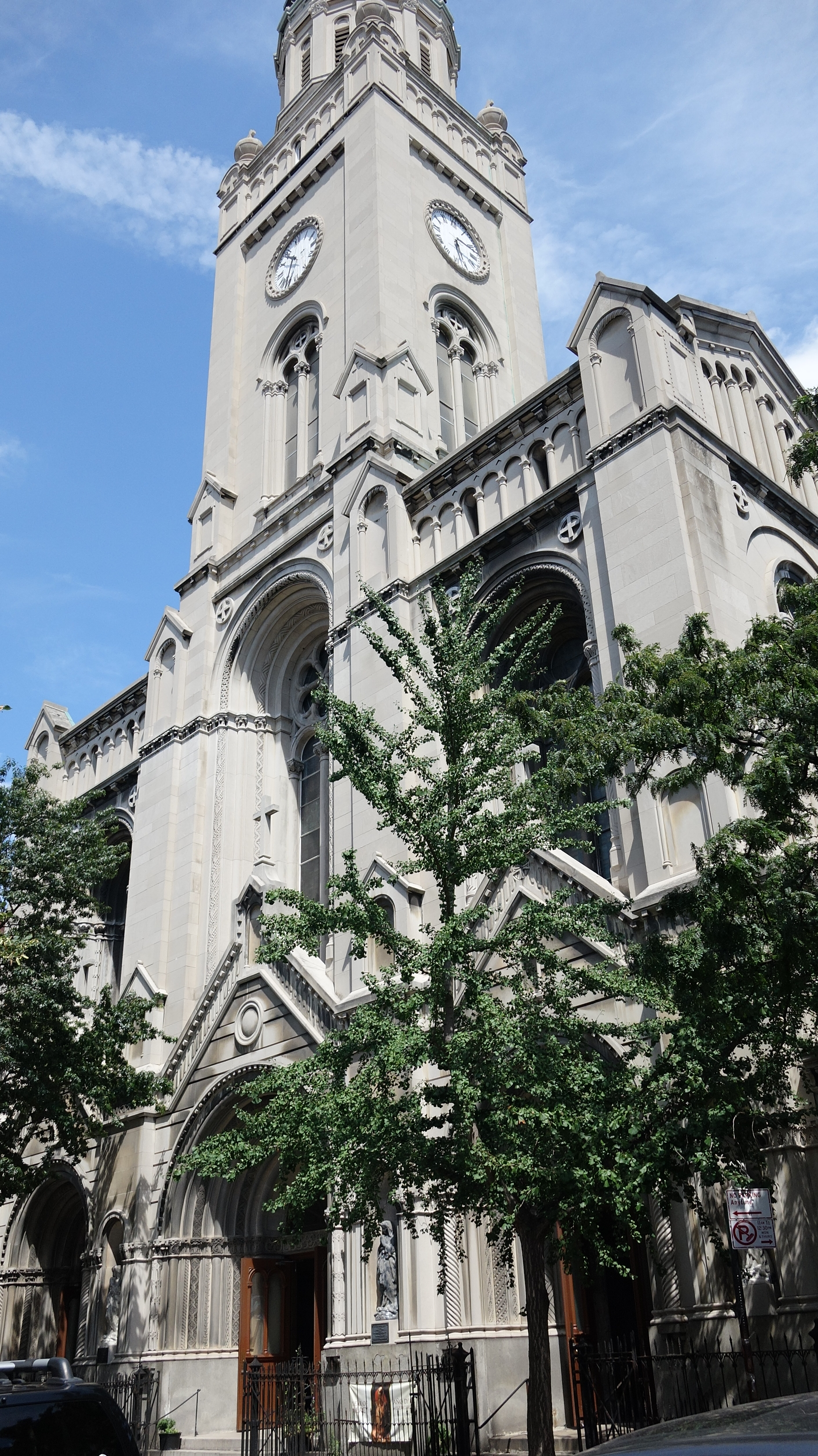
- Church of the Most Holy Redeemer
- 40°43′24″N 73°59′04″W
- Location: 173 East 3rd Street, New York, New York 10009
- Denomination: Catholic Church
- Tradition: Latin Church

History
- Status: Parish church
- Founded: 1844
- Dedication: The Most Holy Redeemer
- Consecrated: 1911

Architecture
- Functional status: Shuttered
- Style: French Gothic Revival
- Groundbreaking: November 8, 1908
- Completed: 1851
- Closed: 2025 (Temporarily for safety)

Administration
- Archdiocese: Archdiocese of New York

The Church of the Most Holy Redeemer, also known as Santísimo Redentor, was a Catholic parish church under the authority of the Archdiocese of New York, located at 161–165 East 3rd Street between Avenues A and B in the East Village neighborhood of Manhattan, New York City. The parish was founded in 1844 by the Redemptorist Fathers, and the church, which looks more like a cathedral than a parish church, was built in 1851–1852, designed by an architect named Walsh. The church was consecrated on November 28, 1852. Bishop McClosky preached the sermon. It closed December 2025.

== History ==
The eclectic architecture is a mix of Baroque and Romanesque styles, an experiment not uncommon in the Victorian era. When originally built, the church had a 250-foot (76.2 m) Baroque tower, but in the 1913 renovation supervised by architect Paul Schulz, the tower was simplified and shortened. The AIA Guide to New York City calls the church "a powerful, deeply modeled, limestone pile, one of the tallest structures (except the "projects") in the community" and dates the church to the 1870s.

The church was once the most important in Manhattan's "Little Germany" and was often referred to as the "German Catholic Cathedral" of New York by the German Catholic community. This parish grew out of the first German Catholic parish in New York City, St. Nicholas' Church, which has since been closed and demolished. The grandiosity of this church is synonymous with the importance of the German Catholic community in the middle of the nineteenth century in New York City. At that time, German Catholics were the second largest Catholic group in the city after the Irish Catholic community. Most Holy Redeemer originally had a primary school run by the School Sisters of Notre Dame which taught its students entirely in the German language for most of the nineteenth century. More than a dozen children died in a fire at the school in 1883.

In 2014, the Church of the Nativity on Second Avenue between Second and 3rd Streets was merged into Holy Redeemer and became known as Most Holy Redeemer/Nativity Parish.

In 2018, the Redemptorist Order withdrew from the parish and the parish is now ministered by priests of the archdiocese.

The church is a pilgrimage shrine dedicated to Our Lady of Perpetual Help. Today, many of the church's parishioners refer to it as Santísimo Redentor.

In June 2025, the Most Holy Redeemer Church announced that it would no longer host events from September onward; at the time, there were major issues with the roof. After the church was shuttered in December 2025, former congregants sought to make the building a landmark. Congregants continued advocating for its reopening throughout 2026.
