= Limbo (boutique) =

Boutique in the United States

The exterior of Limbo as it appeared in a New York Post article in March 1968

Limbo was an American boutique which was opened in 1965 by Martin (Marty) Freedman, originally at 24 St. Mark's Place between Second and Third Avenues in the East Village neighborhood of Manhattan, New York City. The shop moved to 4 St. Mark's Place on the same block in 1967, and closed in 1975 (giving way to another counterculture clothing store, Trash and Vaudeville, which catered to punk fashions for 41 years at the address).

In the May 1968 issue of eye Magazine, Norman Steinberg described Limbo as: "...the East Village clothier of the 'tuned-in' generation." He went on to write: "For the uninitiated, Limbo is much more than just a clothing store. It is a social, intellectual, and entertainment experience that appeals to people of all ages, races, creeds, colors and political persuasions." In his 2016 memoir, American Dreamer: My Life in Fashion & Business, Tommy Hilfiger recalled: "Limbo was the best clothing store in the world. [I] wanted to make People's Place feel just like it, only even cooler." In her article, "The Birthplace of American Vintage – How East Village Shop Limbo Made Secondhand Clothes Cool," for New York Magazine, 50th The Cut, Ada Calhoun reported: "Nearly everyone who made the East Village scene in the late 1960s has a Limbo story."

== History ==
Among its important contributions to the world of fashion, Limbo is recognized as being the first boutique to sell used, prewashed, distressed and embellished jeans.

Owner Marty Freedman sold used Levi's jeans to a local hippy clientele. When supplies of used Levi's ran low he took new, unwashed Lee jeans, a brand he also carried, and sent them out to a laundry. It marked the first time a retailer had washed a new pair of jeans to get a used, worn effect, and the idea became a hit. Moreover, Freedman used East Village artists to embellish the jeans with patches, decals and other touches, and sold them for $200. Freedman sold the store in 1975 to Trash & Vaudeville.

Limbo's eclectic merchandise – from vintage suits, dresses and military uniforms, to original designed outfits made of Indian cottons and silks – helped introduce the free-wheeling sartorial expression associated with the 1960s—a style that informed and was informed by rock & roll music and radical politics, Eastern spirituality and liberated sexuality.

Limbo helped turn clothing into a medium that critiqued assumptions of both high and low culture, just as pop culture became the dominant culture. The store also helped normalize the notion of unisex clothing. It was regularly featured in the fashion and style sections of the New York newspapers, as well as national magazines, including Cosmopolitan, Glamour, Life, Vogue, Jet, and L'uomo Vogue.

In the process, it became the "haberdasher" of New York City's "counter-culture", as well as of musicians playing at the Fillmore East right around the corner on Second Avenue. By arrangement with the theater's legendary owner Bill Graham, the store also acted as an unofficial ticket agent to the Fillmore and sold Fillmore East jerseys styled after those it furnished the ushers and staff. The store dressed rock stars and artists from Janis Joplin, Jimi Hendrix and Jim Morrison, to the New York Dolls and Velvet Underground. John Lennon and Yoko Ono frequented the shop, as did Andy Warhol and his "superstars", including Baby Jane Holzer, Nico, Viva and Edie Sedgwick.

In the Chicago Tribune in 1966, photographer and chronicler of fashion Bill Cunningham reported that "Even top designers of Paris rush down to Limbo as soon as they arrive in New York." Hubert de Givenchy, Halston, Courrèges, and other couturiers frequented the store. Ralph Lauren mined its shelves, particularly for "vintage" and unusual clothing, while Tommy Hilfiger, initially a customer, later drove down from Elmira, New York to load his trunk and backseat of his car with Limbo's pre-washed jeans to resell at his stores upstate.

Limbo was a destination to visit in the East Village, attracting not only fashion-conscious people from other Manhattan neighborhoods and the city's suburbs, but also people from other states and overseas. The store's metal steps and landing were for a time a place to observe the scene and to be seen.

== In popular culture ==
- Limbo's exterior, identified by its noted "pointing hand" sign, can be seen in a segment of Ralph Bakshi's 1972 animated film, Fritz the Cat.

== Awards and honors ==
In September 1972, the Art Directors Club awarded Limbo a special "Certificate of Merit" for its contribution to Advertising, Editorial and Television Art and Design.
