= 8th Street and St. Mark's Place =

West-east street in Manhattan, New York

8th Street/St. Mark's Place
- St. Mark's Place
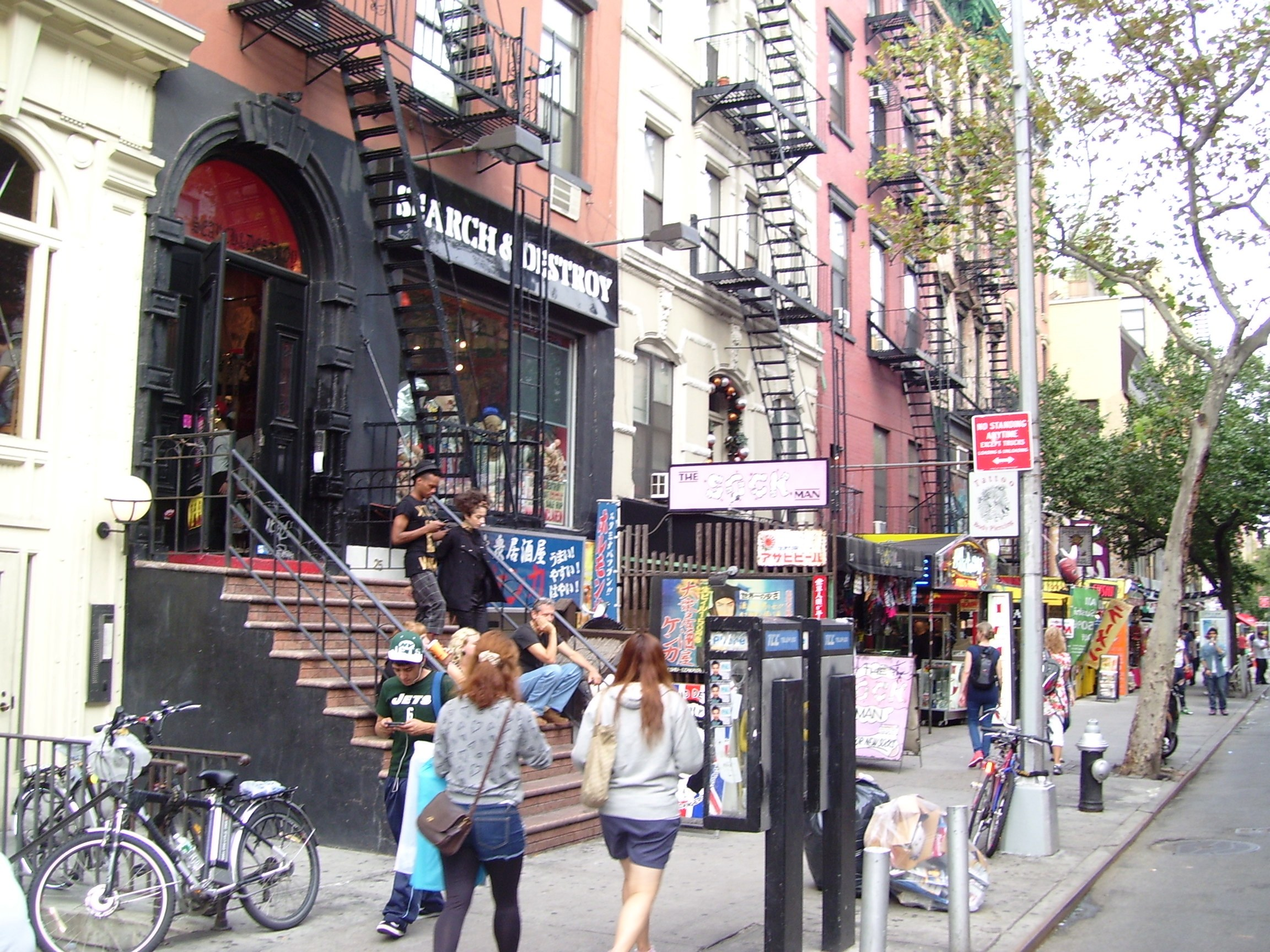
- St. Mark's Place in 2010
- Interactive map of 8th Street/St. Mark's Place
- Maintained by: New York City Department of Transportation
- Length: 1.3 mi (2.1 km)
- Location: Manhattan, New York City
- ZIP Codes: 10003, 10009, 10011
- West end: Sixth/Greenwich Avenues in West/Greenwich Villages
- East end: Avenue D in East Village
- North: 9th Street
- South: Waverly Place (6th Avenue to Broadway); 7th Street (Bowery to Avenue D)

Construction
- Commissioned: March 1811

8th Street is a street in the New York City borough of Manhattan that runs from Sixth Avenue to Third Avenue and also from Avenue B to Avenue D; its addresses switch from West to East as it crosses Fifth Avenue. Between Third Avenue and Avenue A it is named St. Mark's Place, after the nearby St. Mark's Church in-the-Bowery on 10th Street at Second Avenue.

St. Mark's Place is considered a main cultural street for the East Village. Vehicular traffic runs east along both one-way streets. St. Mark's Place features a wide variety of retailers. Venerable institutions lining St. Mark's Place have included Gem Spa and the St. Mark's Hotel. There are several open-front markets that sell sunglasses, clothing, and jewelry. In her 400-year history of St. Mark's Place (St. Marks Is Dead), Ada Calhoun called the street "like superglue for fragmented identities" and wrote that "the street is not for people who have chosen their lives ... [it] is for the wanderer, the undecided, the lonely, and the promiscuous."

== History ==
=== Early years ===
Wouter van Twiller, colonial governor of New Amsterdam, once owned a tobacco farm near 8th and MacDougal Streets. Such farms were located around the area until the 1830s. Nearby, a Native American trail crossed the island via the rights-of-way of Greenwich Avenue, Astor Place, and Stuyvesant Street.

The Commissioners' Plan of 1811 defined the street grid for much of Manhattan. According to the plan, 8th Street was to run from Greenwich Lane (now Greenwich Avenue) in the west to First Avenue on the east. The area west of Greenwich Lane was already developed as Greenwich Village, while the area east of First Avenue was reserved for a wholesale food market.

The plan was amended many times as the grid took shape and public spaces were added or eliminated. The marketplace proposal was scrapped in 1824, allowing 8th Street to continue eastward to the river. On the west side, Sixth Avenue was extended and Greenwich Lane shortened, shifting the boundary of 8th Street, ever so slightly, to Sixth Avenue and allowing Mercer, Greene, Wooster and MacDougal Streets to continue northward to 8th.

=== 19th century ===
After the Commissioners' Plan was laid out, property along the street's right of way quickly developed. By 1835, the New York University opened its first building, the Silver Center, along Eighth Street near the Washington Square Park. Row houses were also built on Eighth Street. The street ran between the Jefferson Market, built in 1832 at the west end, and the Tompkins Market, built in 1836, at the east end. These were factors in the street's commercialization in later years.

Eighth Street was supposed to extend to a market place at Avenue C, but that idea never came to fruition. Capitalizing on the high-class status of Bond, Bleecker, Great Jones, and Lafayette Streets in NoHo, developer Thomas E. Davis developed the east end of the street and renamed it "St. Mark's Place" in 1835. Davis built up St. Mark's Place between Third and Second Avenues between 1831 and 1832. Although the original plan was for Federal homes, only three such houses remained in 2014.

Meanwhile, Eighth Street became home to a literary scene. At Astor Place and Eighth Street, the Astor Opera House was built by wealthy men and opened in 1847. Publisher Evert Augustus Duyckinck founded a private library at his 50 East Eighth Street home. Anne Lynch started a famous literary salon at 116 Waverly Place and relocated to 37 West Eighth Street in 1848. Around this time and up until the 1890s, Eighth Street was co-named Clinton Place in memory of politician DeWitt Clinton, whose widow lived along nearby University Place.

In the 1850s, Eighth Street housed an educational scene as well. The Cooper Union for the Advancement of Science and Art, a then-free institution for art, architecture and engineering education, was opened in 1858. The Century Club, an arts and letters association, relocated to 46 East Eighth Street around that time; the Bible House of the American Bible Society, was nearby. In addition, the Brevoort Hotel, as well as a marble mansion built by John Taylor Johnston, were erected at Fifth Avenue and Eighth Street.

At the same time, German immigrants moved into the area around Tompkins Square Park. The area around St. Mark's Place was nicknamed Kleindeutschland, or "Little Germany", because of a huge influx of German immigrants in the 1840s and 1850s. Many of the homes turned into boarding houses, as the area had 50,000 residents but not a lot of real estate. Tenement housing was also built on St. Mark's Place.

By the 1870s, apartments replaced stables and houses along the stretch of Eighth Street west of MacDougal Street. The elevated Third and Sixth Avenue Lines were also built during that time, with stops along the former at Ninth Street and along the latter at Eighth Street.

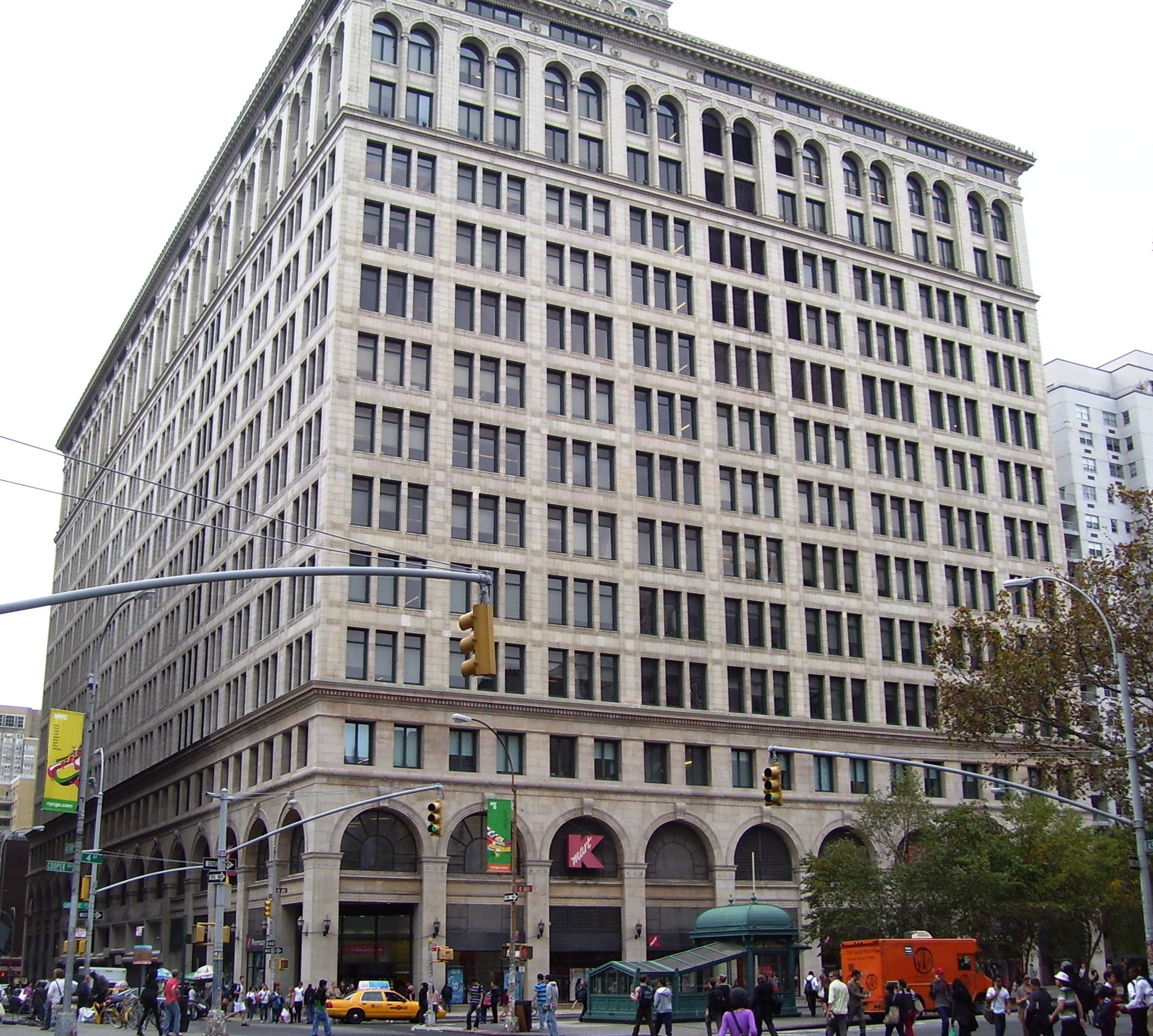
Wanamaker Annex

At the southwest corner of Broadway and Eighth Street, the street's first commercial building was built. By the 1890s, buildings on the stretch from Bowery to Fifth Avenue were used for trade. In 1904, the Wanamaker's Department Store opened at the former A.T. Stewart store along Broadway between 9th and 10th Streets, with an annex built at Eighth Street.

=== 20th century ===
In the early 1900s, Little Germany was shrinking. At the same time, Jews, Hungarians, Poles, Ukrainians, and Russians from Eastern Europe started moving in. In 1916, members of the Slovenian community and Franciscans established the Slovenian Church of St. Cyril, which still operates. At this point, St. Mark's Place was considered a part of the Lower East Side.

On the western stretch of Eighth Street, an art scene was growing. Gertrude Vanderbilt Whitney, Daniel Chester French, and other artists moved in the stables at MacDougal Alley at this time. By 1916, a studio complex for artists replaced most of these stables, making the areas around Eighth Street popular for bohemians. Whitney, a patron for other American painters, combined four houses on West Eighth Street houses into the Whitney Museum in 1931.

The 1927 construction of the skyscraper at One Fifth Avenue, as well as the Eighth Street Playhouse movie theater, helped influence development on the Sixth Avenue end of the street, where construction of the IND Eighth Avenue Line had required destruction of many buildings there. On an adjoining block, the Women's House of Detention was built in Jefferson Market complex in 1929–1932 and existed through the 1970s.

In the 1930s, after Prohibition ended, West Eighth Street became an entertainment area. Around that time, the New York School movement for abstract expressionist painters was centered around Eighth Street, with many such painters moving to Eighth Street.

After World War II, property along 8th Street was converted to apartment houses. The Rhinelander Estate, one of the major landowners on Eighth Street, erected a building between Washington Square North, Fifth Avenue, West Eighth Street, and the Whitney Museum site. Sailor's Snug Harbor, the other major land owner, demolished the blocks from Fifth Avenue to Broadway on the north side of Eighth and Ninth Streets, including the popular Brevoort Hotel. It replaced these blocks mainly with low-rise apartment buildings and stores, as well as two high-rises. Around this time, West Eighth Street was also becoming the location of neighborhood commerce.

After the elevated train lines were demolished in the 1940s and 1950s, the real estate industry tried to entice residents to the St. Mark's Place area, describing the neighborhood as "East Village". This area became home to an underground scene, and as it was far from public transportation, it became rundown. A 1965 Newsweek article described the East Village by telling readers to "head east from Greenwich Village, and when it starts to look squalid, around the Bowery and Third Avenue, you know you're there."

In the 1960s, Macdougal and West Eighth Streets, as well as St. Mark's Place, became a popular area for hippies. A women's clothing store, a pharmacy, and bookstores were replaced by fast food restaurants and other shops, directed toward the area's tourism base. By 1968, St, Mark's Place became a stopping point for tour buses, which formerly skipped the area.

In 1977, St. Marks Place became the epicenter of punk rock, when Manic Panic opened its doors on July 7, 1977 (7/7/77). The shop quickly attracted musicians from Cyndi Lauper to the Ramones.

In 1980, hot dog company Nathan's Famous moved into the location of a former bookstore on Eighth Street, to the anger of some Greenwich Village residents. However, other establishments, such as the B. Dalton bookstore, clothing stores, and shoe stores, started to attract tourists to the area. By the 1990s, the areas around both Eighth Street and St. Mark's Place were becoming rapidly gentrified, with new buildings and establishments being developed along both streets. The Village Alliance Business Improvement District was formed in 1993 to care for the area around Eighth Street.

A section of West 8th Street was co-named Jimi Hendrix Way in June 2026.

== Notable buildings and sites ==
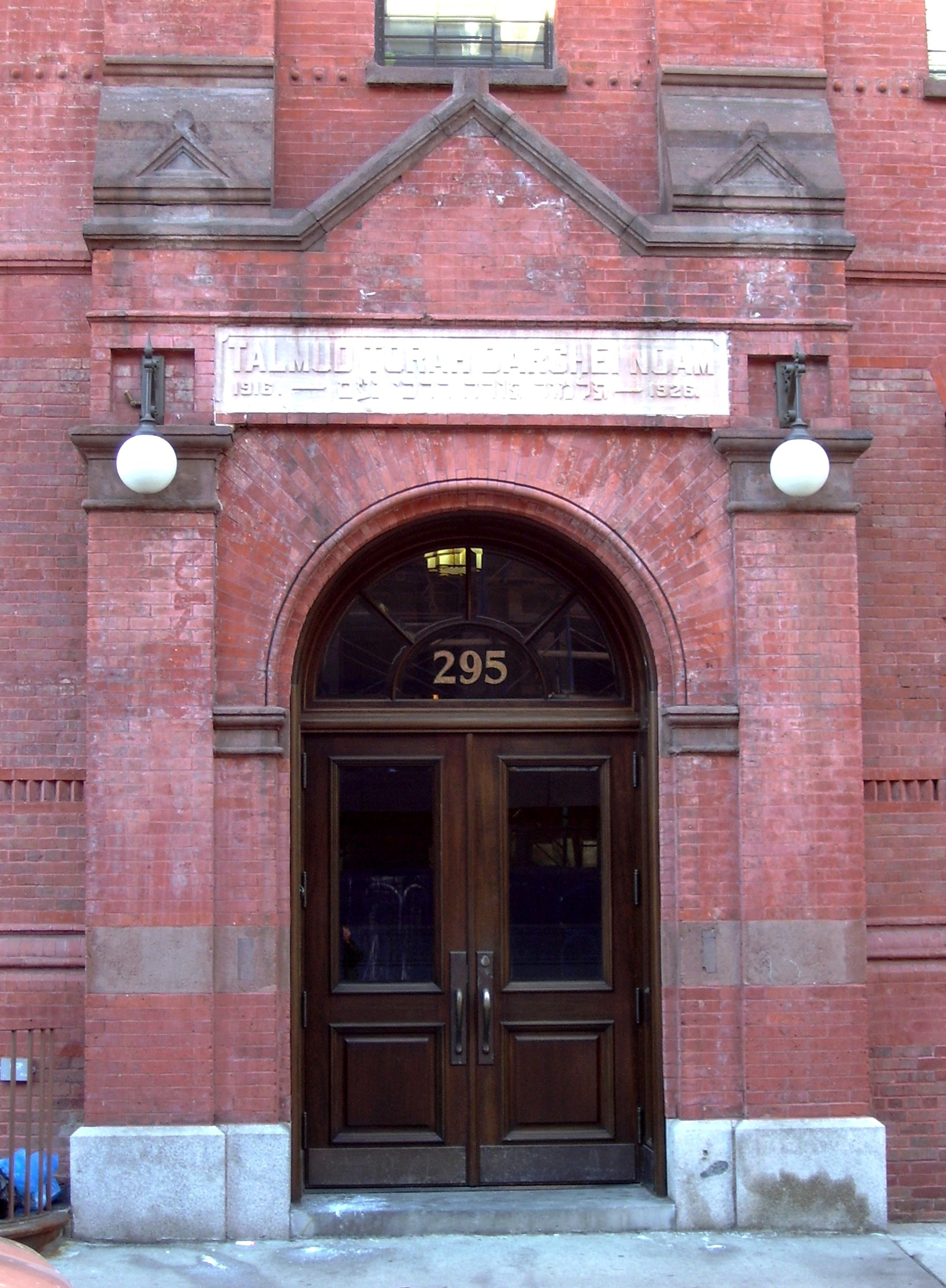
The entrance to 295 East 8th Street, with "Talmud Torah Darchei Noam" above the door

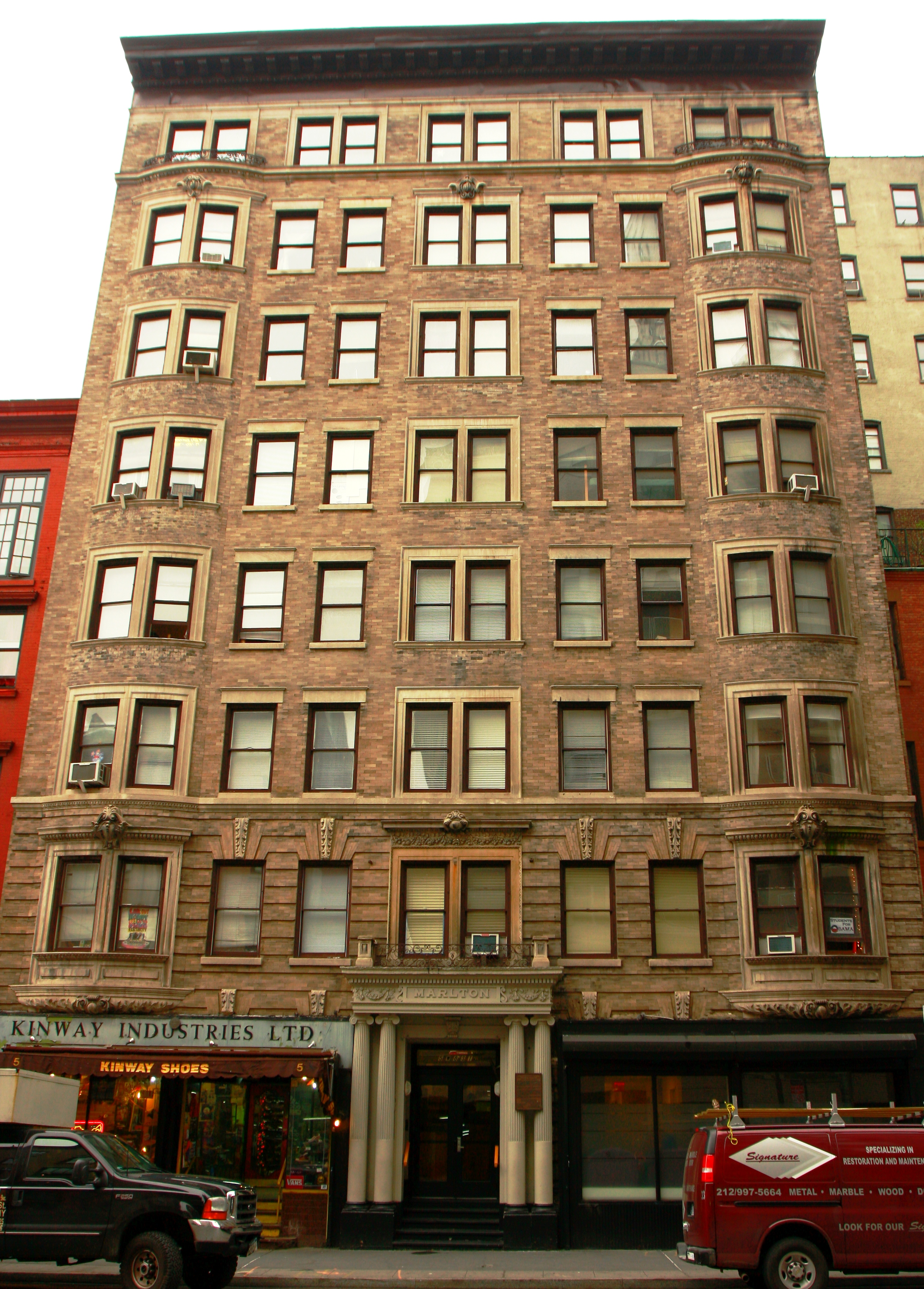
Marlton House in 2008

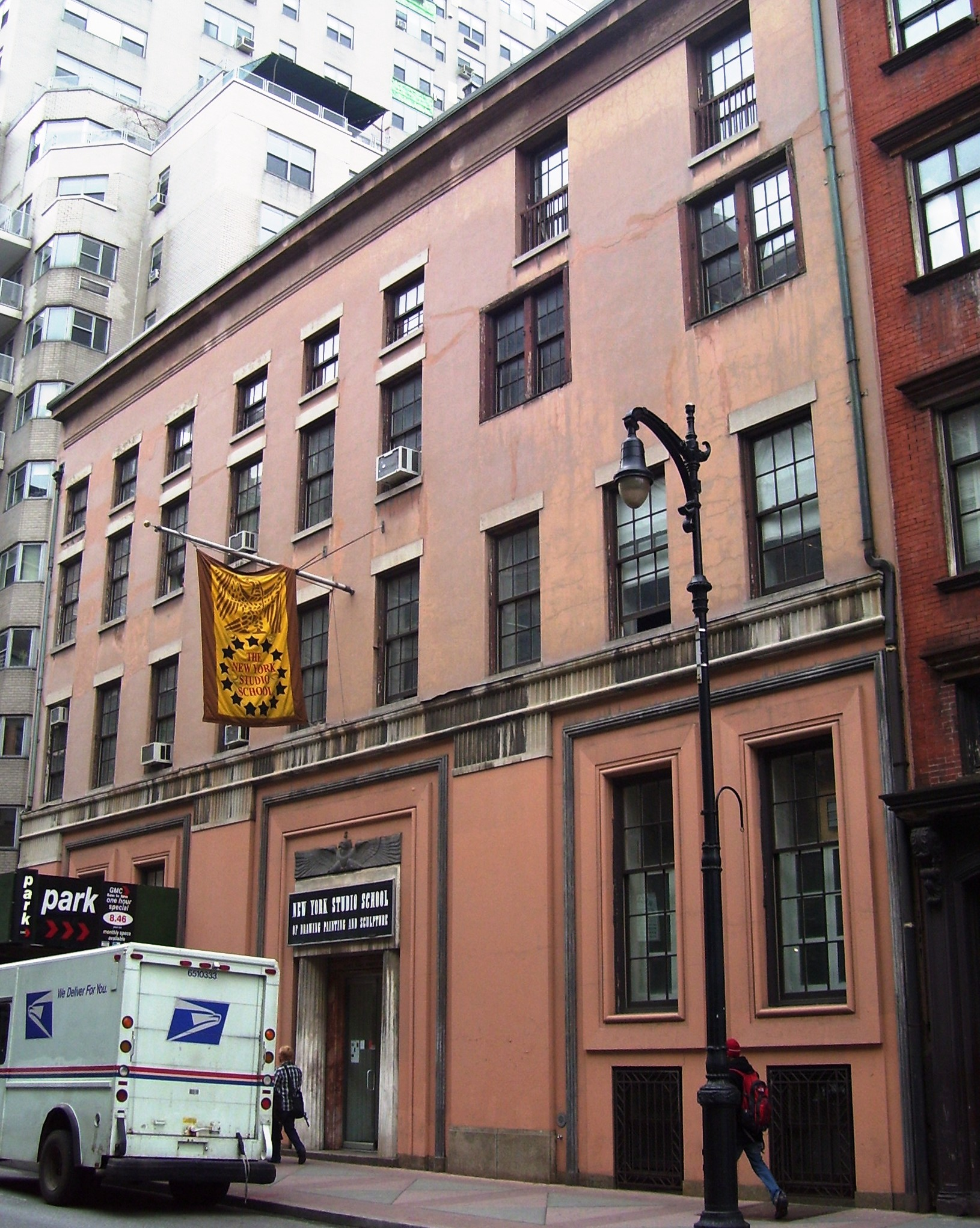
The original location of the Whitney Museum, three converted townhouses at 8–12 West 8th Street

=== 8th Street ===
East

- 127 Avenue B, also known as 295 East 8th Street, on Tompkins Square Park, was originally the Tompkins Square Lodging House for Boys and Industrial School. It was designed by Vaux & Radford and built in 1887. The building later became the Children's Aid Society Newsboy and Bootblacks Lodging House, and was briefly a synagogue, Talmud Torah Darchei Noam. The building was restored in 2006, and is now apartments. The building was featured prominently in the 2002 film, In America.
- The stucco-faced apartment building at 4–26 East 8th Street between Fifth Avenue and University Place was built in 1834–36 and remodeled in 1916. It was designed by Harvey Wiley Corbett, and has been described as a "stage set, symbolic of the 'village' of a bohemian artist."
- The residential apartment building at One Fifth Avenue, on the southeast corner of East 8th Street, was built in 1929 and was designed by Helme, Corbett & Harrison and Sugarman & Berger. The brown brick building features numerous step-backs, battlements, buttresses and other suggestions of medieval architecture.
- The full-block building on 8th Street bordered by Lafayette Street, 9th Street and Broadway, which carries the addresses 499 Lafayette Avenue and 770 Broadway, was built in 1902 to be the Annex for the giant John Wanamaker's Department Store located one block north between 9th and 10th Streets. The two buildings were connected by a skybridge over 9th Street which was dubbed the "Bridge of Progress". The main store was destroyed by fire in 1955, but the Annex building remains, and features retail space as well as offices.
- Across the street, also between Lafayette Street and Broadway, 8th Street runs behind Clinton Hall at 13 Astor Place, also known as 21 Astor Place. This was once the site of the Astor Opera House outside of which the Astor Place Riot occurred. The Opera House opened in 1847 and closed in 1890 to be replaced by the current building, designed by George E. Harney, which became the site of the New York Mercantile Library. The library left the 11-story building in 1932, and it has since been a union headquarters (District 65 of the Distributive Workers of America), the Astor Place Hotel, and, as of 1995, condominiums.

West

- Marlton House at 3–5 West 8th Street between Fifth and Sixth Avenues in Greenwich Village was built in 1900 as the Marlton Hotel, a single room occupancy (SRO) facility. It was notable for its bohemian clientele, but since 1987 it has been used as a dormitory for The New School.
- The three former 1838 row houses at 8–12 West 8th Street between Fifth Avenue and Macdougal Street in Greenwich Village were converted in 1931 by Auguste L. Noel of Noel & Miller into the first home of the Whitney Museum of American Art, which sculptor and heiress Gertrude Vanderbilt Whitney had established in 1929, after the Metropolitan Museum of Art rejected the donation of her extensive collection of contemporary and avant-garde artworks. In 1914, Whitney had started the Whitney Studio at 8 West 8th Street, just behind her own studio on MacDougal Alley. The museum was located here until 1954, when it moved uptown. The building is currently, along with 14 West 8th Street (built in 1900), the New York Studio School of Drawing, Painting and Sculpture.

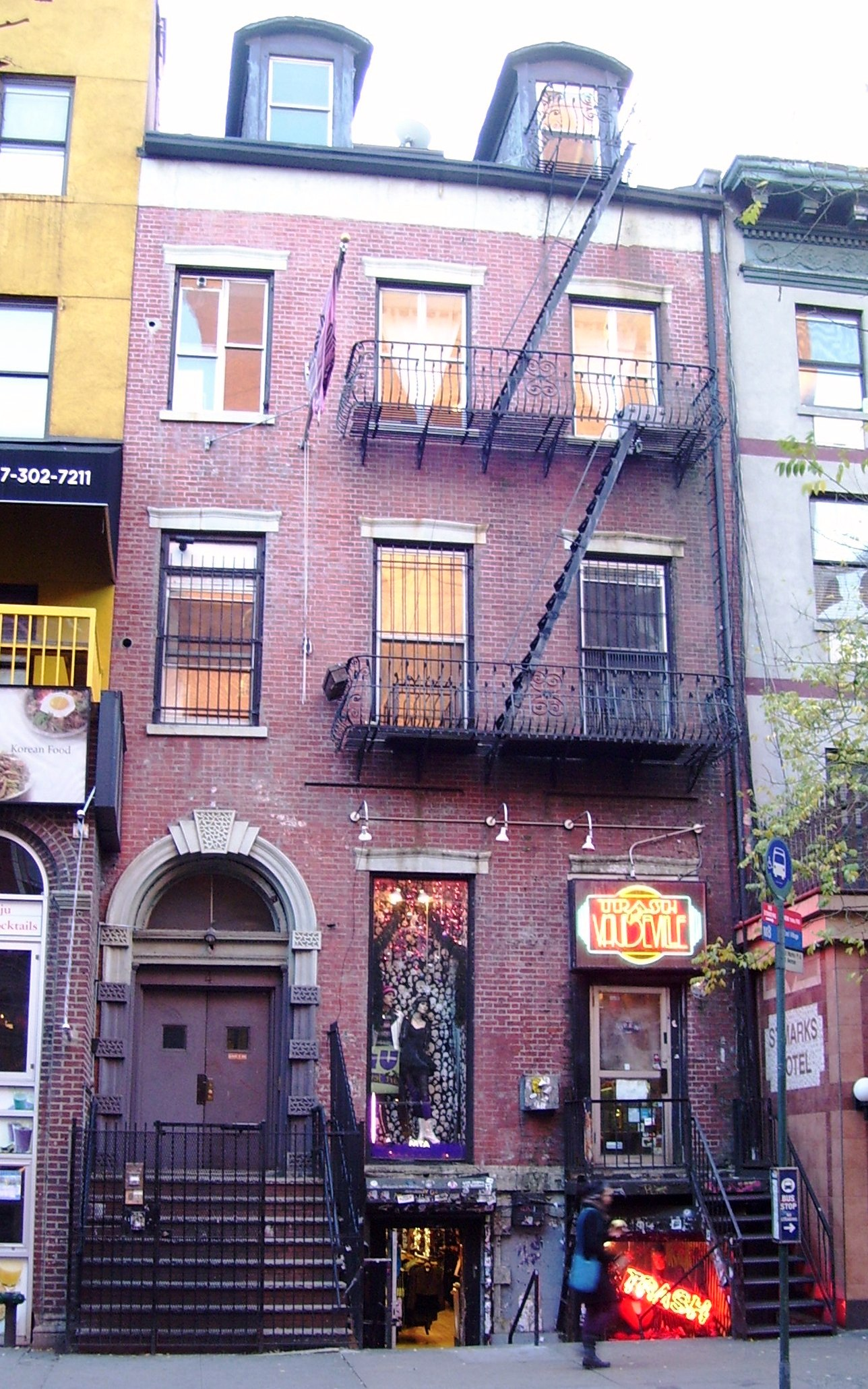
Hamilton-Holly House (#4) was part of the same 1830s development as...

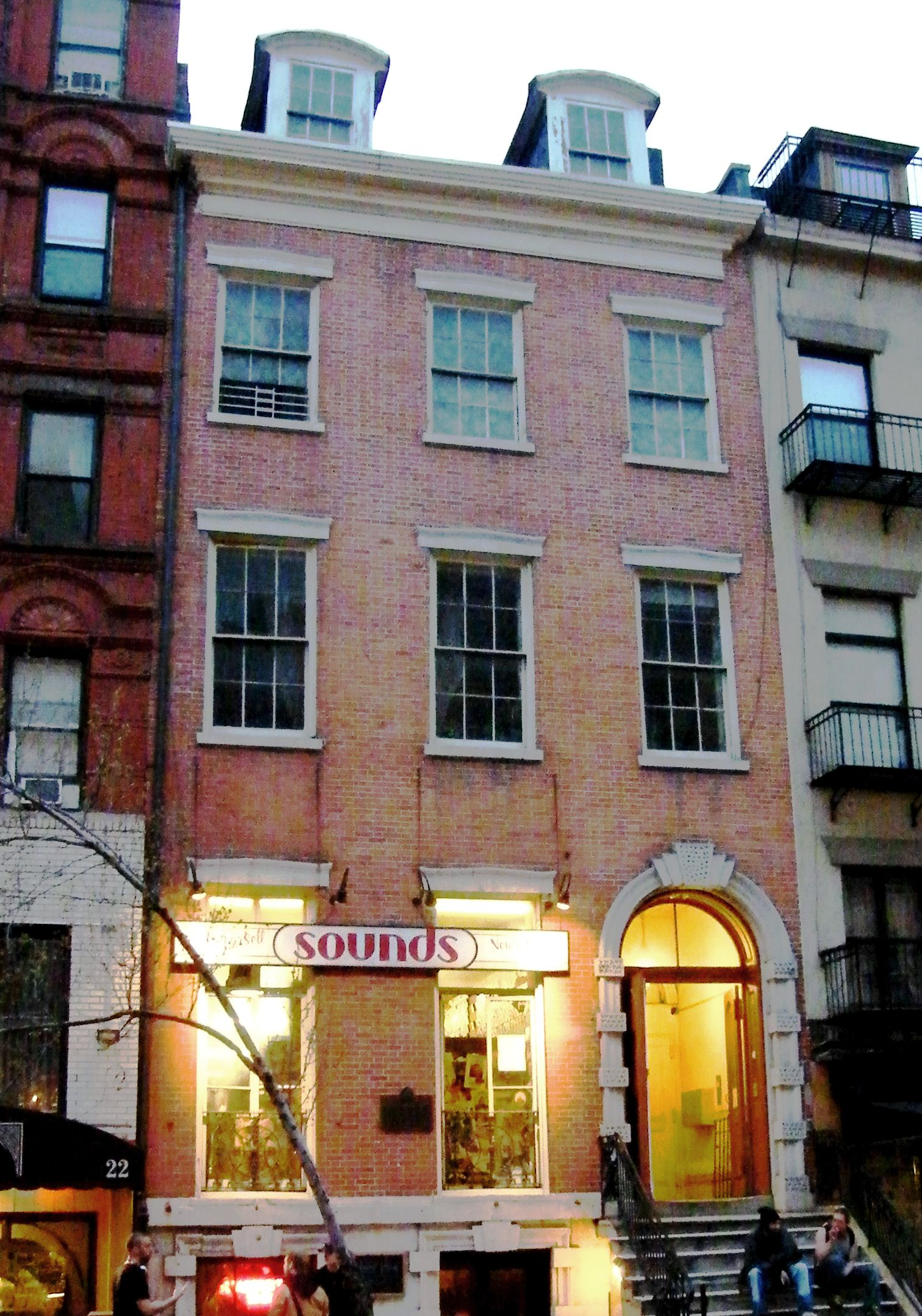
...the Daniel LeRoy House (#20); the developer was Thomas E. Davis.

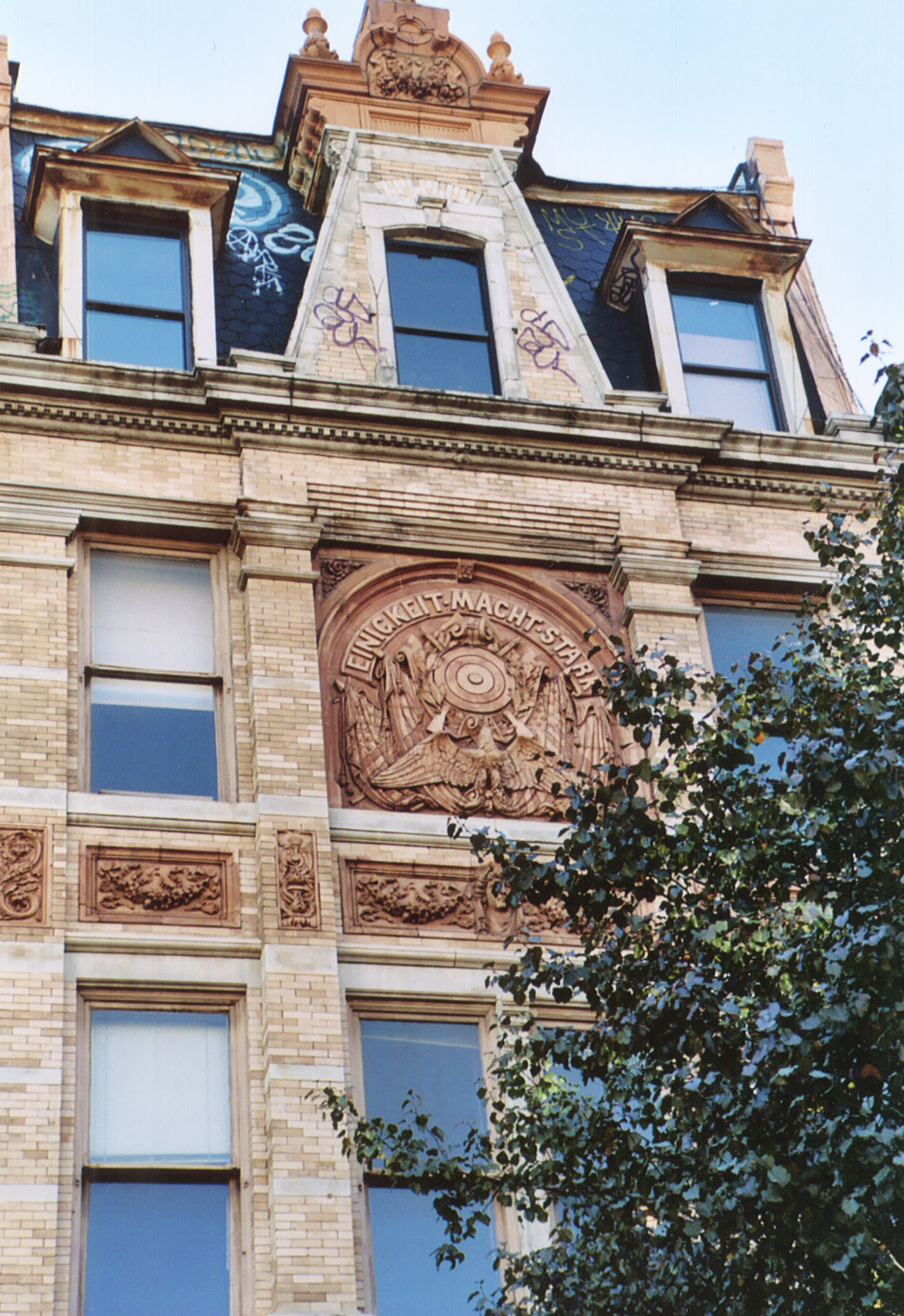
The German-American Shooting Society clubhouse at#12

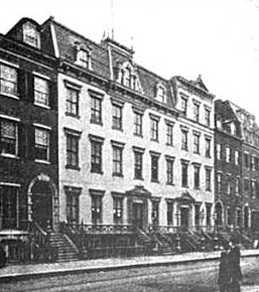
Arlington Hall at #19–23, c.1892

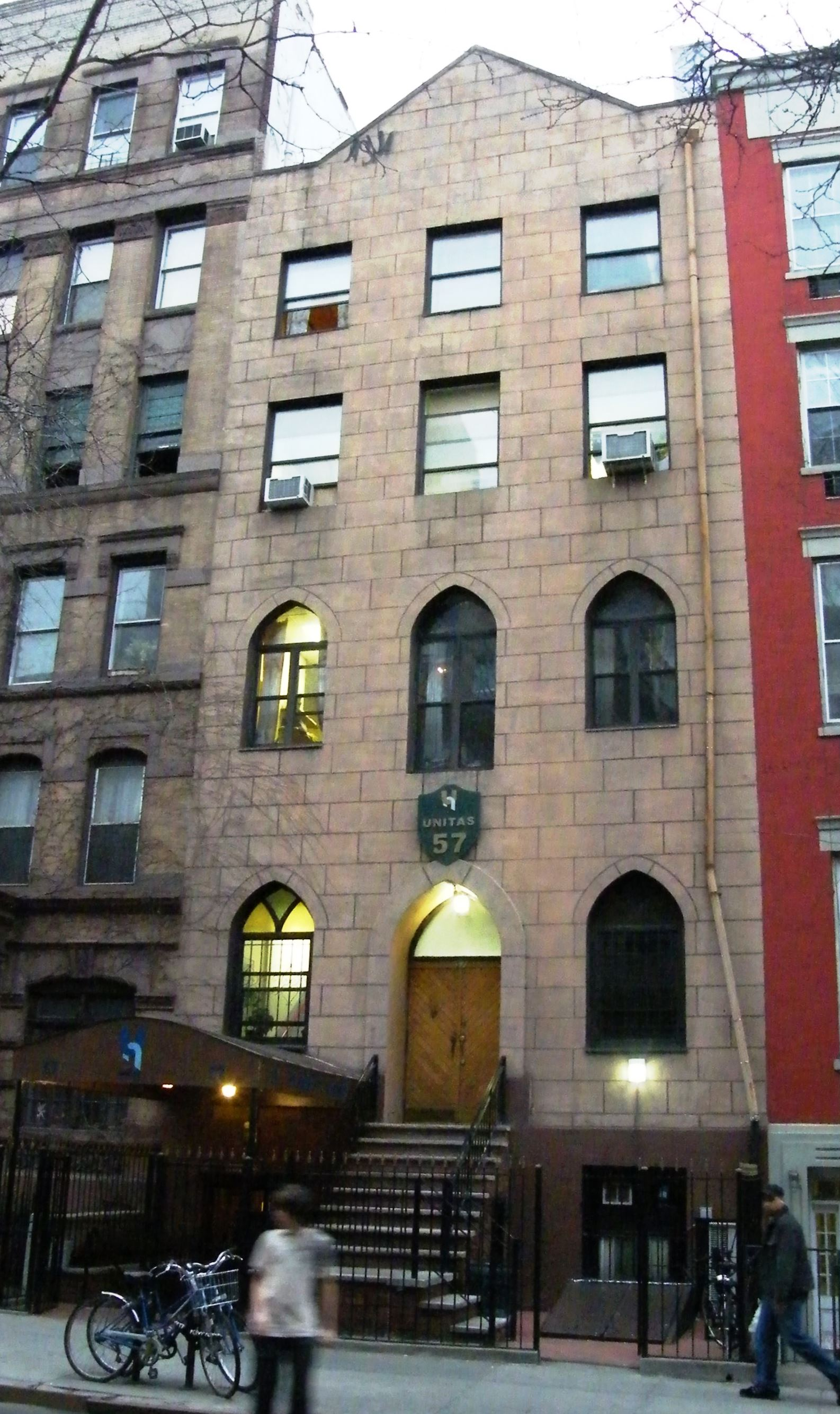
Club 57 at #57

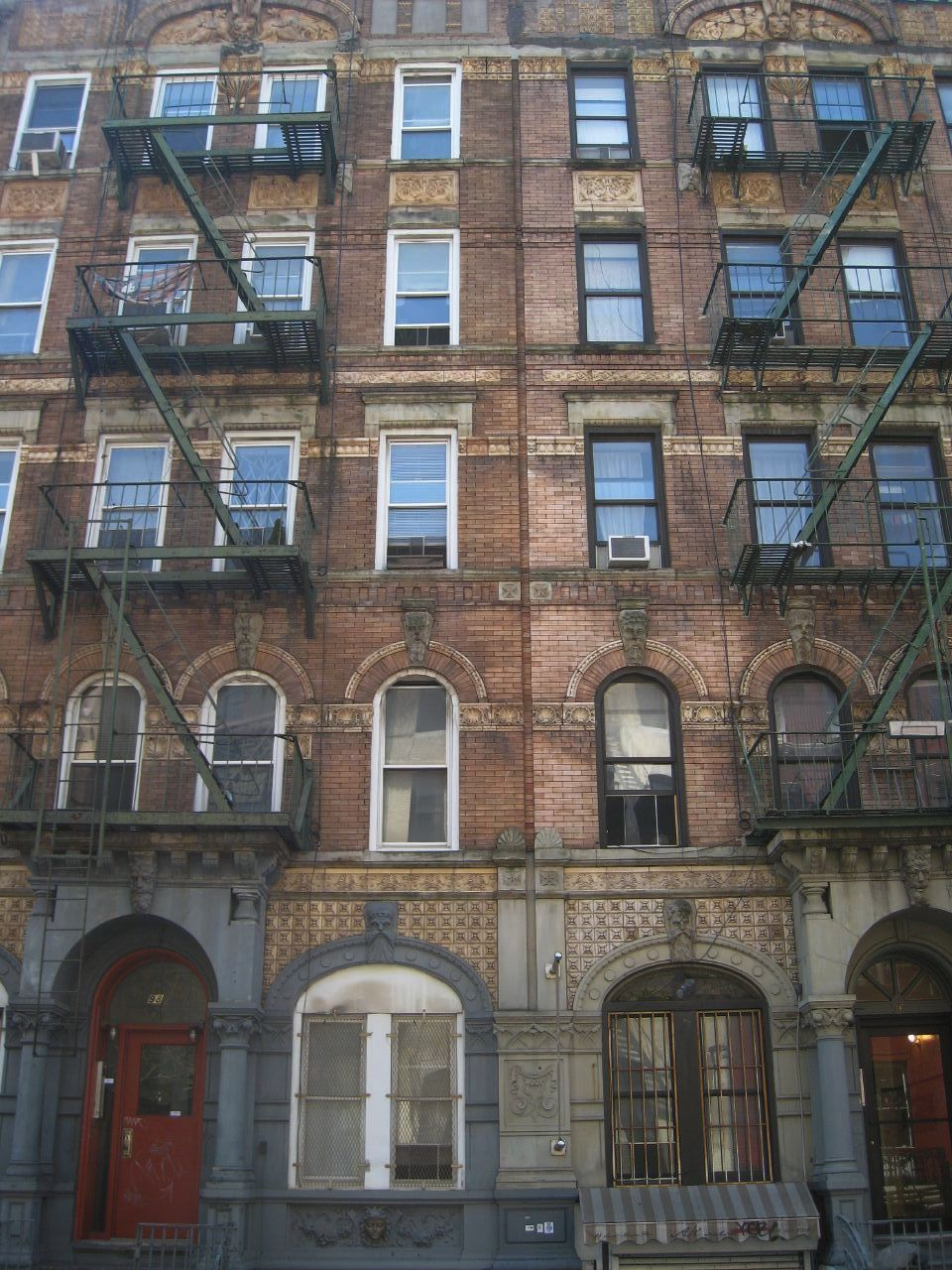
The Physical Graffiti buildings at #96 & #98

=== St. Mark's Place ===
- #2 – Beginning in 1962 it housed The Five-Spot, one of the city's leading jazz clubs. Innovators such as Thelonious Monk, Charlie Parker and Charles Mingus all appeared there. It later became "The Late Show", a vintage clothing store that was popularized by the New York Dolls and owned by their valet, Frenchie. Punk rocker GG Allin also lived in the building at some point.
- #4 – The Hamilton-Holly House was built in 1831 by Thomas E. Davis and sold to Colonel Alexander Hamilton, the son of Alexander Hamilton, first Secretary of the Treasury, in 1833. From 1843 to 1863 it was owned by Isaac C. Van Wyck, the candle and oil merchant. The building was owned from 1863 to 1903 by butter merchant John W. Miller, who added a two-story addition and a meeting hall on the first floor. From 1901 until 1952 the building was owned by the C. Meisel company, a manufacturer of musical instruments. Between 1955 and 1967 it housed the Tempo Playhouse, New Bowery Theatre, and Bridge Theatre, noted for experimental theater, music, dance, and independent film. In 1964 it housed the New Bowery Theatre, a showcase for the American Theatre of Poets. In 1965, the theater drew official attention for screening Flaming Creatures, a controversial film by Jack Smith, which depicted provocative scenes and was seized by the police. The organizer, Jonas Mekas, was arrested, and the film was labeled “obscene” by the court. Jonas Mekas went on to found the Anthology Film Archives, a center dedicated to preserving and showcasing independent, experimental, and avant-garde cinema. In 1979, it found a permanent home in a former courthouse at 32 Second Avenue. From 1967 it housed the Limbo boutique, which in 1975 was sold to Ray Goodman who opened Trash and Vaudeville, a punk clothing store that operated in that location until 2016. The building was designated a New York City landmark in 2004.
- #6 – The Modern School, founded in 1901 in Barcelona by Francesco Ferrer, opened a New York branch here in January 1911. It was led by anarchists Emma Goldman and Alexander Berkman, who founded the Francisco Ferrer Association in 1910, "to perpetuate the work and memory of Francisco Ferrer", who had been executed in October 1909 for plotting to kill Alfonso XIII, the King of Spain, and masterminding the events of Tragic Week, a mass riot in and around Barcelona. Beginning in 1913 the building housed the Saint Mark's Russian and Turkish Baths. In 1979 the building was renovated and renamed the New St. Marks Baths, a gay bath house. The New Saint Marks Baths was closed by the New York City Department of Health in 1985, due to concerns of HIV transmission. The building subsequently housed Mondo Kim's from 1995 until early 2009. Since 2014, the building has been home to one a Barcade location.
- #8 – The New York Cooking School, founded by Juliet Corson in 1876, was the country's first cooking school. It figured prominently in the city's first known Mafia hit in Manhattan, the 1888 killing of Antonio Flaccomio, when it was La Triniria Italian Restaurant. The killer dined there with his victim, then stabbed him a few blocks away.
- #11 – Home to Shulamith Firestone, feminist, activist, author of The Dialectic of Sex: The Case for Feminist Revolution and Airless Spaces, in the seventies and eighties. The storefront at the top of the stairs was the original location of St. Mark's Comics, which opened in May 1983. In 1993, the store moved directly downstairs to the storefront beneath the original location. The downstairs storefront operated through February 2019 when the location closed before relocating to Brooklyn in 2021.
- #12 – Designed by William C. Frohne and built in 1885, as the clubhouse for the Deutsch-Amerikanische Schützen Gesellschaft (German-American Shooting Society). The facade says Einigkeit macht stark (Unity is strength). The building is a remnant of Kleindeutschland (Little Germany), the home of many German immigrants from the mid-19th Century until the General Slocum disaster of June 15, 1904. The building was designated as a landmark in 2001. In the late seventies it housed The New Cinema, featuring film and video by independent filmmakers, including Eric Mitchell, Anders Grafstrom, Scott and Beth B, Jim Jarmusch, Charles Ahearn and Amos Poe.
- #13 – Home to Lenny Bruce in the mid-1960s. Sylvain Sylvain, guitarist for the New York Dolls, lived in the basement apartment in the mid 70s. This was the original location of the St. Mark's Bookshop, before it moved across the street to #12.
- #15 – Former location of "Paul McGregor's Haircutter." McGregor was known for inventing the shag, which he gave to Jane Fonda. Other customers were Warren Beatty, Goldie Hawn and Faye Dunaway. Supposedly, Beatty's film Shampoo was based on McGregor. From 1995 to 1999, the building was home to Coney Island High, a live punk rock music venue co-founded by D Generation singer, Jesse Malin, and notable for being the location of No Doubt's first New York City performance in November 1995.
- #17 – Site of the first Hebrew-Christian Church in America, in 1885.
- #19–25 – As Arlington Hall, this was the site of a 1914 shootout between "Dopey" Benny Fein's Jewish gang and Jack Sirocco's Italian mob, an event that marked the beginning of the predominance of the Italian American gangsters over the Jewish American gangsters. Arlington Hall also had some notable speakers including Police Commissioner Theodore Roosevelt (1895) and William Randolph Hearst (1905). The building later housed the Dom Restaurant, with its well-known Stanley's Bar – where The Fugs played in the mid-1960s – Andy Warhol and Paul Morrissey turned The Dom into a nightclub in 1966, which served as a showcase for the Exploding Plastic Inevitable, Warhol's multimedia stage show for the Velvet Underground. In early 1967, the Dom morphed yet again into The Balloon Farm. Later that year, the lease was transferred to Brandt Freeman International, LTD, and renamed the Electric Circus. The building also served as the second location for the CBGB Fashions retail store from November 2006 through June 2008.
- #20 – The Daniel LeRoy House was built as part of an elegant row of houses in 1832, of which this Greek Revival building is the only survivor. It is a New York City Landmark (1969), and is on the National Register of Historic Places Daniel LeRoy was related to the Stuyvesant family and his wife was a member of the eminent Fish family. From 1980 to 2015, it served as the home of Sounds record store — whose customers included the Ramones, the Beastie Boys, John Belushi, Afrika Bambaataa, Rick Rubin, John Zorn, Joe Jackson, Steve Buscemi, Thurston Moore, Paul Shaffer, Natalie Merchant, and Henry Rollins.
- #24 – This was the original location of the Limbo clothing boutique, which opened for business in 1965 and moved to #4 in 1967.
- #27 – In the 19th and early 20th century, this was Children's Aid Society's Girls' Lodging House.
- #28 – From 1967 to 1971, this storefront housed Underground Uplift Unlimited (UUU), which created and sold some of the most noteworthy protest buttons and posters of era, including "Make Love Not War."
- #30 – Abbie and Anita Hoffman lived in the basement in 1967–68; the Yippies were co-founded with Jerry Rubin there.
- #33 – Home to poet Anne Waldman in the late 1960s/mid-1970s. In 1977, the storefront was occupied by Manic Panic, the first U.S. boutique to sell punk rock attire, which developed its own line of make-up and vibrant hair dyes; notable patrons have included performers David Bowie, Cyndi Lauper, Debbie Harry, and Joey Ramone. One of the building's two storefronts was used to portray Ray's Occult Books for an exterior shot seen in the 1989 film Ghostbusters II.
- #34 – Location of the East Side Bookstore, 1960s–1980s.
- #51 – In the early 1980s, this was home to 51X, a gallery that featured graffiti art, representing artists such as Keith Haring, and Jean-Michel Basquiat.
- #52 – Annex to the Hebrew National Orphan Home, founded in 1912; its main entrance was on 7th Street.
- #57 – Club 57 was an important art and performance space in the late 1970s and early 1980s; notable people, such as Ann Magnuson, Keith Haring, Klaus Nomi, John Sex, Kenny Scharf, David Wojnarowicz, Wendy Wild, The Fleshtones, and Fab Five Freddy, performed or showed there.
- #60 – Building constructed in 1920; later location of the spacious studio apartment of abstract expressionist painter Joan Mitchell, where she lived and painted from 1951 to 1957.
- #62 – The Roman Catholic Slovenian church of St. Cyril, New York is a Franciscan mission serving the Slovenian community of the New York City area. The parish was founded in 1916 with the purchase of this brownstone. For the 80th anniversary of the parish, the narrow church was repaired and the interior redesigned by architect Eduardo Lacroze with sculptures by Bogdan Grom. The parish hosts Slovenian language classes and monthly Slovenian cultural events after Sunday Mass.
- #66 – Location of St. Mark's Hospital of New York City in operation from 1890 to 1931.
- #75 – The Holiday Cocktail Lounge has had a range of visitors including W. H. Auden, Allen Ginsberg and other Beat writers, Shelley Winters, and Frank Sinatra, whose agent lived in the neighborhood.
- #77 – Home to W. H. Auden for almost 20 years. The basement of this building was the location where the newspaper Novy Mir ("New World" or "New Peace"), a Russian-language Communist paper, was founded in 1916. It was edited by Nikolai Ivanovich Bukharin, and Leon Trotsky worked there; the paper stopped publishing after the Russian Revolution of October 1917.

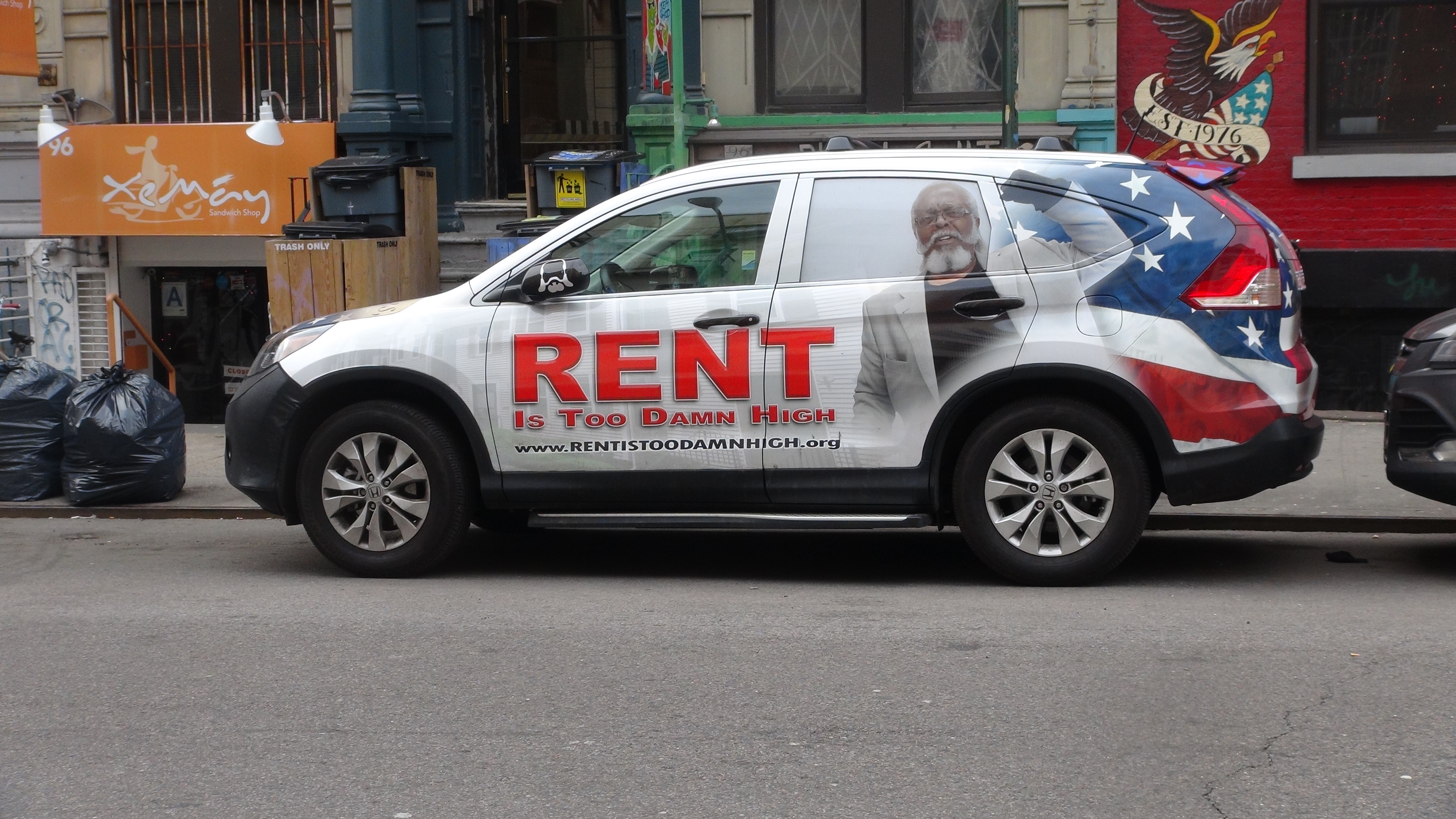
Rent Is Too Damn High Party car parked on St Mark's Place, where founder Jimmy McMillan lived until 2015

- #80 – Home of Leon Trotsky. Theatre 80 saw the premiere of You're a Good Man, Charlie Brown in 1967. Formerly the Jazz Gallery, site of the last performance by Lord Buckley. Now also the home of The Exhibition of the American Gangster, a museum of the American Gangster.
- #85 – The 1871 birthplace of painter and caricaturist Lyonel Feininger.
- #94 – Home of "UNDER St. Mark's Theater", an alternative performance venue and black box theater from the 1970s.
- #96 & #98 – The Led Zeppelin album Physical Graffiti features a front and back cover design that depicts these two buildings, which feature carved faces. Mick Jagger, Keith Richards, and Peter Tosh are seated in front of #96 in the music video for the Rolling Stones song "Waiting on a Friend".
- #97 – Home of Yaffa Café from 1982 to 2014.
- #101 – From the mid-1970s to 1983, the poets Ted Berrigan and Alice Notley, who were married to each other, lived here. In Berrigan's "The Last Poem", he wrote: "101 St. Mark's Place, apt. 12A, NYC 10009/ New York. Friends appeared & disappeared, or wigged out/ Or stayed; inspiring strangers sadly died; everyone/ I ever knew aged tremendously, except me."
- #102 – Home of independent filmmaker Scott Crary.
- #103 – Home of singer/performer Klaus Nomi in the 1970s.
- #104 – Location of the Notre Dame Convent School from 1989 to 2002 and is now the site of George Jackson Academy.
- #105 – Early 1860s home of Uriah P. Levy, the first Jewish commodore of the U.S. Navy and who was also known for purchasing Monticello to work toward its restoration and preservation.
- #122 – Former location of Sin-é, a neighborhood café where Jeff Buckley performed a regular spot on Monday nights. Other musicians such as David Gray and Katell Keineg also performed there. Sin-é closed in the mid-1990s.
- #132 – Known at the time as St. Mark's Bar and Grill, this is the second location on the street to be used in the "Waiting on a Friend" video by the Rolling Stones. After several business changes at the address, a Rolling Stones-themed bar named Waiting on a Friend opened at the location in September 2018. However, by October 2019, the bar had permanently closed.

== Public transportation ==
- Bus:
  - M8 – Eastbound from Sixth Avenue to Avenue A
  - M2, M3 - Eastbound from Fifth to Fourth Avenues
  - M1, M55 - Eastbound from Fifth Avenue to Broadway (some weekday M1 service is extended to Fourth Avenue)
- Subway stations:
  - Astor Place on the IRT Lexington Avenue Line serving the 4, 6, and <6> trains
  - Eighth Street–New York University on the BMT Broadway Line serving the N, Q, R, and W trains
  - The A, B, C, D, E, F, <F>, and M trains of the subway stop on Sixth Avenue half a block south of Greenwich Avenue's southeastern end at the West Fourth Street–Washington Square station
  - The 1, 2, and 3 trains stop on Seventh Avenue one block north of Greenwich Avenue at the 14th Street station
  - The A, C, E, and L trains stop on Eighth Avenue and 14th Street half a block north of Greenwich Avenue's northwestern end at the 14th Street–Eighth Avenue station
  - The Ninth Street PATH train station on Ninth Street just north of Greenwich Avenue at Sixth Avenue

== In popular culture ==
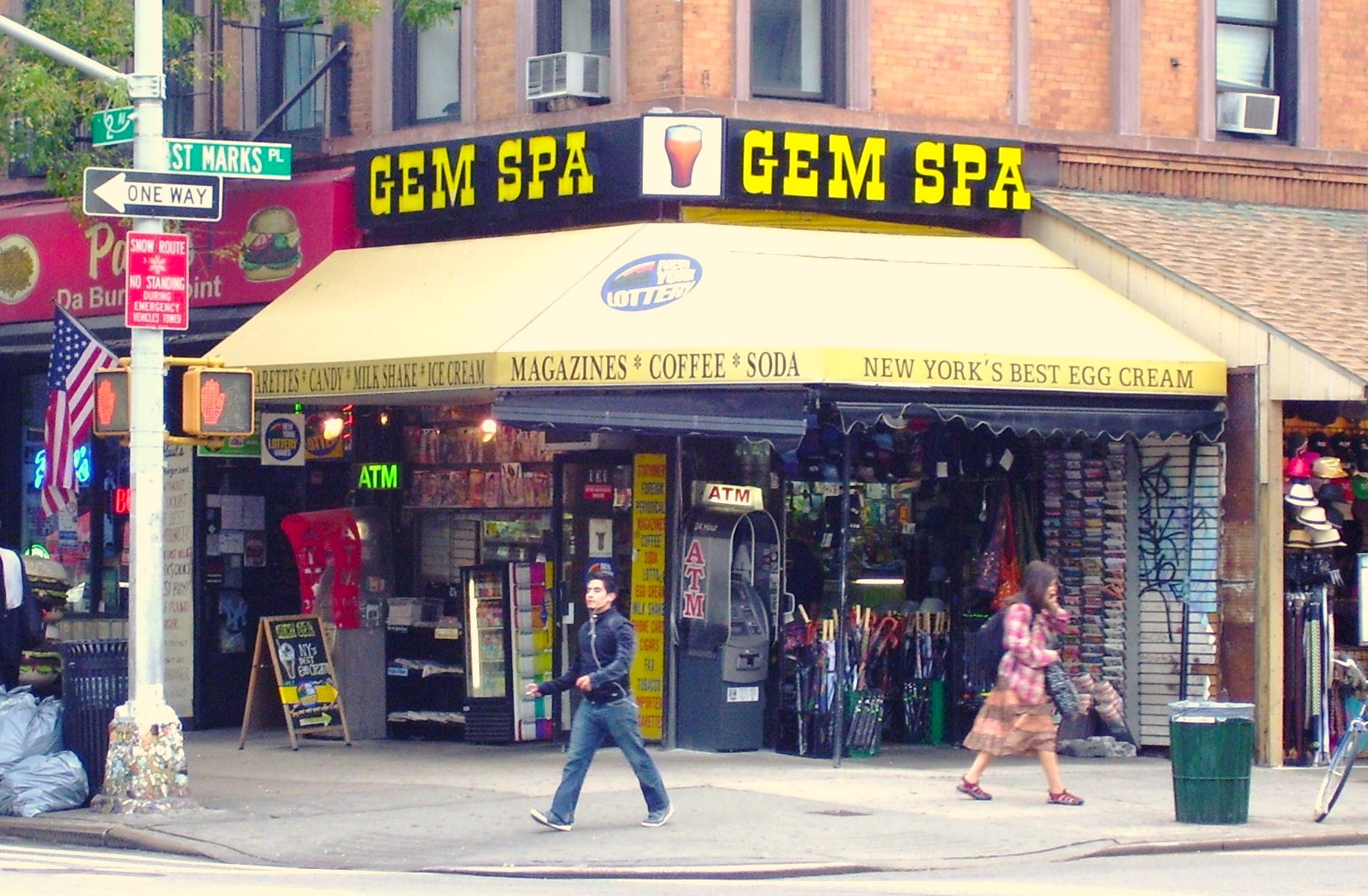
Gem Spa was the "corner store" for locals for nearly a century before closing due to financial hardship during the COVID-19 pandemic.

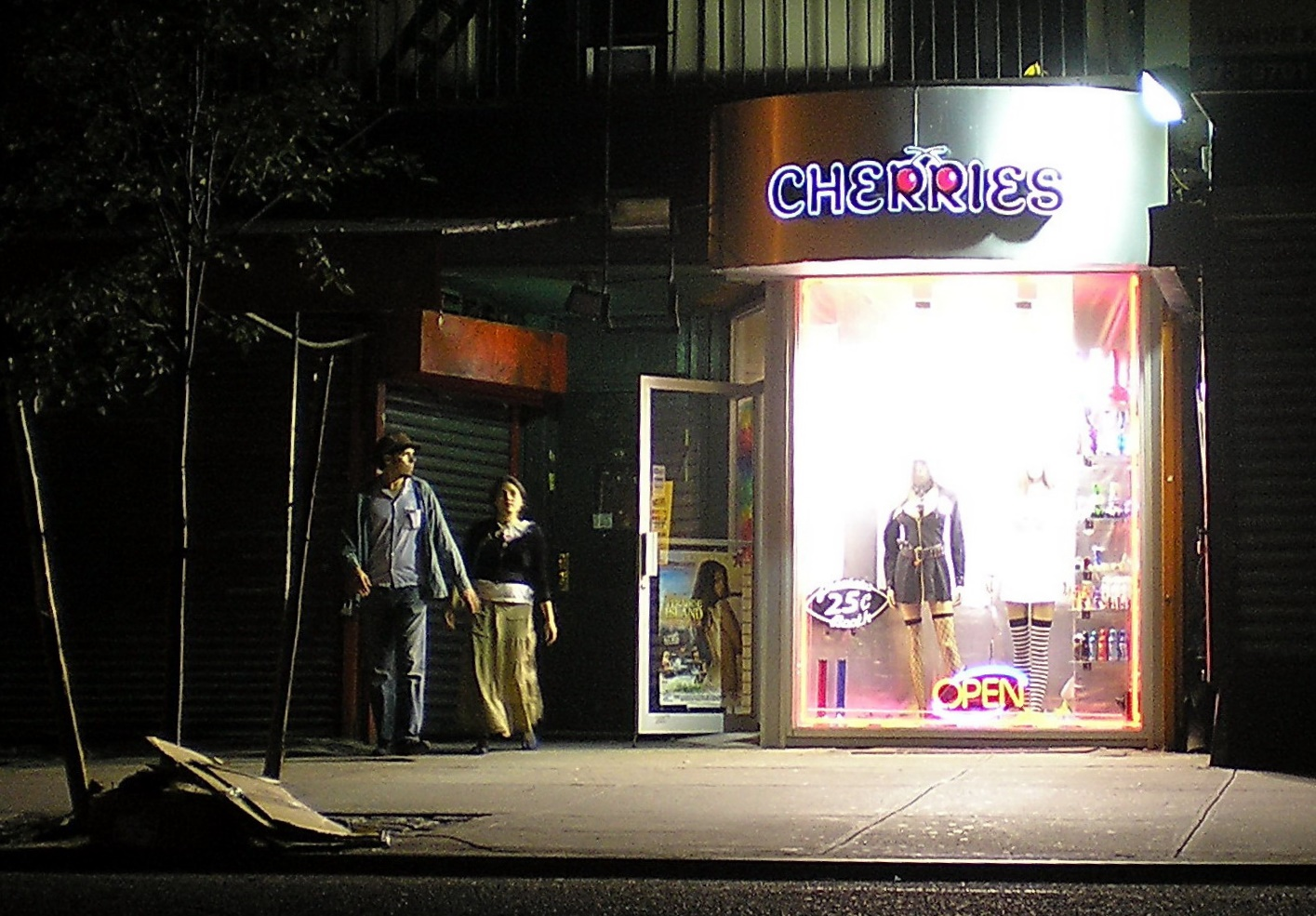
Cherries, an adult store on St. Mark's Place whose signage was part of Saturday Night Live's opening montage. The store closed in late 2011.

St. Mark's Place appears in a variety of works in popular culture. Notable examples include:

=== Music ===
- In the video for The Rolling Stones's "Waiting on a Friend", Mick Jagger, Keith Richards, and Peter Tosh are seen sitting on the stoop of 96–98 St. Mark's Place before Jagger and Richards walk to St. Mark's Bar and Grill at 132 St. Mark's Place to meet and perform with the rest of the band. In the song, Jagger mentions 8th Street.
- On the back cover of the first New York Dolls LP, the band is pictured standing in front of Gem Spa, a newspaper, magazine and tobacco store, which was known for its fountain egg creams, located on the southwest corner of St. Mark's Place and Second Avenue, at 131 Second Avenue.
- The narrator of Tom Paxton's "Talking Vietnam Potluck Blues", upon smelling marijuana on someone's breath during the Vietnam War remarks, "He smelled like midnight on St. Mark's Place."
- The Holy Modal Rounders mentioned the street in their song "Bad Boy" in the lyric "he'll sell your heart on St. Mark's Place in glassine envelopes/he'll cut it with a pig's heart, and burn the chumps and dopes".
- Earl Slick's 2003 solo album Zig-Zag features a song called "Saint Mark's Place".
- In Lou Reed's song "Sally Can't Dance", Sally walks down St. Mark's Place where she lives in a rent controlled apartment.
- In the King Missile song "Detachable Penis" vocalist John S. Hall states, "Then, as I walked down Second Avenue towards St. Mark's Place / Where all those people sell used books and other junk on the street / I saw my penis lying on a blanket next to a broken toaster oven."
- The album We Are Only Riders by The Jeffrey Lee Pierce Sessions Project features a song called "Saint Mark's Place", a duet with Lydia Lunch.
- The music video for Billy Joel's 1986 song "A Matter of Trust" was shot in the Electric Circus building and features extensive footage of the block.
- The Replacements' 1987 song "Alex Chilton" contains the line, "Checkin' his stash by the trash at St. Mark's Place."
- Moe's song "New York City" contains the line, "Hits his brakes and points out the freaks on St. Mark's Place."
- Kirsty McGee's Frost album (2004) contains a song called "Saint Mark's Place".
- The Tom Waits song "Potter's Field" from his Foreign Affairs album contains the line "You'll learn why liquor makes a stool pigeon rat on every face that ever left his shadow down on St. Mark's Place."
- The Rank and File song "I Went Walking", on their 1982 album Sundown, presents a cynical look at the St. Mark's Place of that time, containing the lines: "Have you ever seen a sheep in a porkpie hat? Ever see a lemming dressed all in black? Well, you might have been there, but I'll tell you just in case: Just take a walk down St. Mark's Place."
- The Sharp Things album, Foxes and Hounds, features a song called "95 Saint Mark's Place".
- The They Might Be Giants song "On The Drag" includes the line "The allure of St. Mark's Place".
- Joe Purdy's song "The City" has a verse, "When we left Brooklyn it was raining so hard. / Come up on 8th and the rain it cleared off. / We're just people watching on 3rd and St. Mark's."
- The Marcy Playground song "Vampires of New York," on their debut album, Marcy Playground, includes the line "Come take in 8th street after dark".
- The New York anti-folk artist Jeffrey Lewis references St. Mark's Place in the song "Scowling Crackhead Ian" as the location in which Lewis and the eponymous Ian grew up and remain.

=== Television ===
- In the double-episode season six opening episode of Mad Men, "The Doorway", Betty Francis goes to St. Mark's Place to find a girl who has run away after losing her parents, and in season 6, episode 4 ("To Have and To Hold", set in early 1968), Joan Harris and her hometown friend Kate visit the Electric Circus nightclub, located at 19–25 St. Marks Place, during a night out on the town.
- In the opening credits to Saturday Night Live (c. 2010), a shot of Cherries adult entertainment store's neon signage is featured.
- In the season 3 Sex and the City episode "Hot Child In The City", Sarah Jessica Parker's character Carrie goes to get her shoe fixed on St. Mark's Place and ends up dating a man who works at a comic book store on the block. Part of the episode is filmed at the actual St. Mark's Comics.
- In the season 9 episode of Friends titled "The One with the Mugging", it is revealed that Ross was mugged outside St. Mark's Comics as a child.
- The second-season finale of the Comedy Central series Broad City is set around the main characters on a night out along St. Mark's Place, and the episode is titled "St. Mark's".
- AEW wrestler Hook is billed from St. Mark's Place.

=== Film ===
- In Andy Warhol's Trash, most of the street scenes of Joe Dallesandro were filmed on St Mark's Place.
- In the films Ghostbusters II (1989) and Ghostbusters: Afterlife (2021), Ray's Occult Books, a bookstore run by Ray Stantz, is said to be located at 201 St. Mark's Place. The exterior of one of the two storefronts at 33 St. Mark's Place, was used to portray the store in Ghostbusters II.

== See also ==
- East Side Hebrew Institute (ESHI)
