= Marlton House =

Hotel in Manhattan, New York

Coordinates: 40°43′57″N 73°59′49″W

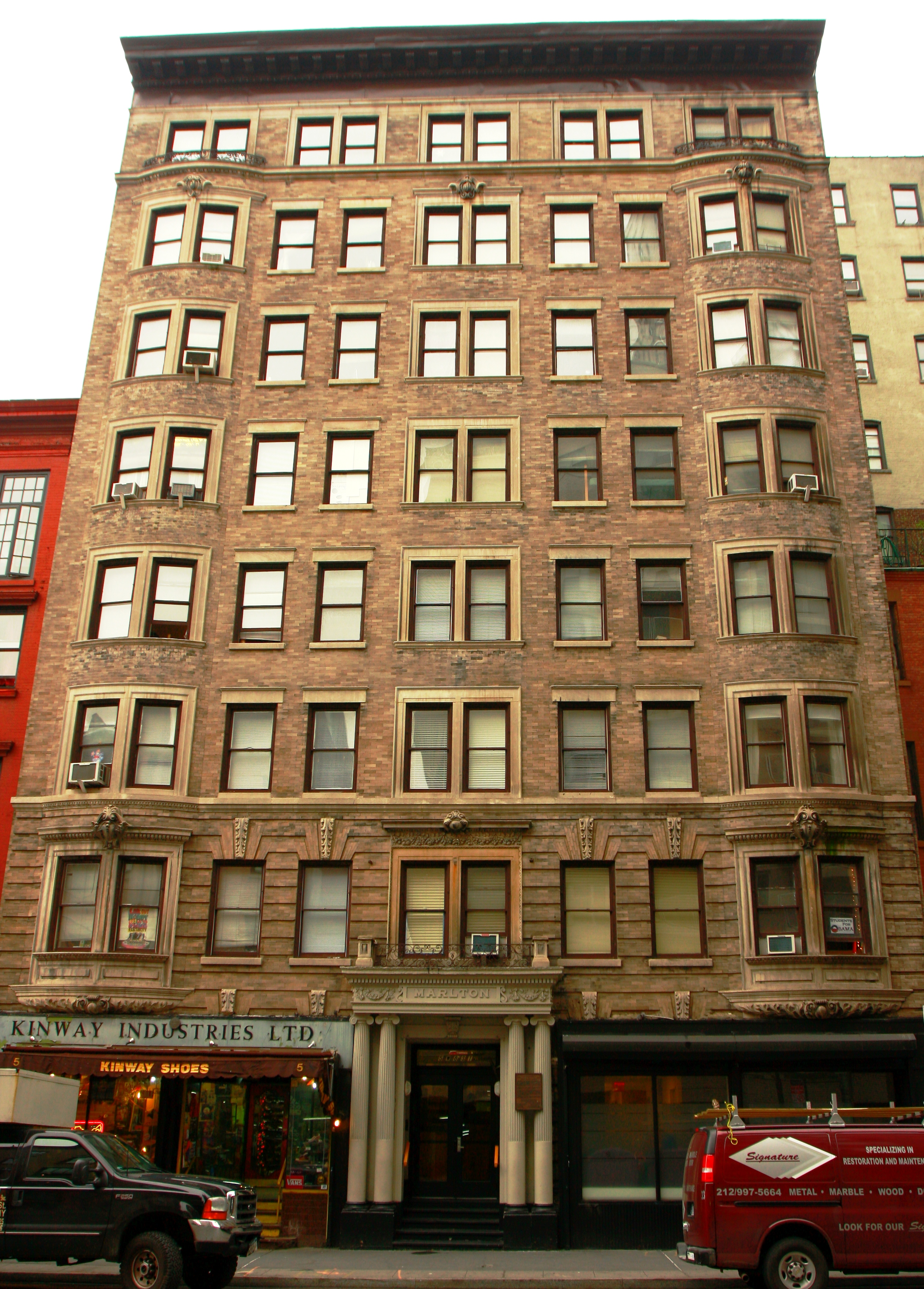
Marlton House in 2008

Marlton House, or Hotel Marlton, is located at 5 West 8th Street between Fifth and Sixth Avenues, in the Greenwich Village neighborhood of Manhattan, New York City. It is notable for having housed many famous artistic figures, especially during the peak of the area's bohemian scene.

== History ==
The Marlton Hotel was built in 1900 and, for much of its existence, served as a single room occupancy (SRO) hotel for mostly transient guests. However, many guests stayed for months or years at a time. Because of its location in the Village's cultural community as well as its relative affordability, the Marlton Hotel became popular amongst struggling actors, poets and artists looking for work in the city.

In 1987, The New School leased the building as a dormitory, housing primarily sophomore, junior and senior students enrolled at Parsons The New School for Design, Eugene Lang College The New School for Liberal Arts, Mannes College of Music, and the New School for Jazz and Contemporary Music. In 2012, it was bought and renovated by hotelier Sean MacPherson.

In 2012, BD Hotels in partnership with Sean McPherson purchased the Marlton House with the intention of restoring the historic property and operating it as a mid-range boutique in the spirit of its original beatnik brand. Richard Born, a principal of BD Hotels says the hotel will have a bar and restaurant component and will not be "terribly pricey". The hotel reopened in September 2013.

== Notable guests ==
Writers

- Jack Kerouac wrote The Subterraneans and Tristessa while living at the Marlton Hotel.
- Gregory Corso
- Neal Cassady
- Carolyn Cassady
- Daniel Everett
- Delmore Schwartz
- Edna St. Vincent Millay
- Valerie Solanas, who shot Andy Warhol (memorialized in the film I Shot Andy Warhol), lived in room 214

Actors

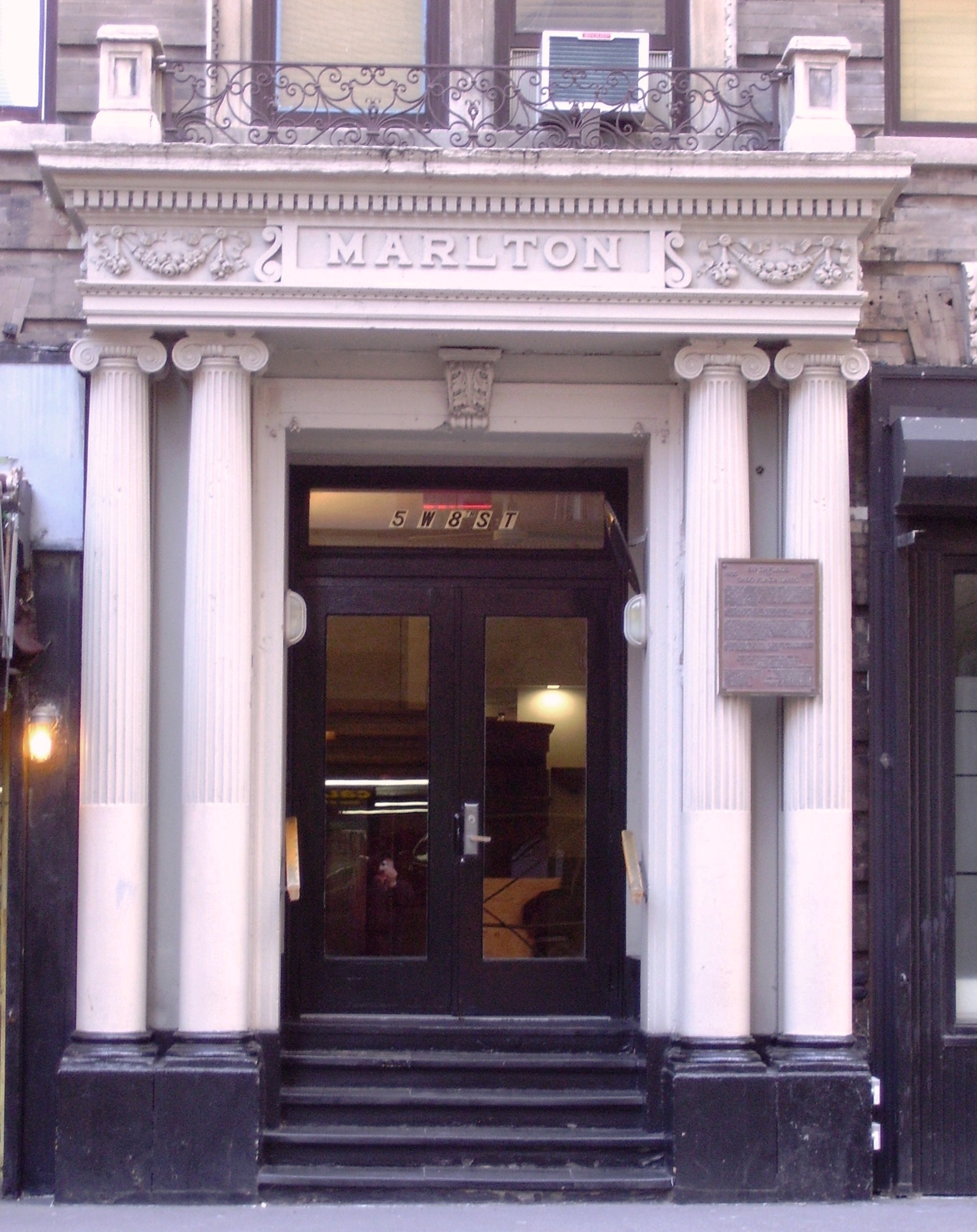
The entrance to Marlton House (2011)

- Lillian Gish lived in room 408, described by Albert Bigelow Paine in 1932 as a "tiny room" she stayed in to save money, in which she "cooked tinned things and tea using a sterno lamp" in 1913.
- John Barrymore
- Kay Francis
- Maggie Smith
- John Neville
- Claire Bloom
- Julie Andrews
- Mickey Rourke
- John Lithgow

Others

- Galo Plaza, a South American politician who served as the President of Ecuador, was born at the Marlton Hotel in 1906 to his diplomat parents.
- Isabel Dutaud Nagle, wife of sculptor Gaston Lachaise stayed at the Hotel Marlton when she came to visit Lachaise in New York. She was recorded there in 1915, and wrote many poems over the years on Hotel Marlton stationary.
- Lenny Bruce, comedian who lived at the hotel during his trial for obscenity in 1964.
- Norman Carton, Abstract Expressionist artist
- Carmen McRae, American jazz singer
- Ron Gorchov, American artist
- Miriam Makeba
- Hannah Hooper, vocalist and keyboardist in the rock band Grouplove
- Annie Clark, a.k.a. St. Vincent (musician) stayed at the hotel while recording her album "Masseduction".
- Joshua Lawrence, English photographer
