= St. Mark's Comics =

New York City retailer

Coordinates: 40.72945°N 73.98899°W

- Type: Private
- Industry: Retail
- Founded: May 1983
- Headquarters: 51 35th Street, Brooklyn, New York, United States
- Number of locations: 1 (formerly 3)
- Area served: New York City
- Products: Comic books; Graphic novels; Manga; Trading cards; Action figures; Collectibles
- Owner: Mitch Cutler
- Website: www.stmarkscomics.com

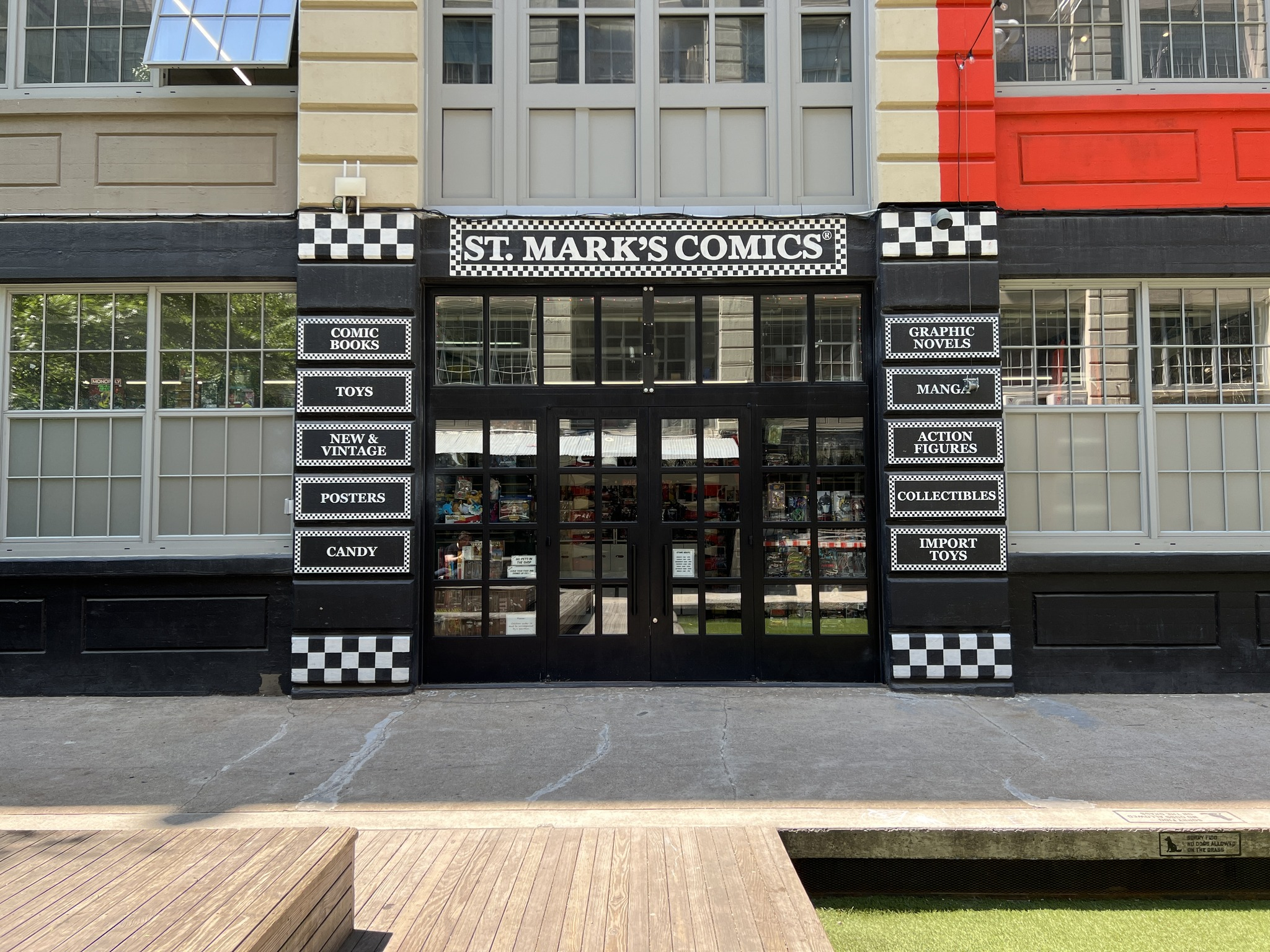
The outdoor storefront of St Mark's Comics at the Industry City location.

St. Mark's Comics is a New York City comic book retailer. It opened its first store at 11 St. Mark's Place in Manhattan in 1983, and eventually opened two other locations, in Lower Manhattan and one in Brooklyn Heights. In late January 2019, St. Mark's Comics announced it would be going out of business at the end of February 2019. On July 30, 2021, the store re-opened at a new location in Industry City, Brooklyn.

The store's St. Mark's Place location was noted for its underground sensibility and cluttered, over-stuffed decor, and for employing female staff members long before that became the norm in the comics retailing industry. In addition to comics, graphic novels, and manga, St. Mark's Comics sold trading cards, action figures, toys, T-shirts, and other pop culture collectibles.

== History ==
St. Mark's Comics was founded in 1983, and acquired a year later by Mitch Cutler when he was still in his teens.

Cutler founded a second location at 148 Montague Street in Brooklyn Heights in 1988. That location closed in 2012. The store had another location at 150 Chambers Street in lower Manhattan that closed in 2004 in part due to the after-effects of the September 11 attacks.

A fire damaged the St. Mark's location and some of its inventory in 2011, however, the store was able to recover.

On January 29, 2019, Cutler announced that St. Mark's Comics would be closing at the end of February. Reasons cited by Cutler included 90-hour works weeks, higher rents and a changing marketplace. The announcement prompted tributes from comics creators including Neil Gaiman, Brian Michael Bendis, and Dean Haspiel.

On July 30, 2021, St. Mark's Comics re-opened at a new location in Industry City, Brooklyn.

== In popular culture ==
=== Comics ===
In issue 12 of Brian K. Vaughan's comics series Ex Machina #12, the main character, Mitchell Hundred, laments the closing of a beloved comic book store in Lower Manhattan following the September 11 attacks, and a friend mentions some real-life comics shops that are still open, including St. Mark's Comics, Jim Hanley's Universe, and Midtown Comics.

=== Television ===
- In the season 3 Sex and the City episode "Hot Child In The City" (2000), Sarah Jessica Parker's character Carrie goes to get her shoe fixed on St. Mark's Place and ends up dating a man who works at a comic book store on the block. Part of the episode is filmed at the actual St. Mark's Comics.
- In the season 9 episode of Friends titled "The One with the Mugging" (2003), it is revealed that, as a child, Ross Geller was a patron of the store, and mugged outside it by Phoebe Buffay, decades before they became friends as adults.
