= Daniel LeRoy House =

Historic house in Manhattan, New York

- U.S. National Register of Historic Places
- New York State Register of Historic Places
- New York City Landmark
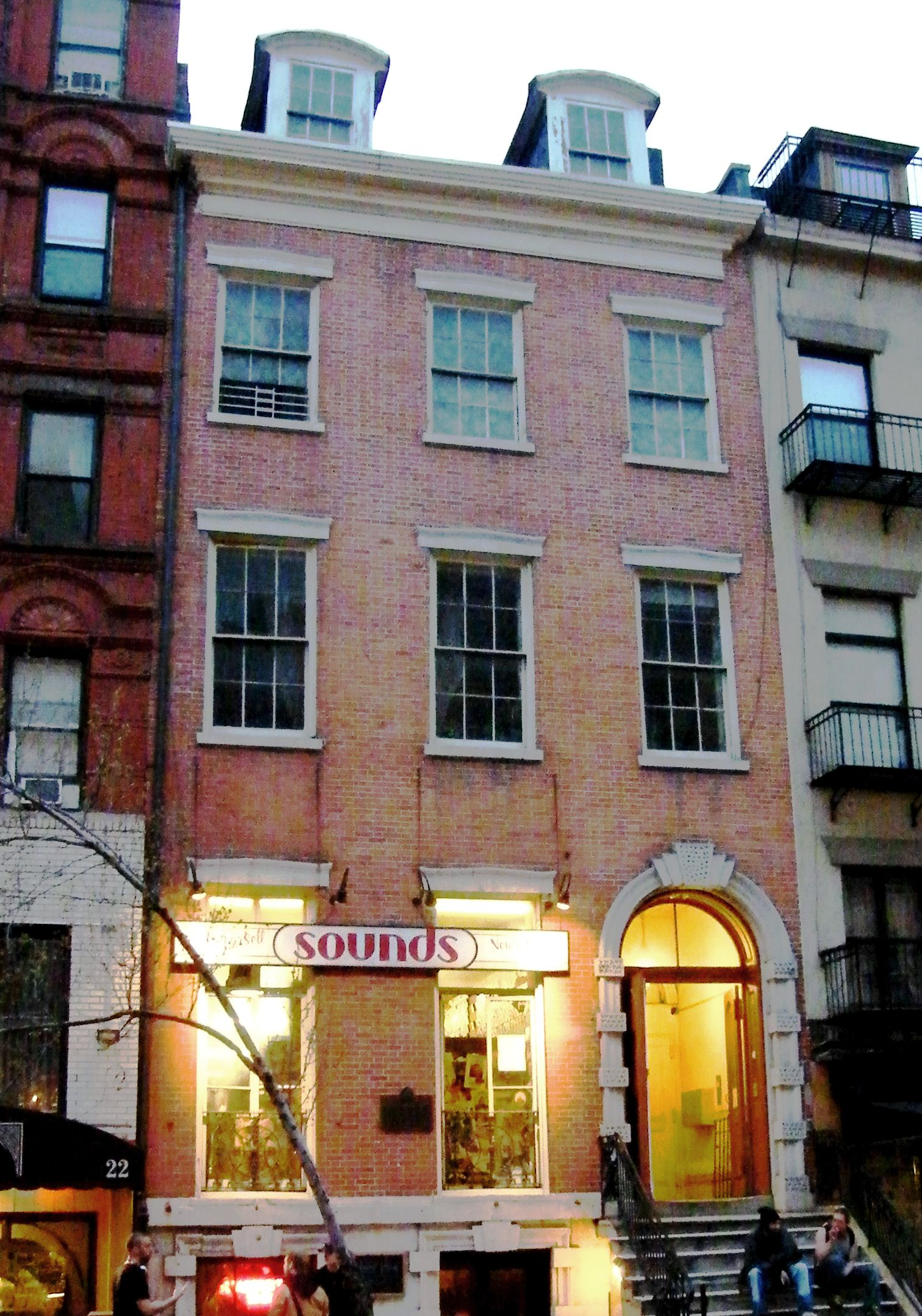
- Daniel LeRoy House in 2009

- Location within Lower Manhattan Location within New York Location within the United States
- Location: 20 St. Mark's Place, New York, New York
- Coordinates: 40°43′43″N 73°59′20″W
- Area: less than one acre
- Built: 1832
- Architectural style: Federal
- NRHP reference No.: 82001200
- NYSRHP No.: 06101.001708
- NYCL No.: 0562

Significant dates
- Added to NRHP: October 29, 1982
- Designated NYSRHP: September 29, 1982
- Designated NYCL: November 19, 1969

The Daniel LeRoy House is a historic property located at 20 St. Marks Place in the East Village neighborhood of Manhattan in New York City.

== History ==
The Greek Revival building was built in 1832 as part of a development by Thomas E. Davis of 3½-story brick houses which spanned both sides of the street. The Daniel LeRoy house is one of the three surviving houses of this development, the other two being 25 St. Marks Place and the Hamilton-Holly House at 4 St. Marks Place. It has a marble entrance ornamented with vermiculated blocks. Daniel LeRoy, a South Street merchant and son of wealthy New Yorker Herman LeRoy, married Susan Fish, daughter of Adjutant General Nicholas Fish and Elizabeth Stuyvesant (a daughter of Peter Stuyvesant), and sister to U.S. Senator Hamilton Fish.

The building was designated a landmark by the New York City Landmarks Preservation Commission in 1969, and was added to the National Register of Historic Places on October 29, 1982. In Spring 1998, restorations were made on the house, including repainting, repointing brickwork and replacing cornices.

== See also ==
- National Register of Historic Places listings in Manhattan below 14th Street
- List of New York City Designated Landmarks in Manhattan below 14th Street
