= Slovenian Church of St. Cyril in New York =

Slovenian Church of St. Cyril, New York
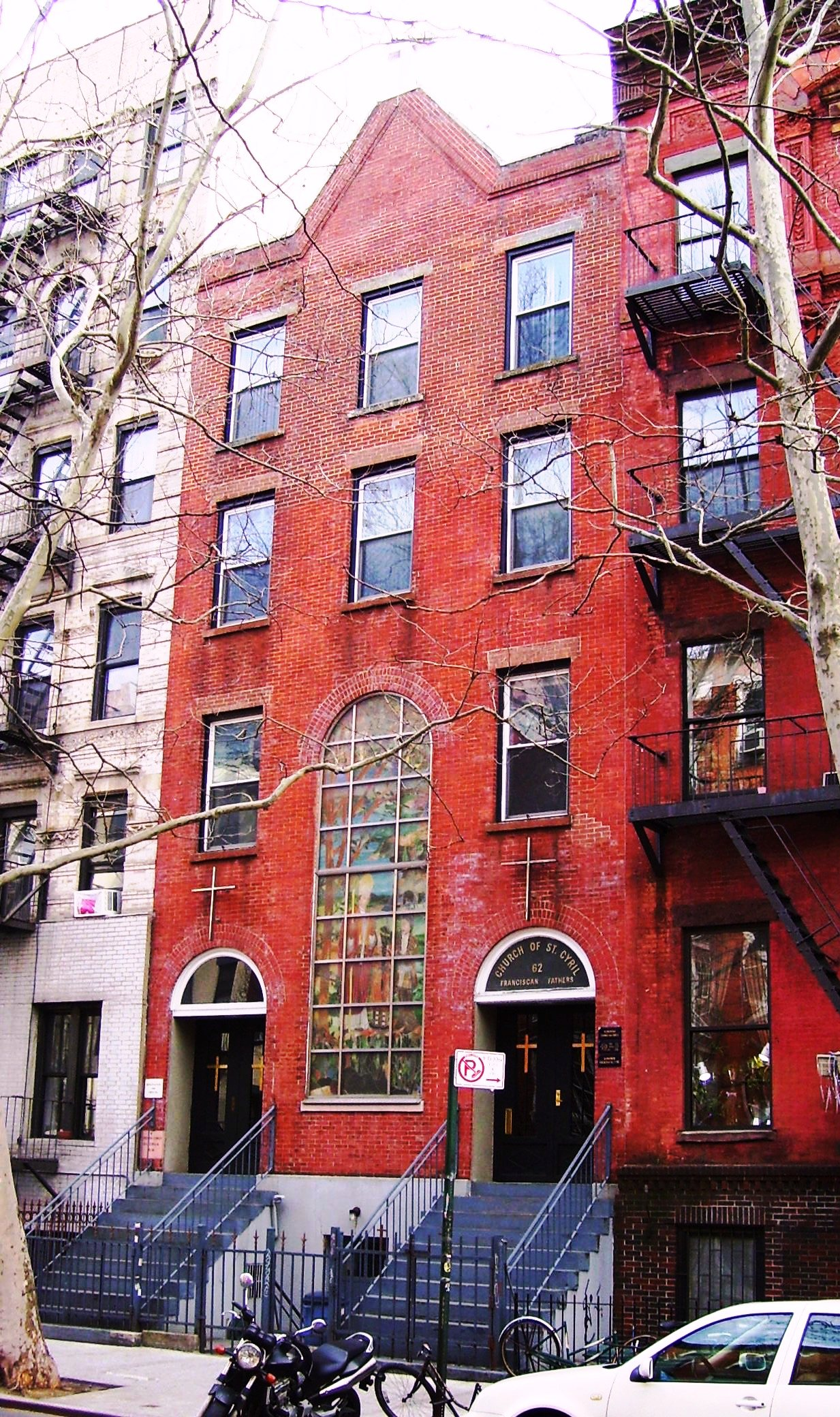
- Church of St. Cyril 62 St. Mark's Place
- Slovenian Church of St. Cyril, New York
- 40°43′41″N 73°59′11″W
- Location: East Village; Manhattan, New York City
- Country: United States
- Denomination: Roman Catholic
- Website: www.slovenskacerkev-ny.si

History
- Founded: 1916

Architecture
- Years built: 1916

Administration
- Archdiocese: New York

The Slovenian Church of St. Cyril in New York is a historic religious institution located in the East Village neighborhood of Manhattan and Slovenia's cultural center in New York City. It holds historical significance for Slovenia and its people, having played a pivotal role for over a century, including during Slovenia's independence. It is currently the only place in New York where Slovenians meet. Since no Slovenian businesses have offices in New York, apart from the country's delegation to the United Nations, it is the city's sole Slovenian location.

This church has been used by the Slovenian immigrant community in New York City for many years.

== History ==
The roots of the Church of St. Cyril date back to the late 19th century when the first Slovenian immigrants arrived in New York City. These early Slovenian settlers chose the East Village for their community due to its proximity to a German-speaking population, as both groups shared a common language owing to their historical ties under Austrian-Hungarian rule. Initially, many Slovenian immigrants in the East Village found work in the neighborhood's hat-making industry, facilitated by the presence of a substantial Orthodox Jewish community.

In July 1916, the Slovenian immigrants collectively purchased a property on St. Marks Place for $19,000. On Memorial Day 1916, they celebrated the establishment of the new church with the blessing of the cornerstone. The first mass was on Independence Day, July 4, 1916, following a parade from the previous German church used by the Slovenians, the now-demolished St. Nicholas Church, to the new church of St. Cyril.

The new church included an apartment for the resident priest and a cultural hall for community gatherings. Over the years, the Slovenian community expanded into the surrounding streets.

However, as the neighborhood's demographics and dynamics changed over the decades, some Slovenian immigrants began to move away from the East Village, citing increasing expenses and safety concerns. Despite these challenges, approximately 600 individuals from the Slovenian community continue to attend services at the Church of St. Cyril, maintaining their cultural and religious ties.

=== Renovation and preservation ===
Between 1991 and 1997, the Church of St. Cyril underwent a significant renovation. The renovation was overseen by Father Krizolog Cimerman, a Slovenian priest known for his dedication to the Slovenian community in New York. The project included the installation of a new roof, updated lighting, and a complete interior redecoration. Funding for this renovation came from contributions by Slovenians both in the United States and abroad, as well as a generous donation of $350,000 from the Slovenian Government, arranged by Cimerman.

=== During the 1991 independence war ===
In 1991, during the Slovenia's independence war, the Church was a Slovenian information center. It provided American media and others with necessary information about the formation of the new state during and after the independence war. At that time, Slovenia did not have diplomatic representations in New York, which were only established following its admission to the United Nations in 1992.

== As a cultural center ==
Throughout its history, the Church of St. Cyril has functioned as a cultural center for the Slovenian community. Slovenian presidents, prime ministers, and foreign ministers have visited the church, and the church hosts cultural events and celebrations on religious and Slovenian holidays, including yearly Martinovo fest and receptions during the United Nations General Assembly week.

== Legacy ==
The Church of St. Cyril in New York continues to operate while several Slovenian churches elsewhere in the United States have closed down. In 2024, Slovenians in New York founded the Slovenian Society New York, which, among other goals, strives to keep the church active in support its mission to unite Slovenians in New York.

The church has been a subject of several publications, including a book, published in 2020.
