= Antonio Parra Velasco =

Ecuadorian thinker, diplomat and internationalist

Antonio Parra Velasco (born Guayaquil, Ecuador; December 17, 1900 – October 28, 1994) was an Ecuadorian thinker, diplomat, and internationalist.

Velasco served as Ecuador's ambassador to France, Great Britain and Venezuela, and was awarded the "Premio Eugenio Espejo" in 1987 in the culture category.

== About Antonio Parra Velasco ==
He studied at the Lycée Janson-de-Sailly. He graduated with a Bachelor of Philosophy from the Sorbonne University.He was a Rector of the University of Guayaquil from 1957 to 1963. He graduated as a lawyer at the University of Guayaquil.
