= Juliet Corson =

United States cookery educator (1841–1897)

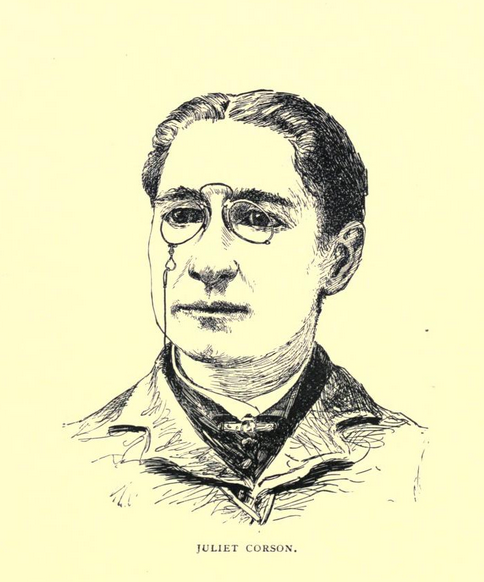
- Juliet Corson c. 1888
- Born: January 14, 1841; Boston, United States
- Died: June 18, 1897 (aged 56); New York City

Juliet Corson (January 14, 1841 – June 18, 1897) was a leader in cookery education in the latter half of the 19th century in the United States. She contributed to a weekly column in the New York Times that ran for five years, 1875–1880.

== Biography ==
She was born in Boston, attended the Raymond and Brooklyn Institutes, and was secretary of the New York Free Training School for Women 1872/3. Beginning 1872, she devoted herself to study and experiments on healthful and economical cookery, and dietetics. She founded the New York School of Cookery in 1876 and was its superintendent until 1883, when she was obliged to close it on account of failing health. This was New York City's first successful cooking school.

In 1877, to help the poor learn how to cook on tight budgets, she authored and distributed a 33-page booklet Fifteen Cent Dinners for Families of Six, which became quite popular. After 1883, she was actively engaged, with intervals of illness, in writing and in lecturing throughout the United States. In Philadelphia, Montreal, and Oakland, California, her efforts led to the teaching of cookery in the public schools. In 1881 the French consul general at New York asked Corson about her works and methods, for the purpose of adapting them to the needs of the French educational system.

== Writings ==
- Fifteen-Cent Dinners for Workingmen's Families, published by the author for free distribution to working-people earning $1.50, or less, a day (New York, 1877)
- Twenty-Five Cent Dinners for Families of Six (1877)
- Cooking Manual (1878)
- Cooking-School Text-Book and Housekeeper's Guide (1878)
- New Family Cook-Book (1885)
- Local American Cookery (1885)
- Practical American Cookery (1886)
- Diet for Invalids and Children (1886)
- Family living on $500 a Year (1886)

She also wrote many newspaper articles and pamphlets.
