= Spätkauf =

Type of convenience shop found in Germany

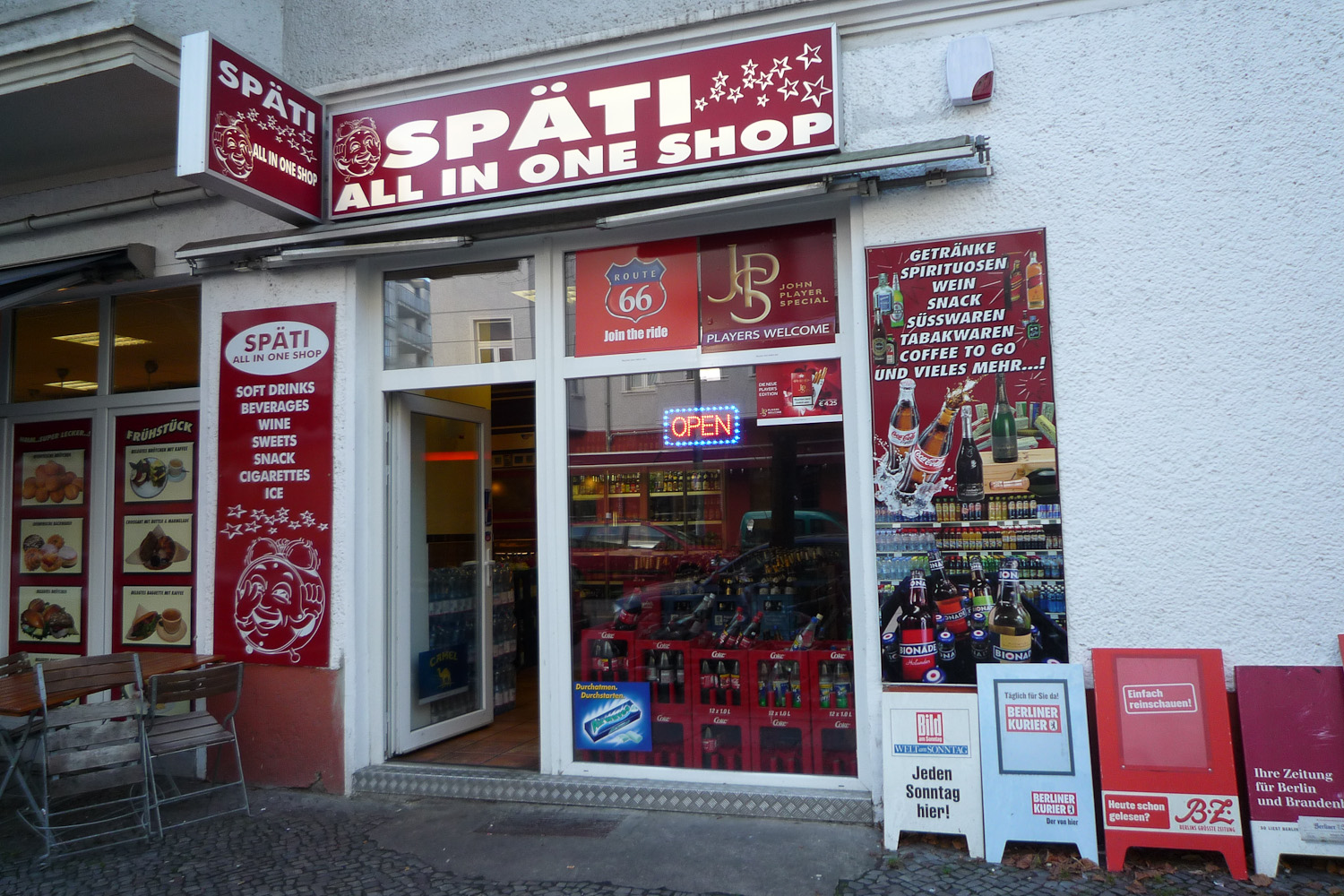
A Spätkauf in Berlin

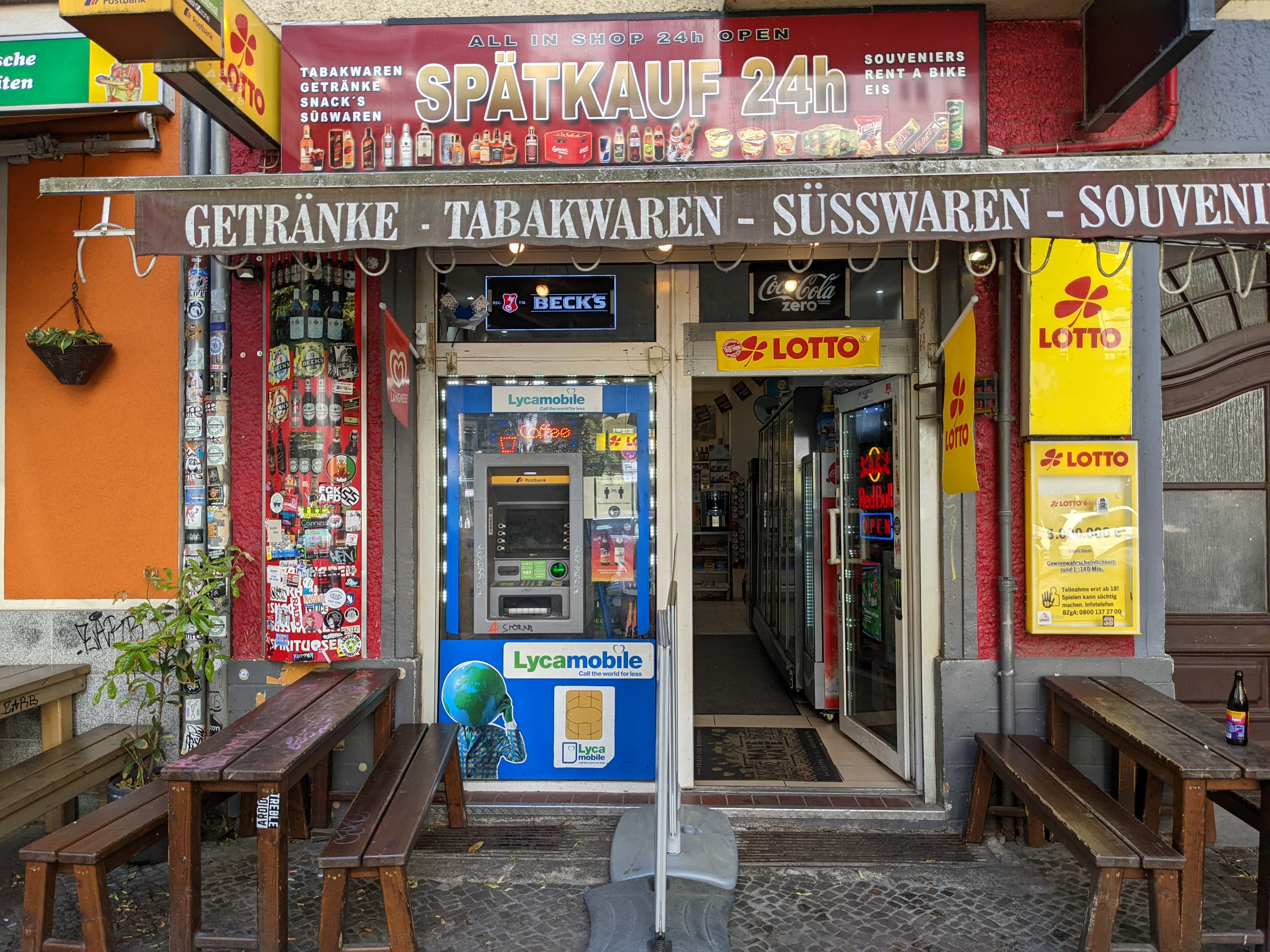
A Spätkauf with outdoor seating, where patrons can consume beer and snacks al fresco during warmer months

Spätverkauf, Spätkauf or Späti (German pronunciation: [ʃpeːtiː]) is a type of convenience shop found generally in East German cities, such as Berlin, Dresden, or Leipzig, that operates late at night past usual shopping hours, often 24 hours per day.

Translating literally to "late purchase", Spätis mostly sell alcohol and tobacco but may also sell groceries or everyday items. Some shops may also offer internet access, postal services, and usually feature small benches for clients to sit on while drinking beer. With the ubiquity of mobile internet, many internet cafés have since extended their range of products in order to function as a Späti. Most shops are run by Turkish or Vietnamese migrant families and are a part of the culture of Berlin's local neighbourhoods known as Kieze. Similar kinds of shops with different regional names are found in the Ruhr area, the Rhineland, Hanover, and Hamburg.

A ban on Sunday hours in 2016 caused a decline in the total number of Spätis, about 800 according to the organization Berliner Späti e.V.

== History ==
The Spätverkauf was established in the German Democratic Republic in the second half of the 20th century for workers coming home from late night shifts. They were usually shops of the state-owned retail chains Handelsorganisation and Konsum. While regular shops would close at 6 p.m., Spätverkauf would be open until 7 p.m. or 8 p.m., while shops in big cities could sometimes have longer opening hours. The word "Spätkauf" was used in West Berlin as early as the 1980s. After the fall of the Berlin Wall, the shortened term "Späti" was adopted for other stores extending regular business hours. "Späti" has also come to use in some southern German cities such as Stuttgart and Munich.

=== Legal status and political debates ===
According to Berlin's Ladenschlussgessetz (shop closing law), only flowers, print media, baked goods and dairy products may be sold on Sundays between 7 a.m. and 4 p.m. Tourist offerings and beverages may only be offered between 1 p.m. and 8 p.m. on Sundays. The sale of alcohol is not allowed on Sundays.

In March 2012, a Prenzlauer Berg resident reported 48 stores that violated the shop closing law to the Berlin Ordnungsamt (Office of Public Order). This led to several Spätkäufe being fined between €150 and €2500. One in particular, Kollwitz 66, later drew attention with a counter-campaign by displaying the name and phone number of the person reporting the violations at the shop and publishing them on Facebook.

In a radio interview, Berlin City Councilor Torsten Kühne stated that while the Ordnungsamt must thoroughly investigate every violation of the shop closing law, it lacked the resources to do so.

In October 2012, the CDU in Berlin's Pankow district tried to introduce legislation that would have legalized Berlin's Spätkäufe. However, this failed. In June 2015, a petition with the hashtag #RettetdieSpätis ("save the Spätis") was started on the website change.org, which demanded an adjustment of the shop closing law that would have changed the legal status of Spätkäufe to something similar to gas stations and stores at train stations. Fines of €35,000 had been imposed on Spätkauf operators in the district of Friedrichshain-Kreuzberg in 2015, and €70,000 in the district of Neukölln. Bündnis 90/Die Grünen demanded an exemption for Spätkäufe for a number of hours on Sundays, but this was not supported by the governing parties SPD and CDU. Martin Delius, a Pirate Party member, proposed to convert Spätkäufe into charging stations for pedelecs, which would have given them the same legal status as gas stations.

In 2016, a Spätkauf located in the district of Charlottenburg-Wilmersdorf was denied permission to open on Sundays by the district office under the threat of a €1,500 fine. After the owner sued before the Administrative Court of Berlin, the court ruled in May 2019 that Berlin's Spätkäufe must remain closed on Sundays as a matter of principle. In the reasoning, it is said that Spätis mainly offer products to the close surrounding area and did not qualify for an exemption as a tourist store.

=== Similar shops ===
Such places exist with different names in the Ruhr area, the Rhineland, Hanover, and Hamburg. They can be called Trinkhalle (drinking hall), Kiosk, or Büdchen (small stall). Initially, it was popular for such shops to have windows where customers ordered from outside, but now they are usually small bodega-style shops. In addition to selling goods, they provide a space for social interaction and local party culture. Cologne alone has about 1000 Büdchen. These establishments are part of the town culture, objects of research, city tour destinations and subjects for calendar pictures. Since 2016 the Düsseldorfer Büdchentag (Düsseldorf day of small stalls) celebrates the local kiosk culture in Düsseldorf with a special day in the summer, attracting tourists and Düsseldorfer alike.

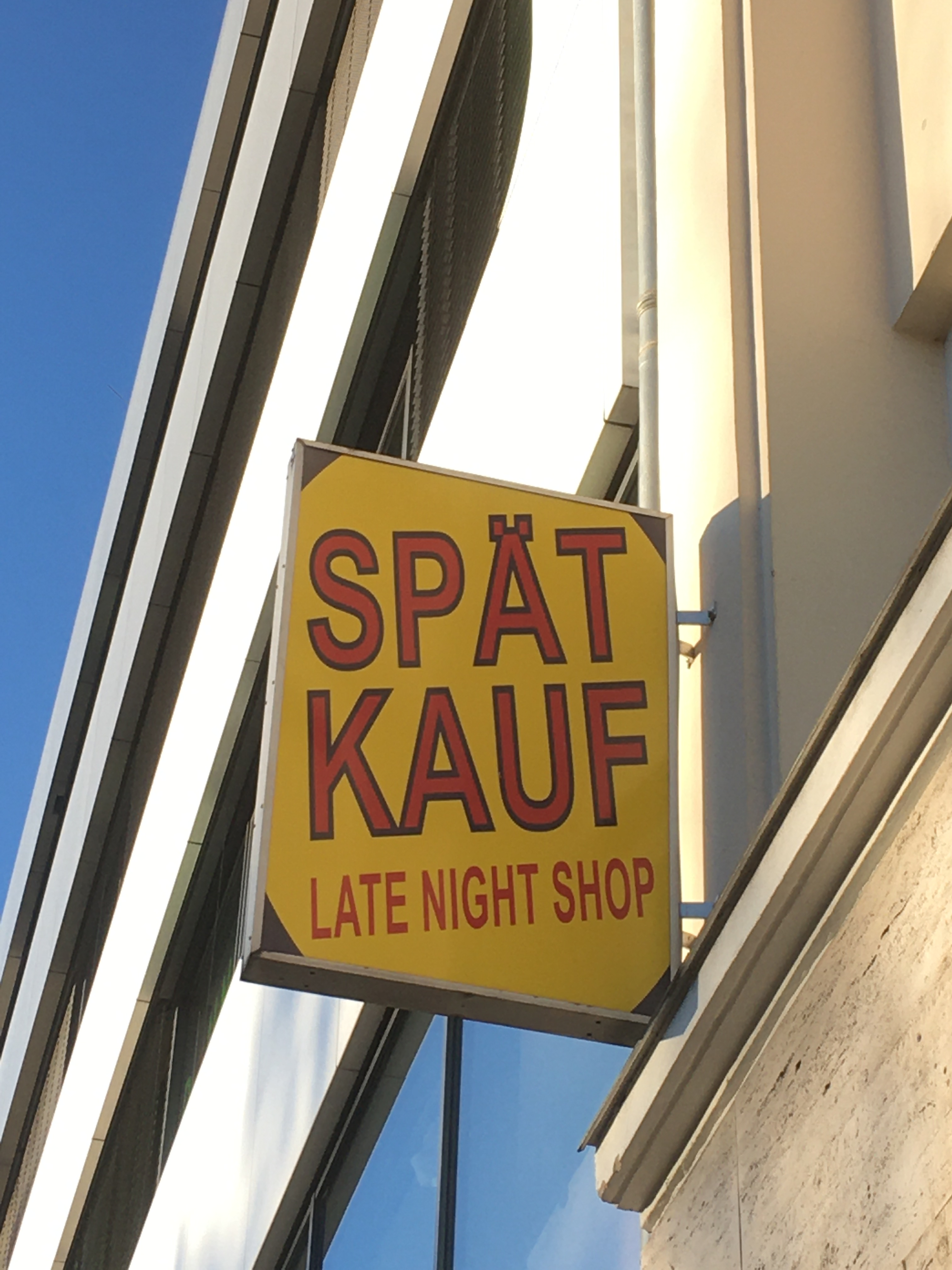

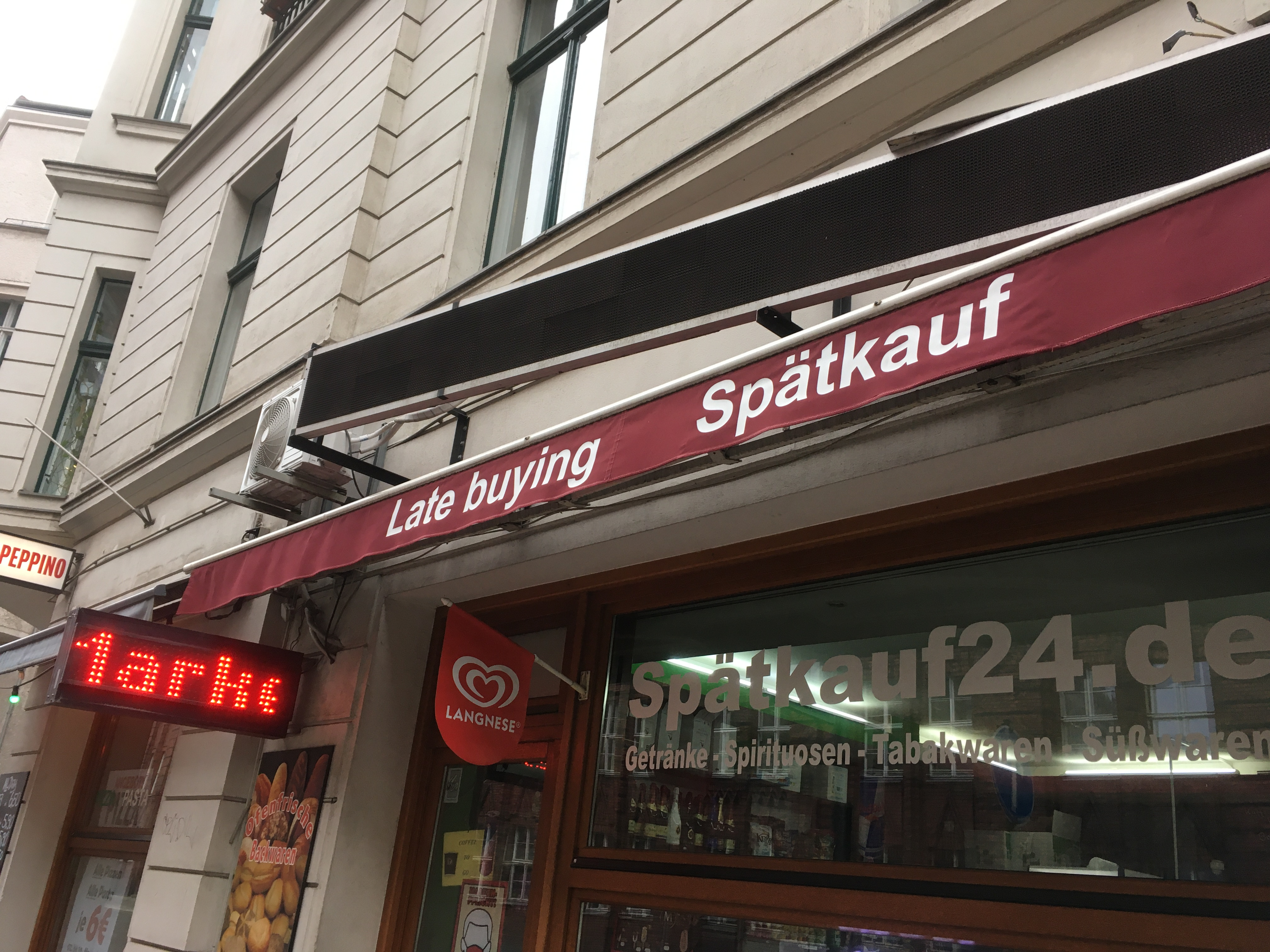

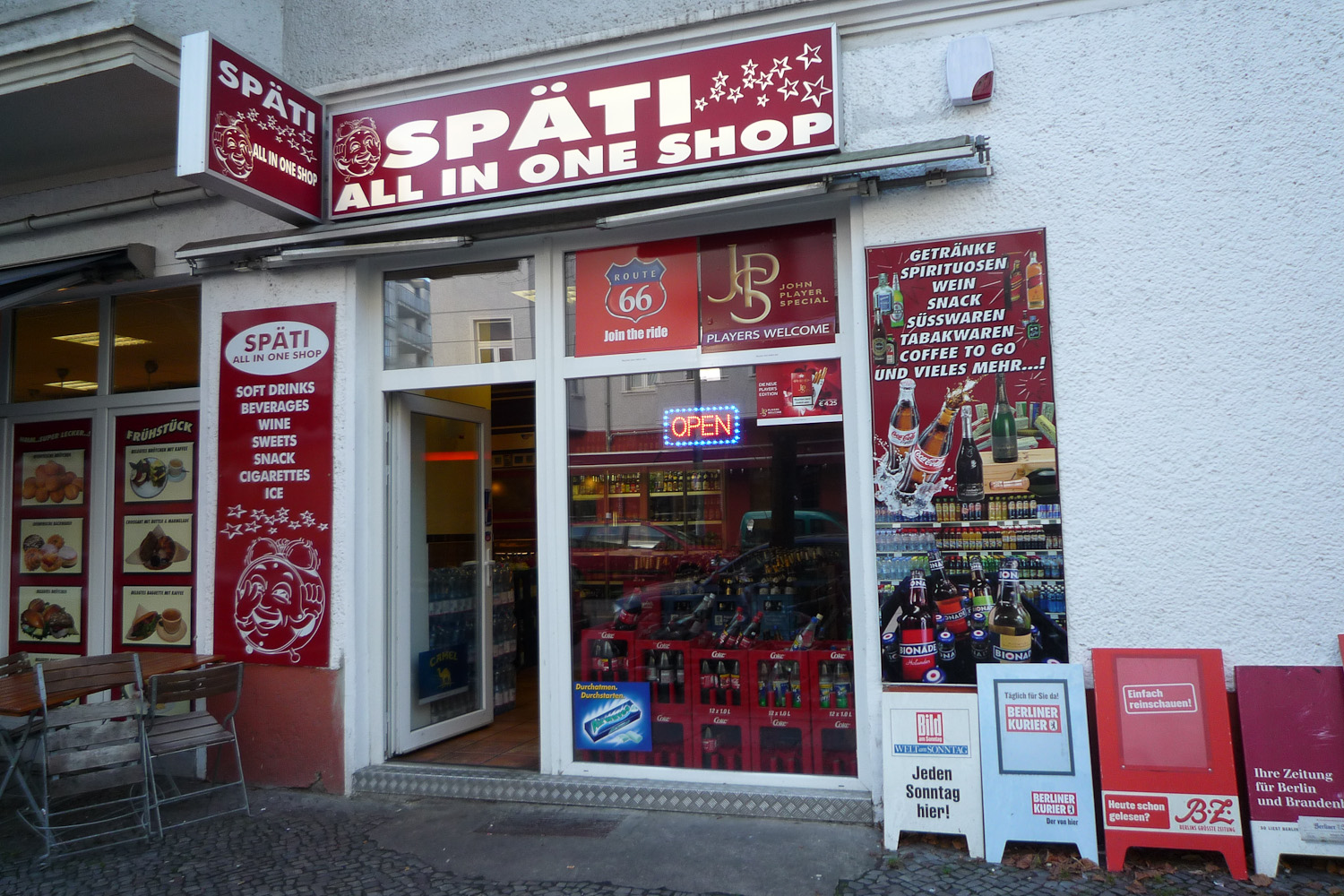

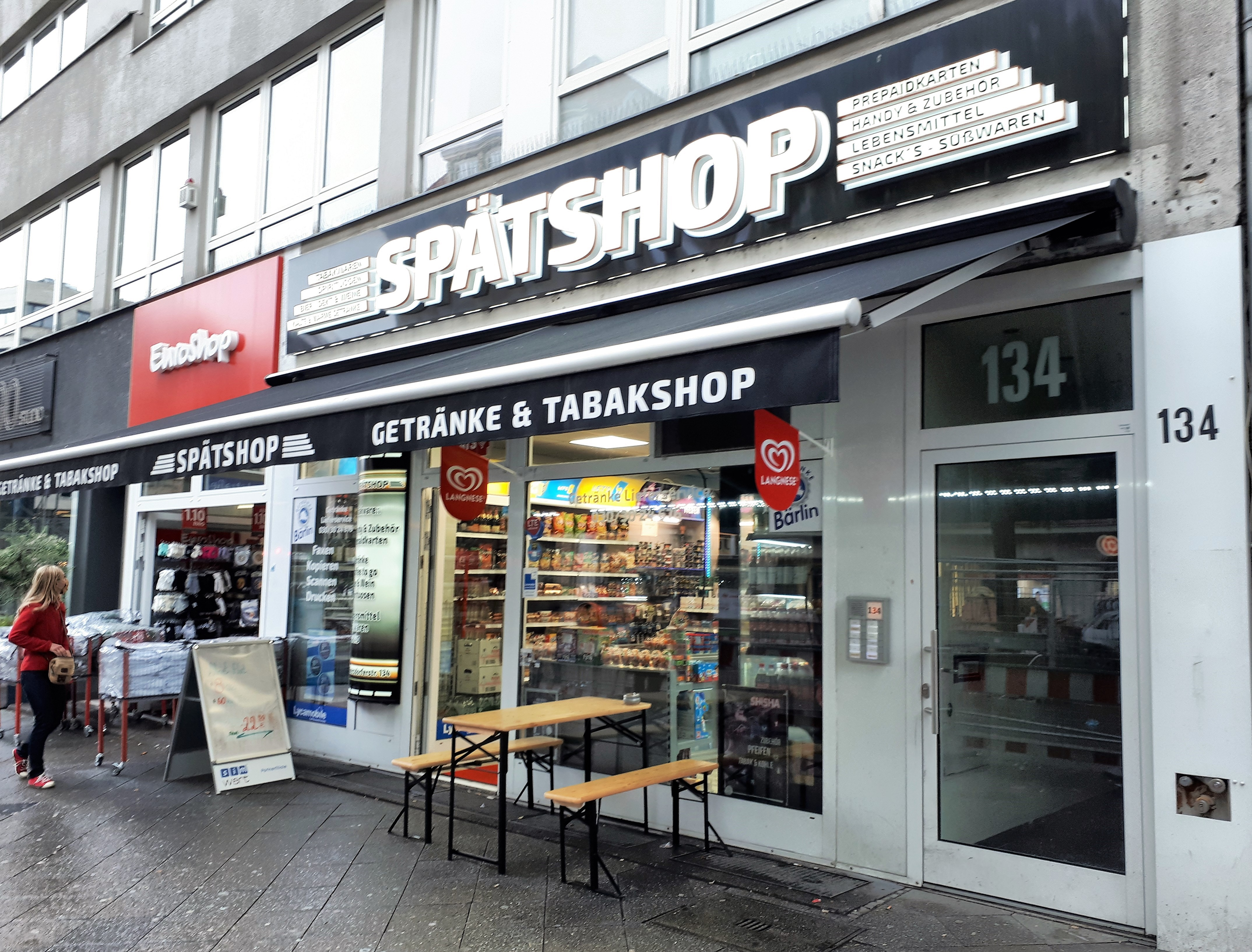

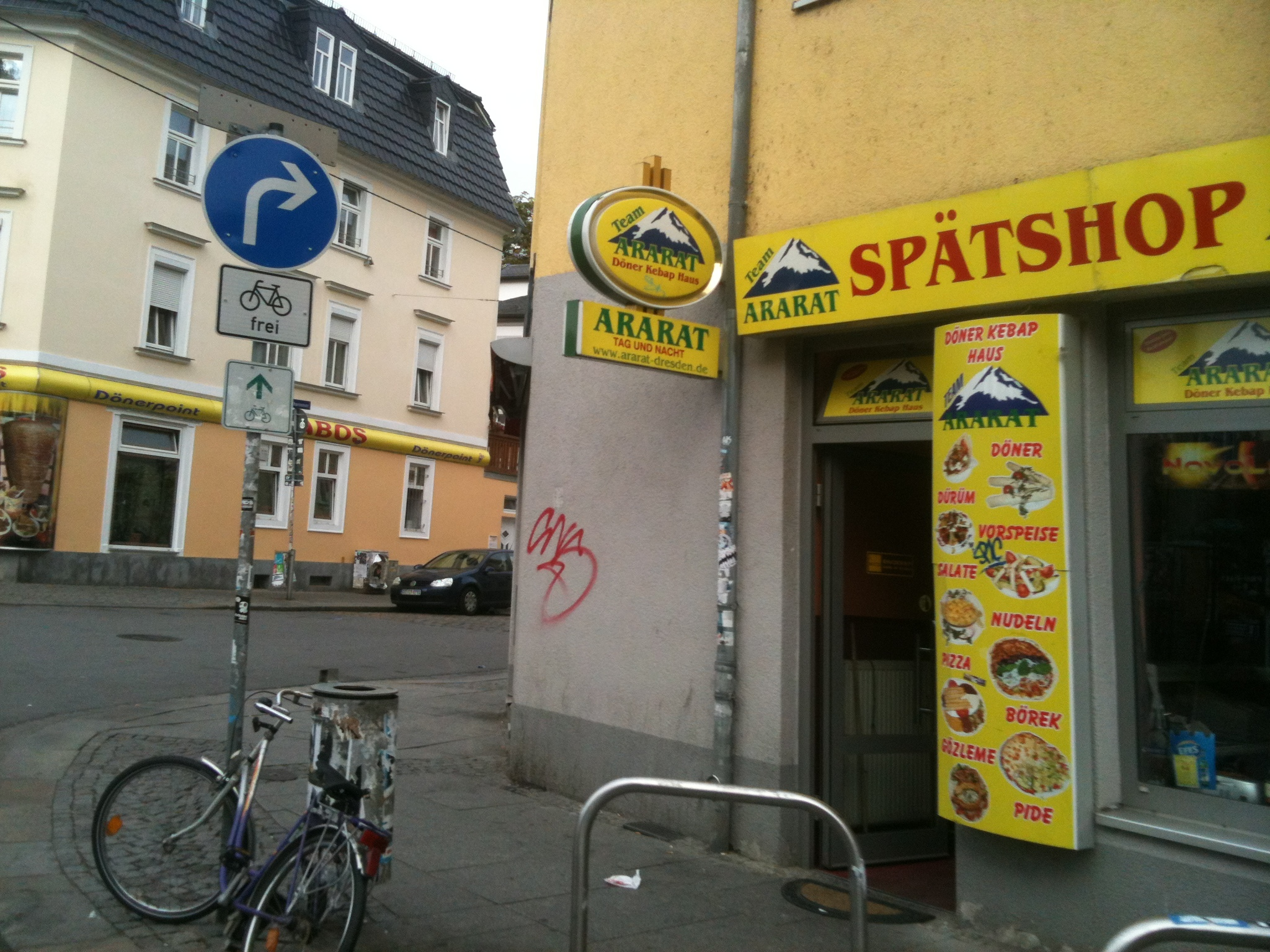

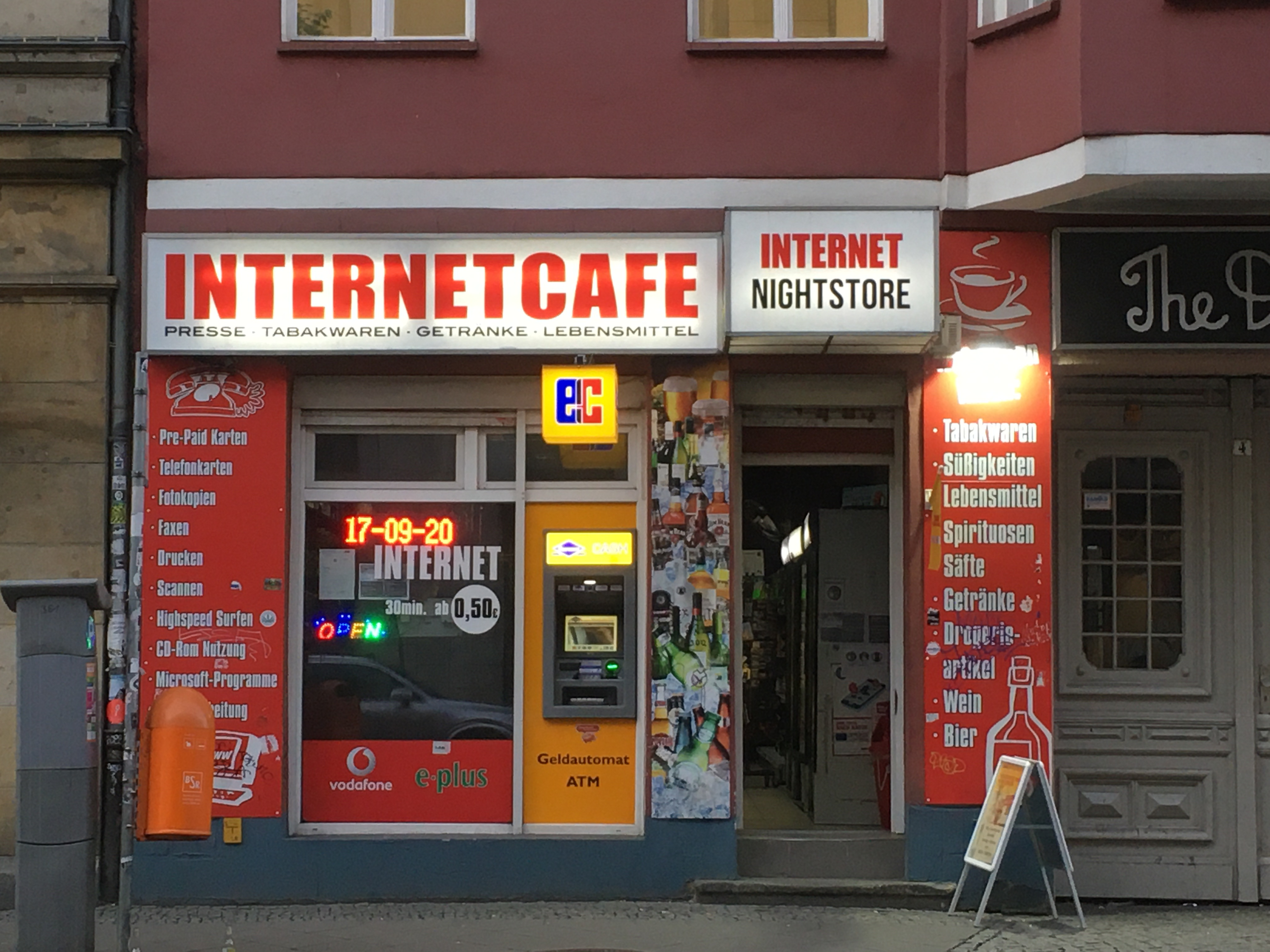

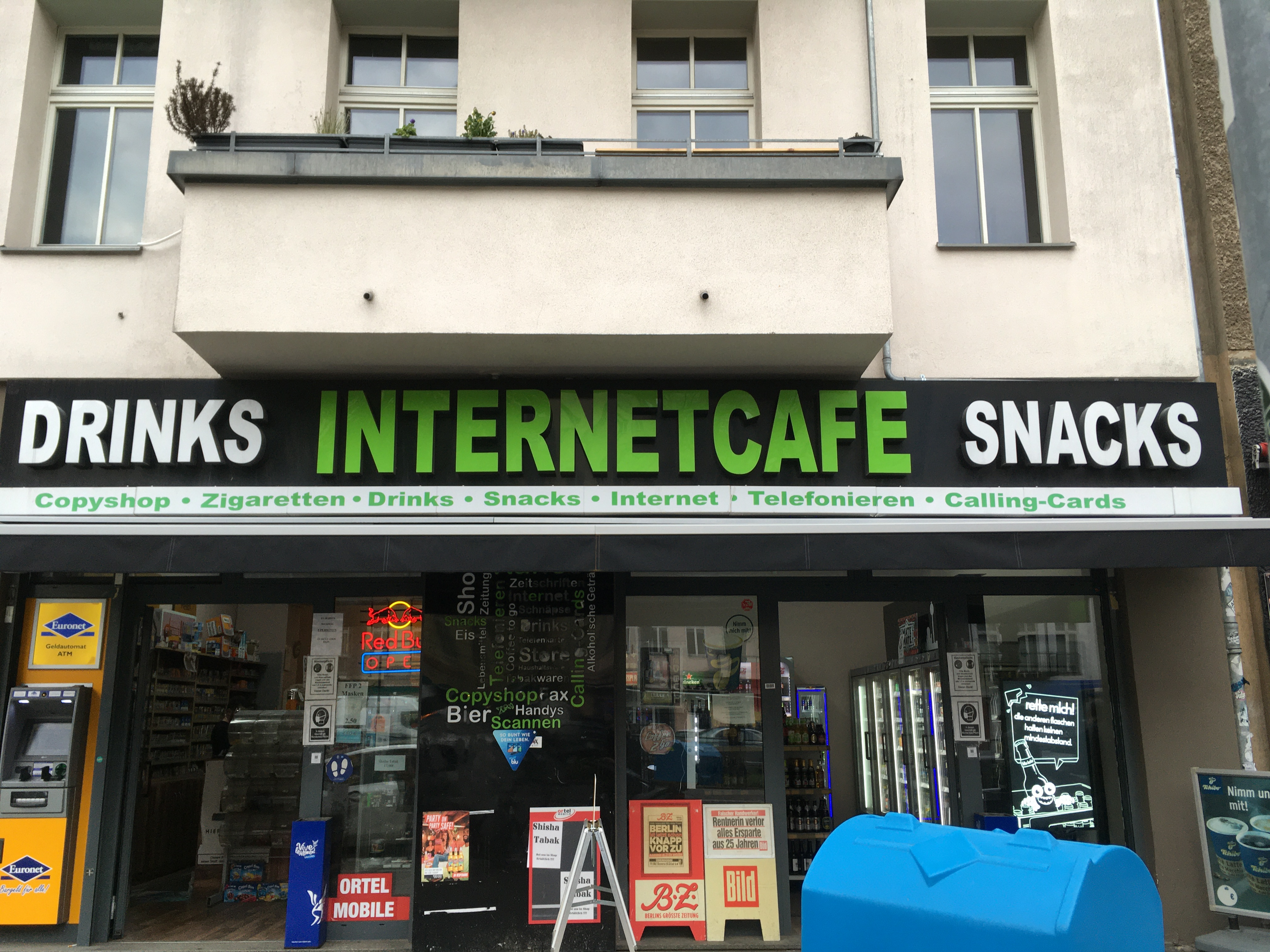

== See also ==
- Convenience store
- Superette
- Grocery store
