= Retail vehicle =

Vehicle from which retail goods are sold

Mobile shops, sales vans, shopping vans, retail vehicles, etc. are motor vehicles accommodated for small retail sales of various kind. The common types are specializing in food delivery and catering (food trucks, ice cream vans, milk floats), but in some places a more general retail is known, typically to deliver goods to remote places with difficult access to regular shops.

== Czechoslovakia, Czech Republic ==
Czech: pojízdná prodejna, lit. 'Mobile shop'

In the First Czechoslovak Republic there were mobile sellers, modified from tram cars, of tram tickets in Prague and Brno.

In Socialist Czechoslovakia, a major operator of mobile shops was the Jednota cooperative. Mobile shops operated in remote villages, as well as in seasonal recreational sites without permanent infrastructure. At the heyday, there were hundreds of mobile shops. After 1989 the operations of Jednota mobile shops nearly ceased, for various reasons, but they still operate in some areas. Under the influence of other countries food trucks started operating, albeit in other way around: brinning fresh farm produce into the sities.

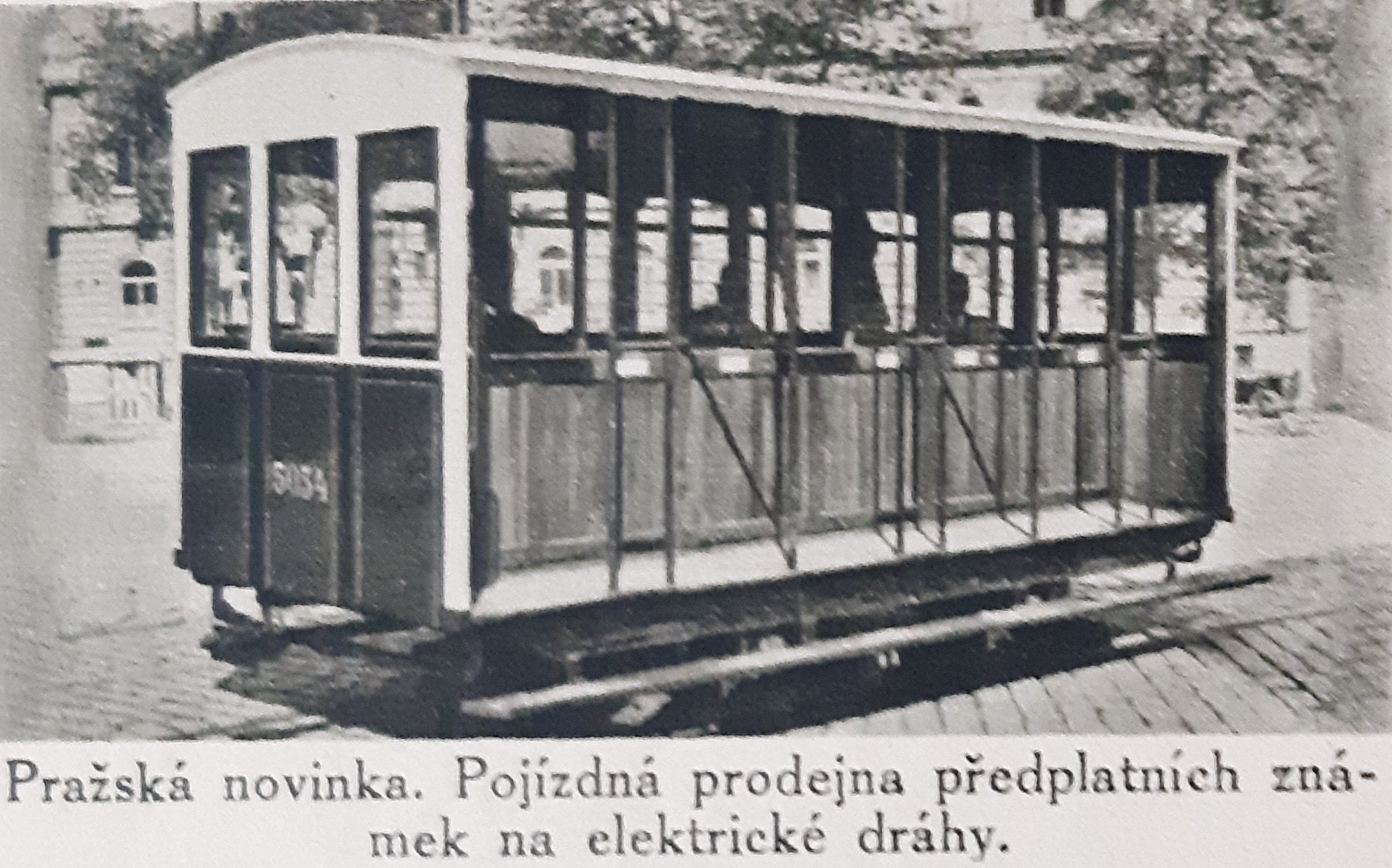
Mobile ticket office, Prague 1928

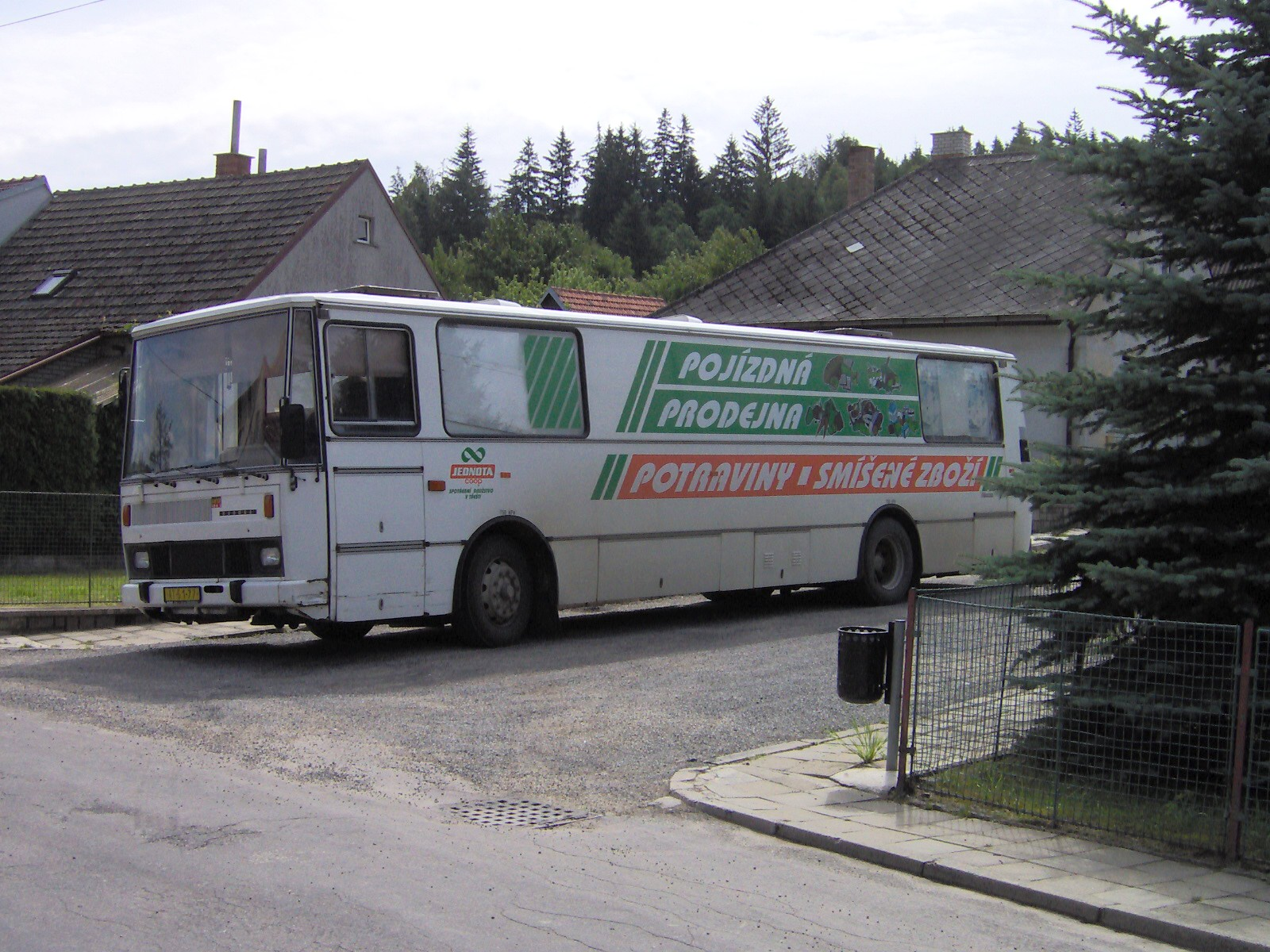
Mobile shop of the cooperative Jednota

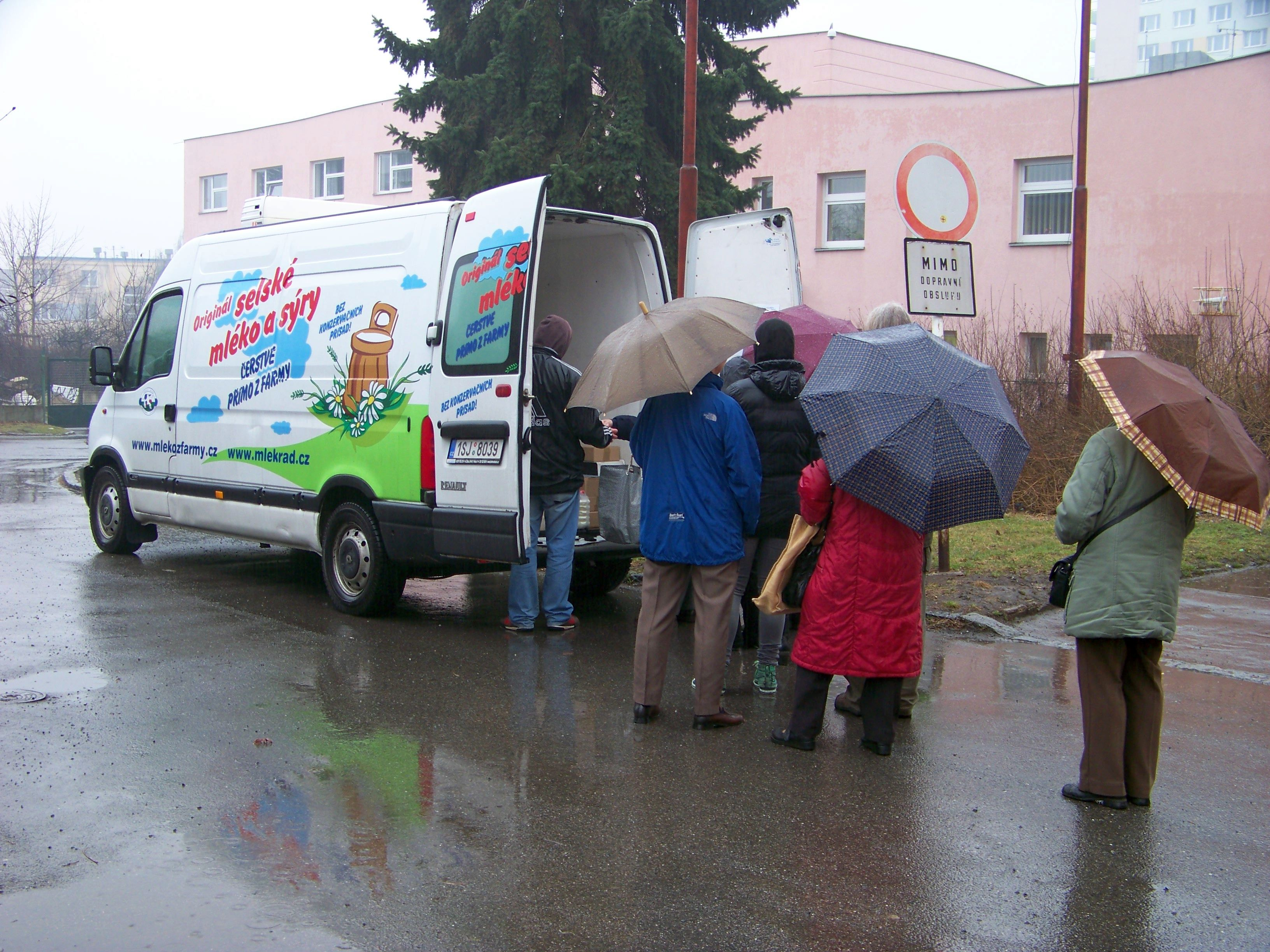
Milk float, Prague, 2011

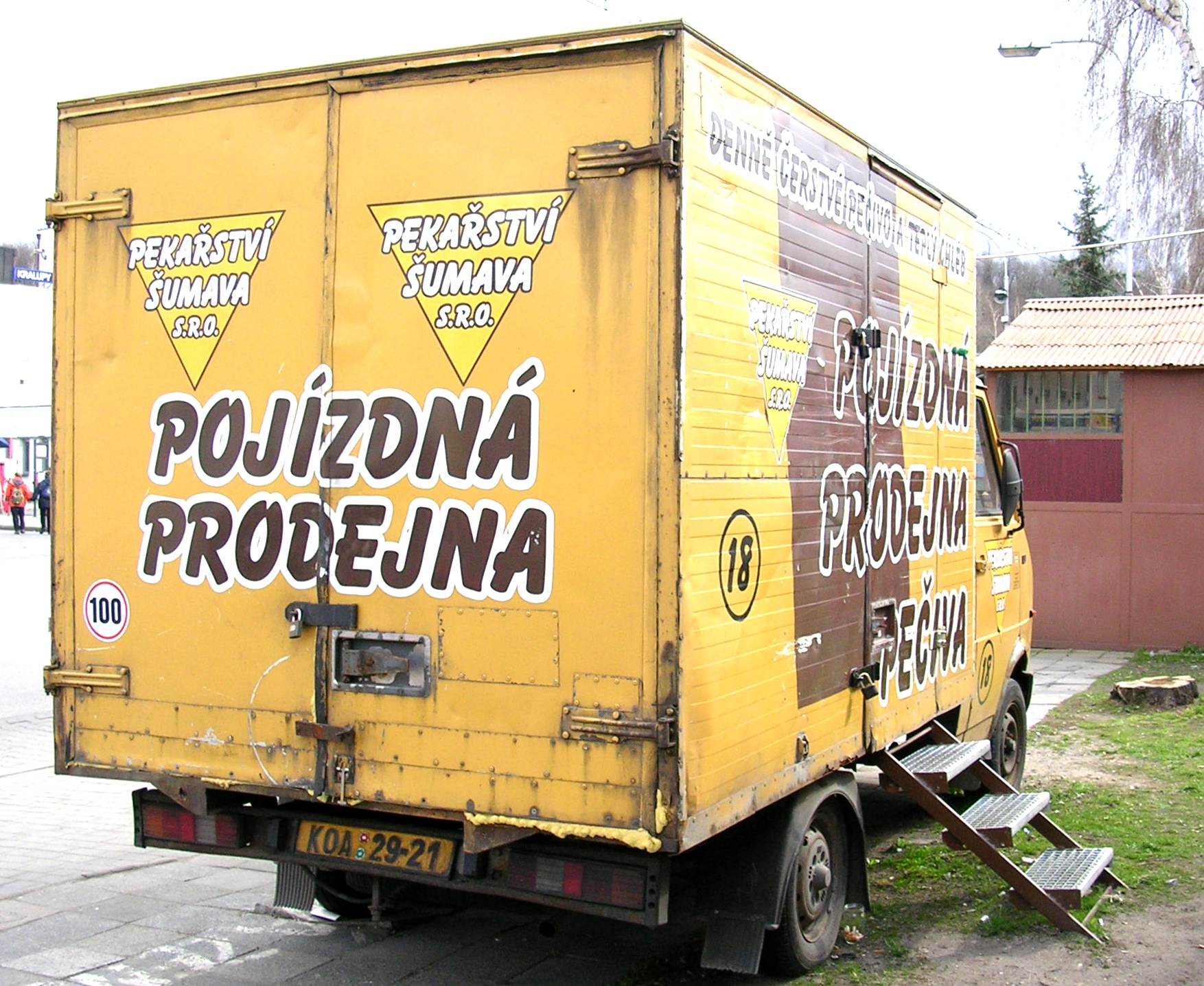
Mobile bakery vendor
- Media related to Retail vehicles in the Czech Republic at Wikimedia Commons

== Germany ==
German: Verkaufswagen, lit. 'Retail vehicle, sales van'

In East Germany the Konsum cooperative network operated sales vans in remote rural areas with difficult access to industrial goods. Their major state-owned competitor, Handelsorganisation operated Verkaufswagen as well.

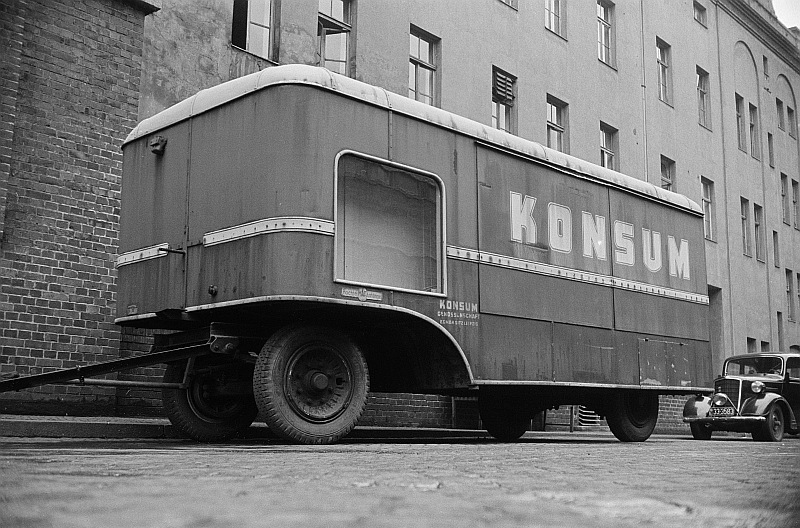
A Konsum sales van, Leipzig, East Germany, 1952

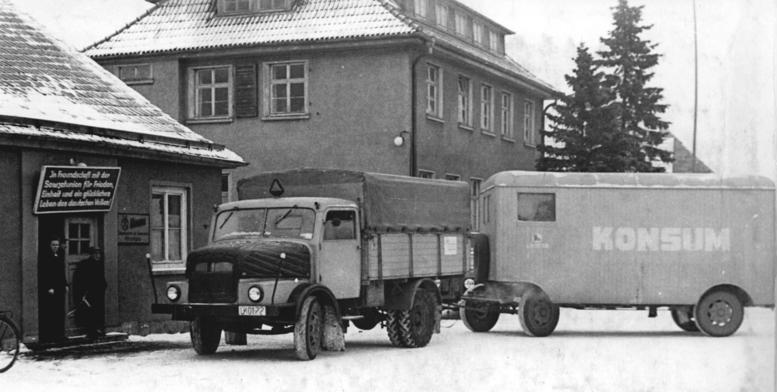
A sales van of Gotha Konsum, 1956 (Note: "Fliegende Verkaufsstelle" ( "Mobile Sales Outlet"), a sales van with a trailer of Gotha Konsum by the VEB Gothania rubber factory in the remote Hörselgau village, 1956. The pre-packed shelves are moved from the sales van to a sales area, with a good range of industrial goods. Since the arrival of the van was scheduled 88 days in advance, there was always a large crowd awaiting.)

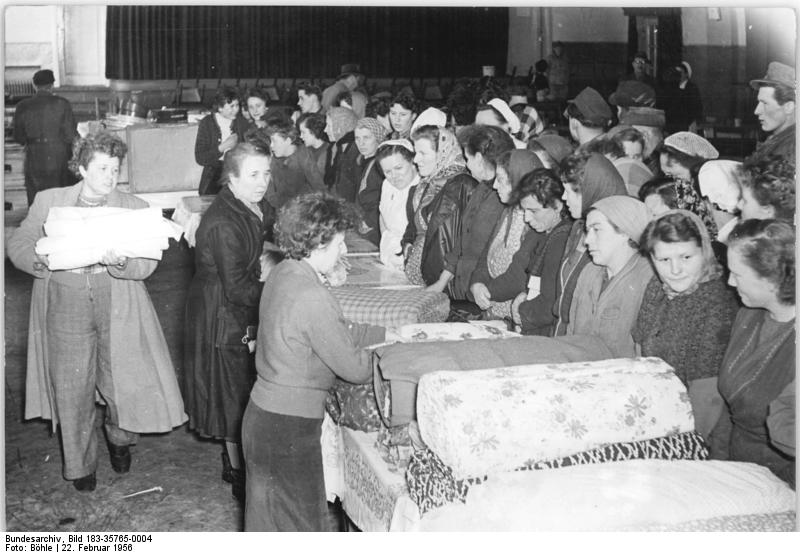
Temporary sales area for the sales van

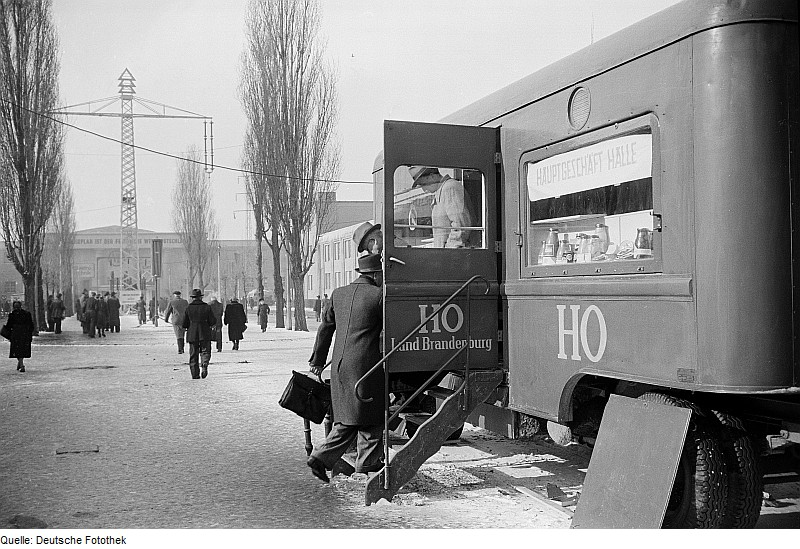
A sales van of Leipzig Handelsorganisation, 1951

== Soviet Union and post-Soviet states ==
The Lutsk Automobile Plant (LuAZ) in the Soviet Union (now in Ukraine) manufactured three types of retail vehicles: trailer shop LuMZ-825 прицеп-лавка ЛуМЗ-825 avtolavka LuMZ-827 автолавка ЛуМЗ-827 based on the chassis of GAZ-51A, with a single access to the body from the back; it can also pull the trailer LuMZ-825, and avtolavka LuAZ-3720 (ЛуAЗ-3720)

=== Russia, Belarus, Ukraine ===
Russian: автолавка, romanized: avtolavka etymology: avtomobil + лавка (smal shop).
Russian: автомагазин, romanized: avtomagazin, lit. 'mobile shop'
Russian: передвижной киоск, romanized: peredvizhnoy kiosk, lit. 'mobile kiosk'

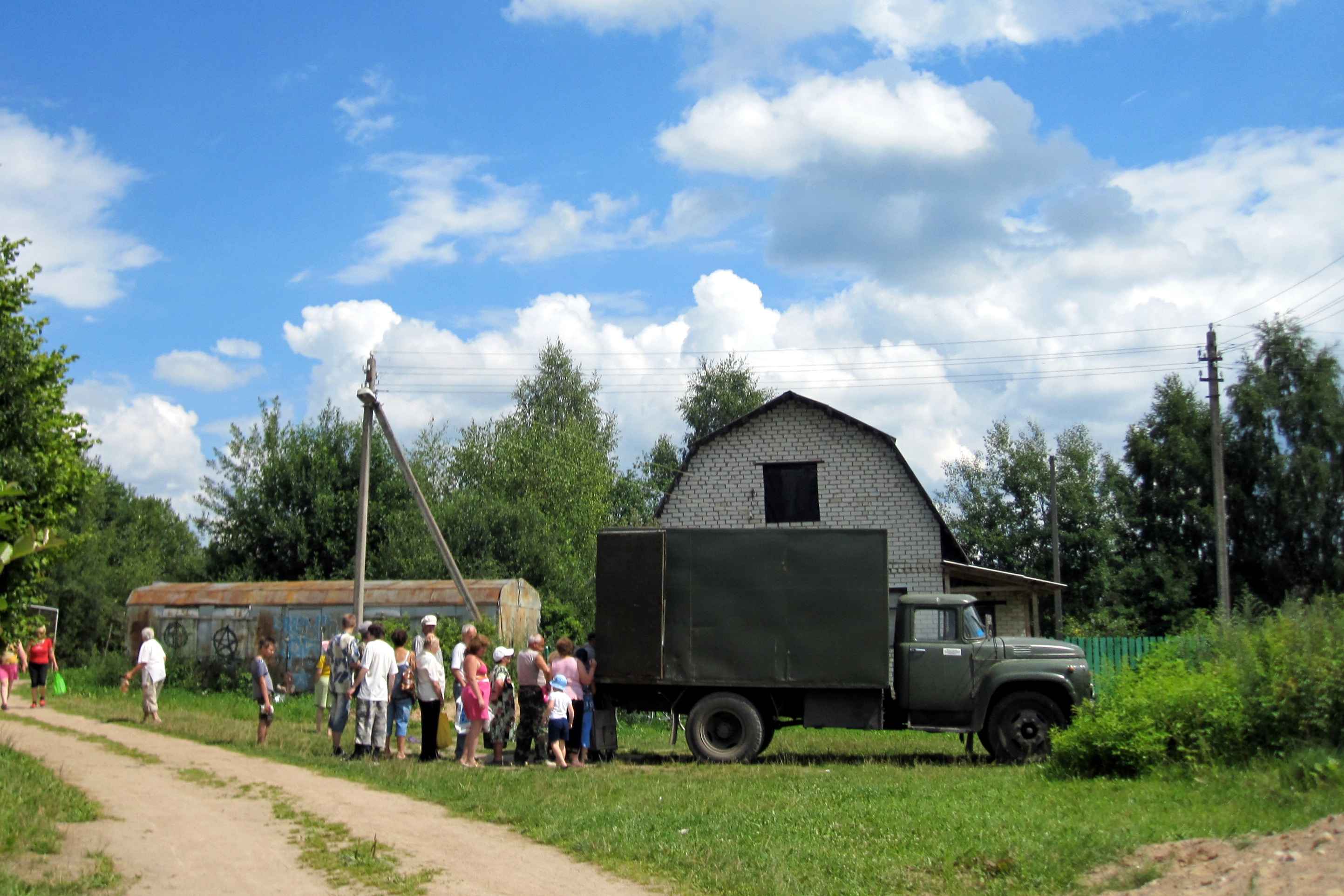
Avtolavka in Belarus

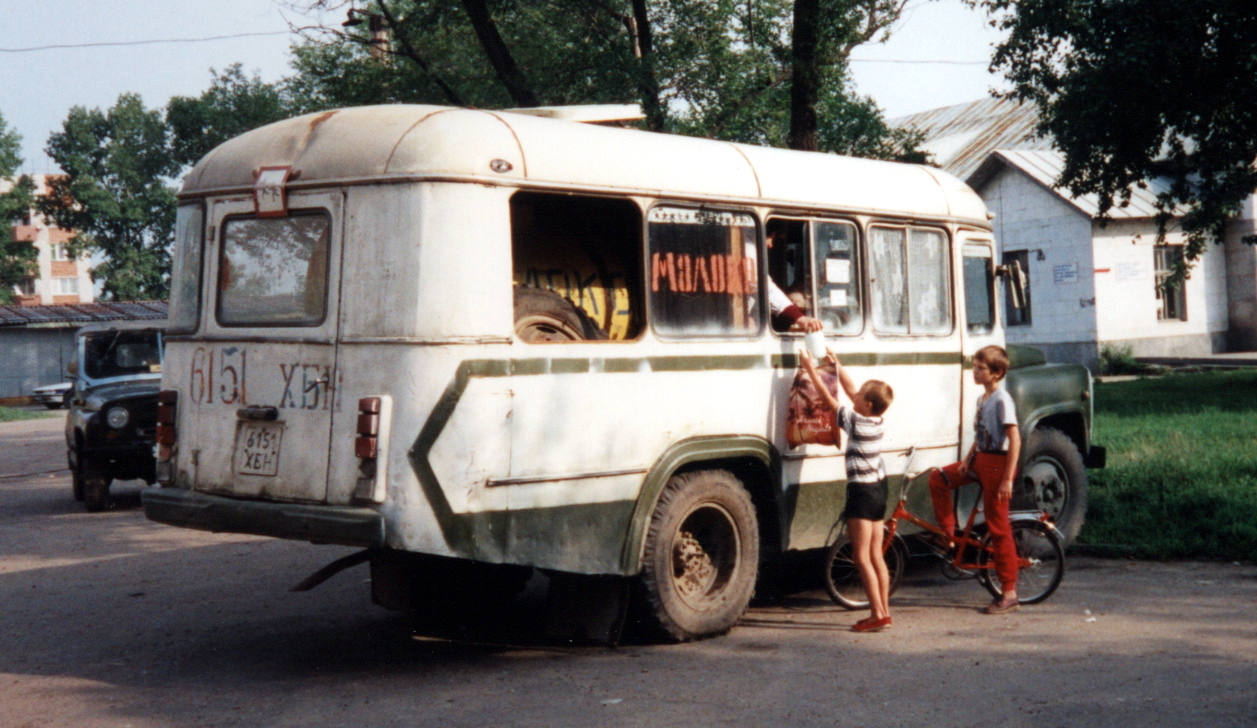
Mobile milk kiosk, Russia, 1998

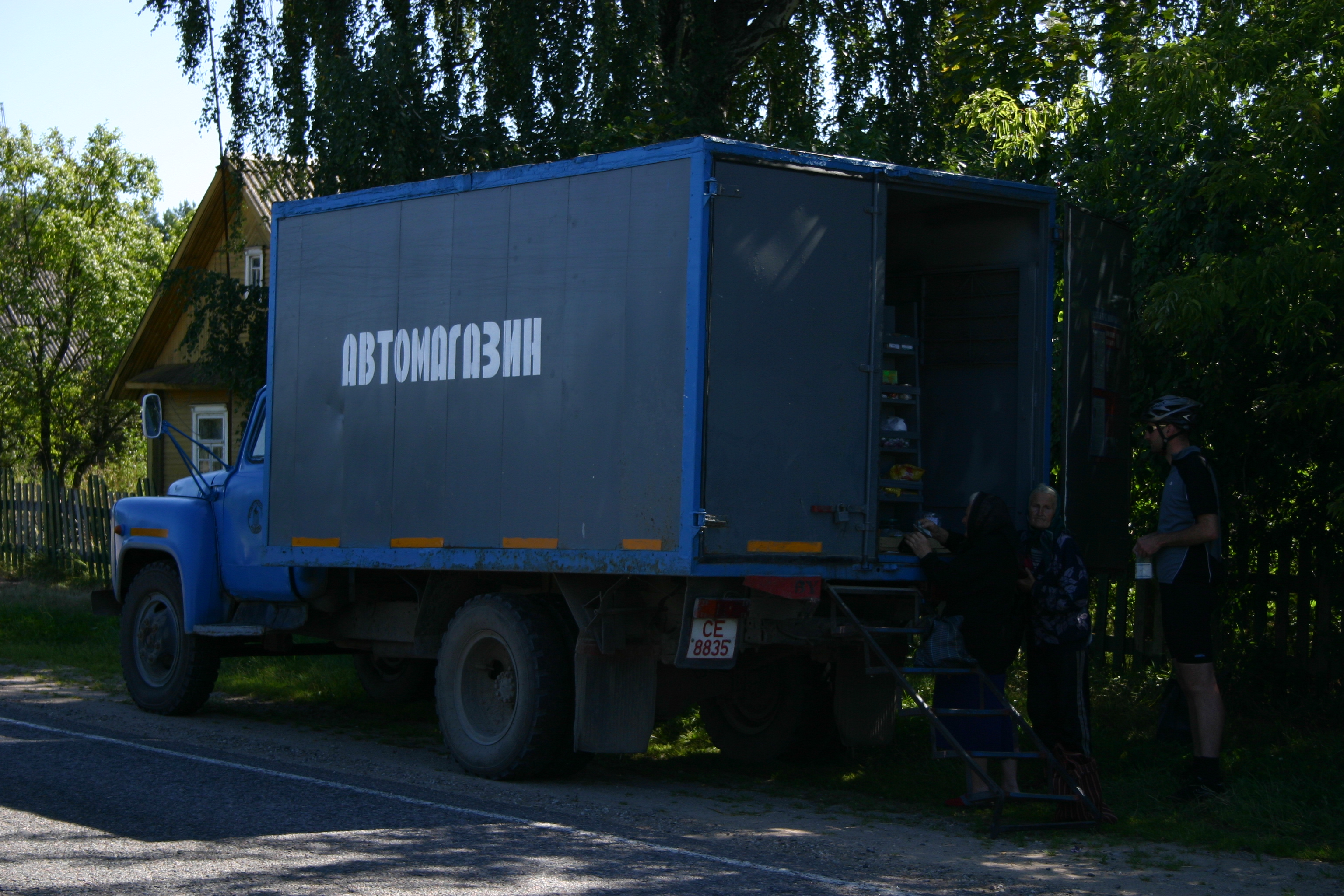
Mobile shop based on GAZ-53, Ukraine, 2009

=== Estonia ===
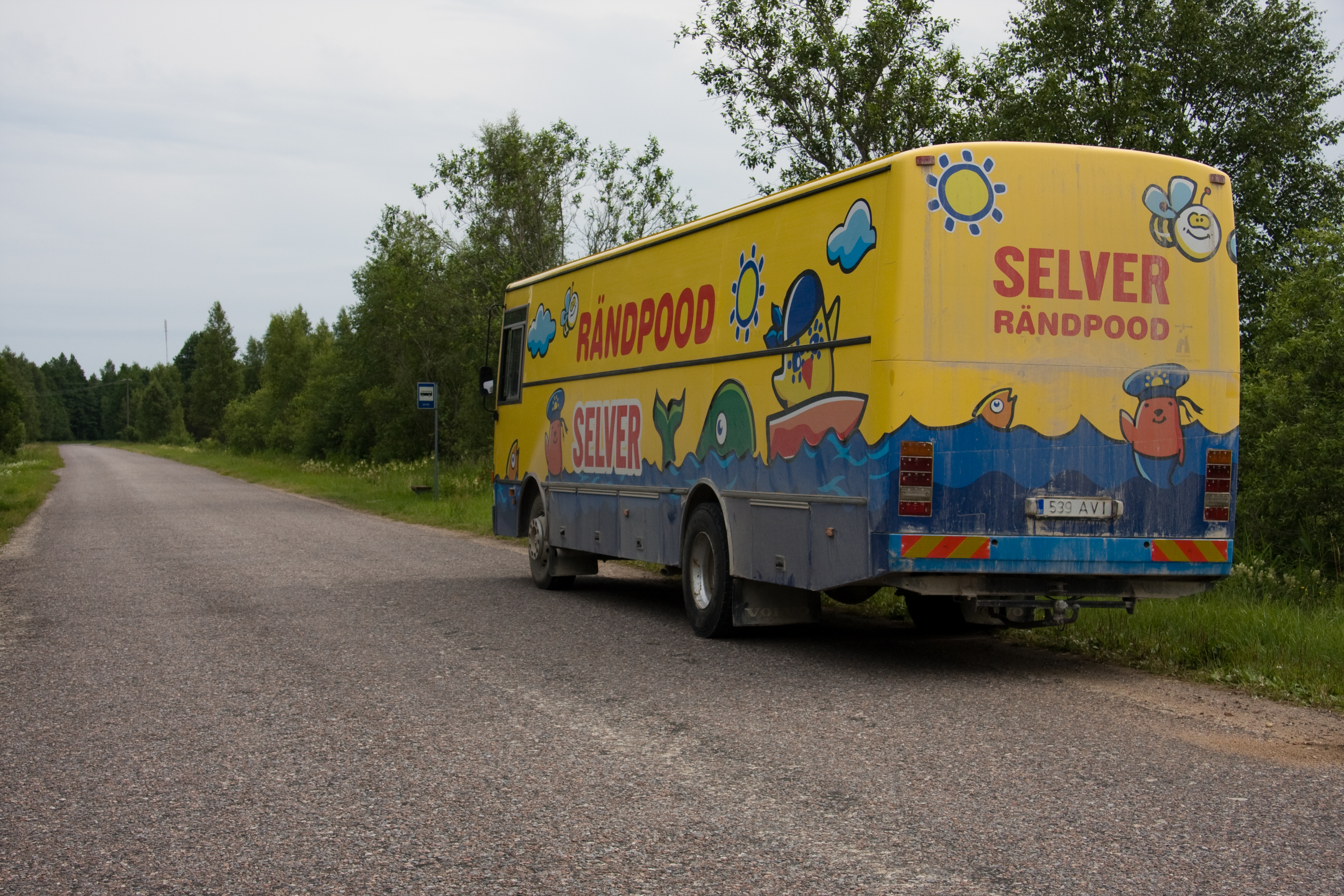
Selver's mobile shop

Estonian: rändkauplus, lit. 'mobile shop]'; synonyms: rändpood, kauplusauto, poebuss, autokauplus, also "avtolavka", "lahvka" - colloquial, borrowed from Russian, mixed etymology: lavkabuss

A mobile shop is defined as "a vehicle adapted as a mobile point of sale, mainly selling food and basic necessities".

In the Soviet Estonia avtolavkas were managed by the unified Estonian Republican Union of Consumer Cooperatives (now Coop Eesti).

In 2015, a family-owned business Lasteriided Ratastel (literally "Children's clothes on wheels") started operating mobile shop for children's clothing and shoes.

The Consumers' Association of the island of Hiiumaa operated a retail vehicle purchased in Finland since 1994. In 2017 a new retail vehicle will be operated by Hiiumaa division of Selver brand.

== Finland ==
Finnish: myymäläauto, kauppa-auto

The first mobile shops were introduced by the Elanto cooperative in early 1930s. It the 1950s, at their peak time, there were about 1,200 shop vans. Gradually their numbers dwindled. In 2014 there were about 30 of them.In 2018, only six mobile shops left. Five of them operate in the rural areas of Eastern Finland and one in the Kankaanpää region. A detailed study of Finnish mobile shops may be found in Jussi Lehtonen's Ph.D. thesis Scenarios of services in the countryside: shops, libraries, banks and post offices of the past, present and future

In 2014, the Estonian Road Museum received a Finnish retail vehicle which was also operated by Estonian business Tilsico OÜ for five years.

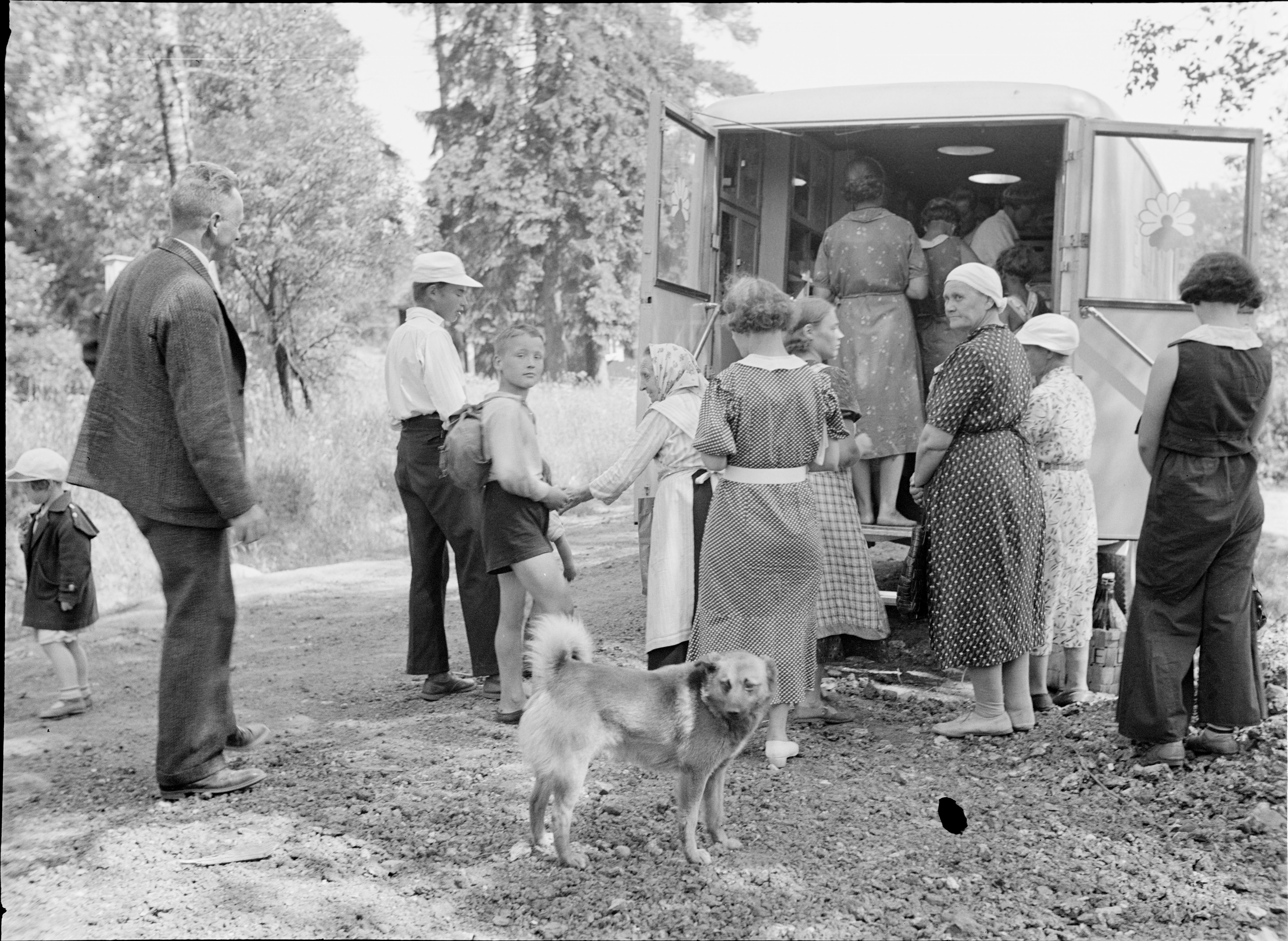
Elanto cooperative mobile shop, 1930s

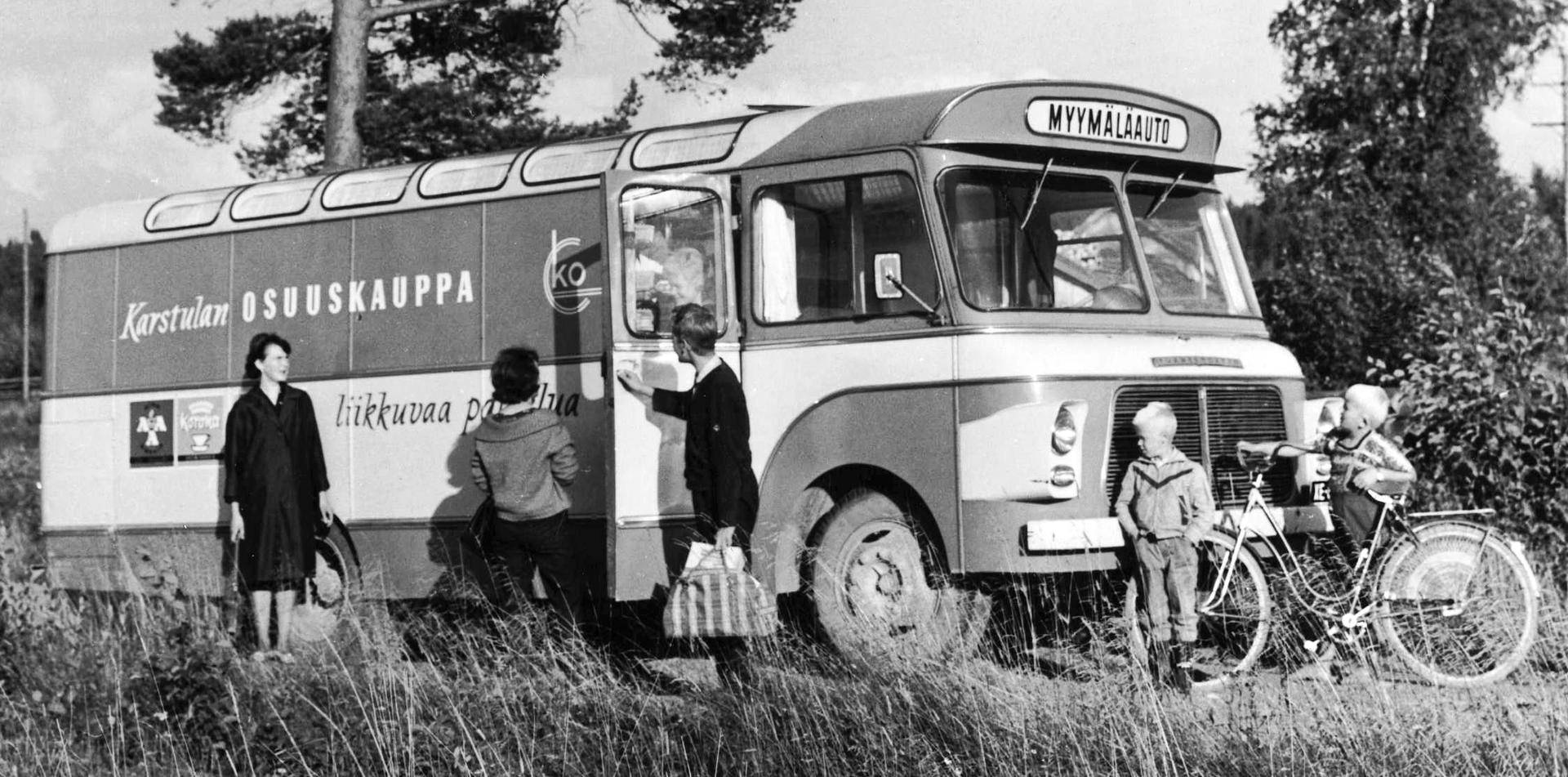
Retail vehicle of the regional cooprative in Karstula, 1970

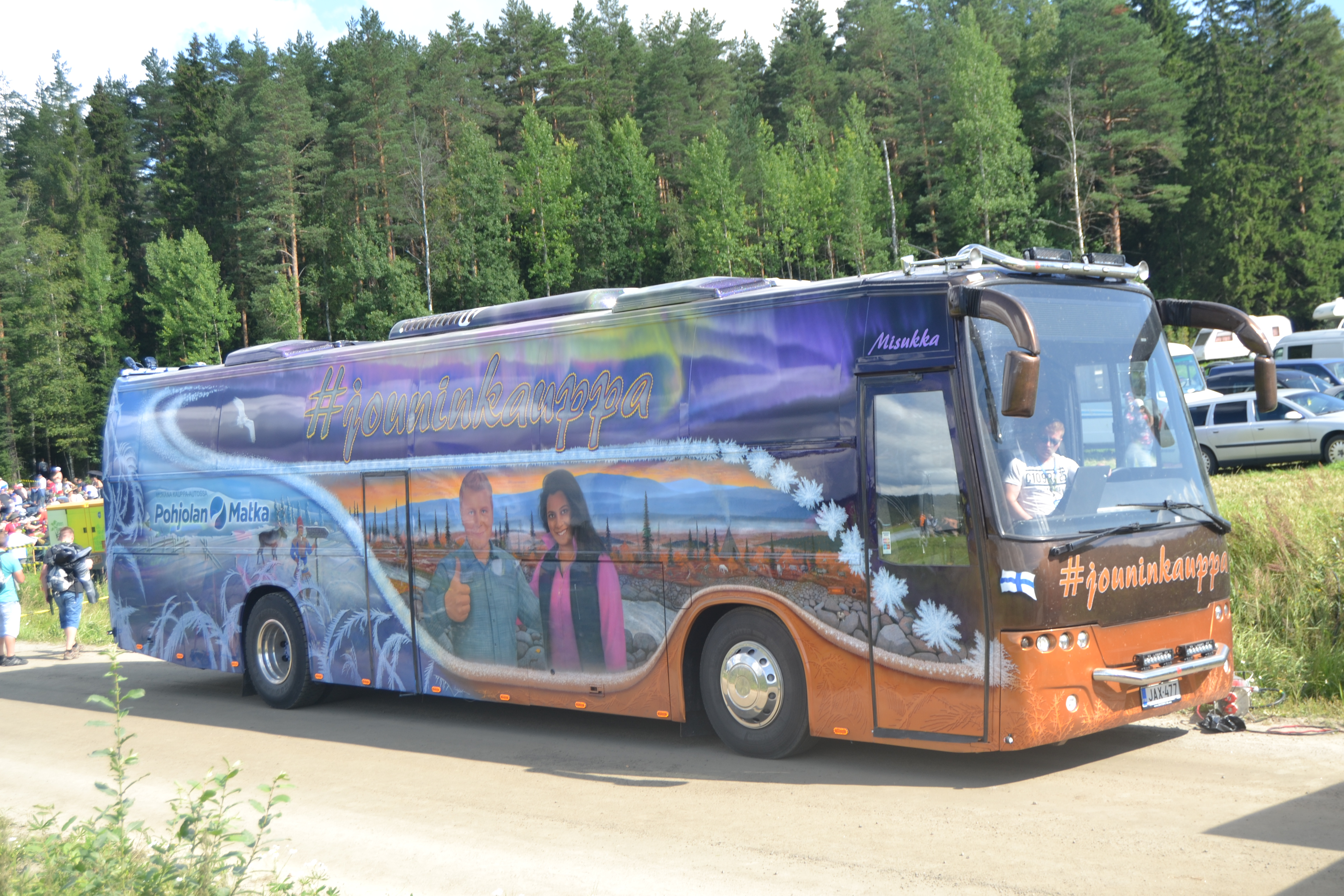
Jounin Kauppa mobile shop, 2016

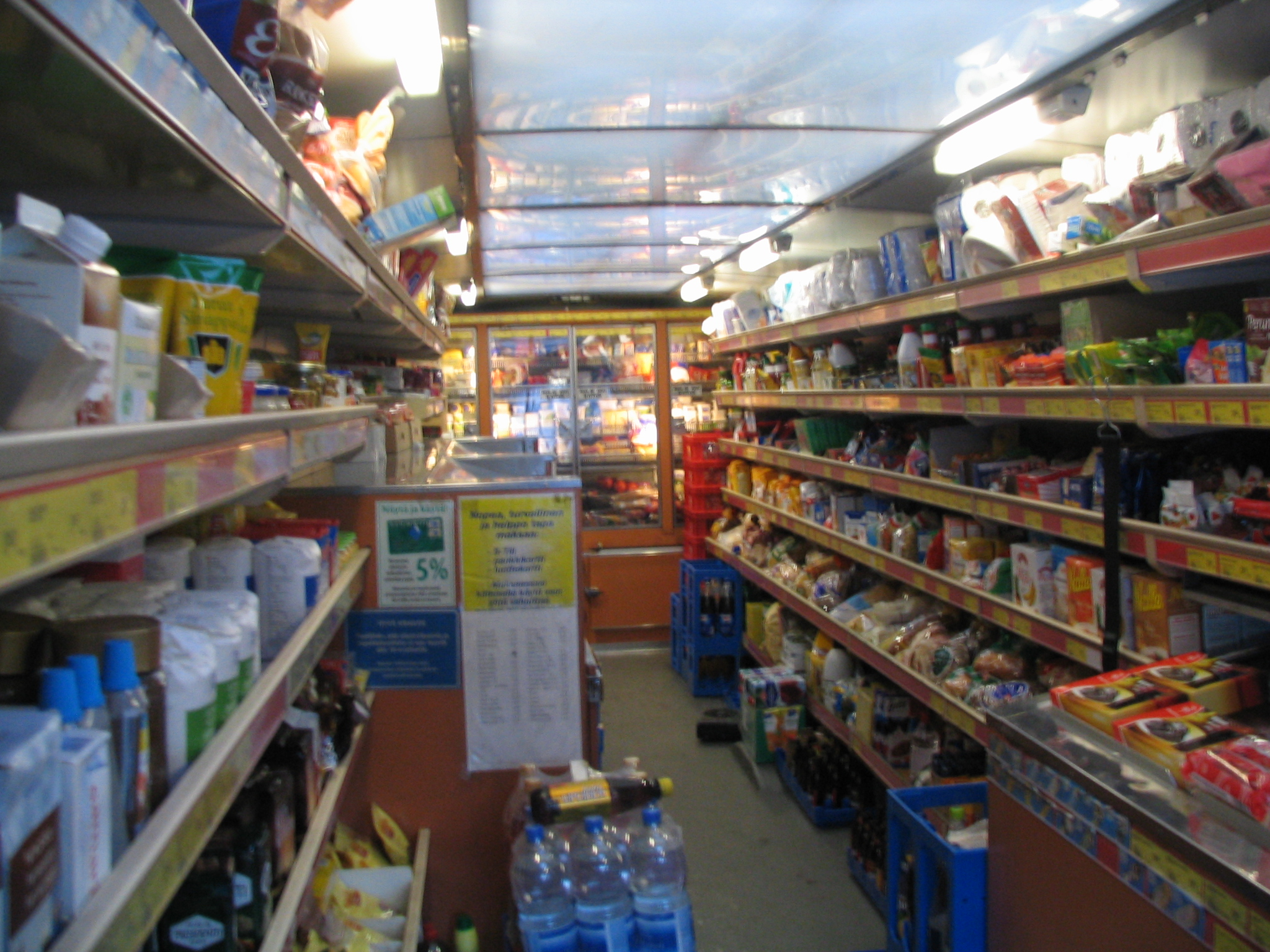
Inside a A Mukkalan Kauppa Oy mobile shop, 2021

== Switzerland ==
French: Camions magasin, lit. 'truck shop, van shop'
German: Verkaufswagen, lit. 'Retail vehicle, sales van'

The Migros retail company was founded in 1925 with the idea of truck delivery (based on Ford Model T trucks) of six basic products at low prices to householders who did not have ready access to markets of any kind. In 1960s, their operations peaked, with 144 trucks in operation. The operations gradually declined, especially in 1990s, due to the competition from the chain stores and the improved customers' mobility.

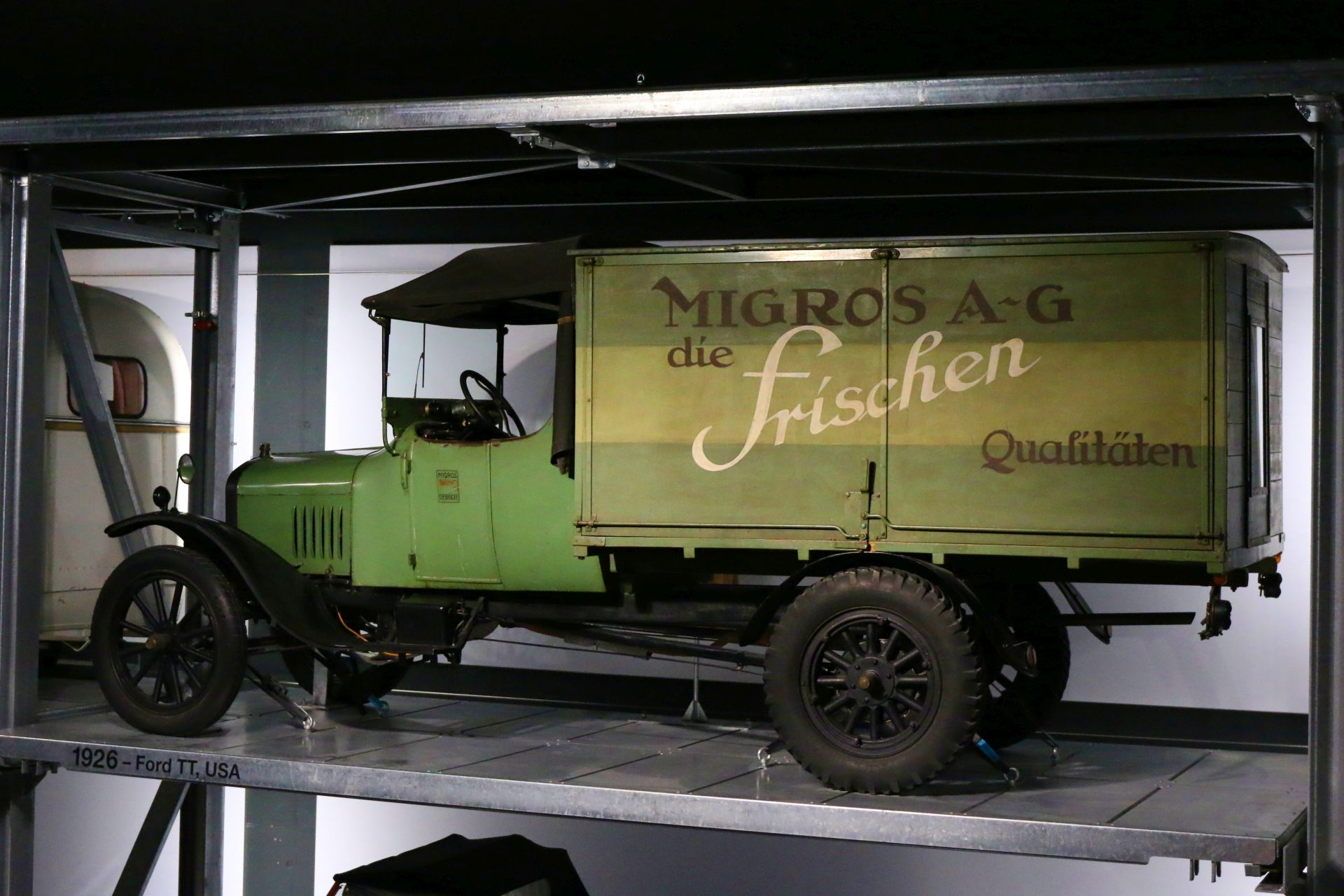
A Migros Ford Model TT from 1926

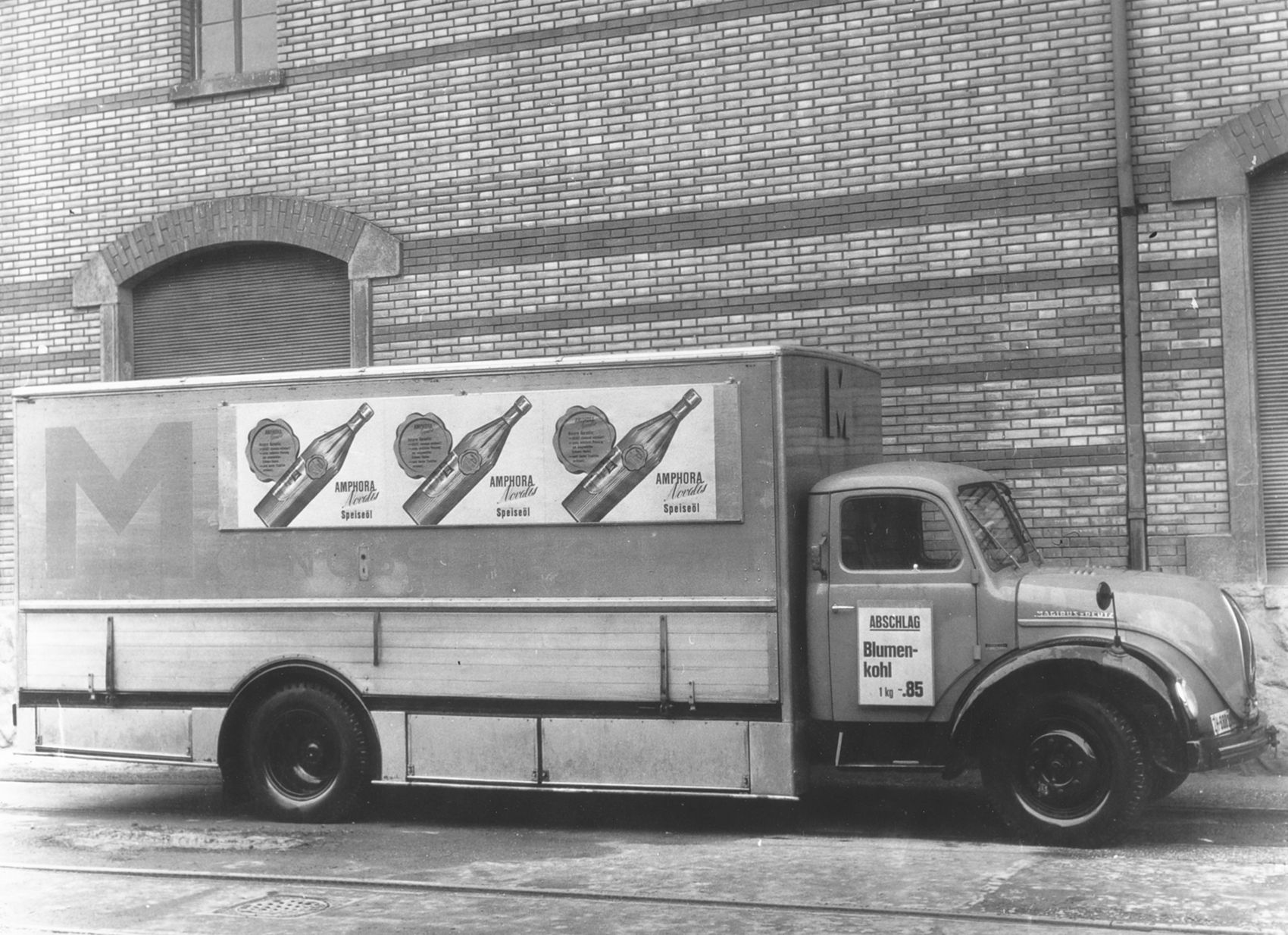
A Migros sales vehicle from 1956

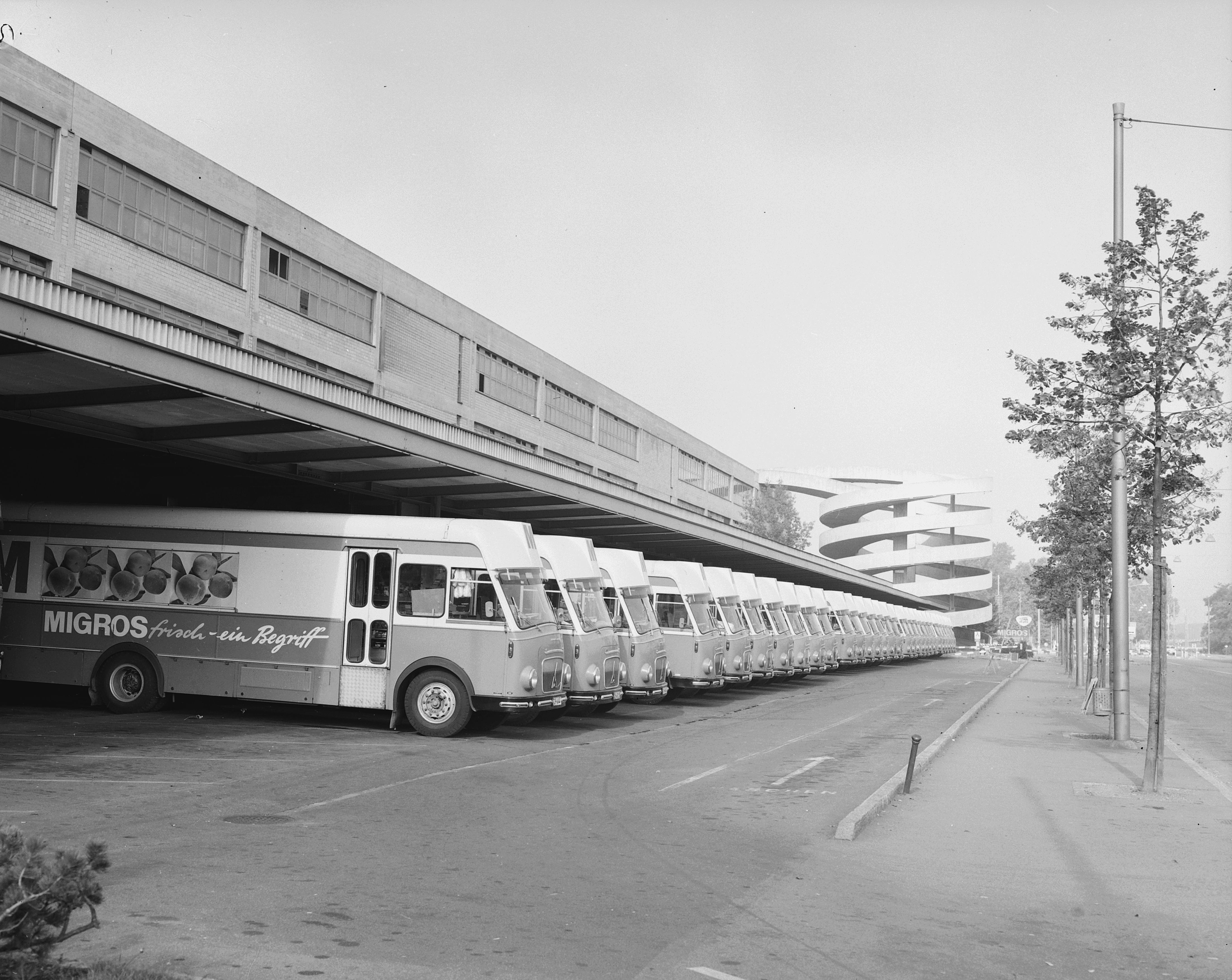
A Migros Magirus-Deutz-based sales vehicles, 1971

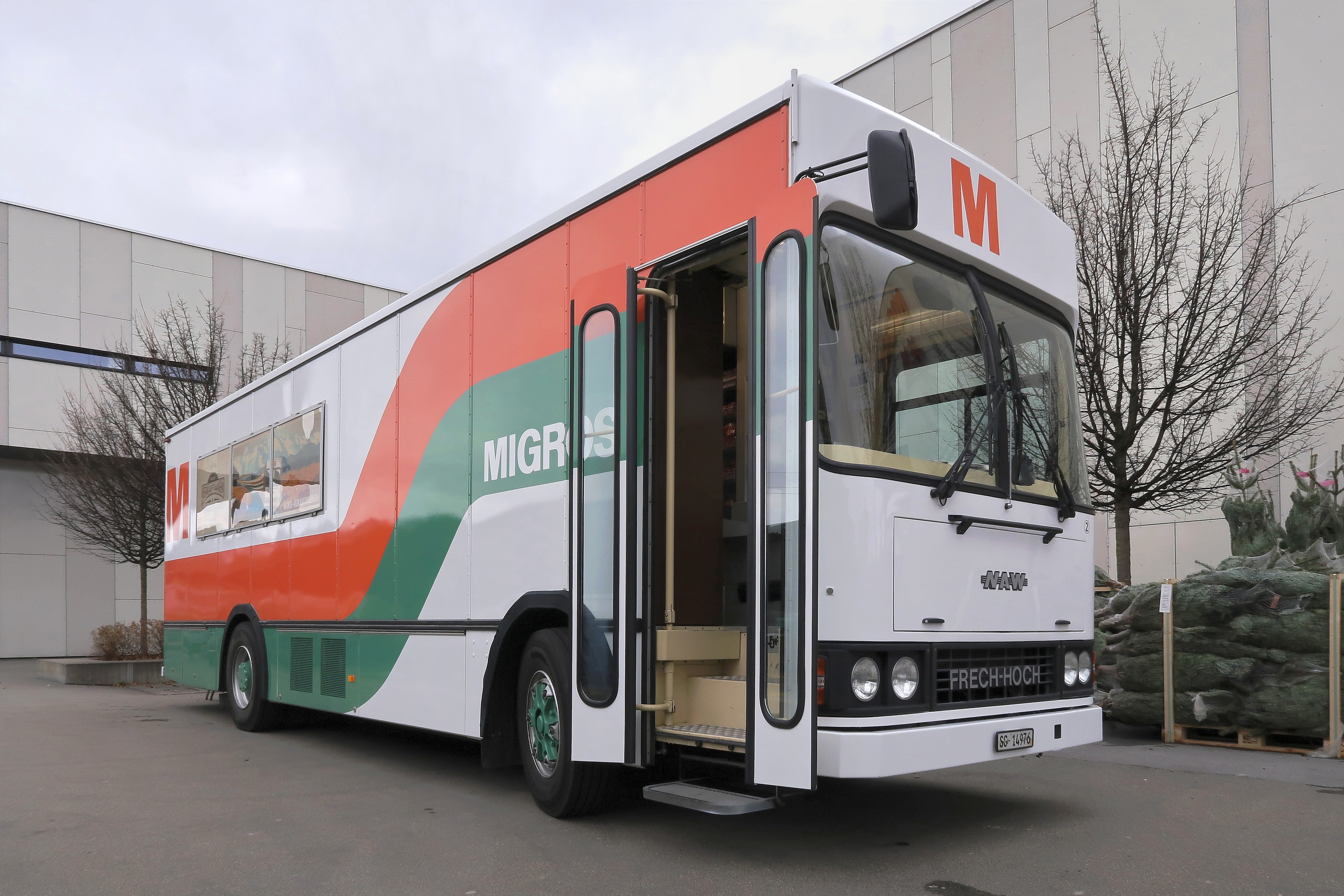
A Migros sales van

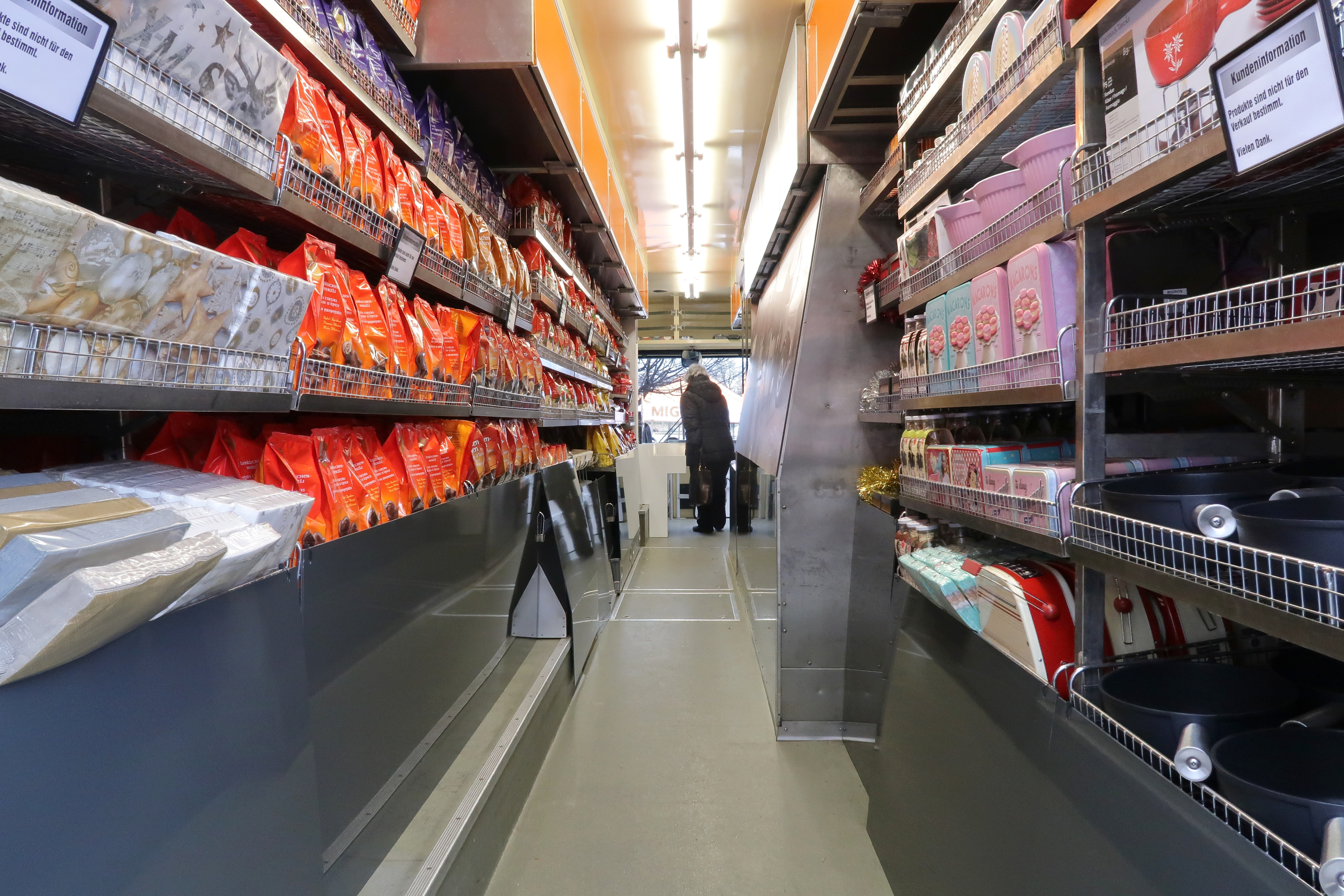
Inside a Migros sales van

Media related to Migros vehicles at Wikimedia Commons

== See also ==
- Bookmobile
