= Konsum =

Konsum is a name used by several consumer cooperatives, including:

- Coop Konsum, a retired brand of Kooperativa Förbundet in Sweden
- Konsum, a state-controlled retailer in the former German Democratic Republic
- Konsum Österreich, a former retail co-operative and part-owner of BAWAG in Austria
