= Bodega =

Type of small convenience store in New York City

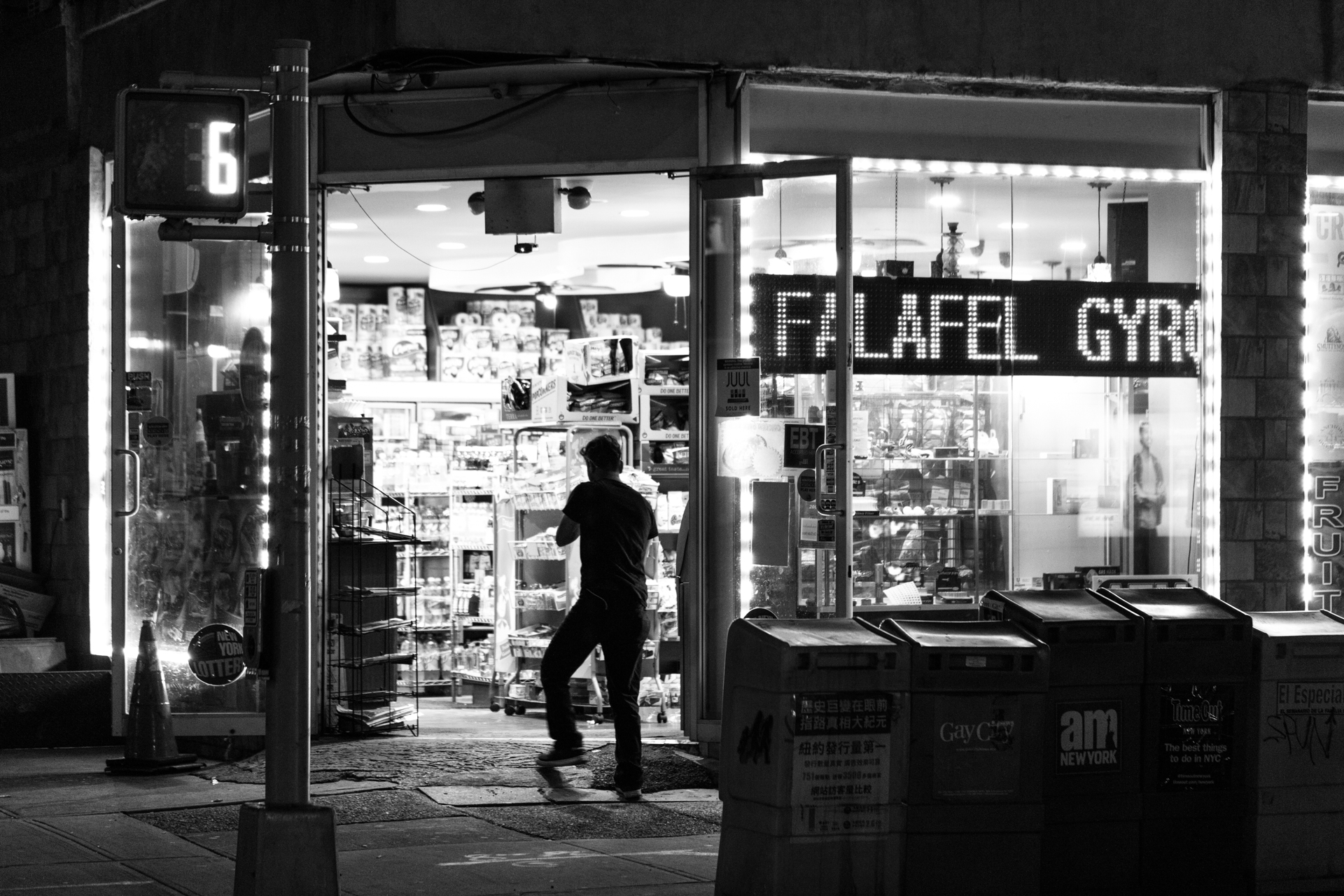
A man walks into a corner bodega late at night.

A bodega /boʊˈdeɪɡə/ is a small owner-operated convenience store serving hot and prepared food, often open late hours and typically with ethnic market influences. The New York City Department of Health defines a bodega as any store of sufficient size "that sells milk, meat, or eggs but is not a specialty store (bakery, butcher, chocolate shop, etc.) and doesn't have more than two cash registers". Most famously located on New York City's street corners and associated with immigrant communities as well as the Puerto Rican community, they are romanticized for their convivial culture and colorful character. As of 2020, there were an estimated 13,000 bodegas across New York City.

== Etymology ==
In Spanish, bodega is a term for "storeroom" or "wine cellar", or "warehouse", with a similar origin to the words "boutique" and "apothecary"; the precise meaning varies regionally in the Spanish language, and the later New York City term evolved from the Puerto Rican and Cuban usage for "small grocery". In contemporary Cuba, the term now usually connotes a government ration store. In the Romanian language, bodega is a term for "dive bar".

In English, the first printed appearance of the bodega dates to a travelogue of Spain from 1846, describing wine cellars. The Sun reported the first bodega opening in New York City in 1902; it was described as a Spanish "barroom", more like a cantina. The more specific meaning of a type of New York City Puerto Rican convenience-store only came about in the mid-20th century, with the first print appearance in Time in 1956; though the term has also been applied retrospectively to such establishments as far back as the 1920s.

The New York City "bodega" resembles, and may overlap with, a delicatessen, newsstand, corner store, corner grocery store, or candy store.

== Food and health ==
The Atlantic notes that "the bodega business model lends itself to selling non-perishable foods that are often unhealthy." In 2005, the New York City Department of Health launched a Healthy Bodegas Initiative to assist bodegas in stocking healthier food. Nonetheless, bodega-reliant areas such as the Bronx—which had 25 bodegas for every supermarket as of 2019—continue to be assessed as food deserts.

In 2026, Mayor Zohran Mamdani proposed opening a city-run grocery store in East Harlem with plans to open by 2029. The plan, which was one of Mamdani's campaign promises, has been criticized by many bodega owners as potentially unfairly competing with bodegas. In response, Mamdani argued that bodegas and city-run stores would not compete on all products, noting that "for bodegas, some of the primary revenue generators are tobacco products and lottery products" which would not be sold by city-run stores.

== History ==
New York City's bodegas were popularized in the mid-twentieth century by Puerto Ricans. Some stores were named after places in Puerto Rico. Although they were initially documented in the 1930s—a 50th anniversary was marked on Spanish-language radio station WADO in 1986—the first bodega may have opened even earlier. Early examples were establishments serving factory workers in Greenpoint, Brooklyn, and La Marqueta in East Harlem, where stalls serving Puerto Rican staples (at first included among goods sold by local Jewish merchants) became increasingly Puerto-Rican-owned in the 1920s and 1930s. Other Latino groups in the city have also embraced the bodega, serving a wider variety of Latin American cuisine. Centro de Estudios Puertorriqueños at Hunter College owns a collection of historical bodega photography. Despite their Hispanic origins, by the late 2010s approximately half of all New York bodegas were operated by Yemeni American immigrants. Yemeni business owners led a campaign of bodega closures in February 2017 in protest of Executive Order 13769, a travel ban enacted by US President Donald Trump.

== Bodegas in popular culture ==
One famous bodega, Gem Spa, was a gathering place for beat poets in New York's Greenwich Village in the 1960s. Gem Spa is also thought by some to be the birthplace of the egg cream.

Lin-Manuel Miranda's 2005 musical In the Heights centers on the character of Usnavi, the owner of a local bodega in Washington Heights, Manhattan.

The Bronx has experienced a notable increase in stores and bookshops highlighting local cultural identity. For example, Bronx Native and its "Bodega Dreams" collection intentionally celebrate and preserve these community roots.

== See also ==
- Bodega cat
- Dairy (New Zealand)
- Halal cart
- Delicatessen
- Asian supermarket
- Milk bar
- Spaza (shop)
- Toko (shop)
- Botánica
- Spätkauf
- Kobini

== Bibliography ==
- Janer, Zilkia; Albala, Ken (2008). Latino food culture. Food cultures in America / Ken Albala, general ed. Westport, Conn.: Greenwood Press. ISBN 978-0-313-34027-7.
- Fuster, Melissa (2021). Caribeños at the table: how migration, health, and race intersect in New York City. Chapel Hill (N.C.): The University of North Carolina press. ISBN 978-1-4696-6456-9.
- Meltzer, Rachel; Schuetz, Jenny (2012). "Bodegas or Bagel Shops? Neighborhood Differences in Retail and Household Services". Economic Development Quarterly. 26 (1): 73–94. doi:10.1177/0891242411430328. ISSN 0891-2424.
