= Gem Spa (Basquiat) =

1982 painting by Jean-Michel Basquiat

Untitled (Gem Spa)
- Artist: Jean-Michel Basquiat
- Year: 1982
- Medium: Acrylic on canvas
- Dimensions: 183 cm × 143 cm (72 in × 56 in)
- Owner: Private collection

Untitled (Gem Spa) is a 1982 painting created by American artist Jean-Michel Basquiat in 1982. It is an autobiographical work depicting a sparsely rendered figure atop a bicycle "drowned in darkness."

== Background ==
In early 1980, Basquiat abandoned his prolific downtown graffiti pseudonym SAMO in order to embrace his career as a painter. In retrospect, he stated, "I wrote SAMO IS DEAD all over the place. And I started painting." Untitled (Gem Spa) was produced in 1982 during an important turning point in his career. Basquiat stated, "I had some money; I made the best paintings ever,'' referencing his work from this early highpoint.

The figure in the painting is surrounded by arrangement of symbols and words such as "tar," "asphalt," "motor area," "Gem Spa," and "have teeth," whose partially obscured presence give the painting "a particular depth." The viewer encounters the newly born radiant child escaping the destiny faced by a black American born in Brooklyn, breaking free from the confines of the social determinism, and posthumously finding a place among the most acclaimed, sought after, and expensive artists. However, he never escaped the disillusionment experienced after losing his mother to involuntary treatment resulting from her attempted suicide. Despite several attempts at sobriety, he never outran his addiction and ultimately succumbed to heroin. In the article "The Radiant Child", published 1981 in Artforum, the art critic Rene Ricard states, "We are that radiant child and have spent our lives defending that little baby, constructing an adult around it to protect it from the unlisted signals of forces we have no control over."

== Analysis ==
"This childish character, drawn with an incisive line, thus reveals a self-portrait of a particular depth....This heavy referent to poverty and wandering belongs fully to the year 1982, since it will be the visceral year when the artist will change his signature, definitively. SAMO then becomes Jean-Michel Basquiat....making this work more than a portrait: an autobiography," analyzed art blogger Alain Truong.

=== The Use of Black ===
Basquiat's work is often praised for its vibrant color, however the use of black is of equal importance. "Those granted a visit to his studio in 1984 did not recognize the painting they had admired two days earlier: the complex and elaborate imagery was now drowned in darkness. 'I scratch out and erase, but never so much that they don't know what was there before. This is my version of repentance', said Basquiat.'" In an interview with Howard Stern, Madonna recalled, "When I broke up with him he made me give [the paintings he gave me] back to him. And then he painted over them black." "He paints on canvas like he graffitis the walls: by covering the surface…again and again. An earlier work also appears as a watermark on this canvas, revealing the imprint of sacrificed words”, as remarked by Alain Truong while observing Untitled (Gem Spa).

=== The Symbolism of Words ===
==== Tar ====
Basquiat is known to have expressed that he ''sometimes felt as black as tar''. In Basquiat's work, the black substance represents the racism he experienced while growing up half Puerto Rican and half Haitian. At age 11, as part of the desegregation busing program, Basquiat was among the children transported from impoverished black neighborhoods to wealthier, predominantly white school districts. Here, he was in a clear minority and faced the racism of fellow students. Ostracized for his blackness, Basquiat reacted by confronting his heritage and simultaneously developing a unique interest in exploring his roots. In addition, tar symbolizes the depression that took his mother, Matilda, away from him. It is also the name given to a specific form of heroin. The radiant child of Untitled (Gem Spa) is surrounded by a black ground and the only bright color is within the figure. The artist has freed the character from the deep black tar in order to become the radiant child as described by Ricard.

==== Asphalt ====
"Asphalt" is a reference to the streets he often frequented at the age of 17 after being driven out of his home by his father, Gérard, for bad conduct. This asphalt also evokes his mother's attempted suicide driving into a wall with her family in the car. At the time, Basquiat was only 11 years old. As a result of this event, he was involuntarily abandoned by his beloved mother, who was interned in a psychiatric facility at age 37. The significance of asphalt has also been linked to a childhood incident in the artist's life. At age 7 he was hit by a car while playing in the street, earning him a broken arm, a long stay in the hospital, and the removal of his spleen. This asphalt also represents the call of the road described by Jack Kerouac, whom Basquiat continuously read. On the Road by Kerouac, published in 1957, became the symbol of freedom contesting bourgeois values. It is the emblem of the Beat Generation. Yet unlike Kerouac, the radiant child of Untitled (Gem Spa) does not travel by bus and motorcycle, instead it takes to the road on a kid's bike.

==== The Reference to the East Village Gem Spa ====
The words "Gem Spa" refer to the 24/7 newsstand and smoke shop of the same name that was at the center of the Beat movement in Manhattan's East Village and frequented by the likes of Jack Kerouac, Allen Ginsberg, and Andy Warhol. As a newsstand distributing marginal publications, Gem Spa was influential in disseminating the Beat movement's ideas and influencing writers of the time. Allen Ginsberg, whom Basquiat knew personally, mentions Gem Spa in one of his most famous poems, Rain-wet asphalt heat, garbage curbed cans overflowing. In 1966, The Village Voice awarded Gem Spa the name "official oasis of the East Village". By this time it had also become known as the "hippie hangout". Ginsberg called this shop the "nerve center" of the city. Gem Spa retained its influential status throughout the 1970s and 1980s, spreading both the psychedelic and punk culture of New York. The store appears on the very first punk album in history by the New York Dolls, whom Basquiat knew and appreciated. Basquiat created dense work that played a role in the advent of punk visual art. Gem Spa was located at 36 St Marks Place on the corner of 2nd Avenue. It was open 24/7 and became a meeting point for the marginalized, night owls, and was at the center of the places frequented by Basquiat in 1982. Basquiat exhibited his first works at gallery 51X, located at 51 St Marks Place, next to Gem Spa.

==== Motor Area ====
Basquiat's trademark crown is not present in this picture. Instead the viewer sees the words “Motor Area” on the figure's forehead. “Motor Area” alludes to the function of the motor cortex described in the book Gray's Anatomy that the artist received from his mother during his hospitalization after being hit by a car at age 7. In this book, Henry Gray defines the motor area as the part of the brain coordinating the execution of voluntary motor movement.

==== Hobo Signs ====
The painting features five arrows pointing in the same direction, forward. Two of them are parallel, encircled by the handlebars and the figure's arms. Henry Dreyfuss' book highlights this specific arrangement as a signifier of danger meaning, "get out fast, as hobos are not welcome in the area". Another arrow rests on the ground. It is the only one bearing a fletching and is akin to a syringe. Hobos are vagabond workers who first appeared after the American Civil War and were a common sight during the Great Depression. Charlie Chaplin famously played the role of the hobo in his 1915 film The Tramp. Hobo symbols are clandestine markings providing fellow travelers with vital information regarding safety and shelter. Dreyfuss' The Symbol Sourcebook and specifically the included hobo signs were part of Basquiat's often referenced book collection.

==== Teeth ====
There are hidden words in this work. Upon closer inspection the painting reveals text embedded in the figure's teeth. The letters spell out "HAVE TEETH." The primitively rendered character bears a wide grin, "[creating] the illusion of the teeth by this alignment of letters". This manner of portraying teeth is a recurring theme in Basquiat's work. For Basquiat teeth represent the ability to speak. "HAVE TEETH" is the access to speech. "Speech is a cry and that of Basquiat, that of a planetary warrior," as Jane Rankin-Reid wrote, observing "the constant use he made of the terms associated with verbal expression, THROAT, MOUTH, TEETH." "In the context of the 1980s, Jean-Michel Basquiat felt that the time had come to inform a new word by using painting to retrieve a formal vocabulary of figures, 'pictograms' and 'mythograms' derived from the desire of a population to make its voice heard. By choosing to make painting a screen, the ideal place for an inscription, Basquiat joined the camp of Dubuffet and Twombly. Following the example of these giants, his art swells from a specifically existential dimension that universalizes it," wrote the museum curator Marie-Claire Ades.

== See also ==
- List of paintings by Jean-Michel Basquiat
- 1982 in art

== Bibliography ==
- Jean-Michel Basquiat, Richard D. Marshall, edited by Galerie Enrico Navarra, 1996, Paris. Painting reproduced under number 7 page 84. ISBN 978-2911596131
- Jean-Michel Basquiat, Richard D. Marshall, Jean-Louis Prat, Bruno Bischofberger, edited by Galerie Enrico Navarra, 1992, Paris. Painting reproduced under number 7 page 132. ISBN 978-2911596131
- Eric Fretz, Jean-Michel Basquiat - A Biography, Greenwood Biographies, 2000. ISBN 978-0313380563
- Michel Nuridsany, Jean-Michel Basquiat, Flammarion, 2015. ISBN 978-2081277649
- Keith Richards et James Fox, Life, Robert Laffont, 2011. ISBN 978-0316034418
- Jean-Michel Basquiat, Peinture, Dessin, Écriture, Catalogue d'exposition du musée-galerie de la Seita du 17 décembre 1993 au 26 février 1994, Paris. Painting reproduced under number 12 page 40. ISBN 978-2906524552
- Jennifer Clement, Widow Basquiat, A Memoir, Canongate Books, 2000. ISBN 978-0553419917
- Andy Warhol and Pat Hackett, POPism : The Warhol Sixties, Houghton Mifflin Harcourt. ISBN 978-1417616282
- Henry Dreyfuss, Symbol Sourcebook: An Authoritative Guide to International Graphic Symbols, John Wiley & Sons, 1984. ISBN 978-1417616282
- Henry Gray, Gray's Anatomy, Lea & Febiger. ISBN 978-0812103779
