= Gem Spa =

Former newspaper stand and candy store in New York City

Coordinates: 40°43′43″N 73°59′16.5″W

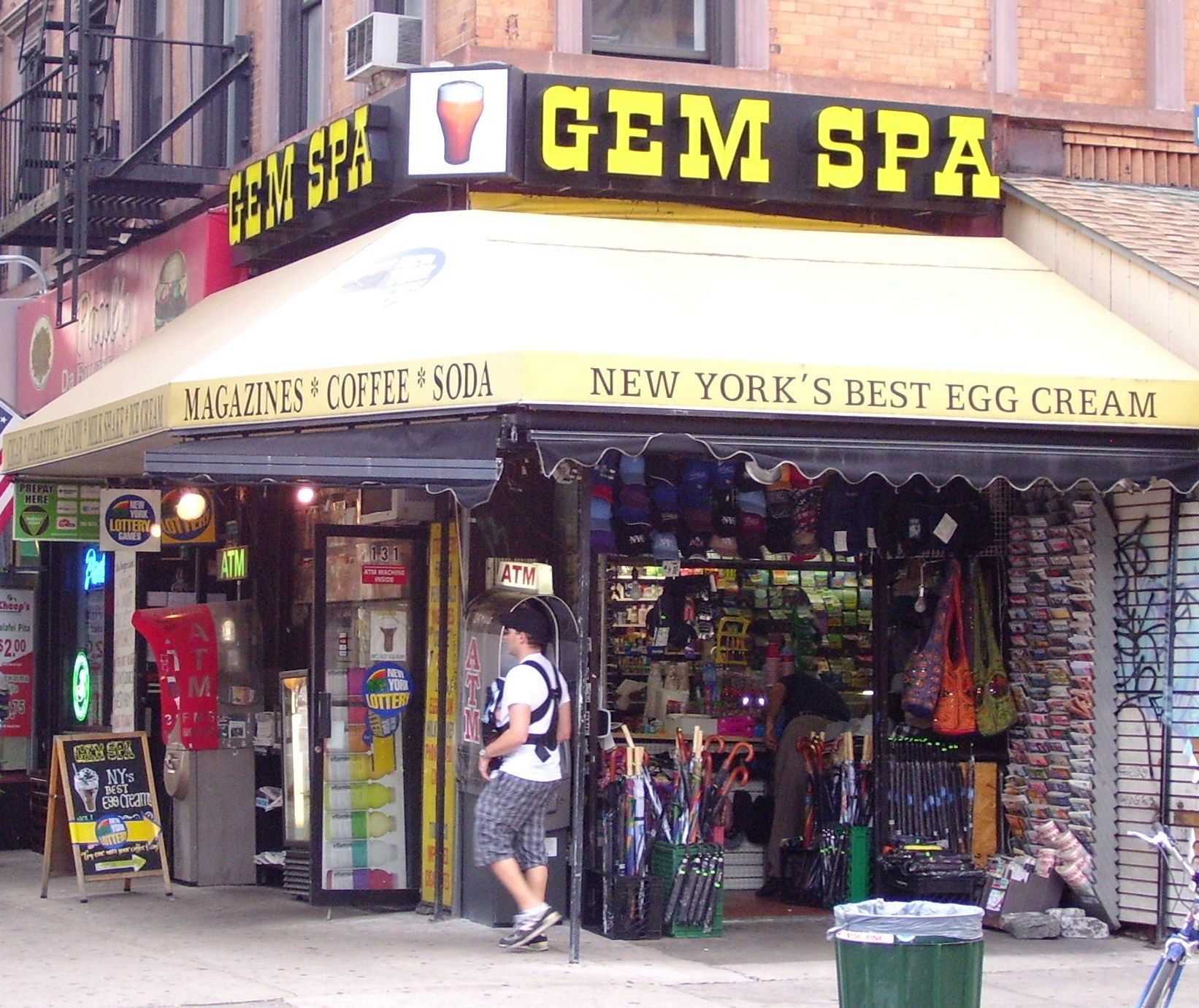
- (2010)
- Company type: Private
- Genre: Newsstand; Candy store
- Predecessor: None
- Founded: 1921
- Founder: Goldfeder family
- Defunct: 2020
- Fate: Bankruptcy
- Successor: Poetica Coffee
- Headquarters: 131 Second Ave. at St. Mark's Place; Manhattan, New York City
- Area served: East Village
- Products: Egg cream, Newspapers, Magazines
- Services: Newspapers, magazine, food and mini mart services
- Owner: Goldfeder family (1920s-1957); Ruby Silverstein and Harold Shepard (1957-~1969); Irving Stein (1971); Ray Patel (1986-2020)

Gem Spa was a newspaper stand and candy store located on the corner of St. Mark's Place and Second Avenue in the East Village neighborhood of Manhattan, New York City. It opened under another name in the 1920s, and was renamed in 1957. It was open 24 hours a day, and was long considered to have the best authentic New York City–style egg cream, which its awning described as "New York's Best."

Often referred to as a bodega, in the 1950s, Gem Spa was a gathering place for beats, and in the 1960s it was a hippie hangout, known for selling a wide selection of underground newspapers. New York Magazine named it the best newsstand in the East Village in 2001.

On May 7, 2020, owner Parul Patel announced that the physical store would not re-open due to the impact of the COVID-19 pandemic and rent increases, despite community efforts and a social media campaign to keep it open.

The building in which Gem Spa was located, 131 Second Avenue, or 36 St. Marks Place, was built in 1898 to 1900 and was designed by Louis F. Heinecke in the Renaissance Revival style. It is located within the East Village/Lower East Side Historic District, which was created in October 2012.

== History ==
The site was an outlet for the Chain Shirt Shop in 1922, and "Gem's Spa" had opened by the 1950s. Sociologist Daniel Bell, who claimed in the 1970s that his uncle Hymie created the egg cream, says that another man called Hymie owned a candy store serving egg creams on the site of Gem Spa in the 1920s. Village Voice reported in the 1970s that people remembered going to the store before World War I. For thirty years up until 1957 the store was owned by the Goldfeder family.

It had been a Beat mecca in the 1950s, a hippie hangout in the sixties and more recently was the scene of a famous photograph of the Dolls.

— Gary Valentine of Blondie

From 1957 until at least 1969 the store was owned by Ruby Silverstein and Harold Shepard, who employed 11 staff to keep it open 24 hours a day – Silverstein estimated that every 30 seconds someone walked in the store. The clientele initially mainly bought Jewish and foreign-language papers, which began to change around 1963 as they sold more copies of the Village Voice and underground magazines. Silverstein and Shepard gave the store its current name, initially Gem's Spa - the name came from Gladys, Etta, and Miriam, the names of the wives of Silverstein and Shepard and Shepard's ex-wife.

In 1966, The Village Voice called it the "official oasis of the East Village"; it was known as a "hippie hangout". Abbie Hoffman gathered people for his 1967 protest at the New York Stock Exchange at Gem Spa, Allen Ginsberg called it a "nerve center" of the city, and the Art Workers' Coalition had their offices above the store. Robert Mapplethorpe bought Patti Smith an egg cream there shortly after she moved to New York in 1967. In the late 1960s it was midway between two other iconic venues, the Fillmore East and the Electric Circus.

The owner in 1971 was Irving Stein. That year Village Voice reported "A permanent cluster of junkies using its doorways and newspaper benches as home base hasn't helped business any" and the store was closed for a time from February 1972 when it ran into financial trouble and the counter-culture that had helped support it collapsed. The storefront caught fire that May, but it reopened that June with new management.

The owner as of 2015 was Ray Patel, who was born in the early 1940s in Gujarat, India. He ran the store with his wife and bought the store in 1986, when he replaced one brick wall with glass. He did no advertising and relied instead on word of mouth. He learned making egg creams from the previous Italian owner, who in turn learned it from his Jewish predecessor. The store manager Salim said in 2010 that only four people knew the recipe. Patel's daughter Parul, a former Morgan Stanley financial advisor, took over the business from her father in 2018 because he was suffering from Parkinson's disease.

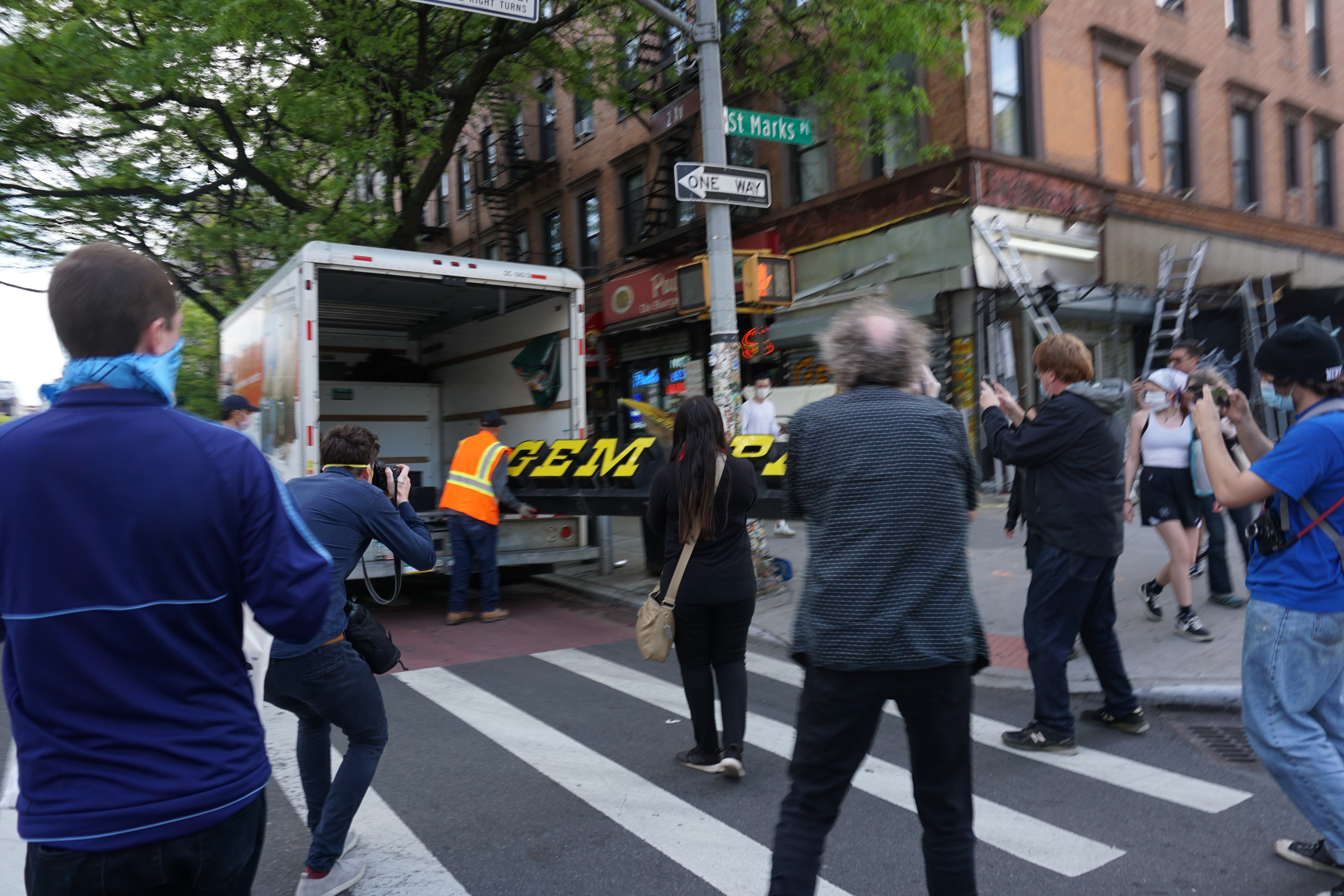
Gem Spa sign being removed from the storefront on May 17th, 2020.

Gem Spa merchandise was introduced for the first time in 2019, and its T-shirt became popular. So much so that Eater magazine called it the "Hottest Look in Streetwear" just a couple of days after Fashion Week ended in September 2019, after it caught the attention of fashion influencers like former Calvin Klein model Remy Holwick and designer Kyle Brincefield of Studmuffin NYC. While efforts to save it were underway, in May 2020, Gem Spa closed permanently, due to lack of business from the COVID-19 pandemic. After its closure, Gem Spa announced it would continue to operate an online store selling branded merchandise.

== In popular culture ==
Gem Spa is featured on the back cover of the first album by the seminal punk rockers the New York Dolls. Poets Allen Ginsberg and Ted Berrigan both mentioned the stand in their works. Gem Spa is the name of one of the main works painted by Jean-Michel Basquiat in 1982.
