= La Marqueta =

Markets in New York City

Coordinates: 40°47′52″N 73°56′40″W

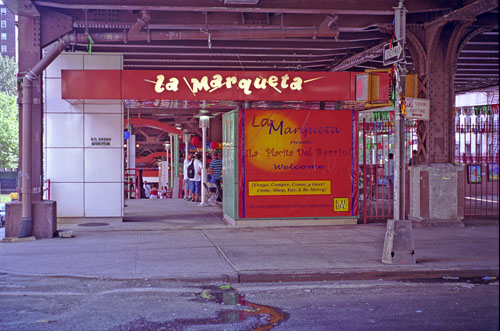
La Marqueta in June 2007

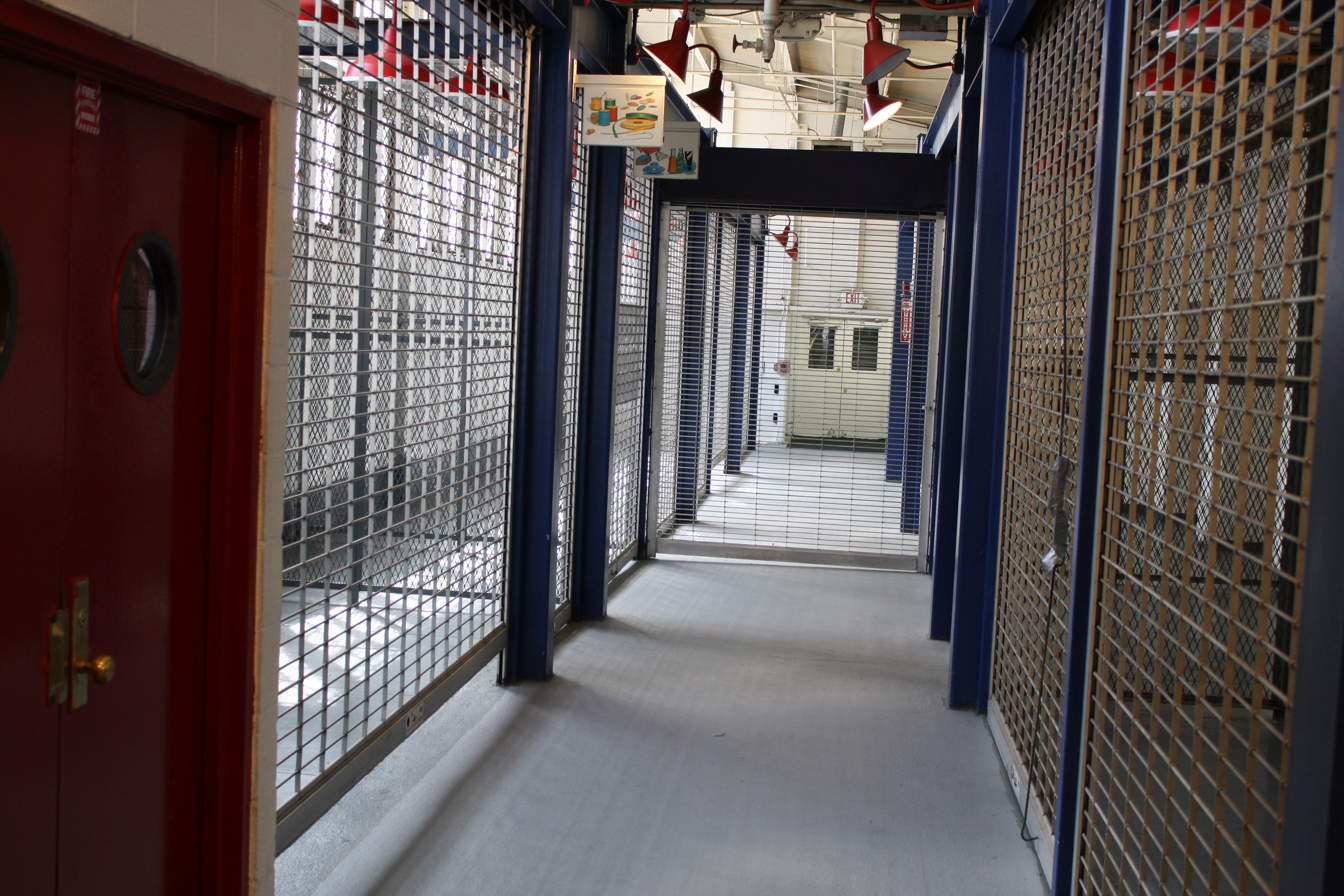
Vacant spaces in La Marqueta in October 2009

La Marqueta is a marketplace under the Metro-North Railroad's Park Avenue Viaduct between 111th Street and 116th Street on Park Avenue in East Harlem in Manhattan, New York City. Its official address is 1590 Park Avenue. In its heyday in the 1950s and 1960s, over 500 vendors operated out of La Marqueta, and it was an important social and economic venue for Hispanic New York. The New York Times called it "the most visible symbol of [the] neighborhood." It has since dwindled in size.

The market was originally an informal gathering place for pushcart vendors and other merchants, but since 1936 it has been officially sanctioned, and vendors rent their stalls from the city. It was once possible to buy food, traditional medicines, recordings of Latin music, and supplies for charms and curses at La Marqueta. It was also the meeting place for the neighborhood after urban renewal displaced countless small businesses, replacing them with only large scale housing. Today, three of the original five buildings that housed the market have been burned or torn down, and a fourth is shuttered. As of May 2008, only four vendors were operating out of the last building, but the number later increased, reaching ten in early 2011.

The City of New York has repeatedly tried to revive La Marqueta but has failed to find a viable business model that also pleases local residents and politicians. The Harlem Community Development Corporation, a state-run economic development agency, has proposed a concept called La Marqueta Mile. In 2010, the proposal won the support of the Center for an Urban Future.

In 2009, New York City Economic Development Corporation (NYCEDC) and the New York City Council issued a request for proposals for businesses to operate and maintain a 3,000 square foot commercial kitchen incubator in La Marqueta. In early 2011, HBK Incubates, a food business incubator run by Hot Bread Kitchen, opened in a space at La Marqueta that had been renovated with $1.5 million in New York City Council funds.

In April 2026, New York City mayor Zohran Mamdani announced that he planned to open the first city-owned grocery store at La Marqueta. The store is expected to cost $30 million to build and be completed by the end of Mamdani's first term.
