= Handelsorganisation =

East German retailer

- Industry: Retail, hotels, dining, industrial goods
- Founded: 1948
- Defunct: 1990
- Number of locations: 35,000 (1960)
- Owner: Government of the German Democratic Republic

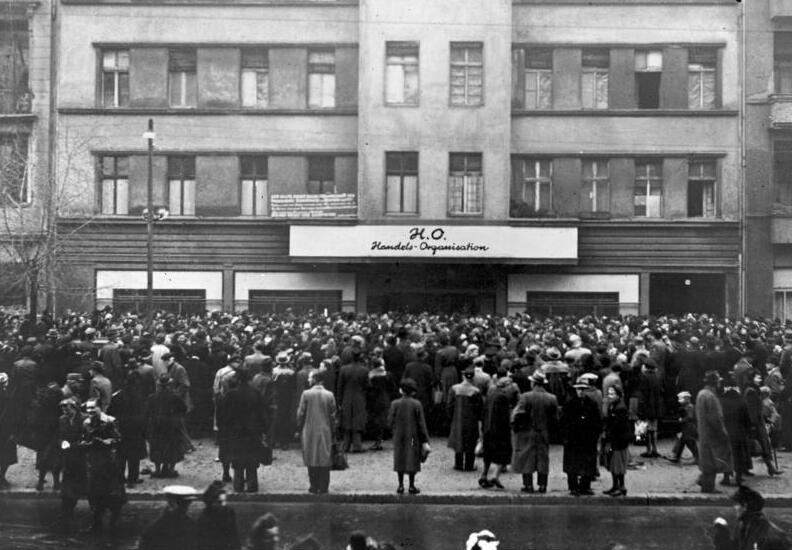
People outside the opening of the first HO Department Store in Berlin in November 1948

The Handelsorganisation (“Trading Organisation”, or HO) was a national retail business owned by the central administration of the Soviet Zone of occupation in Germany and from 1949 on by the state of the German Democratic Republic. It was created in 1948. The enterprise was arranged into different departments – industrial goods, food, restaurants and department stores – and operated the large “Centrum” department stores in many cities of the GDR. Its stores stood in competition to those of the Konsum cooperative. Nevertheless, both were established brands in the everyday life in the GDR. The HO also operated hotels. After the political turmoil in the GDR in the years 1989 and 1990 the business was sold by the Treuhand trust.

== See also ==
- Economy of the German Democratic Republic
