= Konsum (East Germany) =

Cooperative retail chain

- Konsum within the VDK by designer Karl Thewalt for the "Verband Deutscher Konsumgenossenschaften (VDK) der DDR"
- Type: Co-op
- Industry: Retail, restaurants, grocery stores
- Founded: 1945
- Headquarters: East Berlin
- Area served: former East Germany

Konsum (German pronunciation: [ˈkɔnzʊm]) is a cooperative retail chain founded in 1945 by the Soviet Military Administration in the Soviet Occupation Zone, which later became East Germany. It consisted of grocery stores, retail markets, industrial plants, and restaurants, and was a direct competitor to the Handelsorganisation.

After German reunification in 1990, Konsum was not dissolved, as it was not a state-owned enterprise like Handelsorganisation. Today, it exists in limited capacity, mostly as a real estate management cooperative.
