= List of minor planets: 442001–443000 =

The following is a partial list of minor planets, running from minor-planet number 442001 through 443000, inclusive. The primary data for this and other partial lists is based on JPL's "Small-Body Orbital Elements" and data available from the Minor Planet Center. Critical list information is also provided by the MPC, unless otherwise specified from Lowell Observatory. A detailed description of the table's columns and additional sources are given on the main page including a complete list of every page in this series, and a statistical break-up on the dynamical classification of minor planets.

Also see the summary list of all named bodies in numerical and alphabetical order, and the corresponding naming citations for the number range of this particular list. New namings may only be added to this list after official publication, as the preannouncement of names is condemned by the Working Group for Small Bodies Nomenclature of the International Astronomical Union.

Near-Earth obj.	MBA (inner)	MBA (outer)	Centaur
Mars-crosser	MBA (middle)	Jupiter trojan	Trans-Neptunian obj.
Unclassified

== 442001–442100 ==
Designation			Discovery			Properties		Ref
Permanent	Provisional	Named after	Date	Site	Discoverer(s)	Category	Diam.	Ref
442001	2010 OH_{15}	—	July 17, 2010	WISE	WISE	·	4.7 km	MPC · JPL
442002	2010 OX_{17}	—	July 18, 2010	WISE	WISE	·	4.5 km	MPC · JPL
442003	2010 ON_{19}	—	November 5, 2005	Kitt Peak	Spacewatch	·	4.5 km	MPC · JPL
442004	2010 OJ_{20}	—	May 28, 2008	Kitt Peak	Spacewatch	·	3.4 km	MPC · JPL
442005	2010 OY_{23}	—	July 18, 2010	WISE	WISE	·	2.0 km	MPC · JPL
442006	2010 OQ_{26}	—	July 19, 2010	WISE	WISE	·	5.4 km	MPC · JPL
442007	2010 OS_{38}	—	September 7, 2004	Kitt Peak	Spacewatch	·	3.9 km	MPC · JPL
442008	2010 OF_{40}	—	April 1, 2008	Mount Lemmon	Mount Lemmon Survey	·	3.7 km	MPC · JPL
442009	2010 OB_{42}	—	December 24, 2006	Kitt Peak	Spacewatch	·	3.5 km	MPC · JPL
442010	2010 OE_{43}	—	July 21, 2010	WISE	WISE	·	2.5 km	MPC · JPL
442011	2010 OK_{55}	—	July 23, 2010	WISE	WISE	·	3.8 km	MPC · JPL
442012	2010 OL_{67}	—	July 24, 2010	WISE	WISE	URS	3.2 km	MPC · JPL
442013	2010 OR_{68}	—	December 7, 2005	Kitt Peak	Spacewatch	HYG	3.3 km	MPC · JPL
442014	2010 OC_{70}	—	July 25, 2010	WISE	WISE	LIX	3.3 km	MPC · JPL
442015	2010 OS_{73}	—	July 25, 2010	WISE	WISE	·	4.3 km	MPC · JPL
442016	2010 OG_{81}	—	August 8, 2004	Anderson Mesa	LONEOS	·	3.5 km	MPC · JPL
442017	2010 OQ_{84}	—	November 29, 2005	Kitt Peak	Spacewatch	·	5.4 km	MPC · JPL
442018	2010 OZ_{87}	—	April 13, 2008	Kitt Peak	Spacewatch	·	3.2 km	MPC · JPL
442019	2010 OO_{94}	—	April 24, 2003	Kitt Peak	Spacewatch	·	3.7 km	MPC · JPL
442020	2010 OB_{103}	—	July 28, 2010	WISE	WISE	·	2.3 km	MPC · JPL
442021	2010 OC_{104}	—	September 7, 2004	Kitt Peak	Spacewatch	·	4.5 km	MPC · JPL
442022	2010 OO_{104}	—	April 15, 2008	Mount Lemmon	Mount Lemmon Survey	VER	3.1 km	MPC · JPL
442023	2010 OV_{115}	—	July 30, 2010	WISE	WISE	·	3.2 km	MPC · JPL
442024	2010 OK_{116}	—	December 2, 2005	Mount Lemmon	Mount Lemmon Survey	·	3.0 km	MPC · JPL
442025	2010 OG_{117}	—	July 30, 2010	WISE	WISE	·	3.3 km	MPC · JPL
442026	2010 OZ_{119}	—	July 31, 2010	WISE	WISE	·	3.4 km	MPC · JPL
442027	2010 OH_{127}	—	January 28, 2007	Mount Lemmon	Mount Lemmon Survey	·	2.4 km	MPC · JPL
442028	2010 PA_{4}	—	December 27, 2006	Mount Lemmon	Mount Lemmon Survey	·	4.9 km	MPC · JPL
442029	2010 PZ_{4}	—	August 1, 2010	WISE	WISE	URS	4.3 km	MPC · JPL
442030	2010 PR_{6}	—	December 25, 2005	Kitt Peak	Spacewatch	LIX	3.0 km	MPC · JPL
442031	2010 PW_{10}	—	April 6, 2008	Kitt Peak	Spacewatch	·	4.8 km	MPC · JPL
442032	2010 PH_{19}	—	August 4, 2010	WISE	WISE	VER	3.2 km	MPC · JPL
442033	2010 PV_{27}	—	August 5, 2010	WISE	WISE	·	2.6 km	MPC · JPL
442034	2010 PY_{35}	—	May 14, 2008	Mount Lemmon	Mount Lemmon Survey	VER	3.9 km	MPC · JPL
442035	2010 PT_{64}	—	August 10, 2010	Kitt Peak	Spacewatch	EOS	2.1 km	MPC · JPL
442036	2010 PP_{65}	—	November 30, 2008	Mount Lemmon	Mount Lemmon Survey	H	680 m	MPC · JPL
442037	2010 PR_{66}	—	August 15, 2010	Socorro	LINEAR	T_{j} (2.82) · APO · PHA · fast	700 m	MPC · JPL
442038	2010 PG_{69}	—	August 10, 2010	Kitt Peak	Spacewatch	·	4.0 km	MPC · JPL
442039	2010 PW_{80}	—	January 19, 2002	Kitt Peak	Spacewatch	·	2.8 km	MPC · JPL
442040	2010 RG_{5}	—	August 10, 2010	Kitt Peak	Spacewatch	·	2.7 km	MPC · JPL
442041	2010 RA_{10}	—	October 6, 2005	Kitt Peak	Spacewatch	·	1.7 km	MPC · JPL
442042	2010 RV_{10}	—	September 2, 2010	Mount Lemmon	Mount Lemmon Survey	EOS	2.1 km	MPC · JPL
442043	2010 RX_{10}	—	September 2, 2010	Mount Lemmon	Mount Lemmon Survey	·	1.7 km	MPC · JPL
442044	2010 RA_{11}	—	September 2, 2010	Mount Lemmon	Mount Lemmon Survey	·	1.4 km	MPC · JPL
442045	2010 RF_{19}	—	October 1, 2005	Kitt Peak	Spacewatch	·	2.6 km	MPC · JPL
442046	2010 RY_{28}	—	September 23, 2001	Kitt Peak	Spacewatch	·	2.2 km	MPC · JPL
442047	2010 RG_{30}	—	September 4, 2010	Mount Lemmon	Mount Lemmon Survey	·	2.0 km	MPC · JPL
442048	2010 RQ_{32}	—	August 31, 2005	Kitt Peak	Spacewatch	EOS	1.6 km	MPC · JPL
442049	2010 RY_{47}	—	August 6, 2010	Kitt Peak	Spacewatch	·	2.0 km	MPC · JPL
442050	2010 RK_{48}	—	February 26, 2007	Mount Lemmon	Mount Lemmon Survey	·	2.6 km	MPC · JPL
442051	2010 RY_{49}	—	September 4, 2010	Kitt Peak	Spacewatch	TIR	3.9 km	MPC · JPL
442052	2010 RF_{53}	—	September 6, 2010	Socorro	LINEAR	·	2.7 km	MPC · JPL
442053	2010 RC_{57}	—	January 17, 2007	Kitt Peak	Spacewatch	·	2.9 km	MPC · JPL
442054	2010 RP_{58}	—	September 5, 2010	Mount Lemmon	Mount Lemmon Survey	·	3.2 km	MPC · JPL
442055	2010 RB_{60}	—	January 28, 2007	Kitt Peak	Spacewatch	VER	3.3 km	MPC · JPL
442056	2010 RB_{61}	—	September 6, 2010	Kitt Peak	Spacewatch	·	3.0 km	MPC · JPL
442057	2010 RC_{62}	—	September 7, 2010	La Sagra	OAM	·	4.0 km	MPC · JPL
442058	2010 RN_{107}	—	September 10, 2010	Kitt Peak	Spacewatch	·	3.3 km	MPC · JPL
442059	2010 RN_{110}	—	November 6, 2005	Mount Lemmon	Mount Lemmon Survey	·	1.8 km	MPC · JPL
442060	2010 RS_{111}	—	September 11, 2010	Kitt Peak	Spacewatch	·	3.3 km	MPC · JPL
442061	2010 RF_{113}	—	March 10, 2008	Kitt Peak	Spacewatch	·	2.7 km	MPC · JPL
442062	2010 RA_{115}	—	September 11, 2010	Kitt Peak	Spacewatch	·	3.1 km	MPC · JPL
442063	2010 RB_{124}	—	September 11, 2010	Mount Lemmon	Mount Lemmon Survey	·	2.2 km	MPC · JPL
442064	2010 RU_{134}	—	March 18, 2009	Kitt Peak	Spacewatch	·	2.1 km	MPC · JPL
442065	2010 RH_{136}	—	October 10, 1999	Kitt Peak	Spacewatch	·	2.9 km	MPC · JPL
442066	2010 RQ_{142}	—	August 6, 2010	Kitt Peak	Spacewatch	·	2.8 km	MPC · JPL
442067	2010 RD_{144}	—	April 26, 2003	Campo Imperatore	CINEOS	·	3.4 km	MPC · JPL
442068	2010 RE_{144}	—	September 10, 2010	Kitt Peak	Spacewatch	·	2.7 km	MPC · JPL
442069	2010 RP_{149}	—	September 15, 2010	Kitt Peak	Spacewatch	EOS	1.7 km	MPC · JPL
442070	2010 RC_{150}	—	September 15, 2010	Kitt Peak	Spacewatch	EOS	1.7 km	MPC · JPL
442071	2010 RV_{151}	—	October 30, 2005	Kitt Peak	Spacewatch	THM	1.5 km	MPC · JPL
442072	2010 RX_{154}	—	September 15, 2010	Kitt Peak	Spacewatch	·	3.9 km	MPC · JPL
442073	2010 RA_{155}	—	September 15, 2010	Kitt Peak	Spacewatch	·	2.2 km	MPC · JPL
442074	2010 RL_{158}	—	January 17, 2007	Kitt Peak	Spacewatch	·	2.7 km	MPC · JPL
442075	2010 RX_{164}	—	January 10, 2007	Kitt Peak	Spacewatch	·	2.3 km	MPC · JPL
442076	2010 RX_{175}	—	September 10, 2010	Kitt Peak	Spacewatch	·	2.6 km	MPC · JPL
442077	2010 RE_{176}	—	September 10, 2010	Kitt Peak	Spacewatch	EOS	1.7 km	MPC · JPL
442078	2010 RB_{178}	—	November 5, 1999	Kitt Peak	Spacewatch	·	2.4 km	MPC · JPL
442079	2010 RA_{180}	—	April 5, 2003	Kitt Peak	Spacewatch	THM	2.7 km	MPC · JPL
442080	2010 SD_{8}	—	March 5, 2008	Mount Lemmon	Mount Lemmon Survey	·	2.2 km	MPC · JPL
442081	2010 SO_{15}	—	January 14, 2002	Kitt Peak	Spacewatch	EOS	2.1 km	MPC · JPL
442082	2010 SF_{20}	—	September 14, 2010	Kitt Peak	Spacewatch	·	2.6 km	MPC · JPL
442083	2010 SQ_{21}	—	September 14, 1999	Kitt Peak	Spacewatch	THM	1.9 km	MPC · JPL
442084	2010 SZ_{33}	—	October 31, 2005	Mount Lemmon	Mount Lemmon Survey	·	2.0 km	MPC · JPL
442085	2010 SE_{37}	—	March 10, 2007	Mount Lemmon	Mount Lemmon Survey	·	3.1 km	MPC · JPL
442086	2010 SR_{38}	—	January 25, 2006	Catalina	CSS	H	790 m	MPC · JPL
442087	2010 SF_{39}	—	September 17, 2010	Catalina	CSS	·	3.1 km	MPC · JPL
442088	2010 TL_{1}	—	October 3, 1999	Kitt Peak	Spacewatch	·	2.2 km	MPC · JPL
442089	2010 TO_{8}	—	September 2, 2010	Mount Lemmon	Mount Lemmon Survey	·	2.5 km	MPC · JPL
442090	2010 TT_{14}	—	February 21, 2007	Kitt Peak	Spacewatch	·	2.9 km	MPC · JPL
442091	2010 TQ_{26}	—	September 19, 2010	Kitt Peak	Spacewatch	·	2.5 km	MPC · JPL
442092	2010 TK_{28}	—	March 12, 2008	Kitt Peak	Spacewatch	·	2.5 km	MPC · JPL
442093	2010 TR_{28}	—	November 3, 2005	Mount Lemmon	Mount Lemmon Survey	·	1.9 km	MPC · JPL
442094	2010 TA_{34}	—	March 14, 2007	Mount Lemmon	Mount Lemmon Survey	·	2.4 km	MPC · JPL
442095	2010 TP_{39}	—	December 1, 2005	Mount Lemmon	Mount Lemmon Survey	·	2.1 km	MPC · JPL
442096	2010 TG_{53}	—	November 30, 2005	Kitt Peak	Spacewatch	THM	1.7 km	MPC · JPL
442097	2010 TX_{65}	—	October 25, 2005	Kitt Peak	Spacewatch	(31811)	2.7 km	MPC · JPL
442098	2010 TQ_{67}	—	October 6, 2005	Kitt Peak	Spacewatch	·	1.9 km	MPC · JPL
442099	2010 TD_{69}	—	July 6, 2010	WISE	WISE	VER	3.4 km	MPC · JPL
442100	2010 TR_{70}	—	October 22, 2005	Kitt Peak	Spacewatch	EOS	1.7 km	MPC · JPL

== 442101–442200 ==
back to top

Designation			Discovery			Properties		Ref
Permanent	Provisional	Named after	Date	Site	Discoverer(s)	Category	Diam.	Ref
442101	2010 TQ_{75}	—	October 27, 2005	Mount Lemmon	Mount Lemmon Survey	THM	2.2 km	MPC · JPL
442102	2010 TR_{75}	—	September 17, 2010	Kitt Peak	Spacewatch	HYG	2.1 km	MPC · JPL
442103	2010 TW_{84}	—	September 11, 2010	Kitt Peak	Spacewatch	·	2.7 km	MPC · JPL
442104	2010 TQ_{98}	—	December 1, 2005	Mount Lemmon	Mount Lemmon Survey	THM	1.7 km	MPC · JPL
442105	2010 TR_{98}	—	November 1, 2005	Kitt Peak	Spacewatch	·	1.5 km	MPC · JPL
442106	2010 TS_{99}	—	September 16, 2010	Kitt Peak	Spacewatch	EOS	1.8 km	MPC · JPL
442107	2010 TX_{99}	—	December 1, 2005	Kitt Peak	Spacewatch	·	3.0 km	MPC · JPL
442108	2010 TC_{135}	—	October 11, 2010	Mount Lemmon	Mount Lemmon Survey	·	2.8 km	MPC · JPL
442109	2010 TR_{144}	—	November 26, 2005	Kitt Peak	Spacewatch	·	1.9 km	MPC · JPL
442110	2010 TM_{154}	—	September 30, 2010	Catalina	CSS	LIX	3.7 km	MPC · JPL
442111	2010 TS_{157}	—	October 24, 2005	Kitt Peak	Spacewatch	EOS	1.9 km	MPC · JPL
442112	2010 TH_{159}	—	September 17, 2010	Kitt Peak	Spacewatch	HYG	2.9 km	MPC · JPL
442113	2010 TE_{161}	—	October 31, 1999	Kitt Peak	Spacewatch	THM	1.7 km	MPC · JPL
442114	2010 TG_{161}	—	October 10, 2010	Mount Lemmon	Mount Lemmon Survey	·	2.4 km	MPC · JPL
442115	2010 TE_{166}	—	October 9, 2010	Catalina	CSS	EOS	2.5 km	MPC · JPL
442116	2010 TA_{169}	—	December 13, 2006	Kitt Peak	Spacewatch	·	2.2 km	MPC · JPL
442117	2010 TK_{173}	—	August 15, 2004	Campo Imperatore	CINEOS	·	2.5 km	MPC · JPL
442118	2010 TP_{174}	—	September 18, 2010	Mount Lemmon	Mount Lemmon Survey	·	2.8 km	MPC · JPL
442119	2010 TR_{174}	—	October 7, 2010	Catalina	CSS	·	3.7 km	MPC · JPL
442120	2010 TA_{177}	—	November 10, 2005	Catalina	CSS	·	2.8 km	MPC · JPL
442121	2010 TR_{177}	—	October 1, 2010	Catalina	CSS	·	3.4 km	MPC · JPL
442122	2010 TL_{178}	—	September 15, 2010	Kitt Peak	Spacewatch	·	2.5 km	MPC · JPL
442123	2010 TT_{178}	—	March 11, 2008	Kitt Peak	Spacewatch	·	3.4 km	MPC · JPL
442124	2010 TQ_{179}	—	March 30, 2008	Kitt Peak	Spacewatch	·	3.1 km	MPC · JPL
442125	2010 TS_{184}	—	October 8, 1993	Kitt Peak	Spacewatch	·	4.1 km	MPC · JPL
442126	2010 TZ_{185}	—	February 21, 2007	Mount Lemmon	Mount Lemmon Survey	VER	2.7 km	MPC · JPL
442127	2010 UL_{11}	—	November 25, 2005	Kitt Peak	Spacewatch	·	1.8 km	MPC · JPL
442128	2010 UY_{26}	—	August 12, 2010	Kitt Peak	Spacewatch	·	2.5 km	MPC · JPL
442129	2010 UA_{27}	—	October 7, 2004	Anderson Mesa	LONEOS	·	3.9 km	MPC · JPL
442130	2010 UK_{31}	—	September 11, 2004	Kitt Peak	Spacewatch	·	3.2 km	MPC · JPL
442131	2010 UB_{33}	—	November 30, 2005	Kitt Peak	Spacewatch	·	2.8 km	MPC · JPL
442132	2010 UE_{33}	—	October 29, 2010	Mount Lemmon	Mount Lemmon Survey	·	3.3 km	MPC · JPL
442133	2010 UX_{37}	—	September 16, 2010	Catalina	CSS	H	490 m	MPC · JPL
442134	2010 UW_{42}	—	November 1, 1999	Kitt Peak	Spacewatch	HYG	2.2 km	MPC · JPL
442135	2010 UK_{69}	—	July 21, 2010	WISE	WISE	·	3.7 km	MPC · JPL
442136	2010 US_{78}	—	September 3, 2010	Mount Lemmon	Mount Lemmon Survey	·	3.5 km	MPC · JPL
442137	2010 UQ_{82}	—	August 8, 2010	WISE	WISE	·	3.2 km	MPC · JPL
442138	2010 UR_{82}	—	September 14, 1999	Catalina	CSS	·	2.3 km	MPC · JPL
442139	2010 UW_{92}	—	September 11, 2004	Socorro	LINEAR	URS	3.7 km	MPC · JPL
442140	2010 UE_{93}	—	December 30, 2005	Mount Lemmon	Mount Lemmon Survey	HYG	2.4 km	MPC · JPL
442141	2010 UX_{94}	—	October 12, 2010	Mount Lemmon	Mount Lemmon Survey	·	3.1 km	MPC · JPL
442142	2010 UJ_{98}	—	February 21, 2007	Kitt Peak	Spacewatch	EOS	2.0 km	MPC · JPL
442143	2010 UF_{99}	—	September 11, 2010	Mount Lemmon	Mount Lemmon Survey	HYG	2.4 km	MPC · JPL
442144	2010 VA_{31}	—	September 11, 2010	Mount Lemmon	Mount Lemmon Survey	·	2.9 km	MPC · JPL
442145	2010 VZ_{48}	—	October 11, 2005	Kitt Peak	Spacewatch	EOS	2.8 km	MPC · JPL
442146	2010 VH_{59}	—	November 4, 2010	Mount Lemmon	Mount Lemmon Survey	·	3.2 km	MPC · JPL
442147	2010 VK_{59}	—	August 6, 2010	WISE	WISE	·	4.2 km	MPC · JPL
442148	2010 VC_{62}	—	May 25, 2007	Mount Lemmon	Mount Lemmon Survey	·	430 m	MPC · JPL
442149	2010 VB_{106}	—	October 9, 2004	Anderson Mesa	LONEOS	·	3.4 km	MPC · JPL
442150	2010 VV_{117}	—	December 30, 2005	Kitt Peak	Spacewatch	·	3.9 km	MPC · JPL
442151	2010 VW_{121}	—	October 7, 2004	Kitt Peak	Spacewatch	VER	2.6 km	MPC · JPL
442152	2010 VV_{183}	—	December 4, 2005	Kitt Peak	Spacewatch	·	3.3 km	MPC · JPL
442153	2010 VO_{188}	—	February 16, 2001	Kitt Peak	Spacewatch	·	3.2 km	MPC · JPL
442154	2010 VB_{191}	—	December 8, 2005	Kitt Peak	Spacewatch	TIR	2.5 km	MPC · JPL
442155	2010 VA_{195}	—	May 12, 2004	Siding Spring	SSS	H	690 m	MPC · JPL
442156	2010 VC_{198}	—	November 10, 2005	Mount Lemmon	Mount Lemmon Survey	·	2.4 km	MPC · JPL
442157	2010 VT_{198}	—	September 5, 2010	Mount Lemmon	Mount Lemmon Survey	HYG	3.2 km	MPC · JPL
442158	2010 VF_{201}	—	January 6, 2006	Catalina	CSS	·	4.2 km	MPC · JPL
442159	2010 VD_{203}	—	February 23, 2007	Kitt Peak	Spacewatch	EOS	2.2 km	MPC · JPL
442160	2010 VY_{203}	—	October 9, 2010	Catalina	CSS	·	3.1 km	MPC · JPL
442161	2010 VB_{204}	—	August 21, 2004	Kitt Peak	Spacewatch	·	3.0 km	MPC · JPL
442162	2010 VG_{204}	—	September 30, 2005	Mount Lemmon	Mount Lemmon Survey	EOS	2.0 km	MPC · JPL
442163	2010 VN_{204}	—	November 12, 2005	Kitt Peak	Spacewatch	·	2.1 km	MPC · JPL
442164	2010 VM_{205}	—	August 23, 2004	Kitt Peak	Spacewatch	·	2.7 km	MPC · JPL
442165	2010 VU_{205}	—	October 8, 2004	Kitt Peak	Spacewatch	·	2.3 km	MPC · JPL
442166	2010 VK_{206}	—	November 30, 2005	Kitt Peak	Spacewatch	EOS	2.1 km	MPC · JPL
442167	2010 VR_{206}	—	September 17, 2004	Kitt Peak	Spacewatch	·	2.4 km	MPC · JPL
442168	2010 VJ_{210}	—	September 12, 2004	Kitt Peak	Spacewatch	·	2.8 km	MPC · JPL
442169	2010 VG_{212}	—	November 7, 2010	Kitt Peak	Spacewatch	EOS	2.0 km	MPC · JPL
442170	2010 VE_{220}	—	December 27, 2005	Kitt Peak	Spacewatch	·	3.0 km	MPC · JPL
442171	2010 WV_{11}	—	December 4, 2005	Mount Lemmon	Mount Lemmon Survey	·	2.9 km	MPC · JPL
442172	2010 WB_{50}	—	November 15, 2002	Socorro	LINEAR	H	690 m	MPC · JPL
442173	2010 WV_{51}	—	November 28, 2010	Mount Lemmon	Mount Lemmon Survey	L4	7.5 km	MPC · JPL
442174	2010 WY_{61}	—	November 3, 2004	Kitt Peak	Spacewatch	·	2.9 km	MPC · JPL
442175	2010 WR_{74}	—	May 2, 2003	Kitt Peak	Spacewatch	EOS	2.5 km	MPC · JPL
442176	2010 XQ_{1}	—	October 3, 1999	Kitt Peak	Spacewatch	·	3.0 km	MPC · JPL
442177	2010 XC_{24}	—	December 7, 2010	Mount Lemmon	Mount Lemmon Survey	AMO	370 m	MPC · JPL
442178	2010 XH_{40}	—	January 22, 2006	Catalina	CSS	·	5.0 km	MPC · JPL
442179	2010 XG_{45}	—	December 28, 2005	Kitt Peak	Spacewatch	·	2.7 km	MPC · JPL
442180	2010 XM_{83}	—	February 25, 2006	Catalina	CSS	·	3.4 km	MPC · JPL
442181	2011 AC_{16}	—	January 3, 2011	Catalina	CSS	H	570 m	MPC · JPL
442182	2011 AL_{75}	—	February 22, 2004	Socorro	LINEAR	PHO	1.2 km	MPC · JPL
442183	2011 CX_{117}	—	April 13, 2004	Kitt Peak	Spacewatch	3:2	3.4 km	MPC · JPL
442184	2011 DB_{23}	—	February 11, 2011	Mount Lemmon	Mount Lemmon Survey	·	730 m	MPC · JPL
442185	2011 EY_{9}	—	September 25, 2009	Kitt Peak	Spacewatch	·	560 m	MPC · JPL
442186	2011 EP_{45}	—	April 30, 2008	Mount Lemmon	Mount Lemmon Survey	·	610 m	MPC · JPL
442187	2011 EB_{50}	—	November 22, 2006	Kitt Peak	Spacewatch	·	770 m	MPC · JPL
442188	2011 ED_{53}	—	March 9, 2011	Kitt Peak	Spacewatch	·	680 m	MPC · JPL
442189	2011 ER_{54}	—	January 8, 2011	Mount Lemmon	Mount Lemmon Survey	NYS	1.1 km	MPC · JPL
442190	2011 EC_{72}	—	March 17, 2004	Kitt Peak	Spacewatch	·	720 m	MPC · JPL
442191	2011 EG_{74}	—	March 11, 2011	Kitt Peak	Spacewatch	·	710 m	MPC · JPL
442192	2011 EG_{78}	—	November 19, 2006	Kitt Peak	Spacewatch	·	760 m	MPC · JPL
442193	2011 EB_{82}	—	September 15, 1996	Kitt Peak	Spacewatch	·	600 m	MPC · JPL
442194	2011 FP_{7}	—	April 12, 2004	Kitt Peak	Spacewatch	·	730 m	MPC · JPL
442195	2011 FP_{13}	—	March 7, 2007	Mount Lemmon	Mount Lemmon Survey	·	990 m	MPC · JPL
442196	2011 FP_{56}	—	May 15, 2004	Socorro	LINEAR	·	920 m	MPC · JPL
442197	2011 FS_{56}	—	October 16, 2009	Mount Lemmon	Mount Lemmon Survey	·	1.0 km	MPC · JPL
442198	2011 FW_{56}	—	October 28, 2005	Kitt Peak	Spacewatch	·	700 m	MPC · JPL
442199	2011 FH_{67}	—	May 6, 2008	Mount Lemmon	Mount Lemmon Survey	·	690 m	MPC · JPL
442200	2011 FZ_{71}	—	January 30, 2004	Kitt Peak	Spacewatch	·	730 m	MPC · JPL

== 442201–442300 ==
back to top

Designation			Discovery			Properties		Ref
Permanent	Provisional	Named after	Date	Site	Discoverer(s)	Category	Diam.	Ref
442201	2011 FA_{147}	—	March 11, 2011	Mount Lemmon	Mount Lemmon Survey	·	820 m	MPC · JPL
442202	2011 GV_{30}	—	November 4, 1999	Kitt Peak	Spacewatch	·	660 m	MPC · JPL
442203	2011 GW_{31}	—	September 19, 2001	Kitt Peak	Spacewatch	·	810 m	MPC · JPL
442204	2011 GZ_{47}	—	February 12, 2004	Kitt Peak	Spacewatch	·	450 m	MPC · JPL
442205	2011 GL_{52}	—	August 31, 2005	Kitt Peak	Spacewatch	·	690 m	MPC · JPL
442206	2011 GM_{67}	—	March 26, 2011	Mount Lemmon	Mount Lemmon Survey	·	860 m	MPC · JPL
442207	2011 GX_{69}	—	March 26, 2011	Kitt Peak	Spacewatch	·	680 m	MPC · JPL
442208	2011 GL_{72}	—	April 11, 2011	Mount Lemmon	Mount Lemmon Survey	·	670 m	MPC · JPL
442209	2011 GJ_{77}	—	May 13, 2004	Kitt Peak	Spacewatch	·	650 m	MPC · JPL
442210	2011 GK_{85}	—	March 27, 2011	Mount Lemmon	Mount Lemmon Survey	·	1.3 km	MPC · JPL
442211	2011 HP_{5}	—	June 16, 2004	Kitt Peak	Spacewatch	·	1.1 km	MPC · JPL
442212	2011 HN_{12}	—	February 6, 2007	Mount Lemmon	Mount Lemmon Survey	·	790 m	MPC · JPL
442213	2011 HR_{14}	—	April 1, 2011	Kitt Peak	Spacewatch	·	620 m	MPC · JPL
442214	2011 HS_{17}	—	April 25, 2000	Kitt Peak	Spacewatch	NYS	1.0 km	MPC · JPL
442215	2011 HZ_{17}	—	March 28, 2011	Kitt Peak	Spacewatch	·	570 m	MPC · JPL
442216	2011 HD_{18}	—	April 22, 2011	Kitt Peak	Spacewatch	·	630 m	MPC · JPL
442217	2011 HR_{25}	—	December 14, 2006	Mount Lemmon	Mount Lemmon Survey	·	720 m	MPC · JPL
442218	2011 HB_{37}	—	April 1, 2011	Kitt Peak	Spacewatch	·	790 m	MPC · JPL
442219	2011 HZ_{48}	—	April 27, 2011	Kitt Peak	Spacewatch	·	820 m	MPC · JPL
442220	2011 HT_{63}	—	April 24, 2011	Kitt Peak	Spacewatch	·	830 m	MPC · JPL
442221	2011 HB_{100}	—	April 2, 2011	Kitt Peak	Spacewatch	·	610 m	MPC · JPL
442222	2011 JA_{29}	—	April 5, 2011	Mount Lemmon	Mount Lemmon Survey	·	980 m	MPC · JPL
442223	2011 KX	—	August 21, 2004	Siding Spring	SSS	·	1.1 km	MPC · JPL
442224	2011 KS_{6}	—	April 21, 2004	Kitt Peak	Spacewatch	·	700 m	MPC · JPL
442225	2011 KQ_{7}	—	February 25, 2007	Mount Lemmon	Mount Lemmon Survey	·	1.1 km	MPC · JPL
442226	2011 KG_{26}	—	November 25, 2005	Mount Lemmon	Mount Lemmon Survey	·	1.1 km	MPC · JPL
442227	2011 KA_{31}	—	July 21, 2004	Siding Spring	SSS	MAS	700 m	MPC · JPL
442228	2011 KH_{31}	—	March 20, 2007	Mount Lemmon	Mount Lemmon Survey	·	1.2 km	MPC · JPL
442229	2011 KP_{44}	—	January 17, 2007	Kitt Peak	Spacewatch	·	760 m	MPC · JPL
442230	2011 KW_{44}	—	February 21, 2007	Kitt Peak	Spacewatch	NYS	840 m	MPC · JPL
442231	2011 KJ_{46}	—	November 9, 2009	Mount Lemmon	Mount Lemmon Survey	·	880 m	MPC · JPL
442232	2011 LQ_{4}	—	June 9, 2007	Kitt Peak	Spacewatch	·	1.5 km	MPC · JPL
442233	2011 LR_{9}	—	June 6, 2011	Mount Lemmon	Mount Lemmon Survey	V	790 m	MPC · JPL
442234	2011 LA_{11}	—	May 27, 2011	Kitt Peak	Spacewatch	·	910 m	MPC · JPL
442235	2011 LT_{14}	—	December 10, 2009	Mount Lemmon	Mount Lemmon Survey	·	720 m	MPC · JPL
442236	2011 LC_{18}	—	March 10, 2007	Mount Lemmon	Mount Lemmon Survey	·	950 m	MPC · JPL
442237	2011 LF_{19}	—	October 15, 2007	Mount Lemmon	Mount Lemmon Survey	·	1.3 km	MPC · JPL
442238	2011 LL_{19}	—	June 7, 2011	Catalina	CSS	·	2.5 km	MPC · JPL
442239	2011 LK_{28}	—	March 31, 2011	Mount Lemmon	Mount Lemmon Survey	NYS	1.1 km	MPC · JPL
442240	2011 MT_{4}	—	October 19, 1998	Smolyan	Radeva, V.	·	1.6 km	MPC · JPL
442241	2011 MM_{6}	—	October 21, 2008	Mount Lemmon	Mount Lemmon Survey	·	1.6 km	MPC · JPL
442242	2011 MT_{10}	—	June 25, 2011	Mount Lemmon	Mount Lemmon Survey	·	2.2 km	MPC · JPL
442243	2011 MD_{11}	—	June 26, 2011	Siding Spring	SSS	AMO +1km	860 m	MPC · JPL
442244	2011 OD_{2}	—	April 25, 2006	Siding Spring	SSS	EUN	1.2 km	MPC · JPL
442245	2011 OA_{4}	—	February 24, 2006	Kitt Peak	Spacewatch	·	1.2 km	MPC · JPL
442246	2011 OG_{4}	—	January 23, 2006	Kitt Peak	Spacewatch	PHO	1.4 km	MPC · JPL
442247	2011 OS_{11}	—	January 25, 2006	Kitt Peak	Spacewatch	PHO	970 m	MPC · JPL
442248	2011 OW_{15}	—	June 26, 2011	Mount Lemmon	Mount Lemmon Survey	NYS	1.3 km	MPC · JPL
442249	2011 OE_{19}	—	December 16, 2004	Kitt Peak	Spacewatch	·	1.5 km	MPC · JPL
442250	2011 OG_{23}	—	February 13, 2010	Catalina	CSS	·	2.1 km	MPC · JPL
442251	2011 ON_{27}	—	December 30, 2008	Mount Lemmon	Mount Lemmon Survey	·	1.4 km	MPC · JPL
442252	2011 OC_{56}	—	November 18, 2008	Kitt Peak	Spacewatch	NYS	1.1 km	MPC · JPL
442253	2011 PR_{1}	—	October 3, 2003	Kitt Peak	Spacewatch	·	600 m	MPC · JPL
442254	2011 PL_{2}	—	December 20, 2004	Mount Lemmon	Mount Lemmon Survey	·	1.6 km	MPC · JPL
442255	2011 PL_{3}	—	December 4, 2008	Mount Lemmon	Mount Lemmon Survey	·	2.7 km	MPC · JPL
442256	2011 PQ_{7}	—	October 11, 2007	Catalina	CSS	critical	800 m	MPC · JPL
442257	2011 PF_{8}	—	September 15, 2007	Kitt Peak	Spacewatch	·	990 m	MPC · JPL
442258	2011 PH_{8}	—	August 6, 2011	Haleakala	Pan-STARRS 1	·	1.7 km	MPC · JPL
442259	2011 PW_{13}	—	November 21, 2008	Kitt Peak	Spacewatch	MAR	1.3 km	MPC · JPL
442260	2011 QH_{6}	—	September 3, 2007	Mount Lemmon	Mount Lemmon Survey	·	880 m	MPC · JPL
442261	2011 QA_{13}	—	December 15, 2004	Kitt Peak	Spacewatch	EUN	1.8 km	MPC · JPL
442262	2011 QR_{19}	—	February 2, 2005	Catalina	CSS	·	1.6 km	MPC · JPL
442263	2011 QN_{25}	—	October 5, 2007	Kitt Peak	Spacewatch	·	1.2 km	MPC · JPL
442264	2011 QP_{35}	—	July 12, 2010	WISE	WISE	·	3.1 km	MPC · JPL
442265	2011 QF_{38}	—	September 14, 2007	Mount Lemmon	Mount Lemmon Survey	·	1.7 km	MPC · JPL
442266	2011 QS_{39}	—	September 14, 2007	Mount Lemmon	Mount Lemmon Survey	·	1.3 km	MPC · JPL
442267	2011 QD_{40}	—	September 3, 2007	Catalina	CSS	·	840 m	MPC · JPL
442268	2011 QL_{45}	—	March 15, 2010	Kitt Peak	Spacewatch	·	1.6 km	MPC · JPL
442269	2011 QO_{51}	—	June 17, 2007	Kitt Peak	Spacewatch	·	1.4 km	MPC · JPL
442270	2011 QK_{54}	—	October 11, 2007	Mount Lemmon	Mount Lemmon Survey	(5)	1.3 km	MPC · JPL
442271	2011 QJ_{55}	—	December 4, 2007	Mount Lemmon	Mount Lemmon Survey	·	2.2 km	MPC · JPL
442272	2011 QB_{62}	—	February 17, 2010	Kitt Peak	Spacewatch	·	1.6 km	MPC · JPL
442273	2011 QX_{69}	—	November 11, 2004	Kitt Peak	Spacewatch	·	1.2 km	MPC · JPL
442274	2011 QR_{72}	—	August 1, 2011	Siding Spring	SSS	·	1.7 km	MPC · JPL
442275	2011 QR_{91}	—	October 9, 2007	Kitt Peak	Spacewatch	·	1.2 km	MPC · JPL
442276	2011 QN_{92}	—	March 9, 2005	Kitt Peak	Spacewatch	·	1.0 km	MPC · JPL
442277	2011 QH_{97}	—	September 28, 2000	Socorro	LINEAR	·	3.6 km	MPC · JPL
442278	2011 RL	—	August 8, 2007	Socorro	LINEAR	·	1.2 km	MPC · JPL
442279	2011 RS_{1}	—	October 8, 2007	Kitt Peak	Spacewatch	·	1.5 km	MPC · JPL
442280	2011 RE_{2}	—	September 14, 2007	Mount Lemmon	Mount Lemmon Survey	·	1.2 km	MPC · JPL
442281	2011 RL_{3}	—	May 1, 2009	Mount Lemmon	Mount Lemmon Survey	·	2.1 km	MPC · JPL
442282	2011 RJ_{10}	—	October 15, 2007	Kitt Peak	Spacewatch	·	1.5 km	MPC · JPL
442283	2011 RL_{10}	—	November 20, 2007	Mount Lemmon	Mount Lemmon Survey	·	1.5 km	MPC · JPL
442284	2011 RO_{15}	—	October 13, 2007	Catalina	CSS	·	1.1 km	MPC · JPL
442285	2011 SD_{1}	—	February 19, 2009	Kitt Peak	Spacewatch	EUN	1.0 km	MPC · JPL
442286	2011 SD_{3}	—	September 13, 2007	Kitt Peak	Spacewatch	·	830 m	MPC · JPL
442287	2011 SK_{7}	—	February 26, 2009	Kitt Peak	Spacewatch	·	2.0 km	MPC · JPL
442288	2011 SX_{8}	—	April 7, 2005	Kitt Peak	Spacewatch	·	2.2 km	MPC · JPL
442289	2011 SD_{12}	—	November 7, 2007	Catalina	CSS	·	1.9 km	MPC · JPL
442290	2011 SA_{15}	—	December 11, 2004	Kitt Peak	Spacewatch	·	1.3 km	MPC · JPL
442291	2011 SZ_{20}	—	December 21, 2003	Kitt Peak	Spacewatch	·	1.5 km	MPC · JPL
442292	2011 SB_{21}	—	December 18, 2004	Mount Lemmon	Mount Lemmon Survey	·	1.7 km	MPC · JPL
442293	2011 SL_{23}	—	March 2, 2009	Mount Lemmon	Mount Lemmon Survey	·	1.7 km	MPC · JPL
442294	2011 SU_{24}	—	September 20, 2011	Catalina	CSS	·	2.8 km	MPC · JPL
442295	2011 SY_{25}	—	October 1, 2003	Kitt Peak	Spacewatch	·	1.5 km	MPC · JPL
442296	2011 SJ_{30}	—	October 20, 2007	Mount Lemmon	Mount Lemmon Survey	(5)	970 m	MPC · JPL
442297	2011 SJ_{36}	—	May 14, 2010	Mount Lemmon	Mount Lemmon Survey	·	1.6 km	MPC · JPL
442298	2011 SQ_{40}	—	November 19, 2007	Mount Lemmon	Mount Lemmon Survey	·	2.5 km	MPC · JPL
442299	2011 SR_{45}	—	April 5, 2010	Kitt Peak	Spacewatch	·	860 m	MPC · JPL
442300	2011 SX_{51}	—	October 13, 1998	Kitt Peak	Spacewatch	·	1.6 km	MPC · JPL

== 442301–442400 ==
back to top

Designation			Discovery			Properties		Ref
Permanent	Provisional	Named after	Date	Site	Discoverer(s)	Category	Diam.	Ref
442301	2011 SF_{54}	—	January 11, 2008	Kitt Peak	Spacewatch	·	3.3 km	MPC · JPL
442302	2011 SB_{57}	—	September 13, 2005	Kitt Peak	Spacewatch	·	2.4 km	MPC · JPL
442303	2011 SO_{57}	—	September 23, 2011	Mount Lemmon	Mount Lemmon Survey	(5)	1.2 km	MPC · JPL
442304	2011 SS_{59}	—	October 20, 2007	Catalina	CSS	(5)	970 m	MPC · JPL
442305	2011 SF_{60}	—	September 20, 2007	Catalina	CSS	·	1.3 km	MPC · JPL
442306	2011 SN_{62}	—	October 25, 2003	Kitt Peak	Spacewatch	EUN	1.3 km	MPC · JPL
442307	2011 SC_{67}	—	September 22, 2011	Kitt Peak	Spacewatch	·	1.9 km	MPC · JPL
442308	2011 SC_{72}	—	May 5, 2010	Mount Lemmon	Mount Lemmon Survey	·	3.2 km	MPC · JPL
442309	2011 SC_{73}	—	July 3, 2010	WISE	WISE	KON	2.2 km	MPC · JPL
442310	2011 SX_{78}	—	October 6, 2007	Kitt Peak	Spacewatch	·	1.3 km	MPC · JPL
442311	2011 SK_{79}	—	March 15, 2010	Mount Lemmon	Mount Lemmon Survey	EUN	1.1 km	MPC · JPL
442312	2011 SL_{96}	—	August 11, 2002	Socorro	LINEAR	EUN	1.7 km	MPC · JPL
442313	2011 SG_{97}	—	September 20, 2011	Kitt Peak	Spacewatch	·	1.3 km	MPC · JPL
442314	2011 SS_{100}	—	May 9, 2005	Mount Lemmon	Mount Lemmon Survey	·	1.8 km	MPC · JPL
442315	2011 SO_{105}	—	October 16, 2007	Catalina	CSS	·	840 m	MPC · JPL
442316	2011 SM_{111}	—	May 26, 2006	Mount Lemmon	Mount Lemmon Survey	·	2.3 km	MPC · JPL
442317	2011 SA_{115}	—	September 20, 2011	Catalina	CSS	(1547)	1.8 km	MPC · JPL
442318	2011 SW_{118}	—	June 19, 2010	Mount Lemmon	Mount Lemmon Survey	·	2.2 km	MPC · JPL
442319	2011 SF_{121}	—	October 16, 1977	Palomar	C. J. van Houten, I. van Houten-Groeneveld, T. Gehrels	·	1.1 km	MPC · JPL
442320	2011 SH_{126}	—	September 20, 2011	Kitt Peak	Spacewatch	HOF	2.6 km	MPC · JPL
442321	2011 SA_{129}	—	June 8, 2002	Socorro	LINEAR	·	1.0 km	MPC · JPL
442322	2011 SZ_{129}	—	December 17, 2007	Mount Lemmon	Mount Lemmon Survey	·	1.6 km	MPC · JPL
442323	2011 SM_{132}	—	September 23, 2011	Kitt Peak	Spacewatch	·	1.8 km	MPC · JPL
442324	2011 SP_{133}	—	March 25, 2010	Mount Lemmon	Mount Lemmon Survey	·	2.2 km	MPC · JPL
442325	2011 SY_{133}	—	November 7, 2007	Kitt Peak	Spacewatch	·	1.2 km	MPC · JPL
442326	2011 SR_{134}	—	November 4, 2007	Siding Spring	SSS	·	1.7 km	MPC · JPL
442327	2011 SO_{144}	—	December 30, 2007	Mount Lemmon	Mount Lemmon Survey	·	2.1 km	MPC · JPL
442328	2011 SQ_{144}	—	November 9, 2007	Kitt Peak	Spacewatch	·	1.3 km	MPC · JPL
442329	2011 SY_{159}	—	October 21, 2007	Mount Lemmon	Mount Lemmon Survey	(5)	1.5 km	MPC · JPL
442330	2011 SY_{162}	—	September 23, 2011	Kitt Peak	Spacewatch	·	1.6 km	MPC · JPL
442331	2011 SD_{163}	—	May 13, 1996	Kitt Peak	Spacewatch	·	2.5 km	MPC · JPL
442332	2011 SK_{166}	—	September 26, 2011	Kitt Peak	Spacewatch	NEM	2.0 km	MPC · JPL
442333	2011 SX_{173}	—	September 25, 2007	Mount Lemmon	Mount Lemmon Survey	(5)	1.0 km	MPC · JPL
442334	2011 SU_{174}	—	September 20, 2011	Kitt Peak	Spacewatch	·	1.4 km	MPC · JPL
442335	2011 SJ_{175}	—	December 16, 2007	Catalina	CSS	·	1.6 km	MPC · JPL
442336	2011 SN_{177}	—	September 28, 2011	Kitt Peak	Spacewatch	·	1.3 km	MPC · JPL
442337	2011 SN_{178}	—	September 22, 2011	Kitt Peak	Spacewatch	·	1.2 km	MPC · JPL
442338	2011 SK_{179}	—	October 2, 1997	Caussols	ODAS	·	2.5 km	MPC · JPL
442339	2011 SR_{179}	—	September 26, 2011	Kitt Peak	Spacewatch	·	1.7 km	MPC · JPL
442340	2011 SP_{183}	—	May 11, 2005	Mount Lemmon	Mount Lemmon Survey	·	1.7 km	MPC · JPL
442341	2011 SB_{193}	—	November 5, 2007	Mount Lemmon	Mount Lemmon Survey	·	980 m	MPC · JPL
442342	2011 SR_{202}	—	September 14, 2007	Mount Lemmon	Mount Lemmon Survey	EUN	920 m	MPC · JPL
442343	2011 SR_{207}	—	October 12, 2007	Socorro	LINEAR	·	1.2 km	MPC · JPL
442344	2011 SW_{207}	—	September 9, 2007	Kitt Peak	Spacewatch	KON	1.9 km	MPC · JPL
442345	2011 SZ_{207}	—	October 12, 2007	Mount Lemmon	Mount Lemmon Survey	NYS	1.2 km	MPC · JPL
442346	2011 SW_{208}	—	November 18, 2007	Mount Lemmon	Mount Lemmon Survey	·	1.1 km	MPC · JPL
442347	2011 SF_{209}	—	October 15, 2007	Mount Lemmon	Mount Lemmon Survey	(5)	1.1 km	MPC · JPL
442348	2011 ST_{212}	—	January 1, 2009	Kitt Peak	Spacewatch	MAR	880 m	MPC · JPL
442349	2011 SH_{221}	—	October 12, 2007	Mount Lemmon	Mount Lemmon Survey	(5)	980 m	MPC · JPL
442350	2011 SJ_{224}	—	September 28, 2011	Mount Lemmon	Mount Lemmon Survey	·	2.3 km	MPC · JPL
442351	2011 SF_{228}	—	November 5, 2007	Kitt Peak	Spacewatch	(5)	1.0 km	MPC · JPL
442352	2011 SP_{228}	—	March 11, 2005	Mount Lemmon	Mount Lemmon Survey	·	1.7 km	MPC · JPL
442353	2011 SF_{229}	—	August 16, 2002	Haleakala	NEAT	·	1.3 km	MPC · JPL
442354	2011 SW_{229}	—	October 14, 2007	Catalina	CSS	EUN	1.3 km	MPC · JPL
442355	2011 SE_{230}	—	September 8, 2011	Kitt Peak	Spacewatch	·	1.9 km	MPC · JPL
442356	2011 SG_{230}	—	October 15, 2007	Mount Lemmon	Mount Lemmon Survey	(5)	920 m	MPC · JPL
442357	2011 SV_{230}	—	January 13, 2008	Mount Lemmon	Mount Lemmon Survey	·	1.8 km	MPC · JPL
442358	2011 SL_{231}	—	March 4, 2005	Kitt Peak	Spacewatch	·	1.8 km	MPC · JPL
442359	2011 SC_{233}	—	July 3, 2011	Mount Lemmon	Mount Lemmon Survey	·	1.5 km	MPC · JPL
442360	2011 SR_{233}	—	October 28, 1994	Kitt Peak	Spacewatch	·	810 m	MPC · JPL
442361	2011 SD_{234}	—	February 3, 2000	Kitt Peak	Spacewatch	·	1.6 km	MPC · JPL
442362	2011 ST_{241}	—	January 17, 2004	Kitt Peak	Spacewatch	·	1.4 km	MPC · JPL
442363	2011 SN_{245}	—	October 20, 2007	Mount Lemmon	Mount Lemmon Survey	RAF	760 m	MPC · JPL
442364	2011 SD_{250}	—	January 13, 1996	Kitt Peak	Spacewatch	·	840 m	MPC · JPL
442365	2011 SJ_{250}	—	April 26, 2006	Kitt Peak	Spacewatch	·	1.3 km	MPC · JPL
442366	2011 SP_{250}	—	November 18, 2007	Mount Lemmon	Mount Lemmon Survey	·	1.5 km	MPC · JPL
442367	2011 SD_{256}	—	September 14, 1998	Kitt Peak	Spacewatch	·	1.1 km	MPC · JPL
442368	2011 SO_{256}	—	September 12, 1998	Kitt Peak	Spacewatch	·	2.4 km	MPC · JPL
442369	2011 SB_{257}	—	December 31, 2007	Mount Lemmon	Mount Lemmon Survey	·	1.5 km	MPC · JPL
442370	2011 SJ_{259}	—	September 26, 2011	Kitt Peak	Spacewatch	·	2.8 km	MPC · JPL
442371	2011 SS_{272}	—	November 12, 2004	Catalina	CSS	·	1.2 km	MPC · JPL
442372	2011 SF_{273}	—	December 20, 2004	Mount Lemmon	Mount Lemmon Survey	(5)	1.4 km	MPC · JPL
442373	2011 SW_{273}	—	January 13, 2008	Mount Lemmon	Mount Lemmon Survey	DOR	2.4 km	MPC · JPL
442374	2011 TS_{2}	—	November 2, 2007	Kitt Peak	Spacewatch	(5)	1.2 km	MPC · JPL
442375	2011 TY_{2}	—	November 9, 2007	Kitt Peak	Spacewatch	·	1.1 km	MPC · JPL
442376	2011 TJ_{3}	—	February 16, 2004	Kitt Peak	Spacewatch	·	1.3 km	MPC · JPL
442377	2011 TB_{5}	—	December 3, 2007	Kitt Peak	Spacewatch	·	1.4 km	MPC · JPL
442378	2011 TK_{17}	—	December 4, 2007	Mount Lemmon	Mount Lemmon Survey	·	1.9 km	MPC · JPL
442379	2011 UQ_{1}	—	May 4, 2005	Mount Lemmon	Mount Lemmon Survey	·	2.0 km	MPC · JPL
442380	2011 UH_{3}	—	January 19, 2008	Mount Lemmon	Mount Lemmon Survey	·	1.4 km	MPC · JPL
442381	2011 UA_{9}	—	April 30, 2006	Kitt Peak	Spacewatch	·	1.4 km	MPC · JPL
442382	2011 UF_{13}	—	September 21, 2011	Kitt Peak	Spacewatch	·	2.2 km	MPC · JPL
442383	2011 US_{16}	—	December 18, 2007	Mount Lemmon	Mount Lemmon Survey	AEO	1.2 km	MPC · JPL
442384	2011 UA_{19}	—	January 12, 2008	Kitt Peak	Spacewatch	·	1.8 km	MPC · JPL
442385	2011 UD_{22}	—	July 25, 2006	Mount Lemmon	Mount Lemmon Survey	·	2.0 km	MPC · JPL
442386	2011 UB_{24}	—	September 29, 2011	Kitt Peak	Spacewatch	MIS	2.2 km	MPC · JPL
442387	2011 UR_{25}	—	April 24, 2009	Mount Lemmon	Mount Lemmon Survey	·	1.7 km	MPC · JPL
442388	2011 UX_{26}	—	December 18, 2003	Kitt Peak	Spacewatch	·	1.2 km	MPC · JPL
442389	2011 UH_{27}	—	October 17, 2011	Kitt Peak	Spacewatch	·	1.5 km	MPC · JPL
442390	2011 UJ_{30}	—	October 18, 2011	Mount Lemmon	Mount Lemmon Survey	·	2.0 km	MPC · JPL
442391	2011 UY_{35}	—	November 7, 2002	Kitt Peak	Spacewatch	·	1.6 km	MPC · JPL
442392	2011 UL_{37}	—	April 30, 2006	Kitt Peak	Spacewatch	·	3.4 km	MPC · JPL
442393	2011 UT_{39}	—	September 20, 2011	Catalina	CSS	EUN	1.1 km	MPC · JPL
442394	2011 UR_{41}	—	September 21, 2011	Kitt Peak	Spacewatch	·	1.9 km	MPC · JPL
442395	2011 UC_{42}	—	September 21, 2011	Kitt Peak	Spacewatch	·	1.7 km	MPC · JPL
442396	2011 UK_{44}	—	September 18, 2006	Catalina	CSS	·	2.2 km	MPC · JPL
442397	2011 UV_{44}	—	August 28, 2006	Kitt Peak	Spacewatch	AGN	1.0 km	MPC · JPL
442398	2011 UA_{48}	—	October 18, 2011	Kitt Peak	Spacewatch	·	1.4 km	MPC · JPL
442399	2011 UL_{49}	—	January 13, 2008	Mount Lemmon	Mount Lemmon Survey	·	1.6 km	MPC · JPL
442400	2011 UQ_{54}	—	December 30, 2007	Mount Lemmon	Mount Lemmon Survey	(11882)	1.5 km	MPC · JPL

== 442401–442500 ==
back to top

Designation			Discovery			Properties		Ref
Permanent	Provisional	Named after	Date	Site	Discoverer(s)	Category	Diam.	Ref
442401	2011 UP_{56}	—	October 18, 2011	Mount Lemmon	Mount Lemmon Survey	·	2.1 km	MPC · JPL
442402	2011 UF_{57}	—	September 28, 2011	Kitt Peak	Spacewatch	·	1.4 km	MPC · JPL
442403	2011 UQ_{58}	—	September 28, 2011	Kitt Peak	Spacewatch	·	1.6 km	MPC · JPL
442404	2011 UG_{66}	—	April 7, 2005	Kitt Peak	Spacewatch	·	1.6 km	MPC · JPL
442405	2011 UO_{67}	—	October 21, 2007	Kitt Peak	Spacewatch	·	1.0 km	MPC · JPL
442406	2011 UT_{72}	—	March 17, 2009	Kitt Peak	Spacewatch	·	1.6 km	MPC · JPL
442407	2011 UH_{76}	—	December 4, 2007	Mount Lemmon	Mount Lemmon Survey	·	1.7 km	MPC · JPL
442408	2011 UG_{81}	—	August 21, 2006	Kitt Peak	Spacewatch	·	1.7 km	MPC · JPL
442409	2011 UJ_{81}	—	September 30, 2006	Mount Lemmon	Mount Lemmon Survey	·	1.8 km	MPC · JPL
442410	2011 UF_{88}	—	October 21, 2011	Mount Lemmon	Mount Lemmon Survey	·	2.8 km	MPC · JPL
442411	2011 UL_{98}	—	October 20, 2011	Kitt Peak	Spacewatch	·	3.2 km	MPC · JPL
442412	2011 UL_{102}	—	September 28, 2006	Kitt Peak	Spacewatch	·	1.6 km	MPC · JPL
442413	2011 UJ_{104}	—	September 22, 2011	Kitt Peak	Spacewatch	·	1.5 km	MPC · JPL
442414	2011 UZ_{106}	—	October 18, 2011	Catalina	CSS	·	1.9 km	MPC · JPL
442415	2011 UH_{108}	—	October 23, 2011	Socorro	LINEAR	·	2.1 km	MPC · JPL
442416	2011 UV_{111}	—	October 1, 2011	Kitt Peak	Spacewatch	·	2.1 km	MPC · JPL
442417	2011 UX_{112}	—	April 28, 2010	WISE	WISE	·	3.7 km	MPC · JPL
442418	2011 UP_{117}	—	October 19, 2007	Mount Lemmon	Mount Lemmon Survey	·	1.1 km	MPC · JPL
442419	2011 US_{117}	—	September 10, 2007	Mount Lemmon	Mount Lemmon Survey	EUN	900 m	MPC · JPL
442420	2011 UR_{120}	—	September 30, 2011	Kitt Peak	Spacewatch	·	2.9 km	MPC · JPL
442421	2011 UN_{125}	—	March 27, 2000	Kitt Peak	Spacewatch	·	1.8 km	MPC · JPL
442422	2011 UU_{125}	—	September 23, 2011	Kitt Peak	Spacewatch	MAR	1.6 km	MPC · JPL
442423	2011 UE_{126}	—	October 20, 2011	Kitt Peak	Spacewatch	WIT	1.1 km	MPC · JPL
442424	2011 UA_{129}	—	December 16, 2007	Mount Lemmon	Mount Lemmon Survey	·	2.3 km	MPC · JPL
442425	2011 UE_{130}	—	April 1, 2005	Kitt Peak	Spacewatch	MRX	970 m	MPC · JPL
442426	2011 US_{130}	—	January 5, 2000	Kitt Peak	Spacewatch	MAR	1.1 km	MPC · JPL
442427	2011 UV_{131}	—	October 20, 2011	Kitt Peak	Spacewatch	·	1.2 km	MPC · JPL
442428	2011 UW_{135}	—	September 28, 1998	Kitt Peak	Spacewatch	MIS	1.9 km	MPC · JPL
442429	2011 UX_{138}	—	August 21, 2006	Kitt Peak	Spacewatch	·	1.6 km	MPC · JPL
442430	2011 UE_{139}	—	February 8, 1999	Mauna Kea	C. Veillet, J. Anderson	·	1.4 km	MPC · JPL
442431	2011 UJ_{142}	—	December 4, 2007	Mount Lemmon	Mount Lemmon Survey	·	1.6 km	MPC · JPL
442432	2011 UL_{144}	—	September 15, 2006	Kitt Peak	Spacewatch	·	1.4 km	MPC · JPL
442433	2011 UV_{144}	—	November 21, 2005	Catalina	CSS	·	3.4 km	MPC · JPL
442434	2011 UV_{148}	—	October 3, 2002	Socorro	LINEAR	·	1.4 km	MPC · JPL
442435	2011 UC_{150}	—	August 15, 2002	Palomar	NEAT	EUN	990 m	MPC · JPL
442436	2011 UE_{157}	—	February 13, 2008	Kitt Peak	Spacewatch	·	1.5 km	MPC · JPL
442437	2011 US_{157}	—	November 5, 2007	Mount Lemmon	Mount Lemmon Survey	·	1.2 km	MPC · JPL
442438	2011 UC_{158}	—	November 25, 2005	Kitt Peak	Spacewatch	T_{j} (2.95)	4.1 km	MPC · JPL
442439	2011 UU_{159}	—	November 28, 1994	Kitt Peak	Spacewatch	·	1.5 km	MPC · JPL
442440	2011 UO_{162}	—	October 24, 2011	Mount Lemmon	Mount Lemmon Survey	·	1.6 km	MPC · JPL
442441	2011 UC_{164}	—	September 6, 2002	Socorro	LINEAR	·	1.3 km	MPC · JPL
442442	2011 UD_{169}	—	April 2, 2006	Kitt Peak	Spacewatch	·	1.4 km	MPC · JPL
442443	2011 UZ_{186}	—	November 2, 2007	Mount Lemmon	Mount Lemmon Survey	·	1.2 km	MPC · JPL
442444	2011 UK_{189}	—	November 2, 2007	Kitt Peak	Spacewatch	(5)	1.1 km	MPC · JPL
442445	2011 UR_{194}	—	November 4, 2007	Kitt Peak	Spacewatch	(5)	1.2 km	MPC · JPL
442446	2011 UX_{194}	—	March 1, 2008	Kitt Peak	Spacewatch	·	3.1 km	MPC · JPL
442447	2011 UG_{197}	—	November 15, 2006	Kitt Peak	Spacewatch	EOS	1.8 km	MPC · JPL
442448	2011 UT_{200}	—	September 26, 2011	Kitt Peak	Spacewatch	·	2.5 km	MPC · JPL
442449	2011 UR_{208}	—	May 16, 2010	Mount Lemmon	Mount Lemmon Survey	·	2.5 km	MPC · JPL
442450	2011 UQ_{228}	—	September 26, 2006	Kitt Peak	Spacewatch	KOR	1 km	MPC · JPL
442451	2011 US_{228}	—	September 21, 2011	Kitt Peak	Spacewatch	·	1.1 km	MPC · JPL
442452	2011 UV_{233}	—	March 2, 2009	Mount Lemmon	Mount Lemmon Survey	·	1.7 km	MPC · JPL
442453	2011 UX_{234}	—	October 19, 2011	Kitt Peak	Spacewatch	·	1.9 km	MPC · JPL
442454	2011 UZ_{235}	—	November 11, 2006	Kitt Peak	Spacewatch	·	1.4 km	MPC · JPL
442455	2011 UP_{243}	—	October 26, 1994	Kitt Peak	Spacewatch	·	890 m	MPC · JPL
442456	2011 UY_{246}	—	March 23, 2004	Socorro	LINEAR	·	2.8 km	MPC · JPL
442457	2011 UY_{253}	—	November 2, 2007	Kitt Peak	Spacewatch	(5)	1.2 km	MPC · JPL
442458	2011 UP_{254}	—	September 21, 2011	Mount Lemmon	Mount Lemmon Survey	GEF	1.1 km	MPC · JPL
442459	2011 UU_{255}	—	November 7, 2007	Catalina	CSS	·	1.7 km	MPC · JPL
442460	2011 UW_{263}	—	October 18, 2011	Catalina	CSS	·	2.2 km	MPC · JPL
442461	2011 UJ_{266}	—	October 21, 2011	Mount Lemmon	Mount Lemmon Survey	·	1.3 km	MPC · JPL
442462	2011 UO_{268}	—	September 29, 2011	Mount Lemmon	Mount Lemmon Survey	·	2.3 km	MPC · JPL
442463	2011 UJ_{274}	—	December 4, 2007	Kitt Peak	Spacewatch	·	1.8 km	MPC · JPL
442464	2011 US_{274}	—	February 4, 2000	Kitt Peak	Spacewatch	·	1.2 km	MPC · JPL
442465	2011 UA_{281}	—	September 29, 2005	Siding Spring	SSS	·	5.4 km	MPC · JPL
442466	2011 UW_{285}	—	February 20, 2009	Kitt Peak	Spacewatch	KOR	1.3 km	MPC · JPL
442467	2011 UY_{290}	—	November 8, 2007	Mount Lemmon	Mount Lemmon Survey	·	1.4 km	MPC · JPL
442468	2011 UK_{296}	—	September 23, 2011	Kitt Peak	Spacewatch	·	1.9 km	MPC · JPL
442469	2011 UZ_{297}	—	September 30, 2006	Mount Lemmon	Mount Lemmon Survey	KOR	1.4 km	MPC · JPL
442470	2011 UX_{298}	—	October 21, 2011	Kitt Peak	Spacewatch	EOS	2.0 km	MPC · JPL
442471	2011 UM_{300}	—	December 17, 2006	Mount Lemmon	Mount Lemmon Survey	EOS	1.7 km	MPC · JPL
442472	2011 UY_{303}	—	April 20, 2009	Kitt Peak	Spacewatch	HOF	2.4 km	MPC · JPL
442473	2011 US_{305}	—	June 22, 2010	Mount Lemmon	Mount Lemmon Survey	·	3.8 km	MPC · JPL
442474	2011 UD_{309}	—	August 28, 2006	Kitt Peak	Spacewatch	·	1.5 km	MPC · JPL
442475	2011 UR_{309}	—	September 24, 2011	Catalina	CSS	·	2.2 km	MPC · JPL
442476	2011 UE_{314}	—	January 11, 2008	Catalina	CSS	·	2.7 km	MPC · JPL
442477	2011 UG_{314}	—	October 21, 2006	Mount Lemmon	Mount Lemmon Survey	·	1.7 km	MPC · JPL
442478	2011 UU_{320}	—	March 3, 2009	Kitt Peak	Spacewatch	·	1.8 km	MPC · JPL
442479	2011 UH_{321}	—	October 24, 2011	Catalina	CSS	·	2.4 km	MPC · JPL
442480	2011 UM_{326}	—	September 18, 2007	Mount Lemmon	Mount Lemmon Survey	·	2.4 km	MPC · JPL
442481	2011 UA_{336}	—	December 3, 2007	Kitt Peak	Spacewatch	·	1.6 km	MPC · JPL
442482	2011 UH_{347}	—	September 8, 2000	Kitt Peak	Spacewatch	EOS	1.9 km	MPC · JPL
442483	2011 UO_{351}	—	November 2, 2007	Mount Lemmon	Mount Lemmon Survey	·	1.9 km	MPC · JPL
442484	2011 UN_{362}	—	October 21, 2011	Mount Lemmon	Mount Lemmon Survey	·	2.1 km	MPC · JPL
442485	2011 UW_{369}	—	September 25, 2006	Kitt Peak	Spacewatch	AGN	1 km	MPC · JPL
442486	2011 UH_{387}	—	September 27, 2006	Catalina	CSS	·	2.7 km	MPC · JPL
442487	2011 UJ_{391}	—	September 23, 2011	Catalina	CSS	·	1.8 km	MPC · JPL
442488	2011 UR_{391}	—	November 5, 2007	Mount Lemmon	Mount Lemmon Survey	EUN	1.2 km	MPC · JPL
442489	2011 UA_{397}	—	October 18, 2003	Kitt Peak	Spacewatch	·	1.3 km	MPC · JPL
442490	2011 VV	—	September 30, 2011	Kitt Peak	Spacewatch	·	1.8 km	MPC · JPL
442491	2011 VT_{1}	—	May 24, 2000	Kitt Peak	Spacewatch	·	2.4 km	MPC · JPL
442492	2011 VY_{3}	—	July 3, 2011	Mount Lemmon	Mount Lemmon Survey	·	1.6 km	MPC · JPL
442493	2011 VB_{9}	—	May 8, 2006	Kitt Peak	Spacewatch	·	2.5 km	MPC · JPL
442494	2011 VL_{12}	—	October 21, 2011	Mount Lemmon	Mount Lemmon Survey	EOS	1.6 km	MPC · JPL
442495	2011 VN_{18}	—	July 26, 2006	Siding Spring	SSS	·	2.0 km	MPC · JPL
442496	2011 VY_{18}	—	April 19, 2009	Mount Lemmon	Mount Lemmon Survey	·	1.6 km	MPC · JPL
442497	2011 VK_{19}	—	October 18, 2011	Kitt Peak	Spacewatch	·	1.7 km	MPC · JPL
442498	2011 VJ_{22}	—	September 17, 2006	Kitt Peak	Spacewatch	·	1.8 km	MPC · JPL
442499	2011 VO_{22}	—	November 8, 2007	Kitt Peak	Spacewatch	·	1.3 km	MPC · JPL
442500	2011 WG_{2}	—	April 6, 2008	Mount Lemmon	Mount Lemmon Survey	ULA · CYB	4.7 km	MPC · JPL

== 442501–442600 ==
back to top

Designation			Discovery			Properties		Ref
Permanent	Provisional	Named after	Date	Site	Discoverer(s)	Category	Diam.	Ref
442501	2011 WX_{8}	—	November 3, 2011	Kitt Peak	Spacewatch	·	1.9 km	MPC · JPL
442502	2011 WJ_{14}	—	September 23, 2006	Kitt Peak	Spacewatch	·	1.7 km	MPC · JPL
442503	2011 WK_{16}	—	November 16, 2011	Kitt Peak	Spacewatch	·	1.9 km	MPC · JPL
442504	2011 WA_{20}	—	November 17, 2011	Mount Lemmon	Mount Lemmon Survey	·	2.8 km	MPC · JPL
442505	2011 WP_{21}	—	October 11, 2006	Kitt Peak	Spacewatch	WIT	910 m	MPC · JPL
442506	2011 WJ_{22}	—	November 20, 2006	Kitt Peak	Spacewatch	·	1.4 km	MPC · JPL
442507	2011 WN_{29}	—	September 22, 2001	Kitt Peak	Spacewatch	·	1.4 km	MPC · JPL
442508	2011 WA_{42}	—	October 27, 2011	Catalina	CSS	EUN	1.3 km	MPC · JPL
442509	2011 WH_{47}	—	December 5, 2007	Kitt Peak	Spacewatch	·	1.6 km	MPC · JPL
442510	2011 WB_{48}	—	September 26, 2006	Mount Lemmon	Mount Lemmon Survey	·	1.5 km	MPC · JPL
442511	2011 WF_{61}	—	December 14, 2007	Mount Lemmon	Mount Lemmon Survey	·	1.6 km	MPC · JPL
442512	2011 WQ_{65}	—	June 24, 2010	WISE	WISE	·	3.2 km	MPC · JPL
442513	2011 WZ_{66}	—	December 19, 2007	Mount Lemmon	Mount Lemmon Survey	·	1.3 km	MPC · JPL
442514	2011 WR_{75}	—	September 16, 2006	Catalina	CSS	·	2.3 km	MPC · JPL
442515	2011 WR_{78}	—	January 18, 2008	Mount Lemmon	Mount Lemmon Survey	·	1.2 km	MPC · JPL
442516	2011 WE_{79}	—	October 23, 2011	Kitt Peak	Spacewatch	EOS	1.9 km	MPC · JPL
442517	2011 WM_{83}	—	May 8, 2010	WISE	WISE	·	3.1 km	MPC · JPL
442518	2011 WM_{85}	—	February 8, 2008	Kitt Peak	Spacewatch	AGN	1.2 km	MPC · JPL
442519	2011 WN_{87}	—	December 14, 2006	Kitt Peak	Spacewatch	·	1.3 km	MPC · JPL
442520	2011 WU_{87}	—	December 13, 2006	Mount Lemmon	Mount Lemmon Survey	·	1.5 km	MPC · JPL
442521	2011 WK_{91}	—	December 11, 2002	Socorro	LINEAR	CLO	2.6 km	MPC · JPL
442522	2011 WZ_{91}	—	December 6, 2002	Socorro	LINEAR	·	1.5 km	MPC · JPL
442523	2011 WU_{95}	—	November 30, 2011	Kitt Peak	Spacewatch	APO · PHA	450 m	MPC · JPL
442524	2011 WV_{97}	—	November 24, 2011	Haleakala	Pan-STARRS 1	EOS	2.2 km	MPC · JPL
442525	2011 WR_{103}	—	October 1, 2011	Mount Lemmon	Mount Lemmon Survey	·	2.6 km	MPC · JPL
442526	2011 WG_{104}	—	February 2, 2008	Kitt Peak	Spacewatch	·	2.4 km	MPC · JPL
442527	2011 WH_{106}	—	November 17, 2011	Kitt Peak	Spacewatch	·	2.1 km	MPC · JPL
442528	2011 WB_{109}	—	February 14, 2008	Mount Lemmon	Mount Lemmon Survey	EOS	1.9 km	MPC · JPL
442529	2011 WT_{121}	—	November 28, 2006	Mount Lemmon	Mount Lemmon Survey	fast	2.3 km	MPC · JPL
442530	2011 WM_{125}	—	November 17, 2006	Kitt Peak	Spacewatch	·	2.0 km	MPC · JPL
442531	2011 WG_{126}	—	October 18, 2011	Kitt Peak	Spacewatch	EOS	1.8 km	MPC · JPL
442532	2011 WC_{127}	—	September 28, 2006	Kitt Peak	Spacewatch	HOF	2.3 km	MPC · JPL
442533	2011 WO_{133}	—	May 27, 2006	Catalina	CSS	·	2.1 km	MPC · JPL
442534	2011 WG_{134}	—	July 2, 2005	Kitt Peak	Spacewatch	·	1.9 km	MPC · JPL
442535	2011 WA_{138}	—	December 17, 2007	Kitt Peak	Spacewatch	AGN	960 m	MPC · JPL
442536	2011 WB_{146}	—	August 26, 1998	Kitt Peak	Spacewatch	·	1.3 km	MPC · JPL
442537	2011 WE_{151}	—	January 27, 2007	Kitt Peak	Spacewatch	·	2.9 km	MPC · JPL
442538	2011 WJ_{151}	—	April 9, 2010	WISE	WISE	·	2.6 km	MPC · JPL
442539	2011 YM_{9}	—	June 12, 2010	WISE	WISE	·	2.5 km	MPC · JPL
442540	2011 YR_{12}	—	May 10, 2010	WISE	WISE	·	2.0 km	MPC · JPL
442541	2011 YQ_{13}	—	August 11, 2004	Siding Spring	SSS	·	3.9 km	MPC · JPL
442542	2011 YW_{13}	—	September 30, 2005	Kitt Peak	Spacewatch	·	2.2 km	MPC · JPL
442543	2011 YV_{31}	—	November 23, 2006	Mount Lemmon	Mount Lemmon Survey	·	3.6 km	MPC · JPL
442544	2011 YE_{33}	—	June 14, 2010	WISE	WISE	·	3.1 km	MPC · JPL
442545	2011 YZ_{33}	—	November 4, 2010	Mount Lemmon	Mount Lemmon Survey	·	4.0 km	MPC · JPL
442546	2011 YE_{34}	—	December 5, 2005	Kitt Peak	Spacewatch	·	2.9 km	MPC · JPL
442547	2011 YQ_{39}	—	June 17, 2010	Catalina	CSS	·	680 m	MPC · JPL
442548	2011 YR_{42}	—	June 22, 2010	WISE	WISE	·	2.6 km	MPC · JPL
442549	2011 YA_{45}	—	December 6, 2005	Kitt Peak	Spacewatch	·	3.8 km	MPC · JPL
442550	2011 YT_{56}	—	January 24, 2007	Mount Lemmon	Mount Lemmon Survey	·	1.6 km	MPC · JPL
442551	2011 YO_{59}	—	July 12, 2010	WISE	WISE	·	3.0 km	MPC · JPL
442552	2011 YP_{60}	—	October 16, 2006	Catalina	CSS	·	2.3 km	MPC · JPL
442553	2011 YX_{69}	—	December 24, 2011	Mount Lemmon	Mount Lemmon Survey	EOS	2.0 km	MPC · JPL
442554	2011 YW_{78}	—	February 17, 2007	Mount Lemmon	Mount Lemmon Survey	·	2.9 km	MPC · JPL
442555	2012 AB_{6}	—	January 27, 2007	Kitt Peak	Spacewatch	·	2.3 km	MPC · JPL
442556	2012 AH_{7}	—	February 26, 2007	Mount Lemmon	Mount Lemmon Survey	·	3.0 km	MPC · JPL
442557	2012 AH_{8}	—	October 29, 2005	Mount Lemmon	Mount Lemmon Survey	·	2.5 km	MPC · JPL
442558	2012 AU_{8}	—	January 2, 2012	Kitt Peak	Spacewatch	VER	2.6 km	MPC · JPL
442559	2012 AU_{10}	—	January 11, 2012	Mount Lemmon	Mount Lemmon Survey	AMO +1km	820 m	MPC · JPL
442560	2012 AR_{14}	—	December 3, 2000	Kitt Peak	Spacewatch	·	3.4 km	MPC · JPL
442561	2012 AK_{15}	—	August 25, 2004	Kitt Peak	Spacewatch	·	4.2 km	MPC · JPL
442562	2012 AL_{16}	—	December 4, 1999	Kitt Peak	Spacewatch	·	3.0 km	MPC · JPL
442563	2012 AD_{17}	—	February 19, 2001	Socorro	LINEAR	·	3.2 km	MPC · JPL
442564	2012 AP_{18}	—	December 5, 2002	Socorro	LINEAR	·	3.1 km	MPC · JPL
442565	2012 AX_{23}	—	October 30, 2010	Mount Lemmon	Mount Lemmon Survey	3:2	7.4 km	MPC · JPL
442566	2012 BL_{6}	—	December 30, 2011	Kitt Peak	Spacewatch	·	2.7 km	MPC · JPL
442567	2012 BU_{11}	—	September 10, 2004	Socorro	LINEAR	·	4.5 km	MPC · JPL
442568	2012 BO_{21}	—	November 11, 2010	Catalina	CSS	·	3.0 km	MPC · JPL
442569	2012 BN_{22}	—	October 29, 2005	Catalina	CSS	EMA	3.0 km	MPC · JPL
442570	2012 BG_{30}	—	July 15, 2010	WISE	WISE	·	3.0 km	MPC · JPL
442571	2012 BW_{32}	—	September 13, 2004	Kitt Peak	Spacewatch	T_{j} (2.99)	4.2 km	MPC · JPL
442572	2012 BP_{49}	—	December 17, 2006	Mount Lemmon	Mount Lemmon Survey	·	2.1 km	MPC · JPL
442573	2012 BP_{73}	—	February 8, 2007	Kitt Peak	Spacewatch	·	2.6 km	MPC · JPL
442574	2012 BH_{74}	—	February 20, 2002	Kitt Peak	Spacewatch	·	2.2 km	MPC · JPL
442575	2012 BC_{79}	—	February 19, 2001	Socorro	LINEAR	TIR	4.4 km	MPC · JPL
442576	2012 BU_{82}	—	December 10, 2005	Kitt Peak	Spacewatch	·	3.0 km	MPC · JPL
442577	2012 BA_{83}	—	November 30, 2005	Kitt Peak	Spacewatch	THM	2.1 km	MPC · JPL
442578	2012 BZ_{84}	—	November 25, 2005	Kitt Peak	Spacewatch	THM	1.8 km	MPC · JPL
442579	2012 BQ_{87}	—	July 22, 2010	WISE	WISE	URS	4.4 km	MPC · JPL
442580	2012 BV_{90}	—	August 12, 2010	Kitt Peak	Spacewatch	·	2.9 km	MPC · JPL
442581	2012 BU_{93}	—	July 18, 2010	WISE	WISE	·	2.1 km	MPC · JPL
442582	2012 BL_{98}	—	February 1, 2001	Anderson Mesa	LONEOS	·	2.9 km	MPC · JPL
442583	2012 BE_{102}	—	December 25, 2011	Kitt Peak	Spacewatch	·	4.1 km	MPC · JPL
442584	2012 BB_{103}	—	August 13, 2010	WISE	WISE	T_{j} (2.98)	4.0 km	MPC · JPL
442585	2012 BH_{103}	—	July 14, 2010	WISE	WISE	·	5.1 km	MPC · JPL
442586	2012 BX_{150}	—	January 12, 2008	Catalina	CSS	·	1.5 km	MPC · JPL
442587	2012 BP_{151}	—	March 16, 2007	Mount Lemmon	Mount Lemmon Survey	·	2.3 km	MPC · JPL
442588	2012 BK_{152}	—	October 20, 2004	Catalina	CSS	EOS	2.6 km	MPC · JPL
442589	2012 CZ_{7}	—	August 6, 2010	WISE	WISE	·	4.8 km	MPC · JPL
442590	2012 CV_{8}	—	September 10, 2004	Kitt Peak	Spacewatch	·	2.6 km	MPC · JPL
442591	2012 CR_{9}	—	November 2, 2005	Mount Lemmon	Mount Lemmon Survey	·	2.7 km	MPC · JPL
442592	2012 CS_{25}	—	August 6, 2010	WISE	WISE	·	5.3 km	MPC · JPL
442593	2012 CU_{33}	—	September 15, 2004	Kitt Peak	Spacewatch	·	2.4 km	MPC · JPL
442594	2012 CM_{40}	—	January 10, 1999	Kitt Peak	Spacewatch	CYB	4.0 km	MPC · JPL
442595	2012 CJ_{43}	—	October 13, 2010	Mount Lemmon	Mount Lemmon Survey	·	3.2 km	MPC · JPL
442596	2012 DT_{4}	—	November 11, 2010	Kitt Peak	Spacewatch	·	2.0 km	MPC · JPL
442597	2012 DN_{7}	—	August 8, 2010	WISE	WISE	·	3.2 km	MPC · JPL
442598	2012 DO_{9}	—	December 28, 2011	Mount Lemmon	Mount Lemmon Survey	CYB	4.7 km	MPC · JPL
442599	2012 DD_{13}	—	March 13, 2007	Kitt Peak	Spacewatch	·	4.4 km	MPC · JPL
442600	2012 DE_{24}	—	September 12, 2004	Kitt Peak	Spacewatch	·	3.0 km	MPC · JPL

== 442601–442700 ==
back to top

Designation			Discovery			Properties		Ref
Permanent	Provisional	Named after	Date	Site	Discoverer(s)	Category	Diam.	Ref
442601	2012 DC_{39}	—	February 22, 2012	Kitt Peak	Spacewatch	H	550 m	MPC · JPL
442602	2012 DE_{56}	—	June 26, 2010	WISE	WISE	T_{j} (2.99)	4.6 km	MPC · JPL
442603	2012 FC_{29}	—	March 23, 2004	Kitt Peak	Spacewatch	3:2	5.3 km	MPC · JPL
442604	2012 GR_{11}	—	December 30, 2008	Mount Lemmon	Mount Lemmon Survey	H	620 m	MPC · JPL
442605	2012 HY_{33}	—	April 27, 2012	Haleakala	Pan-STARRS 1	APO · critical	440 m	MPC · JPL
442606	2012 JM_{18}	—	November 29, 2005	Mount Lemmon	Mount Lemmon Survey	H	540 m	MPC · JPL
442607	2012 KZ_{8}	—	December 28, 2005	Kitt Peak	Spacewatch	H	570 m	MPC · JPL
442608	2012 KD_{9}	—	December 4, 2008	Kitt Peak	Spacewatch	H	490 m	MPC · JPL
442609	2012 KU_{42}	—	May 25, 2012	Catalina	CSS	AMO +1km	1.1 km	MPC · JPL
442610	2012 KS_{44}	—	September 5, 2007	Siding Spring	SSS	H	610 m	MPC · JPL
442611	2012 PC_{5}	—	December 9, 2006	Kitt Peak	Spacewatch	·	910 m	MPC · JPL
442612	2012 PY_{12}	—	August 10, 2012	Kitt Peak	Spacewatch	·	720 m	MPC · JPL
442613	2012 PE_{20}	—	February 12, 2008	Mount Lemmon	Mount Lemmon Survey	·	650 m	MPC · JPL
442614	2012 QZ_{12}	—	December 26, 2005	Mount Lemmon	Mount Lemmon Survey	MAS	790 m	MPC · JPL
442615	2012 QD_{35}	—	April 10, 2005	Mount Lemmon	Mount Lemmon Survey	·	610 m	MPC · JPL
442616	2012 QC_{50}	—	January 28, 2007	Kitt Peak	Spacewatch	PHO	930 m	MPC · JPL
442617	2012 RR_{20}	—	November 17, 2009	Kitt Peak	Spacewatch	·	940 m	MPC · JPL
442618	2012 RF_{21}	—	April 14, 2008	Mount Lemmon	Mount Lemmon Survey	·	640 m	MPC · JPL
442619	2012 RZ_{22}	—	December 4, 2005	Mount Lemmon	Mount Lemmon Survey	·	1.1 km	MPC · JPL
442620	2012 RD_{29}	—	March 29, 2011	Mount Lemmon	Mount Lemmon Survey	·	760 m	MPC · JPL
442621	2012 SD	—	April 9, 2008	Kitt Peak	Spacewatch	·	550 m	MPC · JPL
442622	2012 SJ_{8}	—	September 12, 2005	Kitt Peak	Spacewatch	·	620 m	MPC · JPL
442623	2012 SL_{15}	—	August 31, 2005	Kitt Peak	Spacewatch	·	620 m	MPC · JPL
442624	2012 SF_{18}	—	September 17, 2012	Kitt Peak	Spacewatch	·	600 m	MPC · JPL
442625	2012 SG_{18}	—	February 22, 2011	Kitt Peak	Spacewatch	·	630 m	MPC · JPL
442626	2012 SH_{21}	—	October 11, 1999	Socorro	LINEAR	·	640 m	MPC · JPL
442627	2012 SC_{26}	—	November 8, 2009	Mount Lemmon	Mount Lemmon Survey	·	520 m	MPC · JPL
442628	2012 SH_{50}	—	September 27, 2006	Mount Lemmon	Mount Lemmon Survey	·	1.2 km	MPC · JPL
442629	2012 SX_{57}	—	October 31, 2005	Kitt Peak	Spacewatch	·	720 m	MPC · JPL
442630	2012 SU_{64}	—	November 20, 2006	Kitt Peak	Spacewatch	·	690 m	MPC · JPL
442631	2012 TL_{8}	—	September 25, 2012	Catalina	CSS	·	1.0 km	MPC · JPL
442632	2012 TC_{18}	—	September 15, 2012	Mount Lemmon	Mount Lemmon Survey	·	790 m	MPC · JPL
442633	2012 TG_{22}	—	August 29, 2005	Kitt Peak	Spacewatch	·	650 m	MPC · JPL
442634	2012 TT_{24}	—	January 29, 1995	Kitt Peak	Spacewatch	·	1.2 km	MPC · JPL
442635	2012 TL_{28}	—	September 17, 2012	Kitt Peak	Spacewatch	·	630 m	MPC · JPL
442636	2012 TF_{45}	—	October 8, 2012	Mount Lemmon	Mount Lemmon Survey	·	880 m	MPC · JPL
442637	2012 TQ_{49}	—	March 19, 2004	Kitt Peak	Spacewatch	·	580 m	MPC · JPL
442638	2012 TY_{53}	—	July 11, 2005	Kitt Peak	Spacewatch	·	710 m	MPC · JPL
442639	2012 TB_{69}	—	May 5, 2008	Mount Lemmon	Mount Lemmon Survey	·	590 m	MPC · JPL
442640	2012 TD_{73}	—	November 21, 2009	Mount Lemmon	Mount Lemmon Survey	·	850 m	MPC · JPL
442641	2012 TS_{93}	—	March 6, 2011	Mount Lemmon	Mount Lemmon Survey	·	670 m	MPC · JPL
442642	2012 TY_{100}	—	September 4, 2008	Kitt Peak	Spacewatch	·	1.5 km	MPC · JPL
442643	2012 TH_{101}	—	November 17, 2009	Mount Lemmon	Mount Lemmon Survey	·	830 m	MPC · JPL
442644	2012 TF_{102}	—	September 1, 2005	Kitt Peak	Spacewatch	(1338) (FLO)	480 m	MPC · JPL
442645	2012 TW_{109}	—	January 10, 2007	Kitt Peak	Spacewatch	·	700 m	MPC · JPL
442646	2012 TP_{117}	—	February 17, 2007	Mount Lemmon	Mount Lemmon Survey	·	690 m	MPC · JPL
442647	2012 TP_{120}	—	October 10, 2012	Mount Lemmon	Mount Lemmon Survey	·	1.3 km	MPC · JPL
442648	2012 TM_{123}	—	May 28, 2011	Mount Lemmon	Mount Lemmon Survey	V	750 m	MPC · JPL
442649	2012 TU_{124}	—	November 10, 2009	Kitt Peak	Spacewatch	·	800 m	MPC · JPL
442650	2012 TZ_{125}	—	October 6, 2005	Mount Lemmon	Mount Lemmon Survey	·	760 m	MPC · JPL
442651	2012 TR_{132}	—	January 30, 2004	Kitt Peak	Spacewatch	·	700 m	MPC · JPL
442652	2012 TF_{136}	—	December 12, 2006	Mount Lemmon	Mount Lemmon Survey	·	680 m	MPC · JPL
442653	2012 TJ_{137}	—	January 27, 2007	Mount Lemmon	Mount Lemmon Survey	·	530 m	MPC · JPL
442654	2012 TB_{150}	—	September 16, 2012	Mount Lemmon	Mount Lemmon Survey	·	720 m	MPC · JPL
442655	2012 TY_{159}	—	September 14, 1999	Kitt Peak	Spacewatch	·	560 m	MPC · JPL
442656	2012 TK_{163}	—	March 2, 2011	Kitt Peak	Spacewatch	(2076)	730 m	MPC · JPL
442657	2012 TD_{166}	—	November 21, 2009	Mount Lemmon	Mount Lemmon Survey	·	690 m	MPC · JPL
442658	2012 TW_{179}	—	June 3, 2008	Mount Lemmon	Mount Lemmon Survey	·	830 m	MPC · JPL
442659	2012 TZ_{195}	—	September 20, 2008	Mount Lemmon	Mount Lemmon Survey	·	1.1 km	MPC · JPL
442660	2012 TK_{197}	—	September 18, 2001	Kitt Peak	Spacewatch	·	830 m	MPC · JPL
442661	2012 TF_{207}	—	November 6, 2005	Kitt Peak	Spacewatch	·	820 m	MPC · JPL
442662	2012 TW_{207}	—	October 11, 2012	Kitt Peak	Spacewatch	·	2.3 km	MPC · JPL
442663	2012 TB_{219}	—	September 30, 2005	Anderson Mesa	LONEOS	·	860 m	MPC · JPL
442664	2012 TS_{227}	—	December 24, 2006	Kitt Peak	Spacewatch	·	580 m	MPC · JPL
442665	2012 TY_{232}	—	September 24, 2005	Anderson Mesa	LONEOS	·	910 m	MPC · JPL
442666	2012 TX_{252}	—	September 21, 2012	Mount Lemmon	Mount Lemmon Survey	·	910 m	MPC · JPL
442667	2012 TF_{275}	—	December 10, 2009	Mount Lemmon	Mount Lemmon Survey	·	760 m	MPC · JPL
442668	2012 TJ_{280}	—	December 22, 2005	Catalina	CSS	·	1.0 km	MPC · JPL
442669	2012 TS_{285}	—	October 1, 2005	Mount Lemmon	Mount Lemmon Survey	·	720 m	MPC · JPL
442670	2012 TT_{291}	—	October 14, 2012	Catalina	CSS	·	960 m	MPC · JPL
442671	2012 TD_{294}	—	January 23, 2006	Mount Lemmon	Mount Lemmon Survey	·	1.0 km	MPC · JPL
442672	2012 TL_{296}	—	May 3, 2002	Kitt Peak	Spacewatch	·	1.7 km	MPC · JPL
442673	2012 TO_{301}	—	May 9, 2011	Mount Lemmon	Mount Lemmon Survey	·	700 m	MPC · JPL
442674	2012 TJ_{302}	—	October 8, 2012	Mount Lemmon	Mount Lemmon Survey	·	1.1 km	MPC · JPL
442675	2012 TT_{306}	—	December 18, 2009	Mount Lemmon	Mount Lemmon Survey	·	670 m	MPC · JPL
442676	2012 TR_{308}	—	October 23, 2005	Catalina	CSS	V	810 m	MPC · JPL
442677	2012 TM_{311}	—	August 30, 2005	Kitt Peak	Spacewatch	·	780 m	MPC · JPL
442678	2012 TN_{320}	—	October 11, 2012	Catalina	CSS	PHO	1.0 km	MPC · JPL
442679	2012 UD_{7}	—	December 15, 2009	Mount Lemmon	Mount Lemmon Survey	·	630 m	MPC · JPL
442680	2012 UZ_{13}	—	April 17, 1998	Kitt Peak	Spacewatch	·	1.4 km	MPC · JPL
442681	2012 UK_{24}	—	August 31, 2005	Kitt Peak	Spacewatch	·	530 m	MPC · JPL
442682	2012 UT_{31}	—	December 29, 2005	Mount Lemmon	Mount Lemmon Survey	V	760 m	MPC · JPL
442683	2012 UL_{38}	—	October 17, 2012	Kitt Peak	Spacewatch	·	780 m	MPC · JPL
442684	2012 US_{39}	—	October 9, 2007	Kitt Peak	Spacewatch	EOS	1.8 km	MPC · JPL
442685	2012 UU_{42}	—	September 23, 2012	Mount Lemmon	Mount Lemmon Survey	MAS	610 m	MPC · JPL
442686	2012 UT_{43}	—	November 3, 2005	Mount Lemmon	Mount Lemmon Survey	·	920 m	MPC · JPL
442687	2012 UH_{46}	—	October 30, 2005	Kitt Peak	Spacewatch	·	1.2 km	MPC · JPL
442688	2012 UF_{48}	—	September 27, 2008	Mount Lemmon	Mount Lemmon Survey	(5)	1.0 km	MPC · JPL
442689	2012 UT_{48}	—	October 11, 2005	Kitt Peak	Spacewatch	V	550 m	MPC · JPL
442690	2012 UV_{50}	—	October 1, 2005	Kitt Peak	Spacewatch	·	730 m	MPC · JPL
442691	2012 UP_{52}	—	October 15, 2012	Kitt Peak	Spacewatch	·	1.0 km	MPC · JPL
442692	2012 UC_{61}	—	April 8, 2010	WISE	WISE	·	4.3 km	MPC · JPL
442693	2012 UD_{72}	—	September 25, 2012	Mount Lemmon	Mount Lemmon Survey	(883)	670 m	MPC · JPL
442694	2012 UV_{80}	—	December 10, 2005	Kitt Peak	Spacewatch	·	870 m	MPC · JPL
442695	2012 UC_{85}	—	October 10, 1999	Socorro	LINEAR	·	600 m	MPC · JPL
442696	2012 UY_{94}	—	October 3, 2002	Socorro	LINEAR	·	670 m	MPC · JPL
442697	2012 UT_{99}	—	March 10, 2007	Kitt Peak	Spacewatch	·	690 m	MPC · JPL
442698	2012 UV_{108}	—	March 11, 2011	Mount Lemmon	Mount Lemmon Survey	·	810 m	MPC · JPL
442699	2012 UK_{110}	—	September 24, 2008	Catalina	CSS	·	1.6 km	MPC · JPL
442700	2012 UE_{112}	—	September 6, 2008	Catalina	CSS	NYS	1.1 km	MPC · JPL

== 442701–442800 ==
back to top

Designation			Discovery			Properties		Ref
Permanent	Provisional	Named after	Date	Site	Discoverer(s)	Category	Diam.	Ref
442701	2012 UH_{115}	—	August 24, 2008	Kitt Peak	Spacewatch	·	1.1 km	MPC · JPL
442702	2012 UL_{116}	—	September 25, 2012	Mount Lemmon	Mount Lemmon Survey	·	690 m	MPC · JPL
442703	2012 UO_{117}	—	September 30, 2005	Mount Lemmon	Mount Lemmon Survey	·	780 m	MPC · JPL
442704	2012 UL_{122}	—	September 4, 2008	Kitt Peak	Spacewatch	·	1.1 km	MPC · JPL
442705	2012 UD_{125}	—	November 20, 2004	Kitt Peak	Spacewatch	·	1.0 km	MPC · JPL
442706	2012 UN_{134}	—	December 29, 2005	Socorro	LINEAR	·	1.3 km	MPC · JPL
442707	2012 UD_{135}	—	September 21, 2012	Mount Lemmon	Mount Lemmon Survey	·	790 m	MPC · JPL
442708	2012 UK_{142}	—	May 20, 2005	Mount Lemmon	Mount Lemmon Survey	·	630 m	MPC · JPL
442709	2012 UH_{152}	—	June 8, 2008	Kitt Peak	Spacewatch	(2076)	700 m	MPC · JPL
442710	2012 UD_{154}	—	September 21, 2012	Kitt Peak	Spacewatch	·	1.2 km	MPC · JPL
442711	2012 UC_{159}	—	October 12, 2005	Kitt Peak	Spacewatch	·	740 m	MPC · JPL
442712	2012 UP_{159}	—	January 7, 2010	Kitt Peak	Spacewatch	·	730 m	MPC · JPL
442713	2012 UA_{162}	—	November 28, 1995	Kitt Peak	Spacewatch	·	1.5 km	MPC · JPL
442714	2012 UJ_{163}	—	October 8, 2012	Kitt Peak	Spacewatch	·	1.0 km	MPC · JPL
442715	2012 UQ_{166}	—	October 26, 2009	Mount Lemmon	Mount Lemmon Survey	·	710 m	MPC · JPL
442716	2012 VH_{11}	—	October 13, 2012	Kitt Peak	Spacewatch	·	700 m	MPC · JPL
442717	2012 VQ_{15}	—	January 26, 2003	Anderson Mesa	LONEOS	·	4.0 km	MPC · JPL
442718	2012 VJ_{17}	—	November 19, 2003	Kitt Peak	Spacewatch	·	2.6 km	MPC · JPL
442719	2012 VV_{17}	—	September 23, 2005	Kitt Peak	Spacewatch	·	660 m	MPC · JPL
442720	2012 VP_{21}	—	March 29, 2011	Mount Lemmon	Mount Lemmon Survey	·	740 m	MPC · JPL
442721 Kerouac	2012 VB_{31}	Kerouac	October 18, 2009	Mount Lemmon	Mount Lemmon Survey	·	680 m	MPC · JPL
442722	2012 VM_{31}	—	September 25, 2012	Kitt Peak	Spacewatch	·	1.4 km	MPC · JPL
442723	2012 VK_{32}	—	January 7, 2006	Mount Lemmon	Mount Lemmon Survey	NYS	1.2 km	MPC · JPL
442724	2012 VY_{33}	—	January 12, 2010	Mount Lemmon	Mount Lemmon Survey	·	720 m	MPC · JPL
442725	2012 VK_{39}	—	November 5, 2012	Kitt Peak	Spacewatch	·	1.7 km	MPC · JPL
442726	2012 VS_{49}	—	October 21, 2012	Kitt Peak	Spacewatch	·	1.3 km	MPC · JPL
442727	2012 VQ_{67}	—	October 8, 2012	Kitt Peak	Spacewatch	·	1.2 km	MPC · JPL
442728	2012 VD_{68}	—	September 18, 2012	Mount Lemmon	Mount Lemmon Survey	·	700 m	MPC · JPL
442729	2012 VE_{72}	—	September 24, 2008	Mount Lemmon	Mount Lemmon Survey	·	1.3 km	MPC · JPL
442730	2012 VW_{72}	—	October 17, 1995	Kitt Peak	Spacewatch	·	600 m	MPC · JPL
442731	2012 VU_{91}	—	October 23, 2003	Kitt Peak	Spacewatch	·	1.9 km	MPC · JPL
442732	2012 VJ_{92}	—	October 4, 2005	Catalina	CSS	(883)	870 m	MPC · JPL
442733	2012 VW_{93}	—	October 15, 2012	Kitt Peak	Spacewatch	·	1.3 km	MPC · JPL
442734	2012 VT_{95}	—	September 29, 2005	Kitt Peak	Spacewatch	·	650 m	MPC · JPL
442735	2012 VC_{99}	—	September 5, 2008	Kitt Peak	Spacewatch	V	660 m	MPC · JPL
442736	2012 VN_{99}	—	December 20, 2009	Kitt Peak	Spacewatch	·	670 m	MPC · JPL
442737	2012 VP_{99}	—	September 26, 2005	Catalina	CSS	·	870 m	MPC · JPL
442738	2012 VK_{101}	—	October 1, 1999	Kitt Peak	Spacewatch	·	580 m	MPC · JPL
442739	2012 VO_{104}	—	April 29, 2008	Kitt Peak	Spacewatch	·	600 m	MPC · JPL
442740	2012 WT_{1}	—	December 15, 2004	Kitt Peak	Spacewatch	·	1.6 km	MPC · JPL
442741	2012 WY_{1}	—	October 25, 2012	Kitt Peak	Spacewatch	(5)	1.2 km	MPC · JPL
442742	2012 WP_{3}	—	March 22, 2010	WISE	WISE	AMO +1km · slow	2.0 km	MPC · JPL
442743	2012 WF_{9}	—	December 16, 1995	Kitt Peak	Spacewatch	·	770 m	MPC · JPL
442744	2012 WW_{13}	—	July 2, 2008	Kitt Peak	Spacewatch	·	680 m	MPC · JPL
442745	2012 WG_{15}	—	January 7, 2006	Mount Lemmon	Mount Lemmon Survey	·	820 m	MPC · JPL
442746	2012 WH_{15}	—	November 19, 2012	Kitt Peak	Spacewatch	·	1.2 km	MPC · JPL
442747	2012 WO_{15}	—	October 7, 2008	Mount Lemmon	Mount Lemmon Survey	·	1.2 km	MPC · JPL
442748	2012 WJ_{19}	—	October 19, 2012	Mount Lemmon	Mount Lemmon Survey	·	1.6 km	MPC · JPL
442749	2012 WX_{20}	—	September 25, 2008	Kitt Peak	Spacewatch	·	820 m	MPC · JPL
442750	2012 WG_{24}	—	April 21, 2006	Siding Spring	SSS	EUN	1.7 km	MPC · JPL
442751	2012 WO_{24}	—	September 21, 2001	Socorro	LINEAR	NYS	940 m	MPC · JPL
442752	2012 WA_{25}	—	January 20, 2009	Catalina	CSS	·	2.8 km	MPC · JPL
442753	2012 WK_{27}	—	November 2, 2008	Mount Lemmon	Mount Lemmon Survey	EUN	1.4 km	MPC · JPL
442754	2012 WV_{27}	—	September 9, 2008	Kitt Peak	Spacewatch	·	890 m	MPC · JPL
442755	2012 WR_{29}	—	September 26, 2008	Kitt Peak	Spacewatch	·	1.3 km	MPC · JPL
442756	2012 WX_{31}	—	November 26, 2005	Mount Lemmon	Mount Lemmon Survey	·	1.1 km	MPC · JPL
442757	2012 WU_{33}	—	December 5, 2008	Kitt Peak	Spacewatch	·	1.0 km	MPC · JPL
442758	2012 XE_{14}	—	June 30, 2008	Kitt Peak	Spacewatch	V	640 m	MPC · JPL
442759	2012 XJ_{37}	—	September 15, 2007	Catalina	CSS	·	2.1 km	MPC · JPL
442760	2012 XV_{46}	—	January 22, 2006	Mount Lemmon	Mount Lemmon Survey	·	820 m	MPC · JPL
442761	2012 XR_{48}	—	September 29, 2008	Mount Lemmon	Mount Lemmon Survey	·	1.3 km	MPC · JPL
442762	2012 XJ_{51}	—	November 6, 2012	Kitt Peak	Spacewatch	PHO	1.1 km	MPC · JPL
442763	2012 XG_{53}	—	October 18, 2009	Kitt Peak	Spacewatch	L4	8.7 km	MPC · JPL
442764	2012 XL_{62}	—	September 4, 2008	Kitt Peak	Spacewatch	V	620 m	MPC · JPL
442765	2012 XH_{77}	—	July 2, 2011	Mount Lemmon	Mount Lemmon Survey	·	1.4 km	MPC · JPL
442766	2012 XE_{81}	—	December 31, 2008	Mount Lemmon	Mount Lemmon Survey	(5)	1.1 km	MPC · JPL
442767	2012 XM_{82}	—	December 25, 2005	Mount Lemmon	Mount Lemmon Survey	·	1.2 km	MPC · JPL
442768	2012 XV_{92}	—	December 30, 2005	Kitt Peak	Spacewatch	·	810 m	MPC · JPL
442769	2012 XL_{93}	—	November 13, 2012	Mount Lemmon	Mount Lemmon Survey	·	2.1 km	MPC · JPL
442770	2012 XQ_{96}	—	September 23, 2008	Mount Lemmon	Mount Lemmon Survey	V	570 m	MPC · JPL
442771	2012 XZ_{102}	—	October 16, 2012	Kitt Peak	Spacewatch	·	860 m	MPC · JPL
442772	2012 XH_{104}	—	December 6, 2012	Kitt Peak	Spacewatch	EUN	1.4 km	MPC · JPL
442773	2012 XO_{105}	—	November 4, 2007	Mount Lemmon	Mount Lemmon Survey	·	1.9 km	MPC · JPL
442774	2012 XZ_{105}	—	November 13, 2012	Mount Lemmon	Mount Lemmon Survey	·	2.5 km	MPC · JPL
442775	2012 XH_{107}	—	December 4, 2005	Kitt Peak	Spacewatch	·	860 m	MPC · JPL
442776	2012 XB_{117}	—	January 20, 2006	Catalina	CSS	·	1.3 km	MPC · JPL
442777	2012 XE_{120}	—	December 8, 2012	Kitt Peak	Spacewatch	GEF	1.0 km	MPC · JPL
442778	2012 XE_{124}	—	November 26, 2012	Mount Lemmon	Mount Lemmon Survey	·	1.3 km	MPC · JPL
442779	2012 XO_{125}	—	January 31, 2006	Kitt Peak	Spacewatch	V	650 m	MPC · JPL
442780	2012 XT_{131}	—	November 6, 2012	Kitt Peak	Spacewatch	EOS	2.2 km	MPC · JPL
442781	2012 XL_{135}	—	August 7, 1999	Kitt Peak	Spacewatch	·	1.3 km	MPC · JPL
442782	2012 XY_{135}	—	December 4, 2008	Mount Lemmon	Mount Lemmon Survey	EUN	1.0 km	MPC · JPL
442783	2012 XU_{136}	—	September 30, 2005	Catalina	CSS	·	610 m	MPC · JPL
442784	2012 XB_{140}	—	October 20, 2001	Socorro	LINEAR	·	760 m	MPC · JPL
442785	2012 XM_{144}	—	December 20, 1995	Kitt Peak	Spacewatch	(5)	1.6 km	MPC · JPL
442786	2012 XN_{144}	—	February 1, 2009	Catalina	CSS	·	1.9 km	MPC · JPL
442787	2012 XQ_{150}	—	September 12, 2001	Socorro	LINEAR	·	730 m	MPC · JPL
442788	2012 XY_{150}	—	December 8, 2012	Kitt Peak	Spacewatch	·	1.5 km	MPC · JPL
442789	2012 XW_{151}	—	November 1, 2008	Mount Lemmon	Mount Lemmon Survey	·	1.0 km	MPC · JPL
442790	2012 XA_{152}	—	December 26, 2005	Mount Lemmon	Mount Lemmon Survey	·	830 m	MPC · JPL
442791	2012 XE_{152}	—	February 3, 2009	Kitt Peak	Spacewatch	·	1.9 km	MPC · JPL
442792	2012 XS_{152}	—	October 4, 2004	Kitt Peak	Spacewatch	·	1.3 km	MPC · JPL
442793	2012 XJ_{154}	—	September 16, 2010	Mount Lemmon	Mount Lemmon Survey	·	3.5 km	MPC · JPL
442794	2012 YU_{1}	—	November 12, 2012	Mount Lemmon	Mount Lemmon Survey	·	3.5 km	MPC · JPL
442795	2013 AW_{7}	—	December 21, 2008	Mount Lemmon	Mount Lemmon Survey	·	1.1 km	MPC · JPL
442796	2013 AY_{7}	—	December 17, 2001	Kitt Peak	Spacewatch	·	830 m	MPC · JPL
442797	2013 AH_{8}	—	February 15, 1997	Kitt Peak	Spacewatch	·	2.3 km	MPC · JPL
442798	2013 AX_{8}	—	December 19, 2004	Kitt Peak	Spacewatch	·	930 m	MPC · JPL
442799	2013 AM_{14}	—	November 20, 2000	Socorro	LINEAR	·	1.5 km	MPC · JPL
442800	2013 AS_{14}	—	July 14, 2009	Kitt Peak	Spacewatch	THB	4.0 km	MPC · JPL

== 442801–442900 ==
back to top

Designation			Discovery			Properties		Ref
Permanent	Provisional	Named after	Date	Site	Discoverer(s)	Category	Diam.	Ref
442801	2013 AZ_{18}	—	February 19, 2009	Mount Lemmon	Mount Lemmon Survey	·	1.4 km	MPC · JPL
442802	2013 AN_{19}	—	December 29, 2003	Kitt Peak	Spacewatch	·	1.7 km	MPC · JPL
442803	2013 AZ_{22}	—	February 29, 2008	Kitt Peak	Spacewatch	·	2.2 km	MPC · JPL
442804	2013 AJ_{28}	—	June 8, 2005	Kitt Peak	Spacewatch	·	2.3 km	MPC · JPL
442805	2013 AL_{28}	—	November 7, 2007	Catalina	CSS	·	2.0 km	MPC · JPL
442806	2013 AO_{28}	—	September 17, 2006	Kitt Peak	Spacewatch	·	2.0 km	MPC · JPL
442807	2013 AQ_{28}	—	May 9, 2005	Kitt Peak	Spacewatch	·	1.9 km	MPC · JPL
442808	2013 AH_{33}	—	March 17, 2005	Catalina	CSS	·	1.4 km	MPC · JPL
442809	2013 AY_{38}	—	November 16, 1998	Kitt Peak	Spacewatch	·	580 m	MPC · JPL
442810	2013 AH_{41}	—	December 29, 2008	Kitt Peak	Spacewatch	MAS	770 m	MPC · JPL
442811	2013 AV_{41}	—	March 21, 2009	Mount Lemmon	Mount Lemmon Survey	·	1.3 km	MPC · JPL
442812	2013 AQ_{43}	—	December 19, 2003	Socorro	LINEAR	JUN	1.0 km	MPC · JPL
442813	2013 AM_{44}	—	December 16, 2007	Kitt Peak	Spacewatch	AGN	1.1 km	MPC · JPL
442814	2013 AD_{46}	—	August 27, 2006	Kitt Peak	Spacewatch	AGN	1.2 km	MPC · JPL
442815	2013 AK_{46}	—	December 4, 2005	Kitt Peak	Spacewatch	·	790 m	MPC · JPL
442816	2013 AJ_{52}	—	December 29, 2003	Catalina	CSS	·	2.2 km	MPC · JPL
442817	2013 AE_{55}	—	November 2, 2007	Kitt Peak	Spacewatch	·	1.7 km	MPC · JPL
442818	2013 AJ_{55}	—	December 8, 2012	Kitt Peak	Spacewatch	·	1.6 km	MPC · JPL
442819	2013 AN_{58}	—	February 4, 2009	Mount Lemmon	Mount Lemmon Survey	·	2.1 km	MPC · JPL
442820	2013 AF_{61}	—	November 15, 2012	Mount Lemmon	Mount Lemmon Survey	PHO	970 m	MPC · JPL
442821	2013 AR_{63}	—	May 28, 2010	WISE	WISE	·	3.8 km	MPC · JPL
442822	2013 AL_{64}	—	November 23, 2008	Mount Lemmon	Mount Lemmon Survey	·	1.3 km	MPC · JPL
442823	2013 AR_{68}	—	November 16, 2003	Kitt Peak	Spacewatch	·	1.6 km	MPC · JPL
442824	2013 AP_{73}	—	October 10, 2004	Kitt Peak	Spacewatch	·	1.1 km	MPC · JPL
442825	2013 AY_{75}	—	March 29, 2009	Kitt Peak	Spacewatch	AEO	1.2 km	MPC · JPL
442826	2013 AE_{78}	—	November 17, 2007	Mount Lemmon	Mount Lemmon Survey	·	1.9 km	MPC · JPL
442827	2013 AV_{78}	—	October 12, 1999	Socorro	LINEAR	·	1.3 km	MPC · JPL
442828	2013 AT_{81}	—	December 30, 2007	Kitt Peak	Spacewatch	·	1.9 km	MPC · JPL
442829	2013 AU_{81}	—	November 18, 2008	Kitt Peak	Spacewatch	MAS	740 m	MPC · JPL
442830	2013 AE_{82}	—	February 10, 2008	Mount Lemmon	Mount Lemmon Survey	·	2.4 km	MPC · JPL
442831	2013 AD_{83}	—	February 28, 2009	Mount Lemmon	Mount Lemmon Survey	·	1.6 km	MPC · JPL
442832	2013 AG_{85}	—	December 7, 2012	Mount Lemmon	Mount Lemmon Survey	·	1.3 km	MPC · JPL
442833	2013 AP_{87}	—	July 12, 2005	Mount Lemmon	Mount Lemmon Survey	·	1.9 km	MPC · JPL
442834	2013 AP_{88}	—	March 1, 2005	Catalina	CSS	·	1.1 km	MPC · JPL
442835	2013 AC_{93}	—	October 29, 2008	Mount Lemmon	Mount Lemmon Survey	·	1.7 km	MPC · JPL
442836	2013 AE_{94}	—	September 9, 2008	Mount Lemmon	Mount Lemmon Survey	MAS	800 m	MPC · JPL
442837	2013 AZ_{96}	—	December 27, 2005	Kitt Peak	Spacewatch	·	700 m	MPC · JPL
442838	2013 AN_{97}	—	November 19, 2007	Mount Lemmon	Mount Lemmon Survey	·	2.3 km	MPC · JPL
442839	2013 AB_{100}	—	October 6, 2000	Anderson Mesa	LONEOS	MAS	830 m	MPC · JPL
442840	2013 AZ_{100}	—	December 12, 2012	Kitt Peak	Spacewatch	THB	2.9 km	MPC · JPL
442841	2013 AK_{103}	—	January 5, 2013	Kitt Peak	Spacewatch	·	3.1 km	MPC · JPL
442842	2013 AR_{108}	—	February 9, 2008	Mount Lemmon	Mount Lemmon Survey	·	2.3 km	MPC · JPL
442843	2013 AF_{113}	—	June 14, 2005	Mount Lemmon	Mount Lemmon Survey	·	2.4 km	MPC · JPL
442844	2013 AP_{116}	—	January 21, 2006	Kitt Peak	Spacewatch	·	1.1 km	MPC · JPL
442845	2013 AH_{117}	—	February 2, 2008	Kitt Peak	Spacewatch	·	2.7 km	MPC · JPL
442846	2013 AR_{118}	—	October 9, 2007	Mount Lemmon	Mount Lemmon Survey	·	1.6 km	MPC · JPL
442847	2013 AR_{119}	—	February 25, 2006	Kitt Peak	Spacewatch	·	1.5 km	MPC · JPL
442848	2013 AY_{120}	—	August 23, 2004	Kitt Peak	Spacewatch	·	1.2 km	MPC · JPL
442849	2013 AA_{122}	—	November 8, 2007	Kitt Peak	Spacewatch	·	2.1 km	MPC · JPL
442850	2013 AN_{122}	—	September 16, 2001	Socorro	LINEAR	DOR	3.5 km	MPC · JPL
442851	2013 AX_{123}	—	December 30, 2008	Mount Lemmon	Mount Lemmon Survey	·	950 m	MPC · JPL
442852	2013 AC_{125}	—	March 2, 2009	Kitt Peak	Spacewatch	·	1.5 km	MPC · JPL
442853	2013 AE_{126}	—	January 20, 2009	Catalina	CSS	·	1.5 km	MPC · JPL
442854	2013 AR_{126}	—	September 19, 2011	Mount Lemmon	Mount Lemmon Survey	·	1.7 km	MPC · JPL
442855	2013 AH_{130}	—	November 7, 2007	Kitt Peak	Spacewatch	·	1.7 km	MPC · JPL
442856	2013 AY_{131}	—	December 21, 2003	Kitt Peak	Spacewatch	·	1.6 km	MPC · JPL
442857	2013 AF_{135}	—	January 18, 2009	Mount Lemmon	Mount Lemmon Survey	·	1.3 km	MPC · JPL
442858	2013 AQ_{136}	—	December 22, 2008	Kitt Peak	Spacewatch	·	870 m	MPC · JPL
442859	2013 AZ_{137}	—	March 22, 2009	Mount Lemmon	Mount Lemmon Survey	·	1.5 km	MPC · JPL
442860	2013 AB_{150}	—	February 20, 2009	Kitt Peak	Spacewatch	·	2.7 km	MPC · JPL
442861	2013 AH_{161}	—	October 10, 2007	Kitt Peak	Spacewatch	·	1.4 km	MPC · JPL
442862	2013 AN_{162}	—	April 15, 2010	WISE	WISE	·	2.0 km	MPC · JPL
442863	2013 AX_{165}	—	June 10, 2010	Kitt Peak	Spacewatch	·	1.6 km	MPC · JPL
442864	2013 AO_{166}	—	April 27, 2009	Kitt Peak	Spacewatch	·	1.8 km	MPC · JPL
442865	2013 AP_{171}	—	May 1, 2010	WISE	WISE	·	2.7 km	MPC · JPL
442866	2013 AR_{173}	—	April 7, 2003	Kitt Peak	Spacewatch	·	2.3 km	MPC · JPL
442867	2013 AT_{174}	—	March 4, 2005	Mount Lemmon	Mount Lemmon Survey	·	1.6 km	MPC · JPL
442868	2013 AY_{178}	—	June 14, 2007	Kitt Peak	Spacewatch	·	1.3 km	MPC · JPL
442869	2013 BH_{9}	—	September 13, 2007	Mount Lemmon	Mount Lemmon Survey	·	1.3 km	MPC · JPL
442870	2013 BL_{9}	—	September 10, 2010	Mount Lemmon	Mount Lemmon Survey	TIR	2.9 km	MPC · JPL
442871	2013 BY_{13}	—	January 17, 2013	Kitt Peak	Spacewatch	EOS	1.6 km	MPC · JPL
442872	2013 BB_{15}	—	January 16, 2004	Kitt Peak	Spacewatch	·	1.3 km	MPC · JPL
442873	2013 BE_{15}	—	February 3, 2000	Kitt Peak	Spacewatch	·	1.7 km	MPC · JPL
442874	2013 BJ_{15}	—	October 20, 2011	Mount Lemmon	Mount Lemmon Survey	·	1.4 km	MPC · JPL
442875	2013 BA_{24}	—	November 22, 2006	Mount Lemmon	Mount Lemmon Survey	EOS	1.9 km	MPC · JPL
442876	2013 BE_{24}	—	January 5, 2013	Mount Lemmon	Mount Lemmon Survey	·	1.7 km	MPC · JPL
442877	2013 BX_{25}	—	December 8, 2012	Mount Lemmon	Mount Lemmon Survey	·	2.3 km	MPC · JPL
442878	2013 BG_{29}	—	January 16, 2013	Catalina	CSS	·	1.3 km	MPC · JPL
442879	2013 BN_{33}	—	February 4, 2009	Mount Lemmon	Mount Lemmon Survey	(5)	1.4 km	MPC · JPL
442880	2013 BS_{35}	—	January 5, 2013	Mount Lemmon	Mount Lemmon Survey	·	1.2 km	MPC · JPL
442881	2013 BX_{37}	—	October 10, 2004	Kitt Peak	Spacewatch	MAS	660 m	MPC · JPL
442882	2013 BU_{38}	—	February 10, 2008	Mount Lemmon	Mount Lemmon Survey	·	3.0 km	MPC · JPL
442883	2013 BY_{38}	—	January 17, 2009	Kitt Peak	Spacewatch	MAR	900 m	MPC · JPL
442884	2013 BB_{39}	—	January 19, 2008	Mount Lemmon	Mount Lemmon Survey	INA	3.1 km	MPC · JPL
442885	2013 BU_{43}	—	September 26, 2006	Kitt Peak	Spacewatch	KOR	1.0 km	MPC · JPL
442886	2013 BK_{47}	—	September 23, 2011	Kitt Peak	Spacewatch	·	1.9 km	MPC · JPL
442887	2013 BS_{47}	—	November 13, 2007	Kitt Peak	Spacewatch	WIT	850 m	MPC · JPL
442888	2013 BU_{47}	—	February 12, 2008	Kitt Peak	Spacewatch	·	2.0 km	MPC · JPL
442889	2013 BE_{56}	—	January 19, 2009	Mount Lemmon	Mount Lemmon Survey	EUN	1.1 km	MPC · JPL
442890	2013 BN_{59}	—	August 28, 2006	Kitt Peak	Spacewatch	HOF	2.3 km	MPC · JPL
442891	2013 BN_{60}	—	September 29, 2011	Mount Lemmon	Mount Lemmon Survey	·	1.5 km	MPC · JPL
442892	2013 BX_{63}	—	June 7, 2010	WISE	WISE	·	2.3 km	MPC · JPL
442893	2013 BJ_{69}	—	October 8, 2007	Catalina	CSS	·	1.5 km	MPC · JPL
442894	2013 BL_{72}	—	February 22, 2009	Kitt Peak	Spacewatch	·	1.8 km	MPC · JPL
442895	2013 BR_{73}	—	December 15, 2007	Catalina	CSS	BRA	1.5 km	MPC · JPL
442896	2013 BQ_{75}	—	January 2, 2009	Mount Lemmon	Mount Lemmon Survey	NYS	1.2 km	MPC · JPL
442897	2013 BE_{76}	—	February 19, 2009	Kitt Peak	Spacewatch	·	910 m	MPC · JPL
442898	2013 CF	—	January 16, 2013	Catalina	CSS	·	1.3 km	MPC · JPL
442899	2013 CE_{3}	—	July 30, 2009	Kitt Peak	Spacewatch	·	4.7 km	MPC · JPL
442900	2013 CH_{9}	—	April 2, 2000	Kitt Peak	Spacewatch	·	1.6 km	MPC · JPL

== 442901–443000 ==
back to top

Designation			Discovery			Properties		Ref
Permanent	Provisional	Named after	Date	Site	Discoverer(s)	Category	Diam.	Ref
442901	2013 CJ_{9}	—	February 5, 2009	Mount Lemmon	Mount Lemmon Survey	·	2.4 km	MPC · JPL
442902	2013 CZ_{9}	—	January 5, 2013	Kitt Peak	Spacewatch	·	3.6 km	MPC · JPL
442903	2013 CT_{10}	—	November 26, 2003	Kitt Peak	Spacewatch	·	1.5 km	MPC · JPL
442904	2013 CB_{11}	—	October 23, 2011	Mount Lemmon	Mount Lemmon Survey	·	1.7 km	MPC · JPL
442905	2013 CQ_{12}	—	February 3, 2009	Kitt Peak	Spacewatch	·	1.4 km	MPC · JPL
442906	2013 CV_{12}	—	February 1, 2013	Kitt Peak	Spacewatch	·	2.2 km	MPC · JPL
442907	2013 CK_{15}	—	February 27, 2009	Catalina	CSS	·	1.2 km	MPC · JPL
442908	2013 CC_{16}	—	September 29, 1997	Kitt Peak	Spacewatch	·	1.9 km	MPC · JPL
442909	2013 CS_{19}	—	September 18, 2007	Siding Spring	SSS	·	2.4 km	MPC · JPL
442910	2013 CR_{20}	—	January 19, 2013	Mount Lemmon	Mount Lemmon Survey	·	1.7 km	MPC · JPL
442911	2013 CH_{25}	—	September 28, 2003	Anderson Mesa	LONEOS	MAR	970 m	MPC · JPL
442912	2013 CR_{26}	—	January 22, 2002	Kitt Peak	Spacewatch	·	2.2 km	MPC · JPL
442913	2013 CA_{31}	—	March 2, 2008	Kitt Peak	Spacewatch	VER	2.7 km	MPC · JPL
442914	2013 CA_{33}	—	January 10, 2007	Kitt Peak	Spacewatch	·	4.7 km	MPC · JPL
442915	2013 CU_{36}	—	January 7, 2013	Kitt Peak	Spacewatch	·	2.9 km	MPC · JPL
442916	2013 CL_{39}	—	January 31, 2009	Mount Lemmon	Mount Lemmon Survey	·	1.7 km	MPC · JPL
442917	2013 CU_{39}	—	October 30, 2007	Mount Lemmon	Mount Lemmon Survey	·	1.2 km	MPC · JPL
442918	2013 CZ_{39}	—	January 25, 2009	Kitt Peak	Spacewatch	·	1.8 km	MPC · JPL
442919	2013 CH_{42}	—	August 23, 2004	Kitt Peak	Spacewatch	·	3.0 km	MPC · JPL
442920	2013 CG_{43}	—	March 29, 2009	Mount Lemmon	Mount Lemmon Survey	·	1.5 km	MPC · JPL
442921	2013 CY_{44}	—	October 15, 2007	Mount Lemmon	Mount Lemmon Survey	·	1.1 km	MPC · JPL
442922	2013 CM_{45}	—	February 2, 2008	Kitt Peak	Spacewatch	EOS	1.8 km	MPC · JPL
442923	2013 CA_{48}	—	September 16, 2010	Kitt Peak	Spacewatch	·	3.6 km	MPC · JPL
442924	2013 CW_{48}	—	November 18, 1998	Kitt Peak	Spacewatch	·	680 m	MPC · JPL
442925	2013 CF_{49}	—	September 26, 2000	Socorro	LINEAR	MAS	1.0 km	MPC · JPL
442926	2013 CS_{49}	—	January 7, 2013	Kitt Peak	Spacewatch	·	3.1 km	MPC · JPL
442927	2013 CQ_{51}	—	March 17, 2009	Kitt Peak	Spacewatch	·	1.6 km	MPC · JPL
442928	2013 CL_{52}	—	September 29, 2003	Kitt Peak	Spacewatch	(5)	1.3 km	MPC · JPL
442929	2013 CH_{64}	—	January 20, 2013	Kitt Peak	Spacewatch	·	3.2 km	MPC · JPL
442930	2013 CQ_{64}	—	October 18, 2011	Kitt Peak	Spacewatch	·	1.9 km	MPC · JPL
442931	2013 CW_{64}	—	December 14, 2006	Kitt Peak	Spacewatch	EOS	2.2 km	MPC · JPL
442932	2013 CY_{64}	—	July 13, 2010	WISE	WISE	·	3.4 km	MPC · JPL
442933	2013 CA_{66}	—	December 13, 2007	Socorro	LINEAR	·	2.0 km	MPC · JPL
442934	2013 CE_{66}	—	October 8, 2007	Catalina	CSS	JUN	1.0 km	MPC · JPL
442935	2013 CR_{70}	—	February 26, 2009	Kitt Peak	Spacewatch	·	1.4 km	MPC · JPL
442936	2013 CL_{71}	—	May 25, 2010	WISE	WISE	·	2.6 km	MPC · JPL
442937	2013 CN_{72}	—	April 9, 2010	Mount Lemmon	Mount Lemmon Survey	·	1.4 km	MPC · JPL
442938	2013 CG_{74}	—	September 4, 2010	Mount Lemmon	Mount Lemmon Survey	·	3.1 km	MPC · JPL
442939	2013 CO_{74}	—	January 4, 2006	Catalina	CSS	·	870 m	MPC · JPL
442940	2013 CZ_{74}	—	February 5, 2013	Mount Lemmon	Mount Lemmon Survey	EOS	1.6 km	MPC · JPL
442941	2013 CH_{75}	—	February 5, 2013	Catalina	CSS	·	2.8 km	MPC · JPL
442942	2013 CP_{76}	—	January 20, 2013	Kitt Peak	Spacewatch	·	2.9 km	MPC · JPL
442943	2013 CZ_{86}	—	January 14, 1996	Kitt Peak	Spacewatch	·	4.1 km	MPC · JPL
442944	2013 CQ_{87}	—	August 15, 2009	Kitt Peak	Spacewatch	·	2.5 km	MPC · JPL
442945	2013 CL_{90}	—	December 29, 2003	Catalina	CSS	EUN	1.3 km	MPC · JPL
442946	2013 CM_{90}	—	May 1, 2008	Kitt Peak	Spacewatch	·	3.4 km	MPC · JPL
442947	2013 CM_{95}	—	February 2, 2008	Kitt Peak	Spacewatch	EOS	1.6 km	MPC · JPL
442948	2013 CH_{99}	—	February 13, 2008	Kitt Peak	Spacewatch	·	1.8 km	MPC · JPL
442949	2013 CJ_{100}	—	November 1, 2007	Kitt Peak	Spacewatch	·	1.2 km	MPC · JPL
442950	2013 CM_{103}	—	February 2, 2013	Kitt Peak	Spacewatch	·	1.8 km	MPC · JPL
442951	2013 CU_{104}	—	October 5, 1999	Kitt Peak	Spacewatch	·	3.2 km	MPC · JPL
442952	2013 CZ_{104}	—	August 19, 2006	Kitt Peak	Spacewatch	·	1.7 km	MPC · JPL
442953	2013 CA_{114}	—	January 28, 2004	Kitt Peak	Spacewatch	·	1.7 km	MPC · JPL
442954	2013 CL_{115}	—	July 27, 2010	WISE	WISE	·	4.1 km	MPC · JPL
442955	2013 CF_{116}	—	February 11, 2008	Kitt Peak	Spacewatch	·	2.6 km	MPC · JPL
442956	2013 CW_{116}	—	September 11, 2004	Kitt Peak	Spacewatch	·	3.6 km	MPC · JPL
442957	2013 CK_{119}	—	May 10, 2005	Kitt Peak	Spacewatch	·	1.5 km	MPC · JPL
442958	2013 CG_{121}	—	November 2, 2007	Kitt Peak	Spacewatch	·	1.7 km	MPC · JPL
442959	2013 CA_{123}	—	January 4, 2013	Kitt Peak	Spacewatch	·	2.8 km	MPC · JPL
442960	2013 CQ_{123}	—	September 24, 2005	Kitt Peak	Spacewatch	LIX	3.2 km	MPC · JPL
442961	2013 CS_{124}	—	January 21, 2013	Mount Lemmon	Mount Lemmon Survey	·	3.2 km	MPC · JPL
442962	2013 CG_{125}	—	March 1, 2009	Kitt Peak	Spacewatch	(5)	1.4 km	MPC · JPL
442963	2013 CN_{125}	—	February 16, 2007	Catalina	CSS	·	3.4 km	MPC · JPL
442964	2013 CB_{126}	—	October 29, 1999	Kitt Peak	Spacewatch	·	3.1 km	MPC · JPL
442965	2013 CP_{130}	—	February 10, 2002	Kitt Peak	Spacewatch	EOS	1.8 km	MPC · JPL
442966	2013 CC_{131}	—	January 17, 2013	Mount Lemmon	Mount Lemmon Survey	·	2.6 km	MPC · JPL
442967	2013 CF_{131}	—	October 21, 2006	Mount Lemmon	Mount Lemmon Survey	·	2.1 km	MPC · JPL
442968	2013 CG_{134}	—	October 22, 2012	Kitt Peak	Spacewatch	CYB	7.5 km	MPC · JPL
442969	2013 CV_{135}	—	November 14, 1995	Kitt Peak	Spacewatch	·	1.6 km	MPC · JPL
442970	2013 CH_{136}	—	December 18, 2003	Socorro	LINEAR	·	2.3 km	MPC · JPL
442971	2013 CK_{136}	—	October 18, 2007	Kitt Peak	Spacewatch	·	1.4 km	MPC · JPL
442972	2013 CB_{137}	—	December 4, 2007	Mount Lemmon	Mount Lemmon Survey	WIT	1.2 km	MPC · JPL
442973	2013 CZ_{137}	—	October 3, 2011	XuYi	PMO NEO Survey Program	·	2.1 km	MPC · JPL
442974	2013 CJ_{141}	—	March 7, 2008	Mount Lemmon	Mount Lemmon Survey	·	1.7 km	MPC · JPL
442975	2013 CV_{141}	—	December 4, 2007	Kitt Peak	Spacewatch	·	1.4 km	MPC · JPL
442976	2013 CB_{147}	—	October 22, 2006	Catalina	CSS	AGN	1.4 km	MPC · JPL
442977	2013 CO_{149}	—	March 3, 2005	Kitt Peak	Spacewatch	·	1.1 km	MPC · JPL
442978	2013 CL_{150}	—	February 14, 2013	Kitt Peak	Spacewatch	·	2.9 km	MPC · JPL
442979	2013 CH_{151}	—	February 6, 2007	Kitt Peak	Spacewatch	·	2.6 km	MPC · JPL
442980	2013 CX_{154}	—	January 9, 2013	Mount Lemmon	Mount Lemmon Survey	·	3.5 km	MPC · JPL
442981	2013 CB_{155}	—	March 13, 2008	Mount Lemmon	Mount Lemmon Survey	·	2.0 km	MPC · JPL
442982	2013 CP_{155}	—	January 30, 2008	Mount Lemmon	Mount Lemmon Survey	·	1.8 km	MPC · JPL
442983	2013 CQ_{158}	—	February 14, 2013	Kitt Peak	Spacewatch	·	2.1 km	MPC · JPL
442984	2013 CP_{159}	—	February 8, 2008	Mount Lemmon	Mount Lemmon Survey	·	2.3 km	MPC · JPL
442985	2013 CK_{161}	—	February 2, 2008	Mount Lemmon	Mount Lemmon Survey	·	1.7 km	MPC · JPL
442986	2013 CK_{165}	—	October 21, 2006	Mount Lemmon	Mount Lemmon Survey	·	2.1 km	MPC · JPL
442987	2013 CN_{165}	—	November 17, 2011	Mount Lemmon	Mount Lemmon Survey	·	2.0 km	MPC · JPL
442988	2013 CK_{166}	—	March 24, 2003	Kitt Peak	Spacewatch	EOS	2.3 km	MPC · JPL
442989	2013 CB_{170}	—	November 2, 2011	Mount Lemmon	Mount Lemmon Survey	·	2.2 km	MPC · JPL
442990	2013 CV_{173}	—	January 3, 2009	Mount Lemmon	Mount Lemmon Survey	NYS	1.3 km	MPC · JPL
442991	2013 CO_{174}	—	September 18, 2010	Mount Lemmon	Mount Lemmon Survey	·	3.2 km	MPC · JPL
442992	2013 CT_{176}	—	October 22, 2008	Kitt Peak	Spacewatch	·	1.1 km	MPC · JPL
442993	2013 CQ_{177}	—	September 22, 2011	Catalina	CSS	MAR	1.1 km	MPC · JPL
442994	2013 CM_{179}	—	December 5, 2007	Kitt Peak	Spacewatch	AEO	1.2 km	MPC · JPL
442995	2013 CM_{180}	—	November 3, 2011	Mount Lemmon	Mount Lemmon Survey	·	2.6 km	MPC · JPL
442996	2013 CV_{180}	—	December 15, 2006	Kitt Peak	Spacewatch	·	3.8 km	MPC · JPL
442997	2013 CE_{181}	—	March 10, 2000	Kitt Peak	Spacewatch	·	1.9 km	MPC · JPL
442998	2013 CR_{181}	—	February 7, 1997	Kitt Peak	Spacewatch	·	1.1 km	MPC · JPL
442999	2013 CO_{183}	—	October 21, 1995	Kitt Peak	Spacewatch	RAF	980 m	MPC · JPL
443000	2013 CA_{187}	—	January 10, 2007	Mount Lemmon	Mount Lemmon Survey	·	3.1 km	MPC · JPL

back to top

== Meaning of names ==
As minor planet discoveries are confirmed, they are given a permanent number by the IAU's Minor Planet Center (MPC), and the discoverers can then submit names for them, following the IAU's naming conventions. The list below concerns those minor planets in the specified number-range that have received names, and explains the meanings of those names.

Official naming citations of newly named small Solar System bodies are approved and published in a bulletin by IAU's Working Group for Small Bodies Nomenclature (WGSBN). Before May 2021, citations were published in MPC's Minor Planet Circulars for many decades. Recent citations can also be found on the JPL Small-Body Database (SBDB). Until his death in 2016, German astronomer Lutz D. Schmadel compiled these citations into the Dictionary of Minor Planet Names (DMP) and regularly updated the collection.

Based on Paul Herget's The Names of the Minor Planets, Schmadel also researched the unclear origin of numerous asteroids, most of which had been named prior to World War II. This article incorporates text from this source, which is in the public domain: SBDB New namings may only be added to this list below after official publication as the preannouncement of names is condemned. The WGSBN publishes a comprehensive guideline for the naming rules of non-cometary small Solar System bodies.

Named minor planet	Provisional	This minor planet was named for...	Ref · Catalog
442721 Kerouac	2012 VB_{31}	Jean-Louis Lebris de Kérouac (1922–1969), known as Jack Kerouac, was an American writer and poet. His novels, including On the Road and The Subterraneans, established a new writing style of spontaneous prose. Kerouac is considered a pioneer of the 1950s and 1960s Beat Generation.	IAU · 442721
