= Alene Lee =

American writer (1931–1991)

Alene Lee (1931–1991) was an African-American member of the Beat Generation in New York City whose romantic relationship with Jack Kerouac was the central theme in his novel The Subterraneans. Kerouac used the pseudonym Mardou Fox for Lee. Lee was also the model for the character of Irene May in Book of Dreams and Big Sur. Lee shunned publicity, but her daughter has written about her life.

Born Arlene Garris, in Washington D.C., she grew up in Staten Island, New York and met Jack Kerouac in 1953, when she was typing manuscripts for Burroughs and Allen Ginsberg.
