= The Subterraneans =

1958 novel by Jack Kerouac

- First edition
- Author: Jack Kerouac
- Cover artist: Roy Kuhlman
- Language: English
- Publisher: Grove Press
- Publication date: 1958
- Publication place: United States
- Media type: Print (hardback and paperback)
- Pages: Approx. 111 pp
- ISBN: 0-8021-3186-7
- OCLC: 285385
- Preceded by: On the Road (1957)
- Followed by: The Dharma Bums (1958)

The Subterraneans is a 1958 novella by the Beat Generation author Jack Kerouac. It is a semi-fictional account of his short romance with Alene Lee (1931–1991), an African-American woman, in Greenwich Village, New York. It was the first work of Kerouac’s to be released following the success of On the Road. The Subterraneans and its following novel, The Dharma Bums, both proved to be popular when released in 1958, and are now seen as important works of the Beat Literature. A Hollywood film adaptation would be released in 1960.

== Background ==
Kerouac met Alene in the late summer of 1953 when she was typing up the manuscripts of William Burroughs and Allen Ginsberg, in Ginsberg's Lower East Side apartment. In the novella, Kerouac moved the story from New York City to San Francisco and renamed Alene Lee "Mardou Fox". She is described as a carefree spirit who frequents the jazz clubs and bars of the budding Beat scene of San Francisco. Other well-known personalities and friends from the author's life also appear thinly disguised in the novel. The character Frank Carmody is based on William S. Burroughs, and Adam Moorad on Allen Ginsberg. Even Gore Vidal appears as successful novelist Arial Lavalina. Kerouac's alter ego is named Leo Percepied, and his long-time friend Neal Cassady is mentioned in passing as Leroy.

== Character key ==
Kerouac often based his fictional characters on friends and family.

Because of the objections of my early publishers I was not allowed to use the same personae names in each work.

— Jack Kerouac, Visions of Cody

Real-life person	Character name
Jack Kerouac	Leo Percepied
Anton Rosenberg	Julien Alexander
Iris Brodie	Roxanne
William S. Burroughs	Frank Carmody
Joan Vollmer	Jane
Lucien Carr	Sam Vedder
Neal Cassady	Leroy
Gregory Corso	Yuri Gligoric
Allen Eager	Roger Beloit
William Gaddis	Harold Sand
Allen Ginsberg	Adam Moorad
Luanne Henderson	Annie
John Clellon Holmes	Balliol MacJones
Bill Keck	Fritz Nicholas
Alene Lee	Mardou Fox
Jerry Newman	Larry O'Hara
Gore Vidal	Arial Lavalina
David Diamond	Sylvester Strauss

== Criticism and literary significance ==
The position of jazz and jazz culture is central to the novel, tying together the themes of Kerouac's writing here as elsewhere, and expressed in the "spontaneous prose" style in which he composed most of his works. The following quotation from Chapter 1 illustrates the spontaneous prose style of The Subterraneans:

Making a new start, starting from fresh in the rain, 'Why should anyone want to hurt my little heart, my feet, my little hands, my skin that I'm wrapt in because God wants me warm and Inside, my toes—why did God make all this so decayable and dieable and harmable and wants to make me realize and scream—why the wild ground and bodies bare and breaks—I quaked when the giver creamed, when my father screamed, my mother dreamed—I started small and ballooned up and now I'm big and a naked child again and only to cry and fear.—Ah—Protect yourself, angel of no harm, you who've never and could never harm and crack another innocent in its shell and thin veiled pain—wrap a robe around you, honeylamb—protect yourself from harm and wait, till Daddy comes again, and Mama throws you warm inside her valley of the moon, loom at the loom of patient time, be happy in the mornings.

— Mardou Fox, in The Subterraneans

== Film version ==
A 1960 film adaptation was released by Metro-Goldwyn-Mayer to capitalize on the book’s success. The producers changed the African-American character of Mardou Fox, Kerouac's love interest, to a young French girl (played by Leslie Caron) to better fit both contemporary social and Hollywood palates.
