= Bruce McDaniel =

American musician and record producer

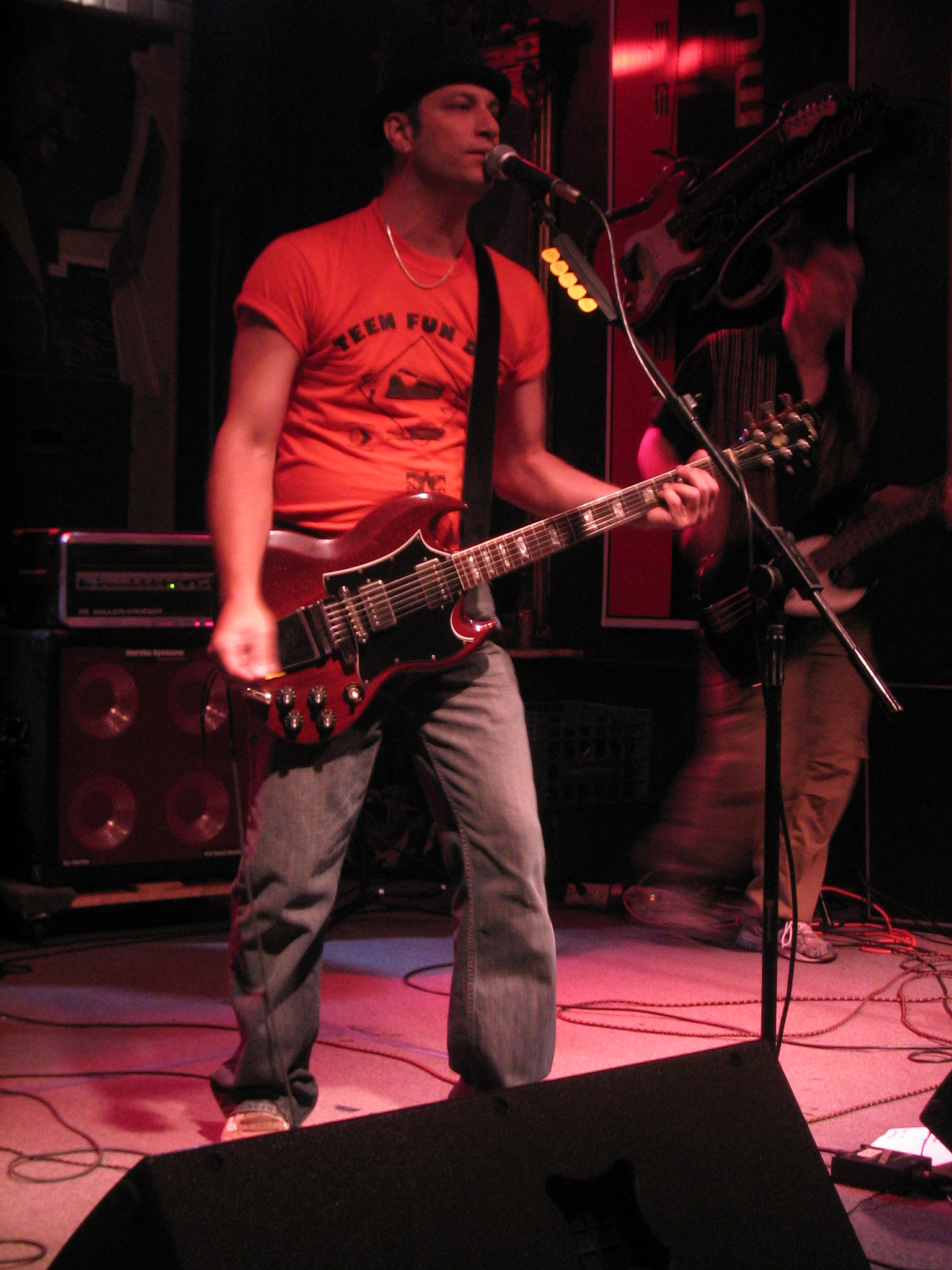
McDaniel at Theodore's, Springfield, MA, August 2004

Bruce McDaniel (born September 23, 1962) is an American musician and record producer currently living in New Orleans.

== Biography ==
McDaniel was born in Boston, Massachusetts, of Mexican and Scottish/American parents on September 23, 1962, and grew up in New York. He was raised by musical parents who met while attending the Juilliard School of Music. He had an early start in NYC's underground punk rock scene as lead guitarist for the Sic F*cks with Tish Bellomo and Snooky Bellomo, a band who, despite the inability to have their name said on the radio, parlayed their comedy-punk spectacle to a feature in Playboy Magazine and movie appearances, including 1982's Alone in the Dark.

After the dissolution of the late '70s punk scene, McDaniel laid low for much of the 1980s, recording jingles and demos. A group of these demos, recorded under the name Life of Riley (featuring Peter Engisch and Perry Gartner) were picked up by Grammy-award nominated producer Paul Wickliffe, who produced an album's worth of material for the group, only to have the arrangement (and the group) dissolve under contract disputes. Several of these tracks can be heard on the McDaniel/Gartner collection Ongepotchket.

Through the 1990s, he served as guitarist and bassist for R&B singer Vaneese Thomas, daughter of Rufus Thomas, known for her 1987 top 20 hits "Let's Talk It Over" and "(I Wanna Get) Close To You". McDaniel was ultimately elevated to the role of musical director of her touring band, a job which he still holds.

The 1990s also saw the formation of McDaniel's band Nine Men's Morris and their first release Monster in My Stomach on Segue Records. McDaniel provided the songs, guitars and lead vocals, and was joined by Gartner on drums and bassist Donald Kyle. The follow-up album, It's a Wonderful Life, was released in 2004 to excellent reviews, with the title cut being featured on MTV's show Made.

In 2000, McDaniel extended his musical horizons by composing a ballet, Alice in Wonderland, set on the East Coast Youth Ballet. The ballet was performed in 2001 and 2002 at the Rich Forum and Palace Theater in Stamford, Connecticut, to sold-out houses and rave reviews.

McDaniel has also performed/recorded with Gil Parris, Valerie Capers, Carla Thomas, Paul Shaffer, Randy Brecker, Johnny Thunders, Lydia Lunch, James Chance, Richard Lloyd, Shawn Pelton, Sid McGinnis, Kirk Whalum, Jill Sobule, Nick Moroch, Paul Adamy, Shelton Becton, Chieli Minucci, Philippe Saisse, Eileen Ivers, Tommy Mandel, Napoleon Murphy Brock, Mike Keneally, Ray White, Wycliffe Gordon, David Spinozza, Bernie Williams, Lloyd Price, Average White Band, Todd Rundgren and the Ed Palermo Big Band, among others.

As of December 2006, he is the lead vocalist and guitar player for Nine Men's Morris, and can be seen performing the music of Frank Zappa with the Ed Palermo Big Band.

In 2008 he composed the score for the film School Play, which won the Best Documentary Film award at the Big Apple Film Festival in New York.

In late 2008, he produced the album Eddy Loves Frank for the Ed Palermo Big Band, which was released early in 2009. Eddy Loves Frank spent 10 weeks in the CMJ Jazz charts top 20, peaking at number 5.

In 2010 and 2011, McDaniel provided the music for Climate Week NYC.

As of 2009, the reformed Sic F*cks have been performing sporadically in and around New York City with McDaniel on guitar. In November 2011, they performed in Hamilton, Ontario with guests J. P. Patterson of The Dictators, Albert Bouchard of Blue Öyster Cult and Gord Lewis from Teenage Head. Other guest appearances with the band have included Dennis Dunaway of Alice Cooper and Jeff Magnum of The Dead Boys.

As of 2011, McDaniel is performing with a reformed lineup of the Tuff Darts, filling the guitar role of the late Jeff Salen.

In 2014, he produced the album Oh No, Not Jazz! for the Ed Palermo Big Band, which received a 4-star review from Down Beat Magazine, as well as being the #10 album of the year in their annual readers poll. In 2015, he produced the album One Child Left Behind for the Ed Palermo Big Band, featuring Napoleon Murphy Brock and Frank Zappa's sister Candy Zappa. In 2016, he produced the albums The Great Un-American Songbook, Volumes 1 & 2 for the Ed Palermo Big Band, featuring Napoleon Murphy Brock, which also received a 4-star review from Down Beat Magazine. Volume 3 will be released in 2020. In 2017, he produced the album The Adventures of Zodd Zundgren for the Ed Palermo Big Band, featuring Napoleon Murphy Brock, an album of jazz big band arrangements of Todd Rundgren and Frank Zappa (including McDaniel's arrangement of Zappa's "Big Swifty" and others). Rundgren himself performed with the band at the album release show.

McDaniel was a member of Kasim Sulton's Utopia for their spring 2020 tour, joined by Andy Ascolese on drums and Gil Assayas on keyboards. This tour followed McDaniel's first appearance as a member of Todd Rundgren's band, alongside longtime members Sulton, Greg Hawkes, and Prairie Prince. In spring 2021, McDaniel will be joined by Sulton, Prince, Assayas, Eliot Lewis, Michele Gray Rundgren, Bobby Strickland, Steven Stanley, Mia Jones, and Grace Yoo for Rundgren's Clearly Human virtual tour, performing Rundgren's album Nearly Human in its entirety, along with numerous songs from Rundgren's vast body of work.

== Discography ==
=== Nine Men's Morris ===
- Monster in My Stomach – 1999
- It's a Wonderful Life – 2004

=== Others ===
- Ongepotchket – 1997
- Mile 23 (Dana Edelman) – 2005
- Strength (Gil Parris) – 2006
- Better Late Than Never (Danny Brill) – 2008
- Eddy Loves Frank (Ed Palermo Big Band) – 2009
- Soul Sister Vol. 1 (Vaneese Thomas) – 2009
- Oh No, Not Jazz (Ed Palermo Big Band) – 2014
- Blues for My Father (Vaneese Thomas) – 2014
- One Child Left Behind (Ed Palermo Big Band) – 2016
- The Great Un-American Songbook, Volumes 1 & 2 (Ed Palermo Big Band) – 2017
- The Adventures of Zodd Zundgren (Ed Palermo Big Band) – 2017
- Inside Out (Average White Band) – 2017
- Run for Your Life: The Great Un-American Songbook, Volume 3 (Ed Palermo Big Band) – 2020
