= Bellomo =

Bellomo may refer to:

== People ==
- Brendan Bellomo, American film director and producer
- Eileen Bellomo and Tish Bellomo, members of the rock group The Stilettos
- Liborio Bellomo, American mobster
- Nicola Bellomo (footballer), Italian footballer
- Nicola Bellomo (general) (1881–1945), Italian general
- Salvatore Bellomo (1951–2019), Belgian professional wrestler

== Other ==
- Bellomo Palace Regional Gallery
