= The Butterfly Clues =

2012 novel by Kate Ellison

- First edition
- Author: Kate Ellison
- Language: English
- Publisher: Egmont USA
- Publication date: 2012
- ISBN: 978-1-60684-263-8 (first edition, hardcover)
- LC Class: PZ7.E476485 But

The Butterfly Clues is a Young adult mystery novel written by Kate Ellison and published in February 2012 by Egmont USA. The Butterfly Clues tells the story of Penelope "Lo" Marin, an outcast teenage girl who struggles with Obsessive—compulsive disorder (OCD) and has to deal with the constant urge to steal various items, the frequent relocation due to her father's job, and the memory of her brother Oren's death. Throughout the novel, Lo's problems arise as both weaknesses and strengths, which she is forced to deal with as she attempts to solve the murder of a young stripper.

== Plot ==
The Butterfly Clues written by Kate Ellison, follows the story of Penelope “Lo” Marin and is set in Cleveland, Ohio. Before the novel starts, Lo's brother Oren ran away and was found dead in an abandoned apartment building in Neverland “the city of lost children”. Before Lo does anything she uses the sequences of multiples of threes and bananas for “security”. Lo is an outcast who takes items she sees as beautiful and arranges them in places “where everything makes sense”. Lo goes to Neverland and takes a marble angel for her collections. As she turns to leave for home Lo hears sirens behind her. Lo fears that someone saw her take the angel, so she hides in an alleyway beside “an ugly yellow house”. A shot is fired that kills Sapphire a “nineteen-year-old. . . stripper” who has “angry eyes, and her lips are a bruised blue-purple color — a lipstick” and lived in the yellow house. Lo decides to look into Sapphire's murder. Lo goes to a flea market in Neverland to look for more items for her collections and is bumped into a nearby stand by someone running past her. At the stand, Lo finds many of the Sapphire's belongings stolen when she was murdered. Lo steals a horse pendant and the owner of the stand (Mario) gives her a Sapphires butterfly figurine to keep her from telling the police about the stolen items.

Lo returns to Neverland to uncover more clues into Sapphire's life. She goes back to Sapphire's house to look for more clues and outside she meets the boy who pushed her into Mario's stand: Flynt. Together they break into Sapphire's "daisy-yellow house” and Lo takes three frog figurines, Sapphire's black rhinestone bustier, and her journals. While Lo looks around the house she sees pictures of Sapphire wearing her signature blue-purple lipstick, but Lo can't find the lipstick anywhere.

Lo's interest in the murder leads to Lo receiving her first threat: a dead cat on her front porch with a note attached that says “Now you know what curiosity did. Be careful, or you’ll end up like the cat”. The first threat brings Lo to realize that before she goes to Tens (the strip club where Sapphire worked) she will need a disguise, and thus Lo becomes Juliet from her mom's unused makeup, skirt, and heels. At Tens, Lo asks Sapphire's coworkers about her and they say that she was protective of her blue lipstick, but was nice to everyone. As she's leaving, Lo trips on a curtain and lands on a man's lap: Gordon Jones. The next day, Lo receives a second threat: eight pictures of her taped to her locker with acid on them to make them look like they were being consumed by flames with the warning: “Back off bitch” written across the pictures.

Lo goes looking for Mario and information of Sapphire's stolen items and finds him dying in his apartment. Lo returns to Tens to see if Mario and Sapphire's murders are related and learns from another one of Sapphire's coworkers that Sapphire was receiving gifts from a man. As Lo tries to leave, she is grabbed and shoved into a corner where a man tells her “This [is] your final warning. There won't be another one”. Lo goes to the police and tells them “about being pulled into a room in the back of the club by the bouncer, threatened — the cat, the acid. About Mario. All of it”, but they don't believe her because they think she's a drug addict. One police officer (Officer Gardner) believes Lo and tells her that Sapphire's lipstick Lo has been looking for what used to write “slut” across Sapphire's body. Lo's father asks her what the police officer was asking her and doesn't believe Lo when she tries to pass it off as “not important. Routine”. Lo runs from her house and finds herself back in Neverland. She calls her father to come pick her up and when they get home he goes to her room and “go[es] through [her] things...throwing them away”. When he finishes, Lo looks at Sapphire's broken butterfly and sees Sapphire's SIM card hidden inside. When Lo plugs the SIM card into her phone she finds threatening messages from Anchor and messages from Bird (Sapphire's boyfriend) and discovers that Bird is Oren.

Lo returns to Tens, and by using Sapphire's SIM card calls Anchor and learns that he is Gordon Jones. Jones kidnaps Lo. As Jones is about to kill her Officer Gardner and Flynt save her. Officer Gardner tells Lo that Sapphire was killed because she threatened Jones with publicizing his threats to her. Lo's father comes to pick Lo up from the police station and admits that Lo is an “amazing young woman”. His acceptance of Lo leads to Lo showing her father a letter from Oren before he died, which brings Lo and her father closer. Flynt and Lo decide to go to prom together where Lo finds her confidence and defends herself against the popular girl who said she didn't belong. Flynt shows Lo the “most beautiful thing [she's] ever seen”: a painting of herself which forces Lo to admit that she is beautiful.

== Characters ==
Penelope “Lo” Riley Marin, the shy, compulsive, and "kleptomaniacal" protagonist, has “almost black hair” and "pretty messed up family dynamics". Lo is an outcast in her school and her family. Has to deal with "constant relocation" and the death of her brother Oren.

Katherine “Sapphire”, was a confident stripper, who wore the same blue-purple lipstick everywhere.

Oren Riley Marin's “Bird”, was Lo's athletic brother with green eyes, was possessive of his room and especially his baseball hats.

Aaron Benjamin Greeley “Flynt”, is a mysterious and artistic runaway, who has “blue eyes and scraggly dreadlocked hair. Oddly nice teeth”.

Gordon Jones “Anchor”, is a rich businessman, who has “jet black hair, and big green eyes, and clean, square jaw”.

Mario, a “con artist” salesman at the flea market, has “Manic Panic” red hair and skin “leathery and full of lines”.

Officer Lucile Gardner, is “prettier than cops are supposed to be, [has] wavy black hair . . . and big, round eyes, so dark brown they almost look black”.

Penelope's father, is an overworked father, works late and doesn't often see Lo.

Penelope's mother, is a depressed mother, rarely gets out of bed. Smells like “coffee and medicine”.

Jeremy Theroux, is a boy in Lo's school, and likes her, “wears the same faded green Neil Young T-shirt and gray skinny jeans almost everyday”.

Keri Ram, is a girl Lo considers normal, has auburn hair and a “little ski-slope button nose”.

== Theme ==
The Butterfly Clues deals with the complexities associated with Obsessive—compulsive disorder (OCD). Lo's compulsive behaviors are “ever-present” throughout the novel. Lo is “drawn to multiples of three” and saying the word banana as a sense of “security”. Publishers Weekly notes that Lo's compulsions grow increasingly worse after the death of her brother Oren. Lo also has the urge to steal and hoard items that she “carefully organizes” in her room . Lo's hoarding grows worse into a “full-blown, potentially dangerous obsession". The people around Lo either react with “hostility” such as Lo's father or with “tenderness and understanding” such as Flynt does. Lo's family is “not accepting of her condition”, and Lo is an “outcast” in her school. While Lo's Obsessive—compulsive disorder “hinders her ability to gather clues” it's also the “force that compels her” to continue investigating Sapphire's murder.

== Style ==
The Butterfly Clues is noted for its use of a narrator (Lo) in the present tense and its “lyrical style”. The Butterfly Clues has a lyrical style and is written from Lo's perspective in the first-person narrative, which gives the book “a kind of tension and immediacy that keeps the mystery taunt”. Sadie Magazine and School Library Journal also remarked that The Butterfly Clues had a “strong”, “fast moving narrative”.

== Publication history ==
The Butterfly Clues was published by “Egmont USA in collaboration with Paper Lantern Lit”.

== Reception ==
The Butterfly Clues received mostly positive reviews in regards to its characters and plot. The Butterfly Clues is a “thrilling” and “unfolding” young adult, mystery novel written by Kate Ellison. Figment Reviews found the novel to have a unique and “anything but straightforward” plot with the romance that forms between Lo and Flynt to not be “forced”. Kirkus Reviews described the novel as “a pleasing mix of realism, tension, intrigue, and romance”. Sadie Magazine praised Kate Ellison for making her characters “believable” with “distinct voices” and that the narration was written with “magic and lyricism”. 365 Days of Reading commented that Sapphire “despite being dead was a well developed character.” Portrait of a Book noted that The Butterfly Clues was truly the “story of the characters” with “wonderful descriptions and insights”. 365 Days of Reading wrote that The Butterfly Clues would not be as good “if [Lo] was an ordinary girl. School Library Journal and Kirkus Reviews agreed that The Butterfly Clues is plotted well. Though 365 Days of Reading stated that The Butterfly Clues was “a bit confusing at first,” School Library Journal and 365 Days of Reading agreed that The Butterfly Clues has a “satisfying” and “riveting” conclusion. 365 Days of Reading also noted that the answers to the mystery were revealed to the reader at “just the right rate”. Publishers Weekly added that Ellison created “credible (if slightly romanticized)” perspectives of both Neverland and Lo's struggle with Obsessive—compulsive disorder that makes her a “memorable heroine”.

Not all of The Butterfly Clues reviews were positive. 365 Days of Reading complained that “characters are where the [novel] suffers a bit,” because Lo seems “controlled by her condition” that she is not an easily relatable protagonist and that it was difficult to decide which characters should be trusted. 365 Days of Reading also criticized that while they found Flynt “perplexing” they were not able to “buy into [him] as a genuine person”. Kirkus Reviews reprimanded Ellison because they feel that Lo confronts clues “a bit too often to be believed”.

== Bibliography ==
- Ellison, Kate (2012). The Butterfly Clues. New York: Egmont USA. pp. 325. ISBN 978-1-60684-263-8.
