= Snooky =

Snooky may refer to:

== People ==
- Eileen "Snooky" Bellomo, American singer and former backup vocalist for the band Blondie
- Snooky Lanson, stage name of Roy Landman (1914–1990), an American singer
- Snooky Pryor (1921–2006), an American blues harp player
- Snooky Serna (b. 1966), a Filipina film and television actress
- Snooky Young (1919–2011), an American jazz trumpeter

== Other uses ==
- "Snooky Wookums", fictional feline from animated television series Krypto the Superdog (TV series)

== See also ==
- Snooker, a cue sport
- Snooki, nickname of Nicole Polizzi (b. 1987), an American reality television personality
