= Ted Kooshian =

American jazz musician

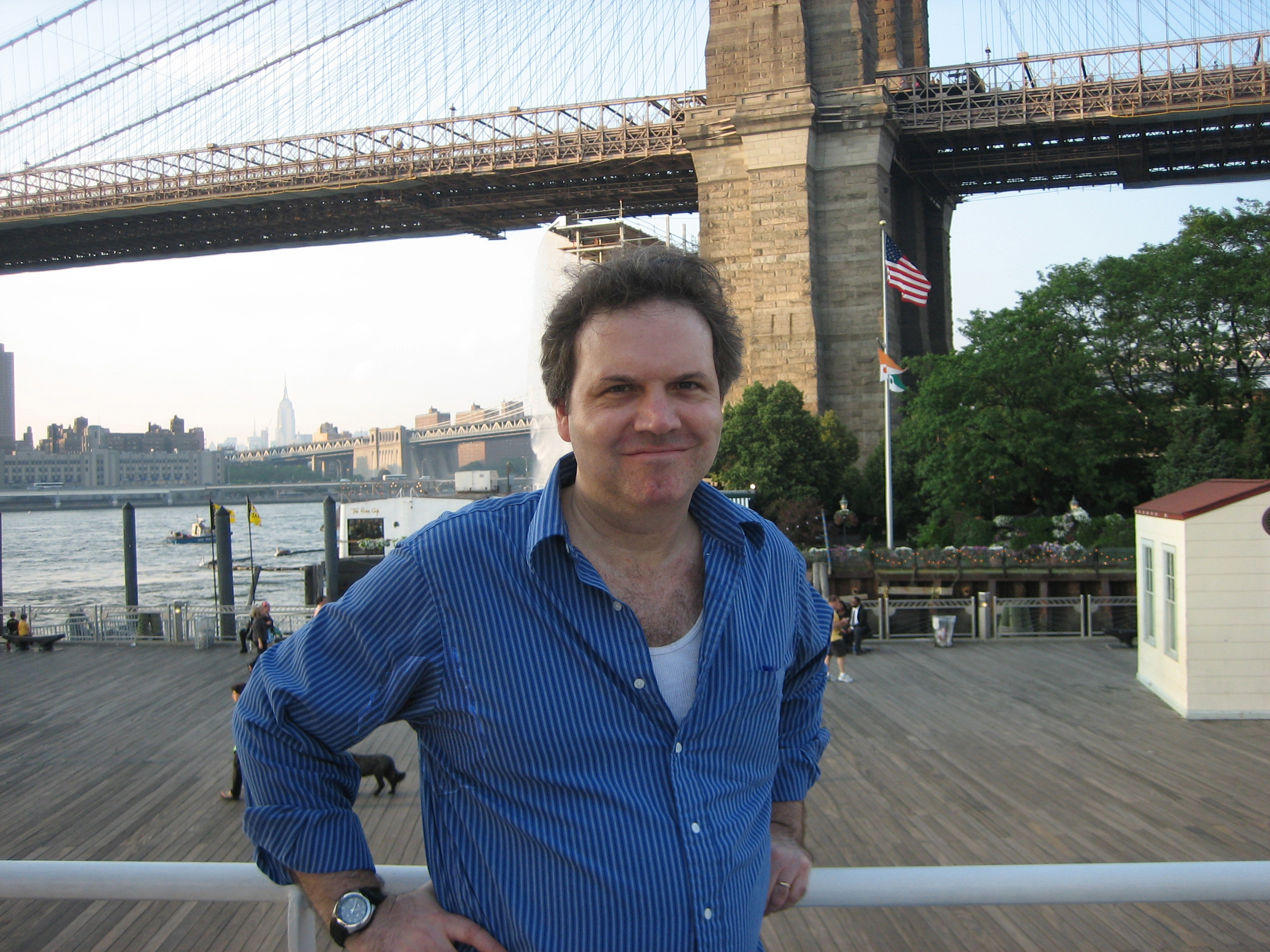
Ted Kooshian outside Bargemusic in Brooklyn, New York (26 June 2008)

Ted Kooshian (born October 8, 1961) is an American jazz pianist, keyboardist, and composer who has performed with Aretha Franklin, Chuck Berry, Marvin Hamlisch, Edgar Winter, Sarah Brightman, Il Divo, and Blood, Sweat, and Tears. Kooshian has played in many Broadway pit orchestras, and has been a member of the Ed Palermo Big Band since 1994. Originally from San Jose, California, Kooshian has been performing since the 1980s.

He has released five albums: Clockwork (2004), Ted Kooshian's Standard Orbit Quartet (Summit, 2008), Underdog, and Other Stories... (Summit, 2009), Clowns Will Be Arriving (Summit, 2015), and Hubub! (Summit, 2022).

== Discography ==
- Clockwork (2004)
- Ted Kooshian's Standard Orbit Quartet (Summit, 2008)
- Underdog, and Other Stories... (Summit, 2009)
- Clowns Will Be Arriving (Summit, 2015)
- Hubub! (Summit, 2022)

With Ed Palermo Big Band

- Plays the Music of Frank Zappa
- Take Your Clothes Off When You Dance
- Eddy Loves Frank
- Oh No! Not Jazz!!
- Electric Butter
- It's An Ed Palermo Christmas!
- One Child Left Behind
- The Great Un-American Songbook, Vol's 1 and 2
- The Adventures Of Zodd Zundgren
- A Lousy Day In Harlem
- The Great Un-American Songbook, Vol III
- I've Got News For You: The Music of Edgar Winter
- PROG vs FUSION: a War of the Ages

With Judy Barnett

- Swingin
- The Road to my Heart
- Too Darn Hot
- Lust Loss Love

With Rick Wald

- Aural Hieroglyphics
- Castaneda's Dreams
- Play That Thing

With Scott Whitfield

- Speaking of Love
- A Bi-Coastal Christmas, Vol. 1

With others

- Andrew Atwill – Short Stories Vol 1 & 2
- Augie Haas – A 2020 Christmas
- Brett Gold New York Jazz Orchestra – Dreaming Big
- Michael Andrew – A Swingerhead Christmas
- Pete McGuinness – Voice Like a Horn
- Swear and Shake – Maple Ridge
- Art Lillard's Heavenly Big Band – Certain Relationships
- Christopher Saunders – Curtain Call
- Alexis P. Suter Band – Just Another Fool
- Ray Marchica – A Different View
