= Ed Palermo Big Band =

American big band

The Ed Palermo Big Band
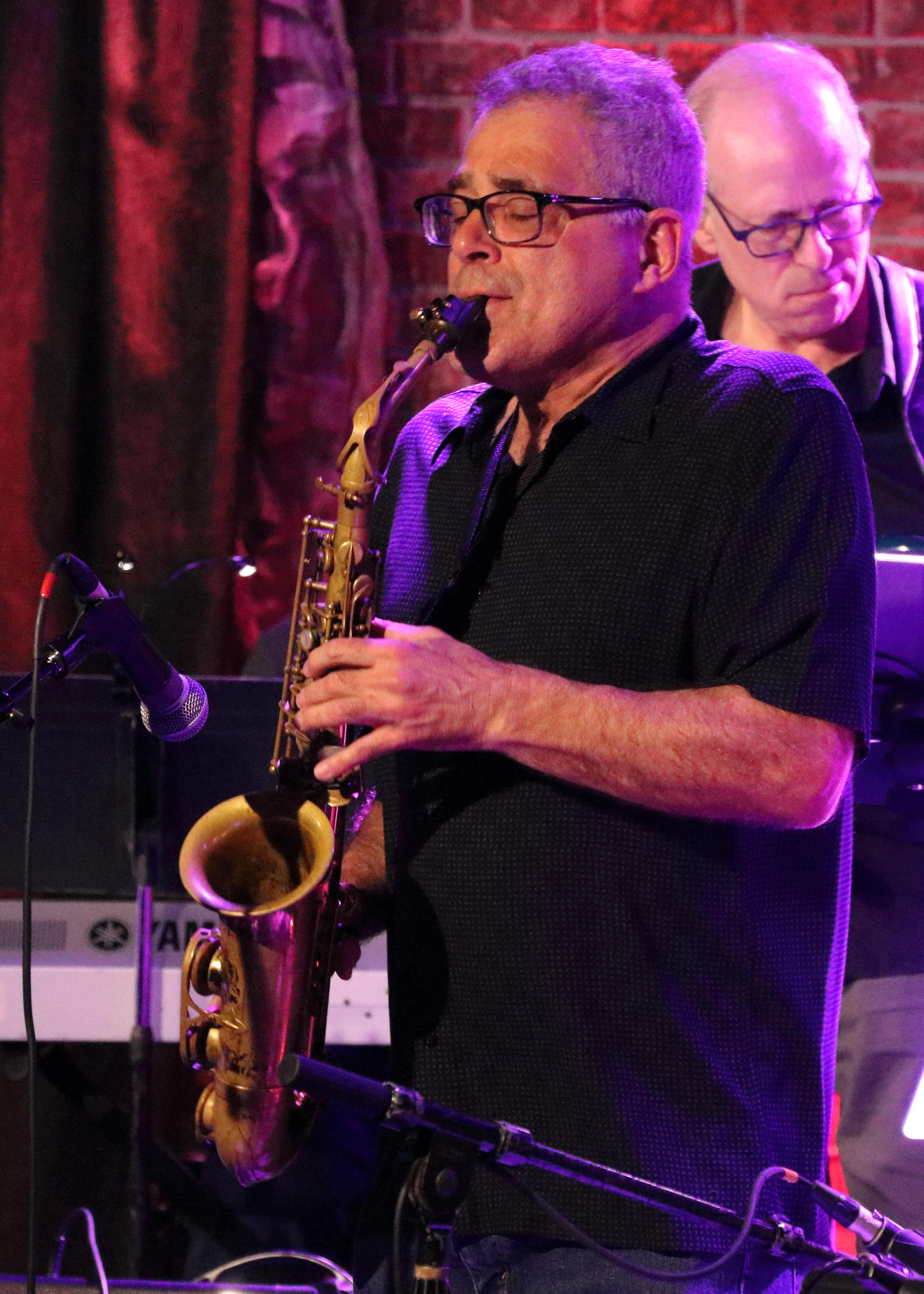
- Palermo at Iridium 2018

Background information
- Genres: Jazz; blues; swing
- Years active: 1977–present
- Labels: Vile Heifer, Pro Jazz, Astor Place, Cuneiform, Sky Cat Records
- Members: Ed Palermo; Ronnie Buttacavoli; Steve Jankowski; Charlie Gordon; Matt Ingman; Mike Boschen; Cliff Lyons; Phil Chester; Ben Kono; Bill Straub; Barbara Cifelli; Bob Quaranta; Ted Kooshian; Paul Adamy; Ray Marchica; Bruce McDaniel; Katie Jacoby; Daniel Pearson; Drew Vandewinckel; Dan Glaude; Emily Pecoraro; Augie Haas; Nick Grinder; Matt Owens
- Website: www.palermobigband.com

The Ed Palermo Big Band is a New York City-based ensemble that has been active since the late 1970s, playing the compositions and arrangements of their leader, New Jersey born saxophonist Ed Palermo. The band is best known for Palermo's arrangements of the music of Frank Zappa, but they also perform and record compositions by Todd Rundgren, The Beatles, Miles Davis, Wayne Shorter, The Rolling Stones, Blodwyn Pig, King Crimson, Jethro Tull and many, many other composers from a wide range of genres.

== Ed Palermo ==
Ed Palermo started playing the alto saxophone and the guitar in high school. Early influences that pushed him in that direction were the Beatles and the Mothers of Invention. Palermo also discovered a love for the music of Edgar Winter while in high school. This inspired him to emulate musicians such as Cannonball Adderley, Phil Woods, and Charlie Parker. In college he switched from alto saxophone to tenor saxophone due to influences from John Coltrane, Michael Brecker, and David Liebman. After graduating college, Palermo moved to New York in order to become a jazz tenor saxophonist. At this point, an album called "Impact" by Charles Tolliver inspired him to try his hand at arranging. Palermo looked to his friend Dave LaLama, already an arranger, for advice and he began to compose and arrange music. Soon he began playing with Tito Puente, and during this time, assembled a group which later expanded into the big band bearing his name.

== Early years ==
In 1977, Ed Palermo assembled a nine-piece band to play his own compositions. The small group expanded into a big band and began a three-year residency at a New York club called Seventh Avenue South. During this time the band played primarily compositions by its leader along with his arrangements of other music. After three years, they were replaced by Gil Evans.

In 1982, they recorded their first LP and released it as Ed Palermo under a label called Vile Heifer. Later the LP became known as Papier Mache after the first song on the album. This LP featured guests such as Randy Brecker, David Sanborn, and Edgar Winter. The material on this album was mostly Palermo's original work, except for a few pieces that were co-written.

Due to the hassle involved in producing an album under one's own label, the Ed Palermo Big Band did not release another album until a record company showed interest. This happened in 1987. Ping Pong was released by Pro Jazz Records and featured much different material from the first album. This album featured less complicated music and more swing. From 1987 to 1993 the band alternated performing at the clubs Visiones and the Bitter End.

== Recent years ==
After Frank Zappa's death in 1993, Palermo decided to play a show of all Frank Zappa music. Before the show, Palermo posted a notice on an internet bulletin board. The turnout to the show was the largest that the Ed Palermo Big Band had had to date.

"Up until then, my own shows at The Bitter End were drawing next to nobody," said Palermo. "For some reason, the word got out about the Zappa show and the place was swamped. And it was incredibly exciting—people there were Zappa fanatics."

The idea was for only one tribute concert. But the band was contacted by Alan Pepper of The Bottom Line which led to a nine-year residency. For these shows they played primarily arrangements (done by Ed himself) of Frank Zappa songs, however, each show was different from the one before. The band often featured special guests at these shows such as Zappa alums Mike Keneally and Ike Willis.

They recorded their first Zappa album in 1997, The Ed Palermo Big Band Plays the Music of Frank Zappa, also known as Big Band Zappa, was released on Astor Place.

After nine years at The Bottom Line (1994–2003) they took a break from regular shows for a period of about a year. After that they began another series of regular shows at the Iridium Jazz Club in New York City. Since late 2018 the band acquired a monthly residency at Iridium playing a variety of musical genres and composers with a penchant for Frank Zappa.

In 2006. they released their second CD, Take Your Clothes Off When You Dance under the label of Cuneiform Records. In 2009 the group released their third CD, Eddy Loves Frank, also on Cuneiform. In February 2014, OH NO!! NOT JAZZ!! was released to rave reviews, including a four-star review in DownBeat Magazine. In 2015, the band released the album One Child Left Behind, featuring Napoleon Murphy Brock and Frank Zappa's sister Candy Zappa. In 2016, the band released the albums The Great Un-American Songbook, Volumes 1 & 2, also featuring Napoleon Murphy Brock, which also received a 4-star review from DownBeat Magazine.. Volume 3 will be released in 2020. Eddy Loves Frank, Oh No!! Not Jazz!!, One Child Left Behind, and The Great Un-American Songbook were all produced by the band's guitarist & vocalist, Bruce McDaniel. The next album was another well-reviewed release called The Adventures of Zodd Zundgren (Cuneiform 2017), a reinvention of the music Frank Zappa and Todd Rundgren. "The Adventures of Zodd Zundgren is big, irresistible fun." - Karl Ackermann, All About Jazz. The band's latest is a jazz album titled A Lousy Day in Harlem (Sky Cat 2019). Palermo returns to his jazz roots with a combination of covers and original compositions. "Twenty-first century big-band music doesn’t get more exciting and impressive than this." - Jeff Tamarkin, JazzTimes

Palermo teaches music at Hoff/Barthelson in Scarsdale, New York. In 2018, Ed's band was "third best band on the rise" in Downbeat Poll's Rising Star category.

== Members ==
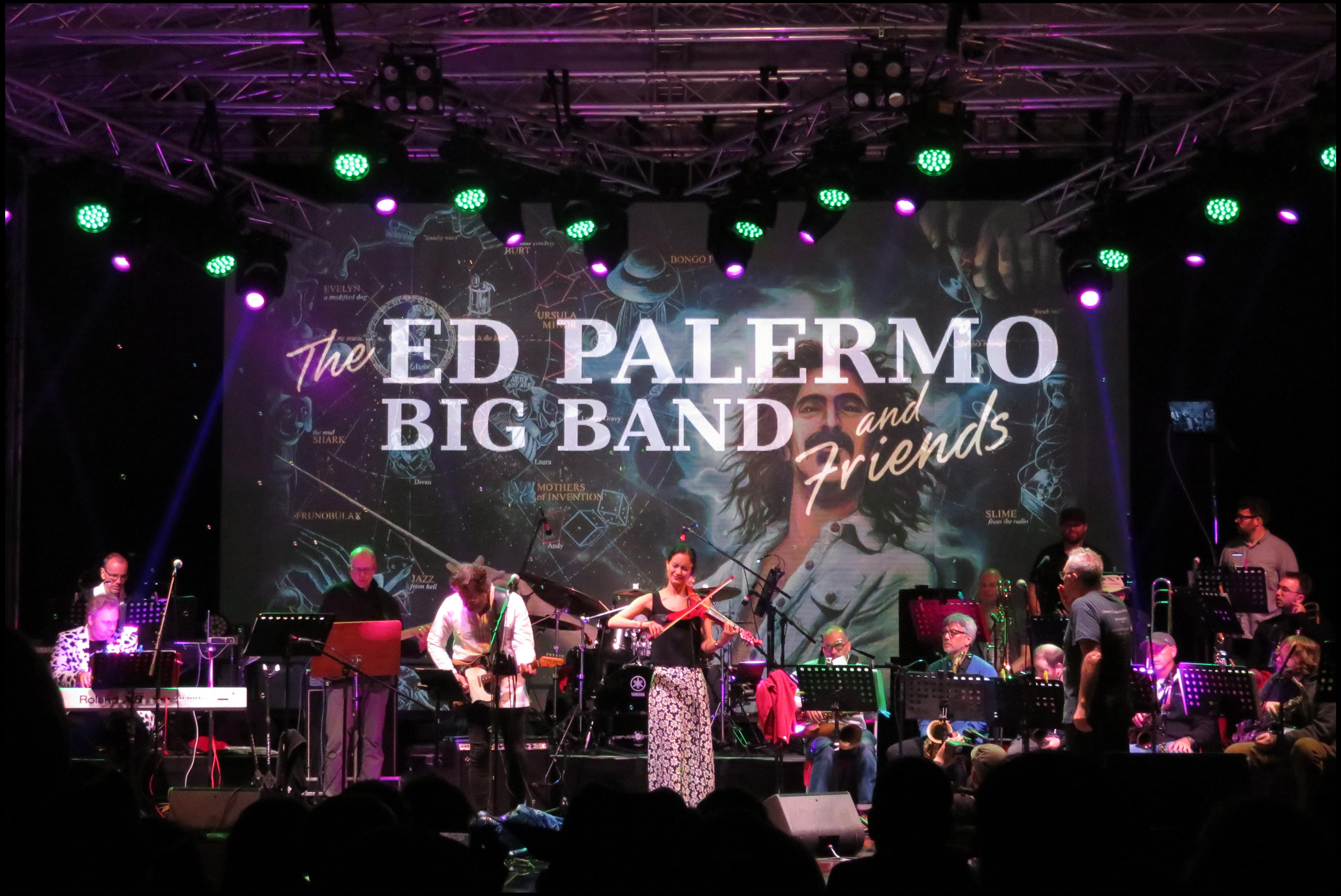
ZAPPANALE #30 Bad Doberan, Germany 2019

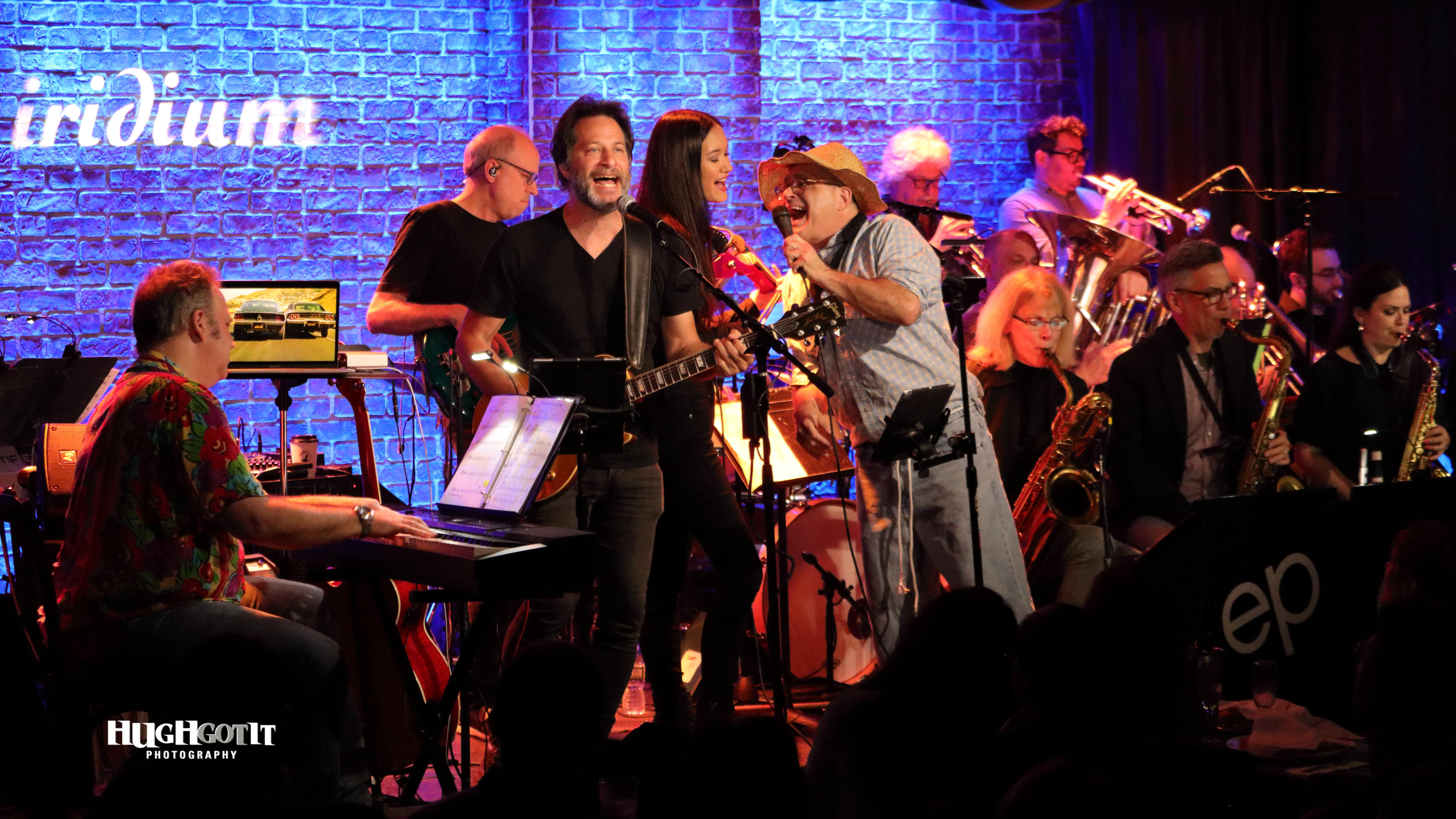
Palermo Big Band Iridium April 2019

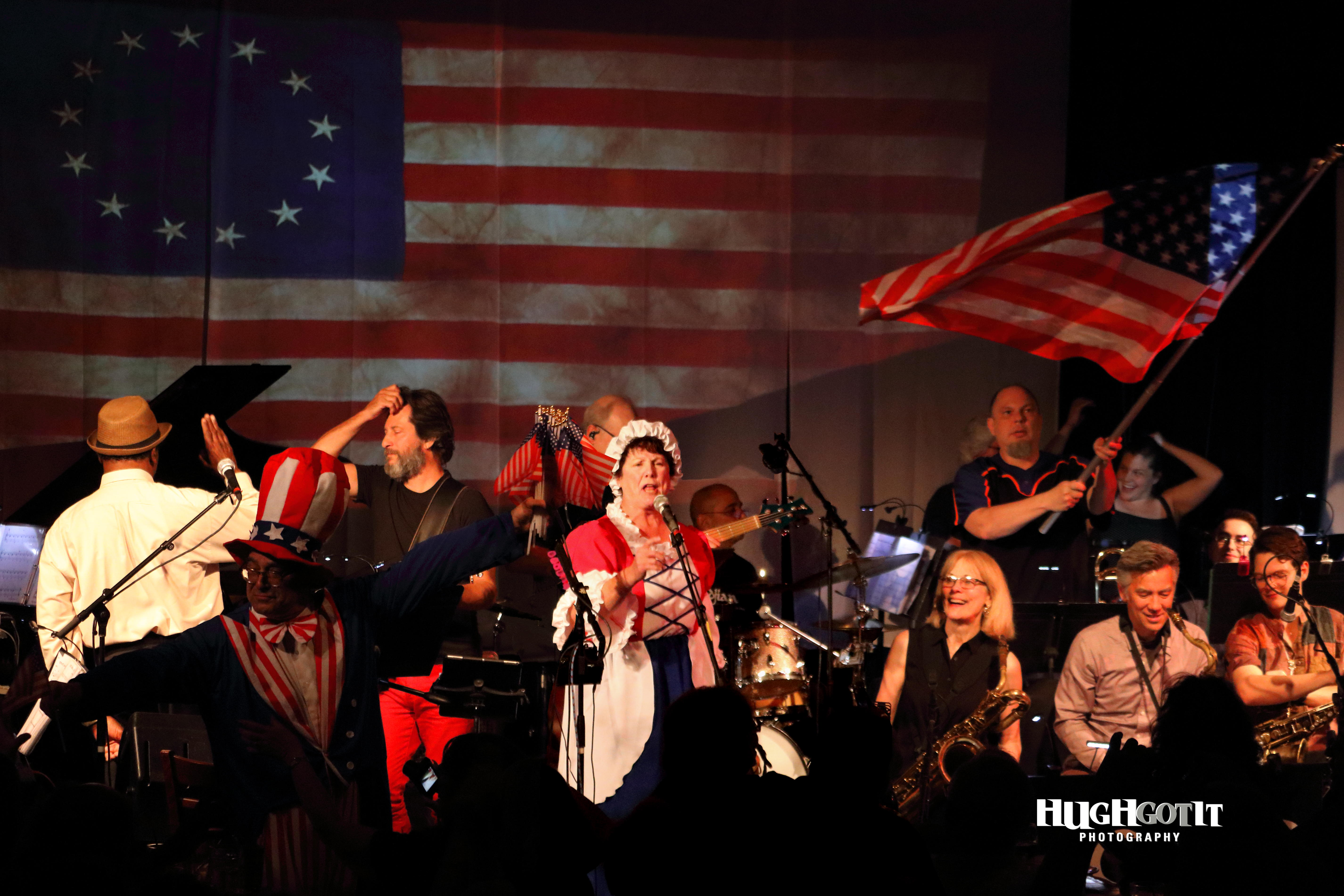
AMERICANA at The Falcon, Marlboro, New York

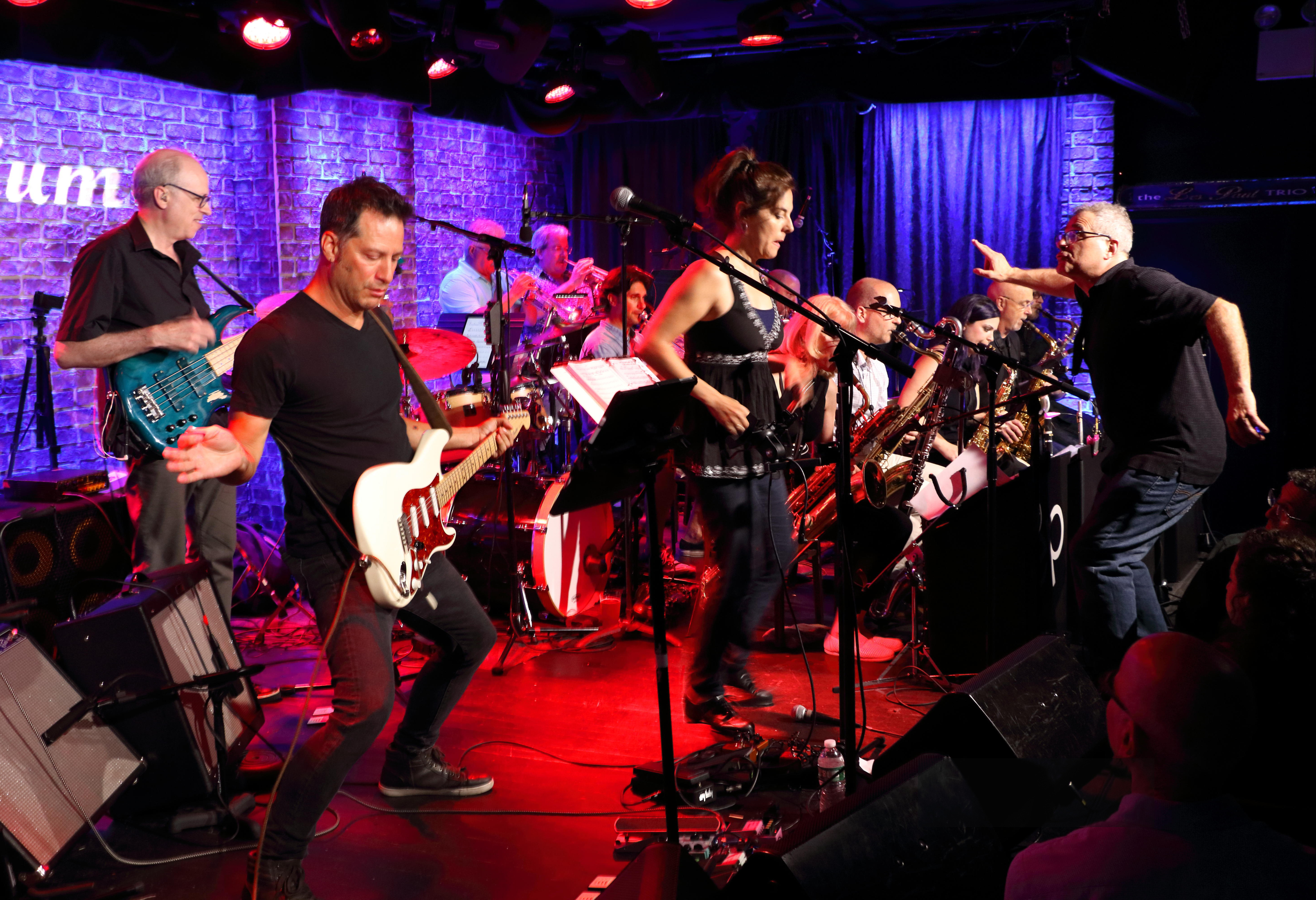
Nicki Denner tap-dancing to Frank Zappa's Echidna's Arf

Current

Name	Instrument(s)
Ed Palermo	Arranger, Alto Saxophone, Guitar, Vocals
Ronnie Buttacavoli	Trumpet (lead)
Charley Gordon	Trombone (lead)
Mike Boschen	Trombone
Matt Ingman	Bass Trombone, Tuba
Cliff Lyons	Alto Saxophone, Clarinet
Phil Chester	Alto Saxophone, Soprano Saxophone, Clarinet, Flute
Ben Kono	Tenor Saxophone, Flute
Bill Straub	Tenor Saxophone, Clarinet
Barbara Cifelli	Baritone Saxophone
Bob Quaranta	Acoustic Piano
Ted Kooshian	Keyboards
Paul Adamy	Bass Guitar
Ray Marchica	Drums
Bruce McDaniel	Electric Guitar, Acoustic Guitar, Vocals, Arranger
Katie Jacoby	Violin, Vocals

Additional musicians/performers

Name	Instrument(s)
Daniel Pearson	Baritone Sax
Bill Todd	Saxophone
Dan Glaude	Saxophone
Drew Vandewinckel	Saxophone
Emily Pecoraro	Saxophone
Augie Haas	Trumpet
Matt Owens	Trumpet
Nick Grinder	Trombone
Jim Lutz	Trombone
Nina Hennessey	Vocals
Mike James	Vocals
Susan Palermo	Vocals
Lee Finkelstein	Drums
Dave Edwards	Bass
Nicki Denner	Tap Dancing
Anton Denner	Saxophone
Kathleen Doran	Trumpet
Jack Davis	Trombone

Former musicians

Name	Instrument(s)
Laurie Frink	Trumpet
John Bailey	Trumpet
Joe Fiedler	Trombone
John Hines	Trumpet
Scott Harrow	Saxophone
Allan Firfer	Saxophone
Dave Rickenberg	Saxophone
Aaron Hyke	Saxophone
Tim Sessions	Trombone
Joe Meo	Saxophone
Michael Boscarino	Trombone
Jenny Hill	Saxophone
Chris Olness	Trombone
Tim Sessions	Trombone
Al Hunt	Saxophone
Chuck Fischer	Saxophone
Tommy Igoe	Drums
Dale Kirkland	Trombone
Darryl Shaw	Trumpet
Liesl Sagartz Whitaker	Trumpet
Eugene Rockwell	Vocals
Jack Schatz	Trombone
Erick Storckman	Trombone
Jim Pugh	Trombone
Chuck Wilson	Saxophone
Bud Burridge	Trumpet
Dan Levine	Trombone
Jeff Lederer	Saxophone
Pete McGuiness	Trombone
Jeff Holmes	Trumpet
Elaine Burt	Trumpet
Taylor Haskins	Trumpet
Nick Finzer	Trombone
Tony D'Agostino	Drums
Ross Pederson	Drums
Karl Lyden	Trombone
Mat Jodrell	Trumpet
Peter Anderson	Saxophone
Matt Haviland	Trombone
Daniel Linden	Trombone
David Smith	Trumpet

Guests

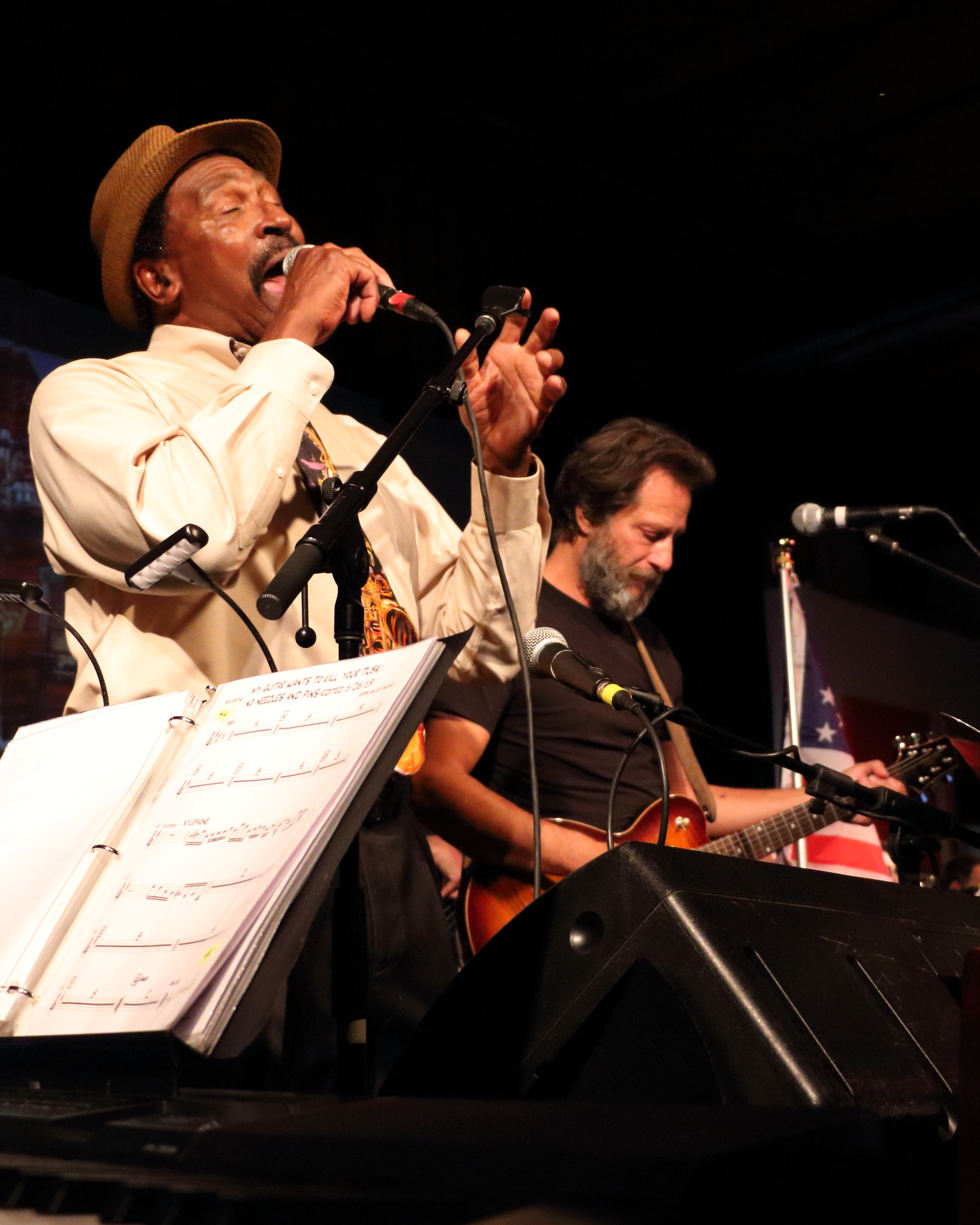
Napoleon Murphy Brock at The Falcon 2019

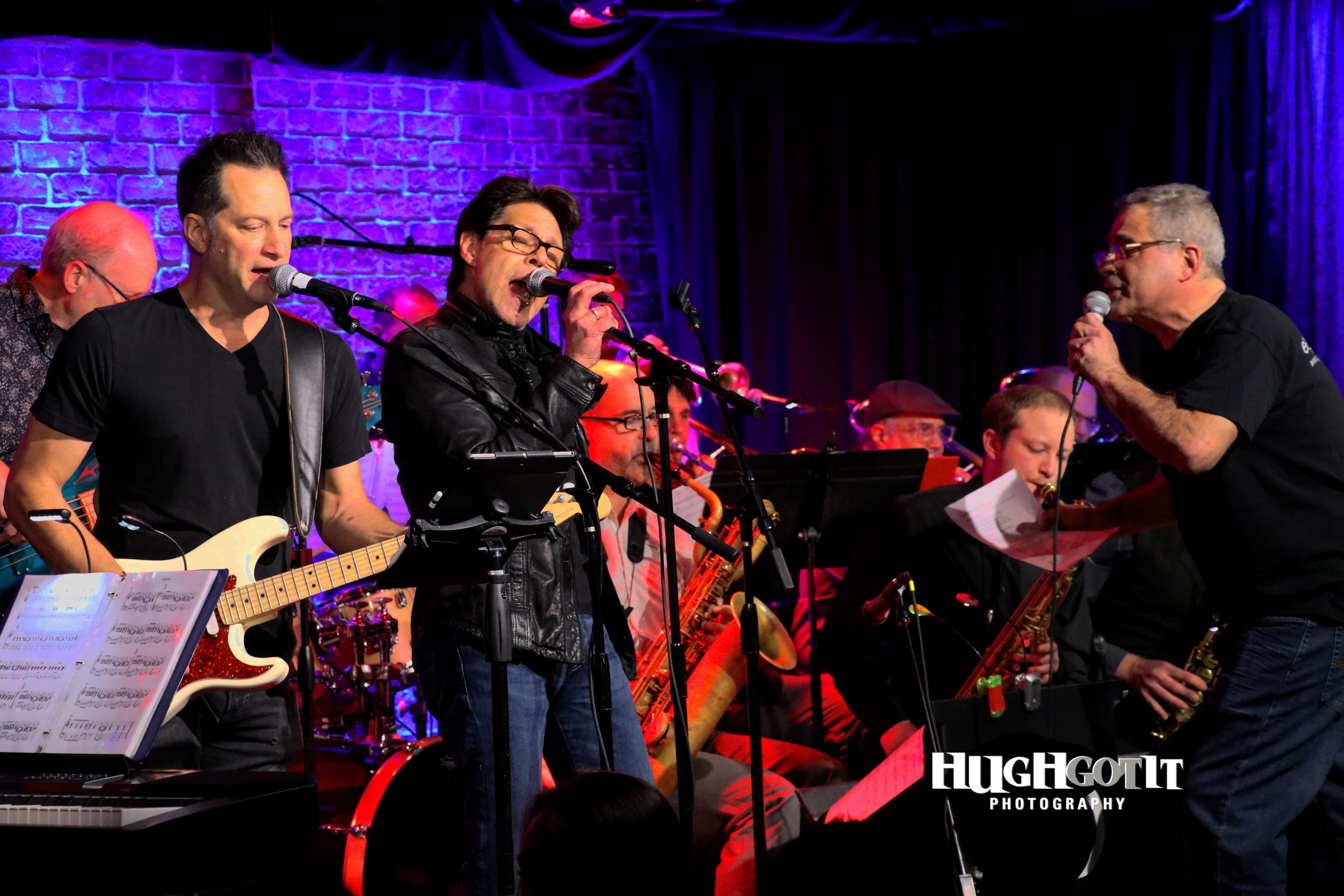
Kasim Sultan at Iridium 2018

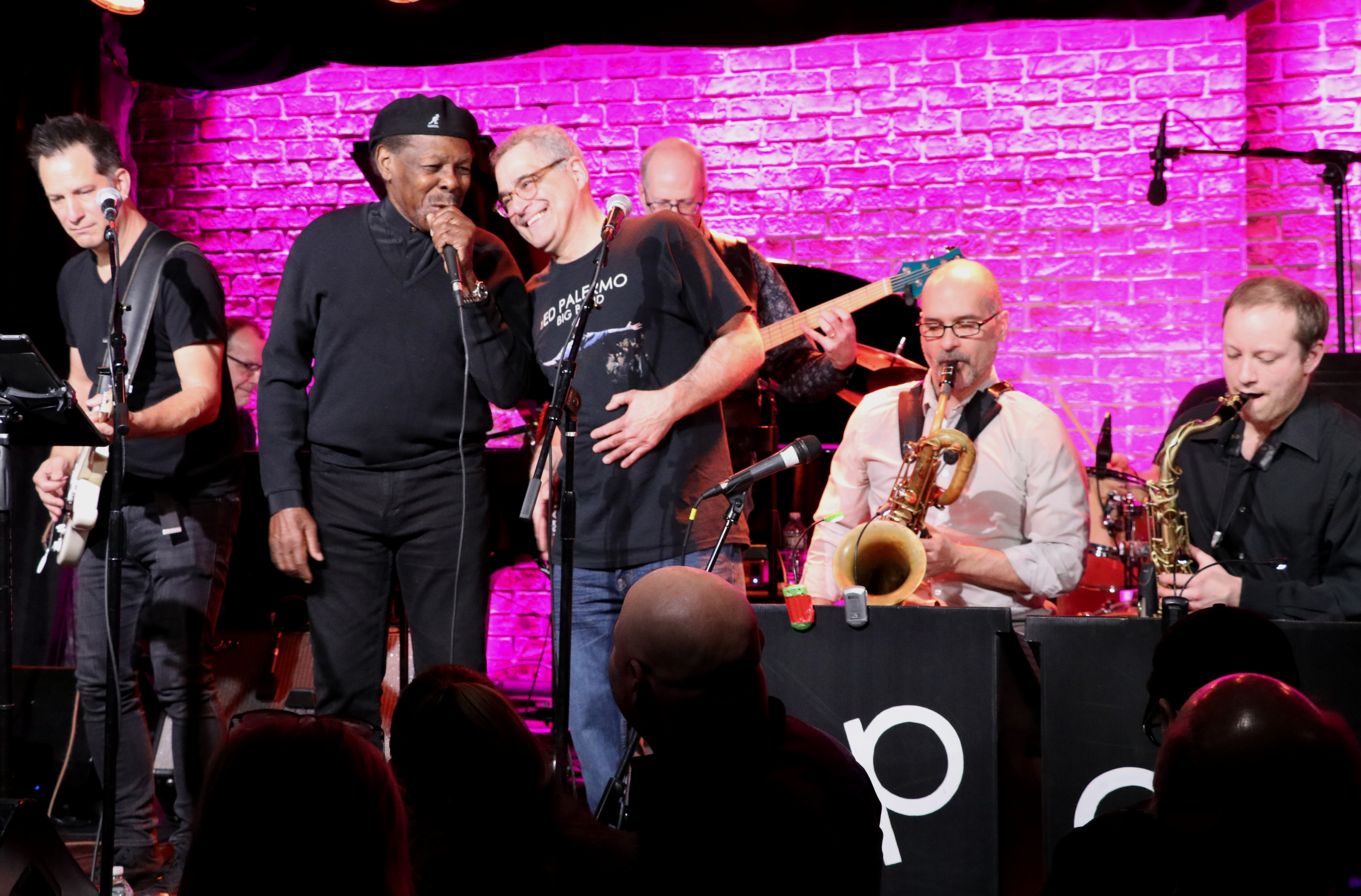
Lloyd Price at Iridium

- Ed Alstrom
- Jimmy Carl Black
- Russ Bonagura
- Tom Bowes
- Napoleon Murphy Brock
- Harvey Brooks
- Felix Cabrera
- Jim Clouse
- Steve Cropper
- Nicki Denner
- Perry Gardner
- Dave Glenn
- Wycliffe Gordon
- Thana Harris
- Nina Hennessy
- Mike James
- Mike Keneally
- John Korba
- Ryan Krewer
- Jimmy Leahey
- Will Lee
- Howard Levy
- Gary Lucas
- Deb Lyons
- Mats & Morgan
- Jenna McSwain
- Mark Naftalin
- George Naha
- Gary Oleyar
- Rob Paparozzi
- Lloyd "Mr. Personality" Price
- Elliott Randall
- Carl Restivo
- Todd Rundgren
- Catherine Russell
- David Sanborn
- Rick Savage
- John Sebastian
- Mike Stern
- Kasim Sulton
- John Tabacco
- Vaneese Thomas
- Jimmy Vivino
- Denny Walley
- Ray White
- Ike Willis
- Edgar Winter
- Candy Zappa

== Discography ==
Papier Mache (Released as "Ed Palermo")

1982 Vile Heifer

Song title	Featured soloist(s)
"Papier Mache"	Edgar Winter (Alto Sax and Organ)
"Complete Control"	Ed Palermo (Alto Sax), Kim Plainfield (Drums), Bob Quaranta (Piano)
"Before Max"	Ed Palermo (Alto Sax), Randy Brecker (Trumpet)
"Dusty"	Jim Clouse (Soprano Sax)
"Different People Differently"	Dave Glenn (Trombone)
"An Escape Nonetheless"	David Sanborn (Alto Sax)

Ping Pong

1987 Pro Jazz Records

Song title	Featured soloist(s)
"Ping Pong"	Rick Savage (Trumpet)
"All Out"	Ed Palermo (Alto Sax)
"3 Views of a Secret"	Chuck Wilson (Alto Sax)
"Who's the Goose"	Rick Savage (Trumpet)
"Ratphobia"	Bud Burridge (Trumpet)
"Mood for Maude"	Matt Finders (Trombone)
"Darkness"	Tom Malone (Trombone)
"Perry Mason"	Chuck Wilson (Alto Sax)
"Goodnight"	Al Hunt (Oboe)
"Bitch's Crystal"	Bob Quaranta (Piano)
"Your Spleen Perhaps"	Ed Palermo (Alto Sax)
"I.G.Y."	Jim Clouse (Tenor Sax)

The Ed Palermo Big Band Plays the Music of Frank Zappa (aka Big Band Zappa)

1997 Astor Place Records

Song title	Featured soloist(s)
"Peaches en Regalia"	Mike Keneally (Guitar)
"Toads of the Short Forest"	Bob Mintzer (Tenor Sax), Ed Palermo (Alto Sax), Ted Kooshian (Organ)
"Who Are the Brain Police?"/ "Holiday in Berlin (Excerpt)"	Mike Stern (Guitar)
"Twenty Small Cigars"	Dave Samuels (Vibraphone)
"King Kong"	Bob Mintzer (Tenor Sax)
"Aybe Sea" / "Inca Roads (Excerpt)"	Mike Keneally (Guitar)
"Waka Jawaka" / "Son of Orange County (Excerpt)"	Chris Potter (Tenor Sax)
"Sofa No. 1"	Ed Palermo (Alto Sax), Dave Samuels (Vibraphone)
"The Little House I Used to Live In" / "Mother People (Excerpt)"	Mike Stern (Guitar)
"Heavy Duty Judy" / "Grand Wazoo (Excerpt)"	Ray Marchica (Drums), Ed Palermo (Alto Sax)
"Carnival of the Animals (Finale)"	Ted Kooshian (Keyboard), Bob Quaranta (Keyboard)
"We Are Not Alone"	Mike Stern (Guitar), Mike Keneally (Guitar), Ed Palermo (Guitar)
"wai, fn?"	

Take Your Clothes Off When You Dance

2006 Cuneiform Records

Song title	Featured soloist(s)
"RDNZL"	Ed Palermo (Alto Sax), Charles Gordon (Trombone), Bob Quaranta (Piano), Ted Kooshian (Synthesizer), Ray Marchica (Drums)
"Take Your Clothes Off When You Dance"	Joe Fiedler (Trombone), Ben Kono (Tenor Sax)
"Dwarf Nebula Procession March & Dwarf Nebula"	Cliff Lyons (Alto Sax)
"Pound for a Brown on the Bus"	Ray Marchica (Drums), Ed Palermo (Alto Sax), Ted Kooshian (Synthesizer), Bill Straub (Tenor Sax)
"Sleep Dirt"	Phil Chester (Soprano Sax)
"Gumbo Variations"	Dave Riekenberg (Tenor Sax), Carl Restivo (Guitar)
"Mom and Dad" / "Oh No"	Carl Restivo (Vocals), Ed Palermo (Alto Sax)
"Moggio"	Ted Kooshian (Synthesizer), Bob Quaranta (Piano), Ray Marchica (Drums)

Eddy Loves Frank

2009 Cuneiform Records

Song title	Featured soloist(s)
"Night School"	Ed Palermo (Alto Sax)
"Echidna's Arf (Of You)"	Cliff Lyons (Alto Sax), Bill Straub (Tenor Sax), Charles Gordon (Trombone), John Hines (Trumpet)
"Regyptian Strut"	Phil Chester (Soprano Sax), Joe Fiedler (Trombone)
"Don't You Ever Wash That Thing?"	Ben Kono (Tenor Sax), Ray Marchica (Drums), Ted Kooshian (Synthesizer), Ed Palermo (Alto Sax), Bruce McDaniel(Guitar)
"Dupree's Paradise"	Bob Quaranta (Piano)
"What's New in Baltimore"	Bob Quaranta (Piano), Ben Kono (Tenor Sax)
"Let's Move to Cleveland"	Ted Kooshian (Synthesizer), Ronnie Buttacavoli (Trumpet)
"America the Beautiful"	Ted Kooshian (Synthesizer), Bruce McDaniel (Lead Vocals)

ELECTRIC BUTTER - ROB PAPAROZZI and THE ED PALERMO BIG BAND "A Musical Tribute to Paul Butterfield and Michael Bloomfield"

2014 Jankland Recording

Song title	Soloist and special guest(s)
"Killing Floor"	Jimmy Vivino (lead guitar), Bill Straub (tenor sax)
"Walkin' Blues"	Jimmy Leahey (slide guitar), Ed Alstrom (B3)
"Another Country"	
"Drivin' Wheel"	Mark Naftalin (B3 organ), George Naha (guitar solo)
"Texas"	Harvey Brooks (bass), George Naha (guitar solo)
"Walking by Myself"	Jimmy Leahey (lead guitar solo), Bob Quaranta (piano), Cliff Lyons (alto sax)
"Wine"	George Naha (guitar solo), John Korba (piano fills and B3 organ)
"One More Heartache"	Jimmy Leahey (slide guitar and guitar solo)
"You Don't Realize"	Steve Cropper (guitar-right side), George Naha (guitar-left side)
"Lovin' Cup"	Ben Kono (tenor sax), Ronnie Buttacavoli (trumpet), Joe Fiedler (trombone), Ted Kooshian (organ)
"Love Disease"	Ed Palermo (alto sax solo)
"Drifting Blues"	Mark Naftalin (piano solo and B3 organ), Cliff Lyons (alto sax), George Naha (guitar)
"Work Song"	Ed Palermo (original arrangement)
"Everything's Gonna Be Alright"	Barbara Cifelli (baritone sax), Charley Gordon (trombone), John Bailey (trumpet)
"Buried Alive in the Blues"	

OH NO!! NOT JAZZ!!

2014 Cuneiform Records

DISC 1 ZAPPA

Song title	Featured soloist(s)
"INCA ROADS"	vocals: Napoleon Murphy Brock; solos: Bruce McDaniel (guitar), Ed Palermo (alto sax), Bob Quaranta (piano)
"THE UNCLE MEAT VARIATIONS"	solo: Bruce McDaniel (guitar)
"LITTLE UMBRELLAS"	solo: Charley Gordon (trombone)
"THE DOG BREATH VARIATIONS"	solos: Joe Fiedler (trombone), Phil Chester (soprano sax)
"CHUNGA'S REVENGE"	solo: Katie Jacoby (violin)
"LUMPY GRAVY"	solos: Ronnie Buttacavoli (trumpet), Bill Straub (tenor sax)
"THE BLACK PAGE"	solo: Cliff Lyons (alto sax)
"AMERICA DRINKS AND GOES HOME"	vocals: Mike James; solos: Phil Chester (soprano sax), Bill Straub (tenor sax)

DISC 2 PALERMO

Song title	Featured soloist(s)
"MOOSH"	solos: Katie Jacoby (violin), Ed Palermo (alto sax)
"PRELUDE TO AN INSULT"	solos: Barbara Cifelli (bari sax), Ed Palermo (alto sax)
"WHY IS THE DOCTOR BARKING?"	solo: Ted Kooshian (organ)
"PRELUDE TO A CATASTROPHE"	solo: John Palermo (mandolin)
"A CATASTROPHE (IS JUST AROUND THE CORNER)"	solo: Ben Kono (tenor sax)
"LET'S REPRODUCE"	solo: Ray Marchica (drums)
"AN ESCAPE NONETHELESS"	solo: Bill Straub (soprano sax)
"NOSTALGIA REVISITED (for Susan)"	solo: Ed Palermo (alto sax)
"THE INSULT"	solo: Ed Palermo (alto sax)
"GOOD NIGHT, EVERYBODY! GOD LOVE YA!"	solo: Charley Gordon (trombone)
"SHE'S SO HEAVY"	solos: John Hines (trumpet), Joe Fiedler (trombone)

One Child Left Behind

2016 Cuneiform Records

Song title	Featured soloist(s)
"CLETUS AWREETUS AWRIGHTUS"	solos: Ted Kooshian (tack piano), Bill Straub (frenetic tenor sax stylings)
"DIRTY WHITE BUCKS"	solo: John Bailey (trumpet)
"SPIDER OF DESTINY"	featuring Katie Jacoby (violin)
"SCARFACE"	solo: Katie Jacoby (violin)
"GRAND WAZOO"	
"FIFTY-FIFTY"	solos: Mike Boschen (trombone), Barbara Cifelli (baritone sax), Cliff Lyons (alto sax), Bob Quaranta (piano)
"THE INSULT"	
"HARVEST MOON"	vocals: Bruce McDaniel; solo: Charley Gordon (trombone)
"PYGMY TWYLYTE"	vocals: Napoleon Murphy Brock
"PO-JAMA PEOPLE"	vocals: Napoleon Murphy Brock; solo: Ed Palermo (alto sax)
"KIKO AND THE LAVENDER MOON"	vocals: Candy Zappa; solo: Charley Gordon (trombone)
"VENGEANCE"	solo: Ben Kono (tenor sax)
"EVELYN, A MODIFIED DOG"	vocals: Candy Zappa
"VILLAGE OF THE SUN"	vocals: Jenna McSwain
"THE GOAT PATROL"	solo: John Bailey (trumpet)
"IS THAT ALL THERE IS?"	vocals: Mike James
"ANDY"	vocals: Napoleon Murphy Brock

The Great Un-American Songbook Volumes I & II

2017 Cuneiform Records

Disc 1 - Vol. I

Song title	Featured soloist(s)
"Good Morning, Good Morning"	vocals: Bruce McDaniel; solo: Bruce McDaniel (guitar)
"Open Up Said the World at the Door"	solos: John Bailey (trumpet), Ted Kooshian (organ)
"We Love You"	vocals: Bruce McDaniel; solo Katie Jacoby (violin)
"Eleanor Rigby"	solos: Ted Kooshian (organ), Katie Jacoby (violin)
"Definitely Maybe"	solo: Phil Chester (soprano sax)
"As You Said"	solo: Katie Jacoby (violin)
"Larks' Tongues in Aspic, Part II"	solos: Katie Jacoby (violin), Ben Kono (tenor sax)
"21st Century Schizoid Man"	solo: Ed Palermo (alto sax)
"Send Your Son to Die"	vocals: Bruce McDaniel, Ed Palermo, Katie Jacoby; solo: Ed Palermo (guitar)
"Edward, The Mad Shirt Grinder"	solos: Ben Kono (tenor sax), John Bailey (trumpet), Bob Quaranta (piano), Ted Kooshian (organ), Katie Jacoby (violin)

Disc 2 - Vol. II

Song title	Featured soloist(s)
"America/American Idiot"	vocals: Bruce McDaniel, Katie Jacoby (violin)
"Beggar's Farm"	vocals: Bruce McDaniel, Ben Kono (tenor sax), John Bailey (trumpet), Bill Straub (tenor sax)
"Bitches Crystal"	solos: Cliff Lyons (alto sax), Chaley Gordon (trombone), Barbara (baritone sax), Bill Straub (tenor sax)
"The Wreck of the Hesperus"	vocals: Bruce McDaniel
"Diamond Dust"	Bob Quaranta (piano)
"The Low Spark of High Heeled Boys"	vocals: Bruce McDaniel, solos: Cliff Lyons (alto sax), Michael Boschen (trombone)
"Fire"	vocals: Napoleon Murphy Brock
"The Tourist"	vocals: Bruce McDaniel
"Don't Bother Me"	solo: Katie Jacoby (violin)
"Nardis"	solo: John Bailey (trumpet)
"Don't Bother Me (reprise)"	vocals: Bruce McDaniel
"I Wanna Be Your Man"	vocals: Mick Starkey; solo: Katie Jacoby (violin)
"Good Night"	vocals: Mick Starkey

The Adventures of Zodd Zundgren

2018 Cuneiform Records

Song title	Featured soloist(s)
"The Solemn Z-Men Credo"	
"Peaches en Regalia"	Cliff Lyons (alto sax)
"Influenza"	Katie Jacoby (violin)
"Yer Fast"	
"Absolutely Free"	
"Breathless (Part One)"	
"Big Swifty"	
"Kiddie Boy"	Bruce McDaniel (vocals); Ed Palermo (guitar)
"Montana"	Napoleon Murphy Brock (vocals); Ed Palermo (alto sax)
"Emperor of the Highway"	Napoleon Murphy Brock, Bruce McDaniel (vocals)
"You Are What You Is"	Katie Jacoby (violin)
"Echidna's Arf (of You)"	
"Hello It's Me"	Bruce McDaniel (vocals)
"Big Swifty Coda"	
"Wailing Wall"	Bill Straub (tenor sax)
"Florentine Pogen"	Napoleon Murphy Brock (vocals); Ted Kooshian (organ); Charley Gordon (trombone); Ray Marchica (drums)
"Flamingo"	
"Marqueson's Chicken"	Ed Palermo (guitar)
"Song of the Viking"	
"Janet's Big Dance Number"	Ben Kono (tenor sax)
"Broke Down and Busted"	John Bailey (trumpet)
"Breathless (Part Two)"	
"Zoot Allures"	
"Yer Fast (Reprise)"	

A Lousy Day in Harlem

2019 Sky Cat Records

Song title	Featured soloist(s)
"Laurie Frink"	Phil Chester (soprano sax); Bill Straub (tenor sax)
"Affinity"	Cliff Lyons (soprano sax)
"Brasilliance"	Bob Quaranta (piano); John Bailey (trumpet); Bill Straub (clarinet)
"Sanfona"	Phil Chester (soprano sax)
"Like Lee Morgan"	John Bailey (trumpet)
"The One with the Red Balloon"	Charley Gordon (trombone); Nicki Denner (tap dancing)
"Minority"	Ed Palermo (alto sax)
"The Cowboy Song"	Phil Chester (soprano sax)
"Well You Needn't"	Ed Palermo (alto sax); Charley Gordon (trombone); and John Bailey (trumpet)
"Giant Steps"	Bill Straub and Ben Kono (tenor saxes)
"Next Year"	Ed Palermo (alto sax); Gary Oleyar (violin)
"Gargoyles"	Ben Kono (tenor sax); John Bailey (trumpet)
"This Won't Take Long"	Ed Palermo (alto sax)
