= Erland Van Lidth De Jeude =

Dutch–American actor (1953–1987)

Erland van Lidth de Jeude
- Erland van Lidth de Jeude as Dynamo in The Running Man (1987)
- Born: June 3, 1953; Hilversum, Netherlands
- Died: September 23, 1987 (aged 34); Manhattan, New York City, New York, U.S.
- Years active: 1979–1987
- Spouse: Annette Friend (m. 1986–1987)
- Children: 1

Erland Philip Peter van Lidth de Jeude (June 3, 1953 – September 23, 1987) was a Dutch–American actor, opera singer, and amateur wrestler.

== Early life and education ==
Erland Philip Peter van Lidth de Jeude was born in Hilversum, and came to the United States with his family in 1958, where they resided in Orange, New Jersey (until 1960), then Stamford, Connecticut (1960–1962), then Ridgefield, Connecticut (1962–1970) where he attended Ridgefield High School, and moved to Mont Vernon, New Hampshire, in 1970, where he attended Milford Area Senior High School, from which he graduated in 1972. He appeared in theatrical productions and played center and nose guard on the varsity football team. He attended Massachusetts Institute of Technology, where he studied computer science and graduated with a B.S. in Computer Science & Electrical Engineering in 1977. He also distinguished himself on the wrestling team, where he was the 1976 NCAA Division III runner-up in the heavyweight division, and in stage productions, the most successful of which was A Funny Thing Happened on the Way to the Forum, in which he played Miles Gloriosus.

== Career ==
After graduation he worked in Manhattan as a computer professional, while also attending the 1976 Summer Olympics in Montreal as an alternate in the heavyweight division on the wrestling team. His preparation for the 1980 Olympics in Moscow was cut short when the United States boycotted the event. He also won the bronze medal in the international competition held in Tehran in 1978.

The 6 ft 6 in (198 cm), 340-pound (150 kg) wrestler was spotted in the New York Athletic Club by a casting director, which led to his role as the fearsome "Terror", leader of the Fordham Baldies, in the 1979 Philip Kaufman film The Wanderers. He continued to juggle his careers in film and information technology while also singing frequently with the Amato Opera in New York, studying to become a Heldenbaritone, and teaching computer programming at Manhattan Community College. He is perhaps best known for his role as Grossberger in Stir Crazy with Richard Pryor and Gene Wilder, which was released in December 1980. His co-stars in the 1982 slasher film Alone in the Dark included Jack Palance, Martin Landau, Donald Pleasence and Dwight Schultz. Erland was also featured in the 1987 Arnold Schwarzenegger film The Running Man, which was his last film appearance. He played Dynamo, a sadistic stalker who announces his presence by singing the Valkyries' War Cry from Wagner's Die Walküre and electrocutes his victims. He once turned down a role in the John Derek Tarzan film because he did not want to shave his head as he had for The Wanderers and Stir Crazy.

== Personal life ==
Van Lidth De Jeude married Annette Friend on September 22, 1986, with whom he had one son.

He was born into the Dutch noble family van Lidth de Jeude and held the predicate of untitled nobility Jonkheer (comparable to the archaic usage of the British Esquire and cognate to the German Junker).

== Death ==
Van Lidth de Jeude died of heart failure on September 23, 1987, aged 34.

== Wrestling career ==
=== Collegiate wrestling ===
- National Collegiate Athletic Association
  - NCAA Division III Heavyweight - 6th place out of Massachusetts Institute of Technology (1975)
  - NCAA Division III Heavyweight - 2nd place out of Massachusetts Institute of Technology (1976)

== Filmography ==
Year	Title	Role	Notes
1979	The Wanderers	"Terror"	(as Erland Van Lidth De Jeude)
1980	Stir Crazy	Grossberger	(as Erland Van Lidth De Jeude)
1982	Alone in the Dark	Ronald "Fatty" Elster	(as Erland Van Lidth)
1987	The Running Man	"Dynamo"	(as Erland Van Lidth) (final film role)

== See also ==
- List of Dutch noble families
