= Tish Bellomo =

American musician

Patrice "Tish" Bellomo, Co-owner and co-founder of Tish and Snooky’s Manic Panic, attended New York City’s prestigious High School of Music and Art (now the Fiorello H. LaGuardia High School of Music & The Arts).

== Growing Up Punk ==
Tish, along with her sister Snooky Bellomo, was a member of the rock group Blondie. The sisters sang backing vocals at early Blondie gigs at Max's Kansas City and CBGBand went on to form another band called the Drop-Outs. In 1977, their friend Russell Wolinsky invited them to join a band he was forming "for one gig" called the Sic F*cks. They continued to play regularly for the next two years, during which time they even appeared in the 1982 horror film Alone in the Dark. Since then, they have gotten together for sporadic shows throughout the decades.

All the while she continued her education in Fashion Design in NYC, while performing backup singer in the original Blondie band as well as being heard on various albums with her sister Snooky, Tish helped set the tone for both punk music and fashion designing and refurbishing stage wear for Dr. John, The Dead Boys, Kate Pierson from the B-52s, and more.

== Manic Panic ==
In 1977, Sisters Tish and Snooky Bellomo opened the Manic Panic flagship boutique in New York City’s East Village. The headquarters is now located in Long Island City, New York after over 45 years in business.The Bellomo sisters been called "The Martha Stewart of Punk Rock". Manic Panic hair color is now sold and distributed world wide in over 40 countries. Manic Panic hair color has been vegan and cruelty-free since 1977, with only a few exceptions of non-vegan products in their cosmetics line.

== Recognition ==
Manic Panic has been mentioned in many documentaries, crediting them for beginning what would become a trend and now the acceptance of men and women wearing "fashion" hair colors. Manic Panic has received numerous mentions in publications such as Vogue., Teen Vogue, Cosmopolitan, Nylon, Elle, The New York Times, The New Yorker, W, Rolling Stone.

In 2017, the Bellomo sisters with a Lifetime Achievement Award from Beauty Bus, as well as for their contribution to the Punk Rock era, with Museum installations featuring their art and artifacts at the MoMA in the exhibition "Club 57: Film, Performance, and Art in the East Village, 1978–1983" and The Museum of Sex's Punk Lust Exhibition. Both Tish and Snooky were thanked by Blondie lead singer Debbie Harry in her acceptance speech at the Rock and Roll Hall of Fame.
