= Manic Panic (brand) =

Hair color and cosmetics line

Tish & Snooky's Manic Panic N.Y.C.
- Industry: Hair care
- Founded: July 7, 1977; 49 years ago
- Headquarters: New York City, United States
- Area served: Worldwide
- Products: Hair dye and cosmetics
- Owners: Tish and Snooky Bellomo
- Website: manicpanic.com

Manic Panic is the original line of fashion hair colors in the USA. Based in New York City, the company is run by Tish and Snooky Bellomo.

== History ==
Sisters Tish and Snooky Bellomo opened the Manic Panic flagship boutique on July 7, 1977, at 33 St. Marks Place, in New York City’s East Village. Their headquarters are now located in Long Island City, New York after over 45 years in business.

Being native New Yorkers, and deeply involved in the New York punk music scene, they soon found themselves performing at many of the East Village venues. They performed regularly at the infamous CBGB, singing back up with Blondie, and their own punk band, The Sic F*cks. Known and loved for their colorful hair, which was very unconventional at the time, it wasn't long before they introduced their own range of hair dyes and cosmetics right out of the Manic Panic store. When their hair color business boomed, the boutique closed. (The NYC store's front and signage were featured prominently in a shot in the opening montage of Saturday Night Live's 1980–81 season).

Manic Panic is women-owned and independently operated by Tish and Snooky Bellomo, who have been referred to as "The Martha Stewarts of Punk Rock". Manic Panic hair color is sold and distributed worldwide. Their products have been vegan and cruelty-free since 1977, with only a few exceptions of non-vegan products in their cosmetics line.

Manic Panic has been mentioned in many documentaries, crediting them for beginning what would become a trend and now the acceptance of men and women wearing "fashion" hair colors. Manic Panic has received numerous mentions in publications such as Vogue, Teen Vogue, Cosmopolitan, Nylon, The New Yorker, W, and Rolling Stone.

Tish and Snooky continue to perform as musicians. They have recorded and performed live many times with Blue Coupe (a supergroup composed of original members of Blue Öyster Cult, along with Rock and Roll Hall of Fame inductee and the original Alice Cooper bassist, Dennis Dunaway). They also continue to perform with the Sic F*cks, reuniting for special occasions like tributes to CBGB, Joey Ramone benefits, and various animal charity events.

== Products ==
A jar of Manic Panic hair dye

Apart from hair dye, Manic Panic sells many other products geared towards punk, gothic, and fashion-forward consumers.
