= Alone in the Dark (1982 film) =

1982 American slasher film by Jack Sholder

- Theatrical release poster
- Directed by: Jack Sholder
- Screenplay by: Jack Sholder
- Story by: Jack Sholder; Robert Shaye; Michael Harrpster
- Produced by: Robert Shaye; Benni Korzen
- Starring: Jack Palance; Donald Pleasence; Martin Landau; Dwight Schultz; Erland Van Lidth
- Cinematography: Joseph Mangine
- Edited by: Arline Garson
- Music by: Renato Serio
- Production companies: New Line Cinema; Masada Productions
- Distributed by: New Line Cinema
- Release date: October 1, 1982 (Michigan)
- Running time: 92 minutes
- Country: United States
- Language: English
- Budget: $1 million
- Box office: $1.4 million

Alone in the Dark is a 1982 American slasher film co-written and directed by Jack Sholder in his directorial debut, and starring Jack Palance, Martin Landau, Donald Pleasence, Dwight Schultz, and Erland Van Lidth. The plot follows a psychiatrist's family who are besieged by four escaped mental patients during a power blackout.

Following Stunts and Polyester, Alone in the Dark was one of the earliest films produced by distributor New Line Cinema. The film was shot on location in Bergen County, New Jersey and Palisades, New York in the fall of 1981. New Line Cinema released the film in Michigan on October 1, 1982, with its release expanding to California and New York on November 19, 1982. It grossed $1.4 million at the United States box office and received mixed reviews at the time of its release, though it went on to develop a cult following in subsequent years.

== Plot ==
Psychiatrist Dan Potter is appointed on the staff of Dr. Leo Bain's experimental psychiatric hospital, known as the Haven, in New Jersey. His predecessor, Dr. Henry Merton, has taken a new position in Philadelphia. Dan, his wife Nell, and their daughter Lyla, move into a rural home in the area. At Haven, Dr. Bain uses lenient security methods, except with the third-floor patients, whom he keeps contained with an electric security door. Among them are former POW Frank Hawkes, pyromaniac evangelist Byron "Preacher" Sutcliff, obese child molester Ronald Elster, and a shy serial killer John "the Bleeder" Skaggs, who refuses to show his face. Angered by Dr. Merton's departure, the third-floor patients irrationally blame Dan, believing he has murdered Merton and taken his place. The four men make plans to kill Dan, and retrieve his address from Dr. Bain's office.

Dan's younger sister, Toni Potter, who has recently suffered a nervous breakdown, arrives to visit. Dan, Nell, and Toni go to a local rock club, while Lyla is left with babysitter Bunky. A regional power outage occurs. The security system at Haven fails, and the four men on the third floor escape, killing security guard Ray Curtis in the process, before killing employee Dr. Barkin and stealing his car. They stop by a local strip mall that is being looted during the blackout and arm themselves with weapons from a sporting goods store. They leave Skaggs behind after he kills an innocent bystander.

The next morning, Preacher arrives at the Potter residence, pretending to be delivering a telegram, but Dan is not home. While Lyla is at school, Nell accompanies Toni to a nuclear power protest, where the women are arrested. Lyla arrives home from school and finds Ronald in the house, claiming to be a babysitter. After Nell phones Dan from jail explaining what has happened, Dan calls Bunky, who goes to check on Lyla. She finds Lyla asleep in her room, and invites her boyfriend Billy there to have sex. Preacher kills Billy by dragging him beneath the bed and stabbing him, while Ronald strangles Bunky. Lyla later awakens unharmed, but Ronald has vanished. Dan arrives home with Nell, Toni, and Tom Smith, a fellow protester Nell and Toni met in jail, whom Toni is attracted to. They find police at the house, and Detective John Barnett interviewing Lyla about the missing Bunky and Billy. Lyla explains that a man named Ronald babysat her; Dan recognizes him as one of the Haven patients.

Dan and Nell invite Detective Barnett to stay for dinner. While investigating a noise outside, Barnett is killed with a crossbow by Frank, which is witnessed by the entire family. Finding the phone lines cut, the family barricade themselves in the house. Meanwhile, Dr. Bain arrives after unsuccessfully attempting to reach Dan by phone, but is hacked to death by Preacher with an axe. Dan attempts to reason with the men, assuring them he has not killed Dr. Merton. Ronald throws Barnett's body through a window, and Preacher manages to infiltrate the basement, where he starts a fire. Dan bludgeons Preacher with an extinguisher canister before putting out the fire, locking the basement door behind him.

Ronald enters the kitchen and attempts to kill the family, but they work together to disarm him, before Tom kills him with a cleaver. Dan flees outside to retrieve Dr. Bain's car. While he does, Tom's nose begins bleeding profusely, revealing his identity as Skaggs, the fourth patient. Hearing the screams, Dan flees back into the house. Skaggs attempts to kill Toni, but Nell stabs him to death. Moments later, Preacher bursts out of the basement, but Dan stabs him to death. Frank appears with his crossbow, proclaiming, "It's not just us crazy ones who kill." Dan pleads with Frank to spare his family. Suddenly, the electricity is restored, and Frank witnesses Dr. Merton being interviewed on a local news station about the missing patients. Hysterical, Frank smashes the television and flees into the night.

A short time later, Frank arrives at the local rock club. A drunken woman approaches him inside. He pulls out a pistol, pointing it to her neck. Assuming he is playing a joke, the woman laughs, and so does Frank.

== Cast ==
- Jack Palance as Frank Hawkes
- Donald Pleasence as Dr. Leo Bain
- Martin Landau as Byron "Preacher" Sutcliff
- Dwight Schultz as Dr. Dan Potter
- Erland Van Lidth as Ronald "Fatty" Elster
- Deborah Hedwall as Nell Potter
- Lee Taylor-Allan as Toni Potter
- Phillip Clark as Tom Smith / John "Bleeder" Skaggs
- Elizabeth Ward as Lyla Potter
- Brent Jennings as Ray Curtis
- Gordon Watkins as Detective John Barnett
- Carol Levy as "Bunky"
- Keith Reddin as Billy
- Annie Korzen as Marissa Hall
- Lin Shaye as Melody
- Jana Schneider as Spaced-Out Girl
- Larry Pine as Dr. Henry Merton
- Frederick Coffin as Jim Gable
- Steve Daskewisz as Dr. Barkin
- The Sic F*cks as Themselves

== Production ==
=== Development ===
Alone in the Dark was the first film produced by New Line Cinema, which had previously been exclusively a film distribution company. According to director Jack Sholder, he had listened to New Line founder Robert Shaye mull over the idea of getting into production of low-budget horror films, and pitched the idea of "a group of criminally insane guys escaping from a mental hospital during a blackout in NYC and creating mayhem and then getting rounded up by the mafia", citing a New York City blackout he had experienced several years prior as an inspiration. The script was considered too expensive to produce, so it was re-written as a home-invasion thriller (without the "mafia" angle). While New Line raised money for the film, Sholder worked as the editor of the 1981 slasher The Burning, which he credits with helping him learn about "building scares and how to build suspense and tension".

Sholder has said that the character of Dr. Leo Bain is based on Scottish psychiatrist R. D. Laing, who espoused a similar philosophy regarding the treatment of mentally ill patients.

=== Casting ===
The casting of esteemed actors Donald Pleasence, Jack Palance, and Martin Landau resulted in the film's original budget of $800,000 being increased to $1 million.

=== Filming ===
Principal photography of Alone in the Dark took place in New York and Bergen County, New Jersey over a period of 35 days in the fall of 1981. The home featured in the film was an actual psychiatrist's residence in Palisades, New York.

== Release ==
Alone in the Dark was released regionally in Michigan the weekend of October 1, 1982. It was also shown in St. Louis, Missouri beginning November 5, 1982. Its release expanded to California and New York on November 19, 1982.

The film was later screened at the 16th Annual Sitges Film Festival in October 1983, where Elizabeth Ward received an award for Best Actress for her work in the film.

=== Home media ===
Alone in the Dark was released on RCA CED Videodisc in 1982 and on DVD by Image Entertainment under license from New Line Cinema on September 13, 2005. Image would later re-release the film on June 5, 2007, as a part of a two-disk four movie pack.

It was released for the first time on Blu-ray by Scream Factory under license from Warner Bros. Home Entertainment and Studio Distribution Services on September 14, 2021.

== Reception ==
=== Box office ===
Alone in the Dark grossed $1.4 million at the box office in the United States and Canada.

=== Critical response ===
On the review aggregator website Rotten Tomatoes, Alone in the Dark holds a 62% approval rating based on 13 critic reviews.

Bill O'Connor of the Akron Beacon Journal praised the performances in the film and its suspense, noting, "the terror builds more by anticipation and it also builds by its undercurrent of madness." Bill Kaufman of Newsday gave the film a middling review, noting that it "never rises above the route. There are moments of suspense here and there, but mainly everything is predictable."

Brett Gallman from Oh, the Horror gave the film a positive review, commending the film for its tense atmosphere, dark humor, and Donald Pleasence's performance. Felix Vasquez from Cinema Crazed offered similar praise, commending its unique style, gradual building of tension, performances, and twist ending. Vasquez concluded his review by writing, "Sholder succeeds in building the sense of isolation and dread in the climax, and sure, the plot twist with our characters is completely telegraphed minutes in advance, but it's still a fantastic revelation nonetheless". Dennis Schwartz from Ozus' World Movie Reviews rated the film a grade B: "Though the plot is hokey and its message is crazy, the maniacs-on-the-loose thriller is chilling".

== See also ==
- Blackout - 2008 American horror film featuring a similar premise.
- List of films featuring home invasions

== Sources ==
- Donahue, Suzanne Mary (1987). American Film Distribution: The Changing Marketplace. Ann Arbor, Michigan: UMI Research Press. ISBN 978-0-835-71776-2.
- Edwards, Matthew (2017). Twisted Visions: Interviews with Cult Horror Filmmakers. Jefferson, North Carolina: McFarland & Company. ISBN 978-1-476-66376-0.
- Rockoff, Adam (2011). Going to Pieces: The Rise and Fall of the Slasher Film, 1978-1986. Jefferson, North Carolina: McFarland & Company. ISBN 9780786469321.
