= Benjamin Genocchio =

Australian art critic (born 1969)

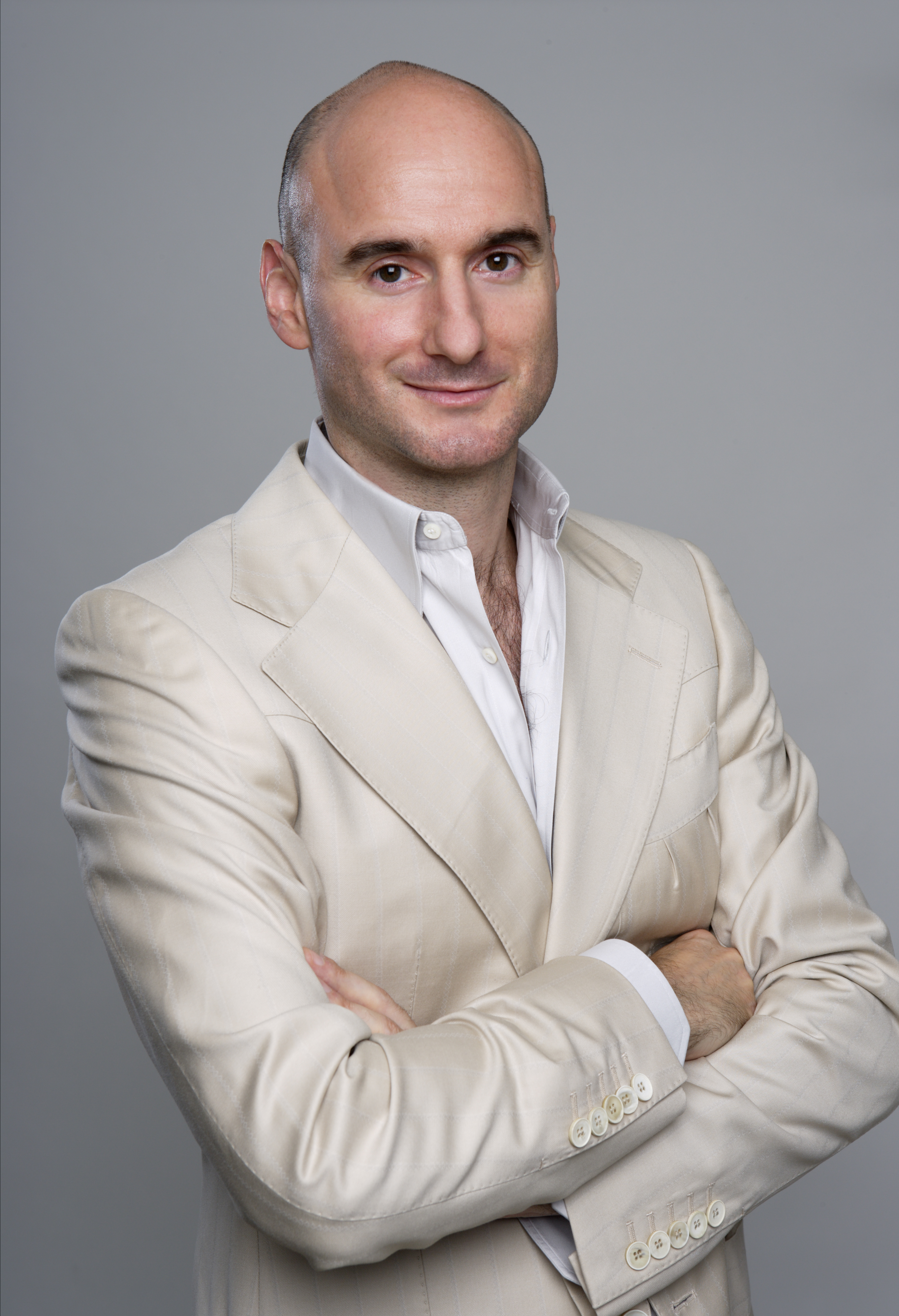
- Born: 1969 (age 56–57); Sydney, Australia
- Education: Newington College; University of Sydney
- Occupation: Art critic
- Spouse: Melissa Chiu
- Website: www.benjamingenocchio.net

Benjamin Genocchio (born 1969) is an Australian art critic, editor, and non-fiction writer based in New York, United States. He is editor-in-chief of Incollect Magazine.

He worked as an art critic for The New York Times, and then as editor-in-chief of Art+Auction magazine, Modern Painters magazine and the website "artinfo.com". He was director of the Armory Show until November 2017, when he was let go following allegations of sexual harassment, which he denied. He was previously editor-in-chief of Artnet News, where he also faced accusations of sexual harassment.

From October to December 2021, he was director-at-large for Shoshana Wayne Gallery in Los Angeles and New York City, until he became editor-in-chief at Incollect.

== Family and education ==
Genocchio was born in Sydney in 1969. He is the second of four sons of an Italian father, Giorgio, who worked on a cruise ship, and an Australian mother, Jennifer. Genocchio grew up in Lane Cove and attended Newington College from 1981 to 1986. As a youth he had a short attention span and a low boredom threshold, traits he says led him to become an art critic. Genocchio completed a PhD in history of art at the University of Sydney in 1996. He is a citizen of Australia and Italy.

== Career ==
=== Early career ===
Genocchio began his career in journalism in Australia, writing for Business Review Weekly. He was an art critic for The Bulletin, a weekly current affairs magazine, and The Sydney Morning Herald newspaper.

In 1997, Genocchio became the Sydney art critic for The Australian, Australia's daily newspaper. He also worked as the paper's chief art critic and, later, national arts correspondent, covering art and culture in Australia and abroad.

In 2001, Genocchio wrote Solitaire, the first monograph dedicated to contemporary Indigenous Australian artist Fiona Foley, whose work reflects her Badtjala cultural heritage.

=== The New York Times ===
In late December 2002, Genocchio moved to New York to begin writing for The New York Times. He worked as an art critic for The New York Times for 9 years. He was an art lecturer at Sydney University and a member of the offshore faculty of Boston University. In 2008, he published Dollar Dreaming, an exposé of corruption and double-dealing in the $500-million trade in Aboriginal art in Australia and abroad. In 2009, he was a guest lecturer at Fowler Museum at UCLA, where he spoke on Aboriginal art.

=== Blouin Media ===
In early 2010, he became editorial director at Louise Blouin Media, and editor-in-chief of Art+Auction magazine, Modern Painters and artinfo.com. He left the post at Modern Painters in 2011.

=== Artnet News ===
Genocchio left Blouin Media in January 2014 and joined Artnet, where he was the first editor-in-chief of Artnet News, a 24-hour art news website. In December 2015 he was appointed director of the Armory Show. The Armory Show opened on March 3, 2016, under Genocchio's direction, featuring 205 dealers from 35 countries and showcasing the work of over 2,000 modern and contemporary artists. He was ousted in November 2017 after multiple accusations of sexual harassment were made against him that extended to his time at Louise Blouin Media, Artnet and the Armory. He denied the accusation in a statement saying that while he had conflicts with employees, he never acted inappropriately, and apologized for any behavior perceived as disrespectful. He was hired shortly afterwards as U.S. vice president of Galerie Gmurzynska, which has spaces in Zurich and New York.

From October to December 2021, Genocchio was director-at-large for the Shoshana Wayne Gallery in Los Angeles and New York City.

=== Incollect Magazine ===
In May 2022, Genocchio was appointed Editor-in-chief of Incollect Magazine. He is working on the rebranding of Antiques & Fine Art Magazine as Incollect Magazine, a quarterly print publication.

Genocchio is a strategic advisor to the Scottsdale Ferrari Art Week and Art Fair. Scottsdale Ferrari Art Week is an art and design fair for both local and international galleries, dealers, and collectors.

== Personal life ==
Genocchio lives in New York state. He is married to curator Melissa Chiu, with whom he wrote Asian Art Now (2010). In September 2015, The Washington Post reported that Genocchio had edited the content of Chiu's Wikipedia article to remove negative commentary about her work at the Hirshhorn and to add laudatory statements.

== Publications ==
- Dollar Dreaming: The Rise of the Aboriginal Art Market
- Fiona Foley: Solitaire
- The Art of Persuasion, Australian Art Criticism
- Simeon Nelson, Passages
- (ed.) What is Installation?
- Contemporary Asian Art
- Asian Contemporary Art
- (ed.) Contemporary Asian Art, A Critical Reader
- Art Studio America: Contemporary Artist Spaces
- Modern Art in Africa, Asia and Latin America: An Introduction to Global Modernisms
- What Is Installation?: An Anthology of Writings on Australian Installation Art
- Asian Art Now
