= Culture+Travel =

American travel magazine

- The award-winning May /June 2008 edition cover, by Emily Crawford.
- Editor-in-Chief: Robert Michael Poole
- Former editors: Kate Sekules, Michael Boodro
- Categories: Travel, Lifestyle, Art
- Frequency: Bi-monthly
- Publisher: Louise Blouin Media
- Founder: James Truman
- First issue: October 1, 2006
- Final issue: 2014
- Country: United States
- Based in: New York City, New York
- Language: English
- Website: www.cultureandtravel.com
- ISSN: 1939-4853

Culture+Travel (formerly Culture & Travel) is a travel magazine based in New York City, New York. Published by Louise Blouin Media and founded by former Conde Nast editorial director James Truman, it was launched in 2006 as a bi-monthly print magazine. It was later incorporated into art and lifestyle media Artinfo.com, and relaunched as an online publication in 2014, providing original articles and travel destination guides.

Print editions of its stories appear in both Art+Auction and Modern Painters magazines. Its main competitors are Condé Nast Traveler and Travel + Leisure. The editor-in-chief since 2014 is Robert Michael Poole.

== History ==
Culture+Travel was launched in 2006, a joint project between James Truman, former head of Conde Nast, and Louise Blouin, a Canadian businesswoman who had created a publishing house of multiple art magazines and books. Truman, originally from Nottingham, England, had wanted to launch an art magazine at Conde Nast, but failed to gain the support of the chief Samuel Irving "Si" Newhouse. Truman subsequently left Conde Nast in January 2005 after 11 years at the publishing house. After meeting Blouin in London, Truman was officially appointed chief executive officer and managing editor of Blouin's investment holding company LTB Holding in October 2005. He aimed at first to launch a new art and travel magazine in the UK, but relocated to Manhattan where the new title, Culture & Travel, launched in October 2006.

Truman's editorial vision was to create a "very, very particular take on travel, for people who travel because they're interested in art, history and culture." The concept was for artists to write articles and for curators to select destinations, rather than hire travel journalists and food critics. The publication began with six full-time staff, with most content provided by well-known freelancers, authors and artists, including award-winning author and screenwriter Peter Feibleman, writer and literary critic William Zinsser, critically acclaimed Irish author Jamie O'Neill, and American architecture critic Herbert Muschamp.

Within the Louise Blouin Media group, the magazine had a higher-priced page to encourage advertisers who were interested in the arts, but were outside the art world, to come on board. Truman stated that "We don't go in and say we want to make money. You say you try to do it right", the high-end travel magazine had an initial controlled circulation of 60,000 with no newsstand sales, as copies of it were delivered directly to a small, dedicated readership.

A magazine launch party was held on September 26, 2006, attended by journalists from the New York Post, The Times, Adweek, The New York Observer and Elle at one of architect Richard Meier's West Street towers, inside the house of Louise Blouin. Former Travel + Leisure creative director Emily Crawford art-directed the first edition of the magazine, which was described as "handsomely designed". Following the launch of Culture & Travel's first edition, Truman stepped down after one year as CEO in October 2006.

=== 2006–2008 ===
Michael Boodro was installed as Editor-in-Chief from the launch edition. A former Executive Editor at Elle Decor, he would return there as editor-in-chief in 2010. Kate Sekules, former Travel Editor of Food & Wine, writer for The New York Times and Vogue and author of The Boxer's Heart: A Woman Fighting then took over, overseeing the name change from Culture & Travel to Culture+Travel, and a redesign in October 2007 that saw the magazine awarded a Merit for Magazine of the Year in 2009 from The Society of Publication Designers, as well as a Gold Medal for creative director Emily Crawford and illustrator Balint Zsako for the May/June 2008 cover, titled "Europe".

During 2007–8, the magazine built a cult following, its lush photography and unusual destination pieces earning a reputation as "the magazine for people who love the arts and travel with a passion." Notable contributors included photographer and artist Jill Greenberg, American literary critic Daphne Merkin, Canadian journalist Graeme Wood, Dutch novelist Arnon Grunberg, illustrator Maira Kalman, Canadian musician Jamie James, Irish writer and novelist Colum McCann, and renowned American photographers Nan Goldin and Kathryn Parker Almanas.

Journalist Joshuah Bearman, the original creator of the Academy Award and Golden Globe-winning screenplay and movie Argo, wrote the cover feature in March 2008 on Japanese culture. Other contributors in the same edition included British author and journalist Vivien Goldman, and American author and co-editor of The Believer magazine, Heidi Julavits. In 2008, the publication moved online as part of Artinfo.

== See also ==
- Louise Blouin Media
