= Trader =

Trader may refer to:

- Merchant, retailer or one who attempts to generally buy wholesale and sell later at a profit
- The owner of a trading post, where manufactured goods were exchanged with native peoples for furs and hides.
- Trader (finance), someone who buys and sells financial instruments such as stocks, bonds, derivatives, etc.
- Trader Classified Media, classified advertisement company
- Trader Media East, largest classified advertising company in Central and Eastern Europe
- Trader (comics), the name of two separate fictional characters in the Marvel Comics universe
- "The Trader", a song by The Beach Boys from their album Holland
- A merchant vessel, a boat or ship that transports cargo or carries passengers for hire. This excludes pleasure craft that do not carry passengers for hire and warships
- Grumman C-1 Trader, a piston, carrier born cargo plane.

== Traders ==
- One of the brands under Shangri-La Hotels
- Traders (video game), a DOS video game published in 1991
- Traders (TV series) (1996–2000), Canadian drama on Global Television Network

== See also ==
- Trade (disambiguation)
- Joshisa Trader (born 2005), American football player
- Trader Horn (1861–1931), ivory trader in central Africa; the subject of more than one film
- Trader Monthly, magazine for financial traders
