= Alex Farquharson =

British curator and art critic

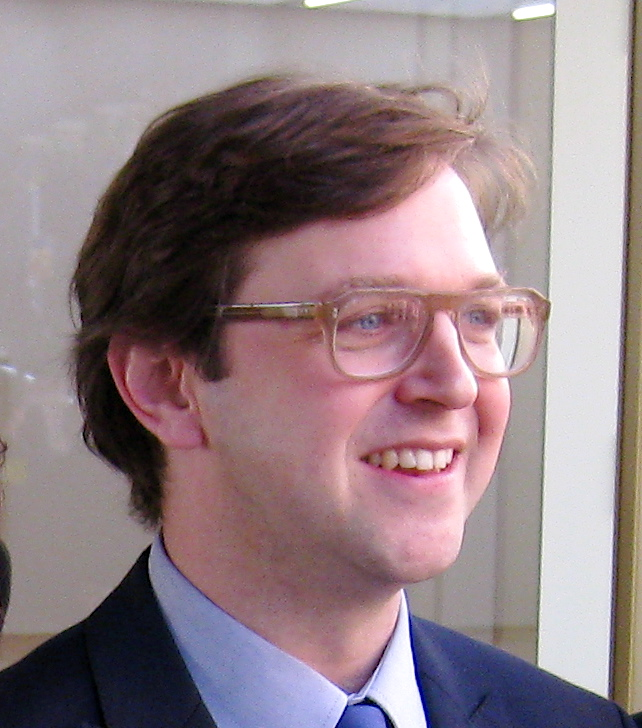
Alex Farquharson in 2009

Alex Farquharson (b. 1969), OBE, is a British curator and art critic who is serving of Director of Tate Britain since 2015. As Director of Tate Britain, he is by extension the Chair of the Turner Prize. In 2023, Farquharson oversaw the complete rehang of Tate's world-leading collection of British art.

Farquharson curated, with David A Bailey, "Life Between Islands: Caribbean-British Art, 1950s-Now" (2021-22) at Tate Britain, which travelled to Art Gallery of Ontario, Toronto, Canada (2023-24).

Previously, he was founding Director of Nottingham Contemporary from 2007 to 2015. Designed by Caruso St John, it launched with exhibitions devoted to David Hockney's early London and Los Angeles years and Frances Stark.

Group exhibitions Farquharson curated at Nottingham Contemporary include "Aquatopia: The Imaginary of the Ocean Deep" (which travelled to Tate St Ives), "Glenn Ligon: Encounters and Collisions" (with Ligon and Francesco Manacorda), "Star City: the Future under Communism" (with Lukas Ronduda), "Kafou: Haiti, Art and Vodou" (with Leah Gordon) and "The Impossible Prison".

Solo exhibitions Farquharson programmed at Nottingham Contemporary include Huang Yong Ping, Wael Shawky, Mika Rottenberg, Thomas Demand, Francis Upritchard, Alfred Kubin, James Gillray, Anne Collier, Jack Goldstein, Danh Vo, Carol Rama, Pablo Bronstein, Mark Leckey, Geoffrey Farmer, ASCO, Tala Madani, Piero Gilardi, John Newling, Diane Arbus, Gert & Uwe Tobias, Marc Camille Chaimowicz, Monster Chetwynd, Marguerite Humeau, Klaus Weber, Otobong Nkanga, Michael Beutler, and Simon Starling.

Farquharson was an independent curator from 2000 to 2007. Exhibitions he curated at that time include the British Art Show 6 (with Andrea Schlieker), which opened at BALTIC, Gateshead, in 2005; "If Everybody had an Ocean", an exhibition inspired by the musician Brian Wilson, at Tate St Ives in 2007 and CAPC Bordeaux in 2006; "Le Voyage Interieur" (with Alexis Vaillant), at Espace Electra, Paris, which explored symbolism and decadence in contemporary French and British art within an immersive exhibition design evoking Joris-Karl Huysmans novel 'A Rebours'.

From 2001-2008, Farquharson taught curating on the MA in Curating Contemporary Art course at the Royal College of Art, where he was also a research fellow. During this time, he wrote extensively on contemporary art and innovations in curating, frequently contributing to frieze, Artforum and Art Monthly. Farquharson contributed essays to books and exhibition catalogues on artists including Richard Wright for Dundee Contemporary Arts, Thomas Demand for Fondazione Prada, Navin Rawainchaikul for The British Council, Haluk Akakce for Creative Time, Annie Ratti for Charta, and Gavin Turk for South London Gallery. He also co-authored a survey of Isa Genzken's work for Phaidon's Contemporary Artist Series.

He was Curator and Exhibitions Director at Spacex (art gallery), Exeter, from 1994 to 1999, and was Exhibitions Director at the short-lived Centre for Visual Arts, Cardiff, from 1999 to 2000. Exhibitions he curated include Richard Long, Lari Pittman, Bridget Riley, Gary Hume, Gillian Wearing, Daphne Wright and Keith Coventry. At Centre for Visual Arts, exhibitions Farquharson curated or programmed included show solo exhibitions by Jessica Stockholder, David Nash and Jeremy Deller.

He is a trustee of Raven Row, and is on the Government Art Collection advisory committee. He has served on the acquisitions committee for the Arts Council Collection and on the juries of the Deutsche Börse Photography Prize at The Photographers Gallery in 2011, London and the British Pavilion at the Venice Biennale in 2009.

Farquharson holds honorary doctorates from The University of Nottingham, Exeter University and Nottingham Trent University. He holds a Combined Honours BA in English and Fine Art from Exeter University (1991), and has an MA with Distinction in Arts Criticism from City University, 1993.
