= Trader Corporation =

Canadian technology company

Coordinates: 43.645628°N 79.566323°W

TRADER Corporation
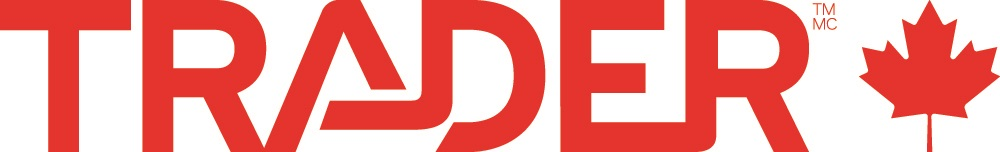
- Type: Private
- Industry: Classified advertising, automotive
- Predecessor: Trader Classified Media (Classified Media Holdings Inc., Trader Media Corp.)
- Founded: June 2006; 20 years ago
- Founder: John MacBain
- Headquarters: Toronto, Canada
- Area served: Canada
- Key people: Sebastian Baldwin (CEO)
- Products: AutoTrader.ca, AutoHebdo.net, Autos.ca, dealer products
- Owner: Thoma Bravo
- Website: go.trader.ca

Trader Corporation is a Canadian German technology company based in Toronto specializing in classified automotive advertising. The company's flagship product is AutoTrader, an online marketplace for buying and selling new and used vehicles. The company is owned by a German company, AutoScout24 GmbH. The company was originally a part of Trader Classified Media, which was founded in 1987 by John MacBain. Trader Corporation’s current CEO and President is Sebastian Baldwin.

== History ==
AutoTrader (Trader Corporation) was founded in 1975 in Etobicoke, Ontario. The company was known for its AutoTrader magazine, which was published under different names depending on the geographic region. In 1987, AutoTrader was acquired by John MacBain, founder, president, and CEO of Trader Classified Media. Trader Classified Media included over 500 print titles and 57 internet sites in 20 countries. Trader Classified Media went public in 2000 and was publicly traded on NASDAQ and the Euronext Paris Stock Exchange.

Trader Corporation was formed in June 2006 with the integration of Classified Media (Canada) Holdings Inc. (more commonly known as Trader Canada) and Trader Media Corporation. The two companies were acquired by Yellow Pages Income Fund from Trader Classified Media that same year. Yellow Pages purchased Classified Media (Canada) Holdings Inc. for $760 million and Trader Media Corporation for $436 million.

In July 2010, Trader Corporation acquired CanadianDriver.com, which offered Canada-focused automotive reviews and resources. The site was rebranded as Autos.ca.

Yellow Pages sold its Trader Corporation division in March 2011 to London-based private equity firm Apax Partners for $745 million. Apax Partners previously purchased a 49.9% stake in U.K.-based Trader Media Group in 2007, and acquired the remaining 50.1% in 2014.

In June 2012, Trader Corporation stopped publishing the AutoTrader magazine and several of its other magazines and pushed a move towards online car advertising.

In 2016, Apax sold Trader Corporation to Thoma Bravo for C$1.57 billion (US$1.22 billion). In the same year, editorial content was moved to the AutoTrader.ca domain; Autos.ca has been put into maintenance mode.

Since 2017, the company has awarded the best cars in each segment in Canada.

In March 2018, Convertus announced a partnership with Trader Corporation. In May 2018, Trader Corporation announced a strategic investment in DealerBreacher, a digital advertising services company based in Montreal.

The company announced its first Editor-in-Chief, Jodi Lai, in November 2019. In June 2019, Trader Corporation acquired Quebec digital marketplace LesPac.

In January 2020, Trader Corporation invested in Motoinsight, a provider of digital retailing solutions for the automotive industry. In May 2020, AutoTrader.ca added online transaction capabilities and allowed Canadian users to purchase cars on the website.

In June 2021, Trader Corporation invested in Activix, a software development firm that serves automobile dealerships.

In February 2022, AutoTrader announced the start of a partnership with digital communications company that specializes in automotive, RAPID RTC.

== Activities ==
AutoTrader.ca AutoHebdo.net
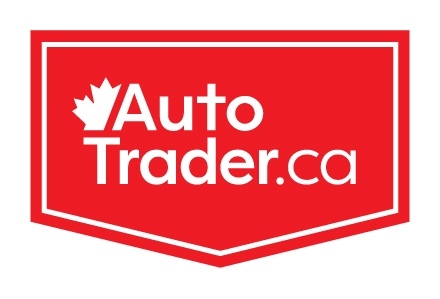
- Website type: Online
- Available in: English, French
- Area served: Canada
- Owner: TRADER Corporation
- Website: www.autotrader.ca www.autohebdo.net
- Commercial: Yes

AutoTrader.ca (French: AutoHebdo.net) is a Canadian online automotive marketplace operated by Trader Corporation. The online marketplace is the main consumer product of Trader Corporation. The site hosts classified listings for new and used passenger vehicles, as well as motorcycles, trailers, commercial vehicles, heavy equipment, personal watercraft, and other motorized vehicles. The site also offers news, vehicle reviews, expert tips and advice, and a vehicle information database.

The Autos.ca YouTube channel was launched in 2012, and was later renamed AutoTrader Canada along with the content migration. The channel hosts weekly vehicle reviews, as well as podcast episodes in video format. Launched in 2022, the biweekly podcast Own the Road with AutoTrader is hosted by editor-in-chief Jodi Lai and road test editor Dan Ilika. The pair discuss various automotive topics in an informal style.

In 2017, AutoTrader started an annual awards program highlighting the best vehicles in each segment in Canada. The website has an app with the same name available on Google Play and the AppStore.
