= Trade (disambiguation) =

Trade is the voluntary exchange of goods, services, or both.

Trade or trading may also refer to:

== Geography ==
- Trade, Tennessee, an unincorporated community, United States
- Trade City, Pennsylvania, an unincorporated community, United States
- Trades, Rhône, a commune, France

== Arts, entertainment, and media ==
- Trade (film), a 2007 film produced by Roland Emmerich and Rosilyn Heller
- Trade, a trading card game
- Trade, in collective card games, is an in-game exchange of cards that doesn't produce card advantage
- Trade paperback (comics), a collection of stories originally published in comic books
- Trade magazine (also called a trade journal, or trade paper, trade publication, or trade rag), is a magazine or newspaper whose target audience is people who work in a particular trade or industry; the collective term for this area of publishing is the trade press

== Occupations and industries ==
- Trade, or craft, traditional blue and grey collar occupations requiring manual skills and specialized knowledge
- Trade fair (also called an expo or a trade exhibition, or trade show), an exhibition organized so that companies in a specific industry can showcase and demonstrate their latest products and services, meet with industry partners and customers, study activities of rivals, and examine recent market trends and opportunities
- Trade guild, an association of artisans or merchants who oversee the practice of their craft/trade in a particular area

== Other uses ==
- Trade (finance), an exchange involving a financial asset
- Trade (sports), a sports league transaction between sports teams involving the exchange of player rights
- Stock in trade, inventory
- Trade (gay slang), the casual partner of a gay man
- Trade (nightclub), a gay nightclub in London

== See also ==
- Collecting, the activity of exchanging collectible items such as stamps or game cards
- Exchange (disambiguation)
- Skin Trade (disambiguation)
- Trader (disambiguation)
