= Jane Marcus =

British feminist scholar (1938–2015)

Jane Marcus (1938–2015) was a pioneering feminist literary scholar, specializing in women writers of the Modernist era, but especially in the social and political context of their writings. Focusing on Virginia Woolf, Rebecca West, and Nancy Cunard, among many others, she devised groundbreaking analyses of Woolf's writings, upending a generation of criticism that ignored feminist, pacifist, and socialist themes in much of Woolf's work and critique of imperialism and bourgeois society. Marcus's understanding of Woolf's place within the larger context of English literature has become prevailing wisdom today in the fields affected by her theorization and research, despite the controversial nature of her positions when they were originally formulated and how much opposition she garnered from earlier scholars and critics.

Illuminating aspects of their work that had been overlooked or undervalued, Marcus was also an expert and groundbreaking scholar in relation to other key figures of the 20th century, such as Dame Rebecca West, the British composer Ethel Smyth, and Nancy Cunard. During the course of her research on West, Marcus and West became friends in the last years of West's life, and the two shared a passion for women's writings and women's perspectives, as well as for controversy, outspokenness, and original thinking from a feminist perspective. The Jane Marcus Collection is newly housed at Mount Holyoke College, South Hadley, Massachusetts, and includes manuscripts of her books, talks, correspondence and research files. Her correspondence with Rebecca West as well as the poet Adrienne Rich are of particular interest to scholars working in the fields of feminist theory, gender studies, modernism, and women's history, among others.

== Education ==
Jane Marcus did her undergraduate A.B. cum laude in English, 1960, at Radcliffe College, her M.A. at Brandeis University, 1965, and her Ph.D. at Northwestern University, 1973.

== Appointments (selected list) ==
Marcus was a Distinguished Professor of English at the City College of New York and the Graduate Center, CUNY, whose faculty she joined in 1986. Marcus also taught at the University of Texas, Austin and helped found women's studies programs at the University of Illinois at Chicago and the University of Texas. She was a Guggenheim Foundation Fellow in 1993. She was an IRADAC Fellow (Rockefeller) CCNY 2002-2003; March–April 1997, Rockefeller Bellagio Residency, Fall 1996; Camargo Foundation Fellowship, Cassis, France, 1995-6; Andrew W. Mellon Foundation Fellowship, Harry Ransome Humanities Research Center, University of Texas (June 1996); 1994-5 Visiting Fellow Rutgers Center for Historical Analysis; Visiting fellow, Clare Hall Cambridge University, 1993-4, Scholar Incentive Award, The City College of New York, 1993 (Spring); Eisner Fellow, CCNY (Strasbourg, France, 1991-3; Coordinator of Women's Studies Certificate Program, CUNY, 1991-1994; 1990 Iris Howard Regents Professor of English and Comparative Literature, University of Texas.

== Personal life ==
Marcus was of Irish Catholic descent. Born in Vermont, she grew up in the Boston area. She was the mother of Lisa Marcus, Professor of English, Pacific Lutheran University; Jason Marcus; and the novelist Ben Marcus and is portrayed in his book Notable American Women; through him, her daughter-in-law is writer Heidi Julavits. Her husband, Michael Marcus, is a Professor Emeritus at The Graduate Center of the City University of New York in the Department of Mathematics.

== Works ==
=== Books ===
- (ed.) Selected Writings of Caroline Norton, with intro by James Hoge. New York: Scholars' Facsimile Press, 1978.
- New Feminist Essays on Virginia Woolf. London: Macmillan; Lincoln: University of Nebraska Press, 1981; ppbk 1984.
- The Young Rebecca West: 1911-1917. London: Macmillan/Virago, New York: Viking Press, 1982); ppbk: Virago 1983; Indiana University Press, 1989)
- (ed.) Virginia Woolf: A Feminist Slant. Lincoln: University of Nebraska Press, 1983.
- (ed.) Virginia Woolf and Bloomsbury: A Centenary Celebration. London: Macmillan, Bloomington, Indiana: Indiana University Press, 1987.
- Virginia Woolf and the Languages of Patriarchy. Bloomington: Indiana University Press, 1987.
- (ed.) Suffrage and the Pankhursts. London: Routledge, 1987
- Art and Anger: Reading Like a Woman. Columbus: Ohio State University Press, 1988.
- Virginia Woolf and Cambridge: The Proper Upkeep of Names. London: Cecil Woolf Publishers, Bloomsbury Heritage Series #11, 1996.
- Hearts of Darkness: White Women Write Race. New Brunswick, New Jersey: Rutgers University Press, 2004.

=== Articles and essays ===
- 'Britannia Rules The Waves' in Decolonizing Tradition: The Cultural Politics of Modern British Literary Canons, Ed. Karen Lawrence. Urbana: University of Illinois Press, 1991; rpt in New Century Views: Virginia Woolf: A Collection of Critical Essays, ed. Margaret Homans, New York: Prentice Hall 1993; rpt in Virginia Woolf: Critical Assessments, ed. Virginia McNees, London: Helm, 1993.
- "Registering Objections: Grounding Feminist Alibis" in Reconfigured Spheres: Feminist Explorations of Literary Space, ed. Margaret Higonnet and Joan Templeton, Amherst: University of Massachusetts Press, 1994, 171-193.
- "Bonding and Bondage: Nancy Cunard and the Making of the Negro Anthology" in Borders, Boundaries and Frameworks (Essays from the English Institute) ed. Mae Henderson, New York: Routledge, 1994, 33-63.
- "Wrapped in the Stars and Stripes: Virginia Woolf in the U.S.A.," South Carolina Review, 1996.
- "Working Lips, Breaking Hearts: Class Acts in American Culture," SIGNS, Spring, 1997, vol 22 #3, 715-34.
- "Post Scriptum...Triste," LitCrit: Journal of the Indian School of Aesthetics 44 & 45, vol 23, 21-33.
- "Afterword" to Merry Pawlowski, ed., Virginia Woolf and Fascism. Macmillan 2001, 194-5.
- "Nancy Cunard and the Writing of Race in the Spanish Civil War," in Women Write the Thirties, ed. Robin Hackett, Jane Marcus, and Gay Wachman, University of Florida Press, 2004.
- Suptionpremises," Negrophilia, Modernism/Modernity, vol 9 #3, 2002, 491-502.
- "Amy Lowell, Body and Sou-ell" in Amy Lowell: American Modern, ed. Adrienne Munich and Melissa Bradshaw, New Brunswick, NJ: Rutgers University Press, 2004, 186-197.
- "Rebecca West" for Rediscovering Rebecca West, ed. Bernard Scweizer.

=== Reviews ===
- "A Tale of Two Cultures" Review essay covering MFS Woolf Issues, Vita and Virginia by Suzanne Raitt, and the play Vita and Virginia, the Sally Potter film of Orlando and three Woolf conferences, The Women's Review of Books, January 1994, 11-13.
- "An Embarrassment of Riches," Review Essay on Virginia Woolf in new Oxford, Penguin and Blackwell editions of the Works, The Women's Review of Books, March 1994, 17-18.
- "Domestic Interiors: The Art of Dora Carrington," The Women's Review of Books, October, 1994,11-12.
- The World Book Encyclopedia, 1995; entries on Margaret Drabble and Muriel Spark.
- "What I Want for Feminism," in Revisioning Feminism Around the World, Florence Howe, The Feminist Press, 1995, 47.
- Review essay on Woolf and Lessing, SIGNS, 1997.
- Note in Virginia Woolf Miscellany, 1999.
- "Putting Woolf in Her Place," Women's Review of Books, March 2001, 4-5 (with Snaith, Nicolson, Glenny, Light, Peach).
- "Nancy Cunard" Curtis Moffat Portfolio, London: 2001.
- "Nancy Cunard" in new Dictionary of National Biography, Oxford, UP, 2003.

=== Unfinished manuscripts ===
- A Key to a Room of One's Own. Unfinished manuscript; see, The Jane Marcus Collection, Mount Holyoke College
- White Looks: Modernism, Primitivism and Nancy Cunard. Unfinished; currently being annotated and edited by Jean Mills
- Ethyl Smyth

=== Dissertation ===
- Elizabeth Robins: A Biography, 1973. Northwestern University
