= Franklin Sirmans =

American art critic

Franklin Sirmans (born in New York City (Queens)) is an American art critic, editor, writer, curator and has been the director of the Pérez Art Museum Miami (PAMM) since October 2015. His initiatives there include ensuring that PAMM's art program reflects the community in Miami and securing donations. In his first six months at PAMM, he managed to secure the largest donation of works in the museum's short history, over a hundred pieces of art were donated by Design District developer Craig Robins.

== Early years ==
Sirmans was born in New York City, Queens and raised in Harlem, Albany and New Rochelle, New York. He attended the Manhattan Country School (Graduating Class of 1983), Albany Academy and New Rochelle High School and later received a BA degree (1991) in the history of art and English from Wesleyan University.

== Career ==
Early on in his career, Sirmans worked at the Dia Art Foundation in publications (1993–1996) and at the magazine Flash Art (1997–1998). He curated annual exhibitions for Los Angeles (1999), Atlanta (2003) and Baltimore (2005) as well as the shows Americas Remixed in Milan, Italy; Mass Appeal in Ottawa, Montreal, Halifax and Sackville, Canada and a Moment's Notice at the Inman Gallery, Houston, Texas in 2002. From 2001 until 2003 he curated One Planet Under A Groove: Contemporary Art and Hip Hop at the Bronx Museum of Art; the Spelman College Art Gallery, Atlanta; the Walker Art Center, Minneapolis and the Villa Stuck in Munich, Germany.

In 2004, he curated the show Ralph Bunche: Diplomat for Peace and Justice at the Queens Museum of Art. From 2005 until 2006 he was co-curator of Basquiat, which traveled from the Brooklyn Museum to the Los Angeles Museum of Contemporary Art and then to the Museum of Fine Arts in Houston. Sirmans became curator of modern and contemporary art at The Menil Collection in Houston in 2006 until 2009. In 2009 he was awarded the Gold Rush Award by the Rush Philanthropic Arts Foundation.

There he curated NeoHooDoo: Art for a Forgotten Faith, Steve Wolfe: Works on Paper and Vija Celmins: Television and Disaster, 1964–1966.

In 2010, he moved to the Los Angeles County Museum of Art (LACMA) as department head and curator of contemporary art where he remained until the fall of 2015. During his time with LACMA, he curated Maurizio Cattelan: Is There Life Before Death? (2010), Fútbol: The Beautiful Game (2014), Noah Purifoy: Junk Dada, Variations: Conversations in and Around Abstract Painting, Ends and Exits: Contemporary Art from the Collections of LACMA and the Broad Art Foundation, and was co-organizer of the exhibition Human Nature: Contemporary Art from the Collection. In addition he was co-curator of Make It Now: New Sculpture in New York at Sculpture Center.

Since October 2015, he has been the director of the Pérez Art Museum Miami (PAMM).

In 2019 he was selected as curate to a special section of Frieze New York, which shows artists from Just Above Midtown (JAM), the 1970s-80s Black Power Gallery.

== Other roles ==
Sirmans was an instructor at the Maryland Institute College of Art and Princeton University.

He was the 2005 Maryland Art Place Critic-in-Residence and served as artistic director of Prospect.3 New Orleans (2012–2014). He is a David C. Driskell Prize Winner (2007). He has served as editor of the magazine Flash Art and was Editor-in-Chief of the ArtAsiaPacific magazine. Sirmans wrote for several journals and newspapers on art and culture, including The New York Times, Newsweek International, Art in America, ARTnews, Grand Street and Essence Magazine.

On November 10, 2026, the Andy Warhol Foundation for the Visual Arts announced that Sirmans had been appointed as board chair.

== Personal life ==
He has a daughter, who was born in L.A. He is married to Jessica Plair Sirmans

== Publications ==
- One Planet Under a Groove (2001)
- A Mythical Metropolis Materializes in Queens (May 20, 2001)
- The No-Tech Way Toward Art-Making (September 2, 2001)
- Mapping a New, and Urgent, History of the World (December 9, 2001)
- Vija Celmins: Television and Disaster, 1964–1966 (January 31, 2011)
- Edward Kienholz, All – American Yawp (March 2012)
- L.A.’s Best, 2013—Franklin Sirmans (December 18, 2013)
- Basquiat and the Bayou (October 25, 2014)
- Prospect.3: Notes for Now (November 11, 2014)
- Sterling Ruby (Phaidon Contemporary Artists Series) (October 10, 2016); contributor
