= Notable American Women =

Book by Ben Marcus

- US 1st edition cover of the novel Notable American Women
- Author: Ben Marcus
- Language: English
- Genre: Novel
- Publisher: Vintage Books
- Publication date: March 2002
- Publication place: United States
- Media type: Print (Paperback)
- Pages: 243 pp (paperback first edition)
- ISBN: 0-375-71378-6 (paperback first edition)
- OCLC: 47650819
- Dewey Decimal: 813/.54 21
- LC Class: PS3563.A6375 N68 2002

Notable American Women is a novel written by Ben Marcus and published in March 2002.

== Plot introduction ==
The novel, written as a follow-up to Marcus's literary debut, The Age of Wire and String, deals with an abstruse Ohio family, which shares the author's surname. The Marcus family, owning four members, lives on a farm outside of an unnamed town; the reader encounters narration from three of those members, and is led through a seemingly implausible and temporally confusing description of the life events of the protagonist: a young Ben Marcus.

== Plot summary ==
Michael Marcus (the father of Ben Marcus, the character) opens Notable American Women with several warnings – most notably, that his own offspring, Ben, may very well be mentally handicapped – and ponders reflectively, "How can one word from Ben Marcus's rotten, filthy heart be trusted?"

With that, Ben Marcus (the author) launches into a lengthy first-person narration with Ben Marcus as guide, allowing the reader to decide if, and how, any of the words can be trusted. Playing with the English language in such a manner that his work has drawn comparison's to Anthony Burgess's A Clockwork Orange, among other novels, Marcus describes the cultish, recondite practises of his mother, her enigmatic mentor Jane Dark, and their legion of disciples as they attempt to create perfect stillness in the world by eliminating the "wind violence" of speech and, ultimately, physical movement. Dark, witty, and depressing in its ironic hilarity, Notable American Women allows the reader to delve into the mind of a well-meaning but obtuse young man, to glimpse into his turbulent upbringing full of radical experimentation and forced-breeding (among other things) and, possibly, to become attached.

In the end, the feminist Silentist group, to which Ben's mother Jane Marcus belongs, is facing issues of endangerment due to the largely unsuccessful breeding procedures involving Ben and the growing number of its member that are reaching a stillness level, which makes them obsolete. Jane Marcus, too, is nearing complete and utter emotional obliteration, using a complex system of body contortions, and takes the opportunity to address the reader. Like her estranged husband before her (whom she purportedly assisted in relegating to a hole in her backyard), Jane takes a turn at narration, providing for the novel's conclusion; addressing her husband with ultimatums and effrontery, the reader sees life from the last member of the core Marcus-family trinity, at which point the reader is left to draw her or his own conclusions.

== Literary significance and criticism ==
Widely applauded not just for his story but his wordplay, Ben Marcus's first novel received acclaim, despite little mainstream attention. Since producing Notable American Women, Marcus has authored The Father Costume, a collaborative work with painter/illustrator Matthew Ritchie, and edited The Anchor Book of New American Short Stories.

== Autobiographical content ==
When asked about his sharing a name with the main character and if the book was supposed to be autobiographical, Marcus responded "My family was very loving and I've never been to Ohio."
