= John Varoli =

American public relations practitioner

John Varoli is an American public relations practitioner who worked as a journalist in Russia from 1997 to 2010. In that period he wrote about 3,000 articles for publications including the St Petersburg Times, Radio Free Europe/Radio Liberty, Transitions magazine, the New York Times, the International Herald Tribune, Bloomberg News, The Art Newspaper, Art & Auction, and many more.

He also had experience working for TV, hosting in the first half of 2003 a TV program on Russia’s Kultura TV Channel called ‘’A Walk Down Broadway’’. From the middle of 2006 to the middle of 2007 he worked as a TV news producer at the Moscow bureau of Reuters, responsible for producing TV news on a wide variety of topics from across Russia and the former Soviet Union. Currently, he is an independent commentator on RTVI, an independent TV station in Russian.

== Early career ==
John Varoli graduated from Cornell University in 1990 with a degree in Russian Studies. He came to Russia in June 1992, and soon after joined with a group of young Russians to create Moscow’s first organization helping the homeless. He served as general director of Off the Streets Charity until 1996, leaving only to care of his new family and moving to St. Petersburg where he began to write for Radio Free Europe/Radio Liberty, and for the St Petersburg Times.

In 1998 The New York Times tapped him as a special features writer for St Petersburg and Northwest Russia. For example, he was the first western journalist to interview a Russian hacker. and he wrote special investigative reports, such as covering a rash of brazen thefts from Russian museums,

He also wrote regularly as a features writer for Bloomberg News, and for the London-based monthly, The Art Newspaper. As one of the only full-time foreign correspondents in St Petersburg, he contributed to other publications, including People magazine, Departures and Art & Antiques.

In 2004, Bloomberg News appointed Varoli to its newly created arts department (Muse), and to write about the art market in Russia. From 2004 to 2010, he wrote often for Bloomberg, and The Art Newspaper. He covered Russian auctions in London and New York, as well as interviewing Moscow’s secretive billionaire collectors, and tracking their acquisitions. He also wrote on the problem of fakes on the Russian art market.

== John Varoli PR & V Startup Agency ==
In early 2011, Varoli left journalism and established John Varoli Public Relations, which worked with both corporate clients and wealthy individuals and other figures in the art world. In 2016, he was a founder of V Startup Agency, a PR firm in New York City that works with technology companies and other companies. Varoli remains a partner at the company.
