= Melissa Chiu =

Australian museum director (born 1972)

- Born: 1972 (age 53–54); Darwin, Northern Territory, Australia
- Education: University of Western Sydney (BA, PhD); University of New South Wales (MA)
- Occupations: Museum director, curator, author
- Known for: Director of Hirshhorn Museum and Sculpture Garden
- Spouse: Benjamin Genocchio

Melissa Chiu (born 1972) is an Australian museum director, curator and author, and the director of the Hirshhorn Museum and Sculpture Garden in Washington, DC.

She is a board member of the Association of Art Museum Directors, the American Alliance of Museums, and the Museum Association of New York. She is also on the founding advisory committee for the USC American Academy in China and has participated in the advisory committees for the Gwangju and Shanghai Biennales.

In 2026 she was appointed Director of the Solomon R. Guggenheim Museum in New York City, beginning on September 1, 2026.

== Education ==
Chiu was born in Darwin, Northern Territory, Australia, in 1972 to parents who were medical professionals. Chiu was educated in Sydney, where she completed a Bachelor of Arts degree in Art History at the University of Western Sydney and then an MA (Arts Administration) at the College of Fine Arts, University of New South Wales. In 2005 she completed a PhD at the University of Western Sydney focusing on Chinese contemporary art in the diaspora.

== Career ==
Chiu worked as an independent curator for several years at the beginning of her career. From 1993 until 1996, she worked at the University of Western Sydney Collection as a curator. In 1996, Chiu collaborated with a group of Asian Australian artists, performers, filmmakers and writers to establish Gallery 4A, a nonprofit contemporary art center devoted to promoting dialogue in the Asia-Pacific region. Chiu was founding Director of Gallery 4A, later renamed the 4A Centre for Contemporary Asian Art. In 2001 she was the curator during the center's transition to a two-story city owned heritage building in Sydney's Chinatown.

In 2001, Chiu moved to New York to serve as the Asia Society's curator of contemporary Asian and Asian American art—the first curatorial post of its kind in an American museum. In 2004, she was appointed Asia Society's museum director. She initiated a number of initiatives at the Asia Society Museum, including the launch of a contemporary art collection to complement the museum's Rockefeller Collection of traditional Asian art. As museum director of the Asia Society, and its vice president of Global Art Programs, she was responsible for programming its Park Avenue museum and future museum facilities under construction in Hong Kong and Houston.

Chiu has curated over thirty international exhibitions mainly focused on the art and artists of Asia. Her major curatorial credits include Zhang Huan: Altered States (2006) and Art and China's Revolution (2008) with Zheng Shengtian, one of the first historical appraisals of Chinese art from the 1950s through 1970s and Nobody's Fool: Yoshitomo Nara (2010) with Miwako Tezuka. She was awarded a Getty Curatorial Research Fellowship in 2004.

=== Hirshhorn Museum ===
In 2014, Chiu became the first foreign-born director of the Hirshhorn. One of the first exhibitions put on after Chiu assumed leadership was a co-curation of Iranian artist Shirin Neshat. Previously, the museum had only produced a handful of shows featuring female artists. The 2017 exhibition of “Yayoi Kusama: Infinity Mirrors” attracted nearly 500,000 visitors and set new attendance records, as well as bringing new attention to the artist's work.

In Chiu's first year of leadership the museum's board size was doubled and its first international members were added. The largest gifts in the museum's history were secured through two multimillion-dollar donations. By 2018, fundraising grew by 75 percent and attendance increased by 28 percent.

In 2023, Chiu was the lead judge on The Exhibit: Finding the Next Great Artist, a reality TV series that aired on MTV and the Smithsonian Channel and featured seven artists competing for their art to be displayed at the Hirshhorn and a cash prize. Chiu was instrumental in the creation of the series and screened the contestants. Alongside host Dometi Pongo, in each episode Chiu visits with the artists in the studio as they are preparing their works and provides a critique before consulting with the other panelists to determine the winner.

Under Chiu's leadership, the Hirshhorn sculpture garden was dramatically reconceptualized as a " what a sculpture garden should be in the twenty-first century". Architect Hiroshi Sugimoto, who had previously led the renovation of the museum's lobby, was commissioned to redesign the garden.

== Publications ==
Chiu has published in art magazines and journals, and has authored several books, including Breakout: Chinese Art Outside China (2007), published by Charta and Chinese Contemporary Art: 7 Things You Should Know (2008), published by AW Asia. Her latest books include Contemporary Asian Art with Benjamin Genocchio, published by Thames & Hudson and Monacelli Press, and an edited anthology, Contemporary Art in Asia: A Critical Reader, published by MIT Press.

== Media work ==
In 2010, Chiu joined the Sunday Arts television show on PBS WNET to conduct a series of interviews with cultural leaders. Interview subjects have included William Kentridge, Shirin Neshat, Yoko Ono, Tan Dun, Chuck Close and Antony Gormley.

In addition to her museum work, Chiu is a regular speaker at international conferences and symposia and has delivered lectures at such institutions as Harvard University, Columbia University, Yale University and the Chinese Central Academy of Fine Arts in Beijing, among others. She was the speaker at the National Gallery of Australia's inaugural Betty Churcher Memorial Lecture in 2022.

== Personal life ==
Chiu has a daughter. She is an avid ice skater. She is married to Benjamin Genocchio, an Australian art critic and former editor-in-chief of Artnet News. Chiu and Genocchio co-authored Asian Art Now, originally published in 2010.
