= William Seward Burroughs =

William Seward Burroughs may refer to:

- William Seward Burroughs I (1857–1898), inventor of adding machine
- William S. Burroughs (1914–1997), author and grandson of the above
- William S. Burroughs Jr. (1947–1981), author and son of the above
