= Indigenous education in Canada =

Education for First Nations, Inuit, and Métis people in Canada

Indigenous education in Canada refers to education in Canada for First Nations, Inuit, and Métis, also known collectively as Indigenous peoples in Canada, per Section 35 of the Constitution Act, 1982 the "Aboriginal peoples of Canada", or occasionally as F.N.M.I. students (First Nations, Métis, and Inuit).

Due to Canada's colonial history and federal constitution indigenous education is a shared jurisdiction between Indian bands, Métis organizations, provincial and territorial governments, and the federal government.

Educational attainment has historically been significantly lower for indigenous peoples in Canada compared to the non-indigenous population, and this is considered one of Canada's major social problems. Significant debate and controversy surround the issue of how to improve indigenous education outcomes. In particular there is controversy over how to interpret and respond to the history of the Canadian Indian residential school system, which was imposed on indigenous students from the late 19th to the late 20th century. Debate also surrounds issues of funding, access (especially in remote communities), cultural appropriateness, language revival, and accommodations for FNMI students in non-indigenous school systems.

== Right to education ==
According to the Ontario chapter of the Canadian Federation of Students, indigenous peoples have a right to education under the terms of the Royal Proclamation of 1763, Constitution Act, 1982, and the United Nations Declaration on the Rights of Indigenous Peoples Act (Canada), and the United Nations' Declaration on the Rights of Indigenous Peoples, but that these rights have historically been violated by policies that have substituted assimilation in European-Canadian culture via the school system for education in the students' own culture and community, and that this constitutes acts of genocide.

== Higher education ==
The educational attainment gap between indigenous and non-indigenous Canadians in trades programs and college diplomas has narrowed considerably since 2006, and was nearly gone by 2016. However, the gap in university degree attainment was still quite large. Among non-indigenous Canadians, 45% had a university degree, compared to just 22% of self-identified indigenous people, 23% of First Nations people living off-reserve, and only 15% of First Nations people living on-reserve.

Indigenous peoples face significant barriers to postsecondary education. As a result, far fewer First Nations, Métis and Inuit in Canada have a university degree than non-Indigenous Canadians. Education is vital to the reconciliation process and universities are committed to helping Indigenous students achieve their potential through higher education. Universities help advance reconciliation by revitalizing Indigenous languages, ensuring Indigenous representation in governance and leadership structures, and bringing Indigenous knowledge and culture to campus. Still much more remains to be done.

— Universities Canada

== IBET PhD Project ==
Founded in 2021, the IBET PhD Project fosters equitable and inclusive research environments to increase the presence of Indigenous and Black academics in STEM. It provides financial support and academic mentoring to eligible incoming Canadian and permanent resident (CPR) Black and Indigenous graduate students registered in a full-time Engineering PhD program at McMaster University, University of Ottawa, University of Toronto, Queen's University, University of Waterloo, University of Western Ontario (branded as Western University), the University of British Columbia, the University of Calgary, Carleton University, University of Manitoba, McGill University, Ontario Tech University, Toronto Metropolitan University, University of Windsor, York University, Concordia University and the University of Saskatchewan.

== Jurisdiction in British Columbia ==
Unlike Indigenous communities in other provinces and territories in Canada, First Nations in British Columbia have a unique legal framework granting them jurisdiction to run schools, independent of provincial jurisdiction.
