= Raúl Zamudio =

American art critic

- Born: Tijuana, Mexico
- Citizenship: American
- Education: Brooklyn College, Graduate Center of the City University of New York; Vassar College; Université Laval; Columbia University; Institute of Fine Arts, New York University
- Occupations: Art critic, curator, art historian, educator
- Known for: Contemporary art criticism and curatorial work

Raúl Zamudio is a New York-based independent curator, art critic, art historian and educator.

== Background ==
Zamudio was born in Tijuana, Mexico. He was raised in San Diego, California, and moved to New York City, where he currently lives and works.

He received undergraduate and graduate degrees in art history from the Brooklyn College and the Graduate Center of the City University of New York. He also studied at the following institutions: Vassar College, Université Laval, Columbia University, and the Institute of Fine Arts, New York University. He is an alumnus of the Whitney Museum Independent Study Program in Critical Studies.

== Curatorial work ==
He was Curator-at-Large, Pristine Galerie, Monterrey, Mexico; International Art Director, Other Gallery, Beijing, Shanghai; Director of Exhibitions, White Box, New York, New York; Curator-at-Large, the:artist:network, New York, New York, and Curator, Empty Circle Brooklyn. Recently, Raúl Zamudio has opened an exhibition space in his home in the West Village, New York City, under the name of Proyectos Raul Zamudio. He has curated or co-curated more than 150 exhibitions in the Americas, Asia and Europe including solo shows of Dennis Oppenheim, Javier Téllez, Miguel Angel Rios, Bik Van der Pol, Gordon Cheung, Riiko Sakkinen, Wojtek Ulrich, Shahram Entekhabi, Sun Yao, and Lui Lei, as well as group exhibitions including The Twilight of the Idols (Madrid), The Metamorphosis (Shanghai), Body Double (Wrocław), The Picture of Dorian Gray (Mexico City), Under Your Skin (New York City), The Phantom Limb (Chicago), The Crystal Land Revisited (Newark), That Obscure Object of Desire (Monterrey, Mexico), The Bermuda Triangle (Miami), Under the Volcano (San Jose, Costa Rica) and Theater of Cruelty (New York City).

Raúl Zamudio's curatorial work is distinguished by an expansive approach underscored, for example, in the following exhibitions: Rayuela, which used the structuralist configuration of the similarly titled novel by the writer Julio Cortázar as curatorial framework; The Passenger, based on the film by the director Michelangelo Antonioni; The Crystal Land Revisited, which was conceptually organized around an essay by the artist Robert Smithson; In the Future the Curator Will Point and Say, "Those Objects Over There is an Exhibition", based on an aphorism by Marcel Duchamp; The Pavilion of Realism, based on Gustave Courbet's rejection from the 1855 Exposition Universelle, which Zamudio presented in Shanghai during the 2010 World's Fair; another exhibition that incorporated a medical condition as thematic; and Art After Dark And After, a talk show in which he served as host that was both an interview program with artists and an art exhibition masked as dialogue and discussion. Apart from organizing exhibitions in galleries, art fairs, art festivals, alternative art spaces, academic and museum institutions, Zamudio was co-curator, "Here Is Where We Jump!", La Bienal 2013, El Museo del Barrio, New York, New York; co-curator, "City Without Walls", 2010 Liverpool Biennial; co-curator, Constellations: 2009 Beijing 798 Biennial; artistic director/curator, Garden of Delights: 2008 Yeosu International Art Festival; co-curator, Turn and Widen: 2008 Media_City Seoul International Media Art Biennial; and co-curator of an official collateral exhibition titled Poles, Apart, Poles Together presented at the 2005 Venice Biennial. He is one of the curators of the 2024 Gangwon International Triennial, Korea His exhibitions have been reviewed in numerous periodicals including Art in America, Art Nexus Art Notes, Diario ABC, L Magazine, New York Art World, The New York Times, Randian, and the Village Voice.

== Criticism and writing ==
As an art critic, Raúl Zamudio has written more than 200 published texts of which many have been translated into Chinese, Finnish, German, Italian, Japanese, Korean, Polish, Portuguese, and Spanish. He is author, co-author, or contributor to more than 70 art-related books and exhibition catalogs, and some of the artists he has written essays on include Francis Alys, Waltercio Caldas, Lygia Clark, Gordon Cheung, Lucio Fontana, Julio Galán, Damien Hirst, Rebecca Horn, Teresa Margolles, Cildo Meireles, Ana Mendieta, Gabriel Orozco, Helio Oiticica, Santiago Sierra, Jesús Rafael Soto, Javier Téllez, and Teresa Serrano. He is corresponding editor for Art Nexus, and his texts have appeared in numerous periodicals including Contemporary, TRANS> Arts Culture Media, Estilo, Art in Culture, Art Map, Zingmagazine, Art Notes, Laboratory, Framework: The Finnish Journal of Contemporary Art, Journal of the West, Tema Celeste, La Tempestad, Public Art, and Flash Art. Raúl Zamudio's writing has been cited by Reed Johnson of the Los Angeles Times in Johnson's article on war and beauty.
