= Motorman =

Motorman may refer to:

- Motorman (rail transportation), a rail vehicle operator
- Motorman (ship), a member of a ship's engine department responsible for maintaining the ship's systems
- Motorman (drilling), a member of an offshore drilling crew responsible for engines on an oil rig
- Motorman, a 1972 novel by David Ohle

== See also ==
- Operation Motorman, a military operation in 1972 by the British Army in Northern Ireland
- Operation Motorman (ICO investigation), a 2003 investigation into data use by the British press
