= Louise Blouin =

Canadian magazine publisher

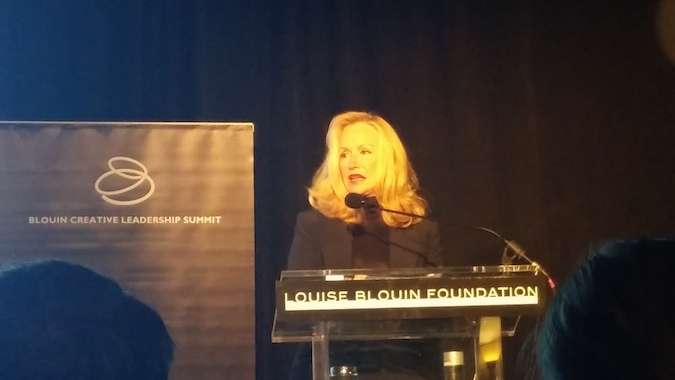
- Louise Blouin, 2015
- Born: Louise Thérèse Blouin; 1958 or 1959 (age 67–68); Dorval, Montreal, Quebec, Canada
- Occupation: Magazine publisher
- Known for: Louise Blouin Media
- Spouses: David MacDonald Stewart; John MacBain; Mathew Kabatoff

Louise Thérèse Viger Blouin (born 1958 or 1959) is a Canadian magazine publisher. She is owner of Louise Blouin Media, which she founded.

== Biography ==
Blouin was born in Dorval, a suburb of Montreal, in Quebec, Canada, the youngest of six children of Edouard Blouin and Yolande Viger Blouin, who owned and operated a life insurance brokerage. Her father died when she was fifteen. She appeared as the representative of Canada at the International Debutante Ball in January 1978. She studied commerce at McGill University for a year, and later transferred to Concordia University. She did not graduate. She worked as a stock analyst and as a stockbroker.

In the early 1980s, Blouin married David MacDonald Stewart, a member of the Canadian MacDonald tobacco family. The marriage was annulled within a year.

Blouin later married John MacBain and the couple acquired Auto Hebdo, a classified car trading magazine, in 1987. The business grew into Trader Classified Media. Although the couple separated in 2000, Blouin did not sell her remaining shareholding until 2004. After the separation she became chief executive of the London auction house Phillips de Pury, owned by her new companion Simon de Pury; in December 2002, after a year, she resigned. She started Louise Blouin Media in 2003, and moved into art publications, including Art+Auction, sold by the LVMH group.

In 2005 Blouin started the Louise T. Blouin Foundation, an international organisation for creativity and the arts. In October 2006 the foundation opened the Louise T. Blouin Institute in Shepherd's Bush in west London.

Blouin married Mathew Kabatoff, who worked for the Louise Blouin Foundation, in France in June 2011.

In 2016, her name appeared in the Panama Papers as registered owner of five companies in the British Virgin Islands. She commented, "I didn't even know. . . It is not relevant. It is not because you are in the Panama list that you did something wrong. You are the one informing me about that. You can't assume everyone with a BVI [company] has done something wrong".

In 2023, Blouin's La Dune home in the Hamptons sold for $89 million. The property on Gin Lane in Southampton had been listed for as much as $150 million in 2022.

Blouin lives in Switzerland.

== Recognition ==
In 1993 Blouin was one of approximately 200 "Global Leaders of Tomorrow" listed by the World Economic Forum, a Swiss foundation.
