= Contemporary (magazine) =

- Editor: Various
- Categories: Art magazines
- Frequency: monthly (10 issues per year)
- Circulation: 7,500
- Founded: 2002
- Final issue: 2008
- Company: Art21 Ltd
- Country: United Kingdom
- Based in: London
- Language: English
- Website: www.contemporarymagazine.com
- ISSN: 1028-5040

Contemporary was a monthly visual arts magazine based in London. Founded and edited as The Green Book by Keith Spencer as a quarterly publication, it re-emerged under the title Contemporary Art in 1993. On the death of Spencer, the title was acquired by Gordon and Breach Publishing (G+B), and produced four issues under the editorship of Lynne Green, Spencer's deputy.

The magazine finally found its feet as a committed contemporary art publication in 1996 under the editorial control of Keith Patrick and with the change of title to Contemporary Visual Arts, later abbreviated to CVA. During this period the magazine achieved sales of nearly 20,000, including 5,000 subscribers, with distribution mainly in the UK, Europe, the States and Australia. Its base at this time was the former Peek Freans biscuit factory in Bermondsey, London, the site of several key early exhibitions of the YBA generation.

With the collapse of the G+B parent company in 2001, the title was acquired by Art:21 and reappeared as Contemporary in January 2002 although no longer with an exclusive commitment to the visual arts. In 2003 a sister publication, Contemporary 21, was launched. Initially media-focused, with special issues dedicated to painting, sculpture, video art and performance, it would later embrace a wider range of topics, from art collecting to the relationship between visual art and architecture. In 2006 Contemporary published its first Annual, featuring 50 emerging artists nominated by its network of world correspondents. In 2008 the magazine relocated to Panama City, where it ceased publication after failing in an attempt to start a Spanish-language edition.

In May 2009, it was reported that the publisher, Brian Muller, had not paid the magazine's contributing writers for a year.

== Notable contributors ==
- Ian Carr-Harris
- Dennis Cooper
- Liam Gillick
- Mark Gisbourne
- Tony Godfrey
- RoseLee Goldberg
- Katerina Gregos
- Martin Herbert
- Jens Hoffmann
- Katie Kitamura
- Thomas McEvilley
- Lucy McKenzie
- Hans Ulrich Obrist
- Christine Redfern
- Sally O'Reilly
- Barry Schwabsky
- Katy Siegel
- Won-il Rhee
- Raúl Zamudio

== Editors-in-chief ==
- Brian Müller (2008)
- Emiliano Valdés (2007–08)
- Michele Robecchi (2005–07)
- Roger Tatley (2004–05)
- Mark Rappolt (2003–04)
- Keith Patrick (1996–03)
- Lynne Green (1995–96)
- Keith Spencer (1993–94)
