= Peter Fuller =

British art critic and magazine editor

Peter Michael Fuller (31 August 1947 – 28 April 1990) was a British art critic, documentarian, author (of more than 15 books), and founder and editor of the magazine Modern Painters.

== Early life and education ==
Peter Fuller was born in Damascus, Syria, and educated at Epsom College and Peterhouse, Cambridge.

== Career ==
In the early 1970s, Fuller wrote for the radical newspapers Black Dwarf and Seven Days, and was responsible for establishing the latter, "a short-lived Marxist glossy weekly". Fuller subsequently freelanced elsewhere.

Fuller was the founder and founding editor of the quarterly magazine Modern Painters, launched in 1987, a work "principally... bring[ing] attention to British artists." reflecting his admiration for the aesthetic principles of John Ruskin. In the spring of 1989 he was appointed art critic of The Sunday Telegraph and The Daily Telegraph, the former of which carried his final review on Sunday, 29 April 1990.

Fuller wrote regularly for Art Monthly UK and New Society for nearly 20 years, alongside publishing such books as Art and Psychoanalysis. Originally a follower of the critic John Berger, Fuller moved to the political right in mid-life, coming into conflict with his former allies Art & Language. The archive of Fuller's letters, journals and writings is held at the Tate Gallery in London.

== The Peter Fuller Memorial Foundation ==
The Peter Fuller Memorial Foundation, a registered English charity (no. 1014623), was set up in 1991 by Stephanie Fuller, the Appointee and a Trustee of the Foundation, following his death, and dissolved in 2017. The Foundation organised the annual Peter Fuller Memorial Lecture for nearly two decades, with events held at institutions including Tate Britain, Tate Modern, Tate Liverpool, University College London, the Slade School of Fine Art and the Courtauld Institute of Art. The Foundation was formally constituted by trust deed on 23 September 1992. A 2015 deed records Stephanie Fuller as the Founder, together with original trustees Roger Scruton, Anthony O’Hear, Charles Rycroft and John Bellamy. The same deed records that the Founder held the power to appoint new trustees under clause 10(b) of the trust deed, and that later trustees included Roy Oxlade, Sylvia Leda Turner and Laurence Ruskin Fuller.

== Personal life ==
Fuller's spouse in the final years of his life was his wife, Stephanie (née Burns), an Australian-British sculptor and painter.

Peter Fuller died at age 42 in a single-vehicle car accident on the M4 motorway in Berkshire, England on 28 April 1990, an accident that also injured three others, including his wife and 3-year-old son. He is buried in Stowlangtoft, Suffolk, UK.

== Books ==
Peter Michael Fuller was the author of more than 15 books on aesthetics, creativity, art, and its psychology.

- Fuller, Peter (1976). Die Champions: Psychoanalyse des Spitzensportlers [The Champions: Psychoanalysis of the Top Athletes]. Frankfurt am Main, Germany: S. Fischer.
- The Champions: The Secret Motives in Games and Sports, New York, NY: Urizen Books, 1977.
- The Champions: The Secret Motives in Games and Sports, London, England: Allen Lane, 1978.
- The Psychology of Gambling (with Jon Halliday), Harmondsworth: Pelican, 1977.
- Art and Psychoanalysis, London, England: Writers and Readers Publishing Cooperative, 1981; The Hogarth Press, 1988.
- Beyond the Crisis in Art, London, England: Writers and Readers, 1981.
- Robert Natkin, New York: Harry N. Abrams, Inc., 1981.
- Seeing Berger: A Reevaluation of Ways of Seeing, London, England: Writers & Readers, 1981.
- Aesthetics After Modernism, London, England: Writers and Readers, 1983.
- The Naked Artis: 'Art and Biology' and Other Essays, London, England: Writers & Readers, 1983.
- Images of God: The Consolations of Lost Illusions, London, England: Chatto and Windus, 1985; London: The Hogarth Press, 1990.
- The Australian Scapegoat: Towards and Antipodean Aesthetic, University of Western Australia Press, Western Australia, 1986.
- Fuller, Peter; Crompton, Susan & Cork, Richard (1988). Henry Moore. London, England: Royal Academy of Arts-Weidenfeld & Nicolson.
- Seeing Through Berger, The Claridge Press, 1988.
- Theoria: Art and the Absence of Grace, Chatto and Windus, 1988.
- Left High and Dry: the Posturing of the Left Establishment, The Claridge Press, 1990.
- Marches Past, The Hogarth Press, 1991.
- Peter Fuller's Modern Painters: Reflections on British Art, (John McDonald, ed.), London: Methuen, 1993.
- Fuller, Peter (January 1993). Henry Moore: An Interpretation (1st hardback ed.). London, England: Methuen. ASIN B003U86ZHQ.

- Fuller, Peter (1994). O'Hear, Anthony (ed.). Henry Moore: An Interpretation (1st paperback ed.). London, England: Methuen. ISBN 9780413685100.

== Films ==
Peter Fuller made a number of documentaries with Mike Dibb, including;

- Somewhere Over the Rainbow - art and psychoanalysis with Robert Natkin and Peter Fuller, 50 minutes, BBC, 1979
- Fields of Play - series exploring the role of play in every area of our lives from childhood and learning to gambling and war games, 5x60 minutes, BBC, 1979
- Naturally Creative - wide-ranging film essay on the origins of human creativity, 90 minutes, Channel 4, 1986/7
