= Won-il Rhee =

Korean digital art curator (1960–2011)

Won-il Rhee

Won-il Rhee (Korean: 이원일; Hanja: 李圓一; 2 November 1960 – 11 January 2011) was a South Korean digital art curator. He was born and died in Seoul.

Rhee was the artistic director in 2002 and 2006 of the Media City Seoul Biennale. He was the leading curator of the Total Museum of Art and co-ordinator of the Korean Pavilion for the 1995 Venice Biennale. Also, he served as executive head of the exhibition team for the Third Gwangju Biennale and was one of the curators of the Fourth Prague Biennale in 2009.

From 1996 to 2002, he was head curator at the Sung-Kok Museum of Art and in 2002 he was appointed artistic director of the Media City Seoul Biennale. In 2003, he became chief curator at the Seoul Museum of Art. He also served as the Asian Editor for art publications such as Contemporary Magazine in London and Flash Art in Milan.

== Curatorial projects ==
- Media City Seoul Biennale, Seoul, Korea, 2002 & 2006
- ElectroScape, Zendai Museum of Modern Art, Shanghai, China, 2005
- Co-Curator for Shanghai COOL Duolun Museum of Art, Shanghai, 2005
- Advisory Programmer to DMC, Seoul, 2004
- Curator for Portrait-Landscape, Gwangju, 2005
- Curator for City Net Asia, Seoul, 2003
- Curator for the Asia-Oceania-Korea Section of the Gwangju Biennale, 2004
- Curator of the Asian Section at the Lodz Biennale, Lodz, Poland, 2004
- Curator for Digital Sublime, Taiwan, 2004
- Curator of Grounding Reality-25 Young Chinese Artists, Seoul Arts Center, Seoul, 2005
- Curator of Silent Power-German Expressionists, Zendai Museum of Modern Art, Shanghai, 2006
- Curator of Thermocline of Art: Asian Waves, ZKM, Karlsruhe, 2007
- Curator of Julian Schnabel, World Art Museum, Beijing, China, 2007
- Co-Curator of Asia-Europe Mediations, Poznan Museum, Poland
- Co-Curator of BIACS 3: 3rd International Biennial of Seville, YOUniverse, 2008
- Artistic Director of DIGIFESTA 2010, Gwangju Biennial, Korea
- Curator of Nanjing Documenta 2010, China
- Co-Curator of Prague Biennial, 2009–2013, Czech Republic
- Co-Commissioner of Vancouver Olympic Sculpture Biennial 2009-2011, Canada

On January 11, 2011, Rhee died suddenly of a heart attack.
