= Mitacs =

Canadian nonprofit national research organization

- Formation: 1999
- Founder: Steve Halperin, Luc Vinet, Don Dawson, and Nassif Ghoussoub
- Type: Non-profit
- Location: Canada
- Website: https://www.mitacs.ca
- Formerly called: Mathematics of Information Technology and Complex Systems

Mitacs (formerly known as Mathematics of Information Technology and Complex Systems) is a nonprofit national research organization that, in partnerships with Canadian academia, private industry and government, operates research and training programs in fields related to industrial and social innovation.

== History ==
Mitacs was founded by Canadian mathematicians in 1999. The organization, whose name originally stood for "Mathematics of Information Technology and Complex Systems", worked in the field of mathematical sciences and associated disciplines but has since expanded. In 2004, the Mitacs Accelerate program was launched and has since supported over 10,000 internships nationally.

== Programs ==
As of late 2020, Mitacs operates six main programs:

=== Accelerate ===
The organization's flagship program has supported over 10,000 research internships for graduate students and postdoctoral fellows since 2004 and has since replaced the Natural Sciences and Engineering Research Council's Industrial Postgraduate Scholarships Program.

=== Elevate ===
The two-year program has the objective of providing postdoctoral fellows with professional and leadership development training with a partner organization.

=== Globalink ===
The international program supports two-way research collaboration between Canada and research partners abroad. In 2016, the Globalink Research Internship program welcomed 565 students across Canada.

=== Canadian Science Policy Fellowship ===
The program matches PhD-level researchers to government agencies to influence evidence-based policy-making.

=== Entrepreneur International ===
The program offers travel grants to Canadian start-ups housed in university-linked incubators. The grant enables start-ups to connect with international incubators.

=== Business Strategy Internship ===
The program provides funding to students who develop innovative projects designed to help Canadian businesses.

=== IBET PhD Project Partnership ===
Mitacs provides IBET PhD Project Fellows with internships via its Accelerate, Globalink and Business Strategy programs. The partnership helps support Indigenous and Black scholars in Canada pursuing doctoral degrees in STEM programs.

== Awards ==
Mitacs presents annual awards in seven categories:

- Alejandro Adem Legacy Award for Outstanding Innovation — Indigenous
- Mitacs Award for Outstanding Innovation — International
- Mitacs Award for Outstanding Innovation — Master's
- Award for Outstanding Innovation — PhD
- Mitacs Award for Outstanding Innovation — Postdoctoral
- Mitacs Award for Exceptional Leadership — Professor
- Mitacs & NRC–IRAP Award for Commercialization

== Funding ==
Mitacs is jointly funded by the federal and provincial Canadian governments, academic partners and research partners. Between 2006 and 2015, the organization received $128 million in investments from the federal government. In 2015, the federal government pledged $56.4 million over four years (starting in 2016) to Mitacs in support of graduate-level research and development internships.
