= William S. Burroughs Jr. =

American novelist (1947–1981)

- Born: William Seward Burroughs III; July 21, 1947; Conroe, Texas, U.S.
- Died: March 3, 1981 (aged 33); DeLand, Florida, U.S.
- Occupation: Novelist
- Spouse: Karen Perry (1969–1974)
- Parent(s): William S. Burroughs; Joan Vollmer
- Writing career
- Notable works: Speed; Kentucky Ham

William Seward Burroughs III (July 21, 1947 – March 3, 1981), also known as William S. Burroughs Jr. and Billy Burroughs, was an American novelist. He bears the name of his father, William S. Burroughs, as well as his great-grandfather, William Seward Burroughs I, the inventor of the Burroughs adding machine. (Note: His father's name is the exact same as his grandfather's name, without any generational designation (which would be "Jr." or "II"), then the suffix "Jr." ended up in the third 'William Seward Burroughs' generation. To avoid confusion, William S. Burroughs Jr. is sometimes referred to as William Seward Burroughs III, or, most often, Billy Burroughs, which is how his friends used to call him.) He wrote three novels, two of which were published as Speed (1970) and Kentucky Ham (1973). His third novel, Prakriti Junction, begun in 1977, was never completed, although extracts from it were included in his third and final published work Cursed From Birth.

Burroughs Jr. underwent a liver transplant in 1976 after developing cirrhosis. He died in 1981, at the age of 33, from alcoholism and liver failure. Burroughs Jr. appears briefly in the 1983 documentary Burroughs, about his father, in which he discusses his childhood, his liver problems, and his relationship with his family. In the documentary, John Giorno called him "the last beatnik."

== Childhood ==
Burroughs was born on July 21, 1947, in Conroe, Texas, to novelist William S. Burroughs and Joan Vollmer, near the New Waverly farm where an as-yet unpublished Burroughs Sr was attempting to grow cash crops, supplemented with cannabis. During her pregnancy Vollmer was consuming orally two Benzedrine inhalers a day, or approximately 500 mg of powdered amphetamine. Burroughs Jr was born addicted to amphetamine and immediately went into withdrawal. Both his parents were alcoholics, with Burroughs Sr also addicted to opiates. Farmhand and family friend, Herbert Huncke, would drive fifty miles to Houston to obtain Benzedrine for himself and Volmer, and paregoric for himself and Burroughs Sr while the family lived in Texas.

On September 6, 1951, Billy's father shot and killed his mother in Mexico City in what he claimed, and later denied, was a drunken game of 'William Tell'. In chapter three of his second novel, Kentucky Ham, Burroughs relates his memory of the day his mother was shot dead, as well as the subsequent reunion with his father after he was freed from a Mexico City prison. While his father stayed in Mexico, Billy went to live with his paternal grandparents, Mortimer and Laura Lee Burroughs, in St. Louis, Missouri. In spring 1952, when Billy was nearly 5, he moved with his grandparents to Palm Beach, Florida, where they relocated their store, Cobblestone Gardens. By his own account, Billy said his grandparents were kind and reassuring; yet as they grew older, and he grew into adolescence, they were unable to relate.

When Billy was 13, his grandparents asked William S. Burroughs to take Billy back. He agreed, and Billy was sent alone by air to Tangiers, Morocco, to live with his father. In Tangiers, Billy was introduced to marijuana, and men attempted to rape him. By his father's own admission, the visit was a failed attempt to rehabilitate their relationship. After Burroughs' lover, Ian Sommerville, convinced William that his son was irrevocably homesick, Billy returned to Palm Beach.

When Billy was fifteen, he accidentally shot his best friend in the neck with a rifle, causing an almost fatal wound. This event caused him to suffer a nervous breakdown. According to Kentucky Ham, Billy thought his friend was dead and ran away from home to seek refuge in a girlfriend's family fallout shelter. He planned to flee to California, convinced that he was a murderer. Yet his friend lived, and the police ruled the wounding unintentional. Still, this act did not go unnoticed in the exclusive Palm Beach community, and the story of the manner in which his mother had perished at the hands of his father again gained wide circulation. Billy was sent to a mental hospital in St. Louis for help, but threats to run away caused Mortimer and Laura to bring their grandson home. Bill then attended Green Valley, an alternative school based on the principles of English educator A. S. Neill, in Orange City, Florida, from 1965 to 1966.

== Drug addiction ==
Living in a wealthy section of Palm Beach, Billy Burroughs began to spend more time out of his grandparents' care and beyond the reach of local authorities. Burroughs became addicted to amphetamines and resorted to criminal behavior to obtain them, forging prescriptions and visiting doctors' offices to steal prescription pads. He was soon arrested, but he was not an adult and had the tragic story of his parents' life to temper criminal proceedings against him. Nevertheless, his second novel begins with his condemnation to a four-year suspended sentence and required admission to the Federal Narcotics Farm at Lexington in Kentucky. This prison was one of two U.S. Federal prison hospitals treating persons convicted of federal drug crimes in the United States from 1935 until 1973.

After being released on parole in 1968, he quit his addiction to amphetamines and returned to The Green Valley School, a private institution run by Reverend Von Hilsheimer in Orange City, Florida. The Green Valley School was where Burroughs met his future wife, a 17-year-old Jewish girl from Savannah, Georgia, named Karen Perry, who came from a privileged background. The two formed a romantic relationship and were married in 1969, settling in Savannah. Burroughs began to write; Perry worked as a waitress.

== Alcoholism ==
The marriage disintegrated in 1974 when Karen left Burroughs because of his chronic alcoholism. Despite the publication of his novels, he was increasingly alienated from friends and family, and there were long periods when his whereabouts were unknown. When he showed up in Boulder, Colorado, to visit his father and Allen Ginsberg at Ginsberg's Buddhist institute at the Jack Kerouac School of Disembodied Poetics, he had the appearance of a "derelict."

In 1976, during a dinner with Ginsberg and his father, Burroughs began vomiting blood. When the heaving would not stop, he was admitted to Colorado General Hospital, where it was discovered that he was suffering from cirrhosis of the liver. The hospital was one of only two institutions in 1976 that performed liver transplants. Thomas Starzl had performed over 100 transplants, with a survival rate of less than 30%. Nevertheless, Billy profited from Starzl's care. Although Burroughs spent months in and out of the hospital, and there were many serious complications, the operation was successful. However, despite the obvious risks, Burroughs kept drinking. Many people, notably Ginsberg, tried to encourage him to quit, but Burroughs's self-destructive behavior continued.

Eventually, Burroughs began to express hostility and anger towards his father. He published a damning article in Esquire, explaining how his life was "ruined" by his father's actions. The estrangement between father and son was never reconciled.

== Death ==
In 1981, Burroughs stopped taking his anti-rejection drugs. Allen Ginsberg was notified that Burroughs had returned to Florida to reconnect with the founder of the Green Valley School. Shortly after, Burroughs was found lying chilled, drunk, and exhausted in a shallow ditch at the side of a DeLand, Florida, highway on March 2. A passerby took him to a local hospital, where he died the following day at 6:35 a.m. of acute gastrointestinal hemorrhage associated with micronodular cirrhosis. He was 33 years old. Burroughs was cremated and his ashes buried in Boulder, Colorado.

== Writing style ==
William S. Burroughs Jr. wrote two autobiographical novels, and was working on a third. He began writing poetry at the Green Valley School when he was 21 in 1968 and completed his first novel Speed in 1970. The novels relate the experiences of a teenage runaway in the early 1960s, and are comparable in style and content to both Jack Kerouac’s On the Road and his father's Junkie. Some time after the death of Burroughs Jr., his father invited David Ohle to edit the manuscript of his late son's unfinished novel Prakriti Junction. The manuscript was unpublishable so, instead, Ohle compiled a work from the manuscript, the last journals and poems of Burroughs Jr., and correspondence and interviews with those who knew him.

== Bibliography ==
- Speed (1970)
- Kentucky Ham (1973)
  - Speed and Kentucky Ham: Two Novels (1993; two-novel compilation)
- Cursed from Birth: The Short, Unhappy Life of William S. Burroughs Jr. (2006; David Ohle)
  - Prakriti Junction—unfinished: writing started during 1977–1978, later compiled and incorporated in David Ohle's Cursed from Birth
