= Ben Marcus =

American author and professor

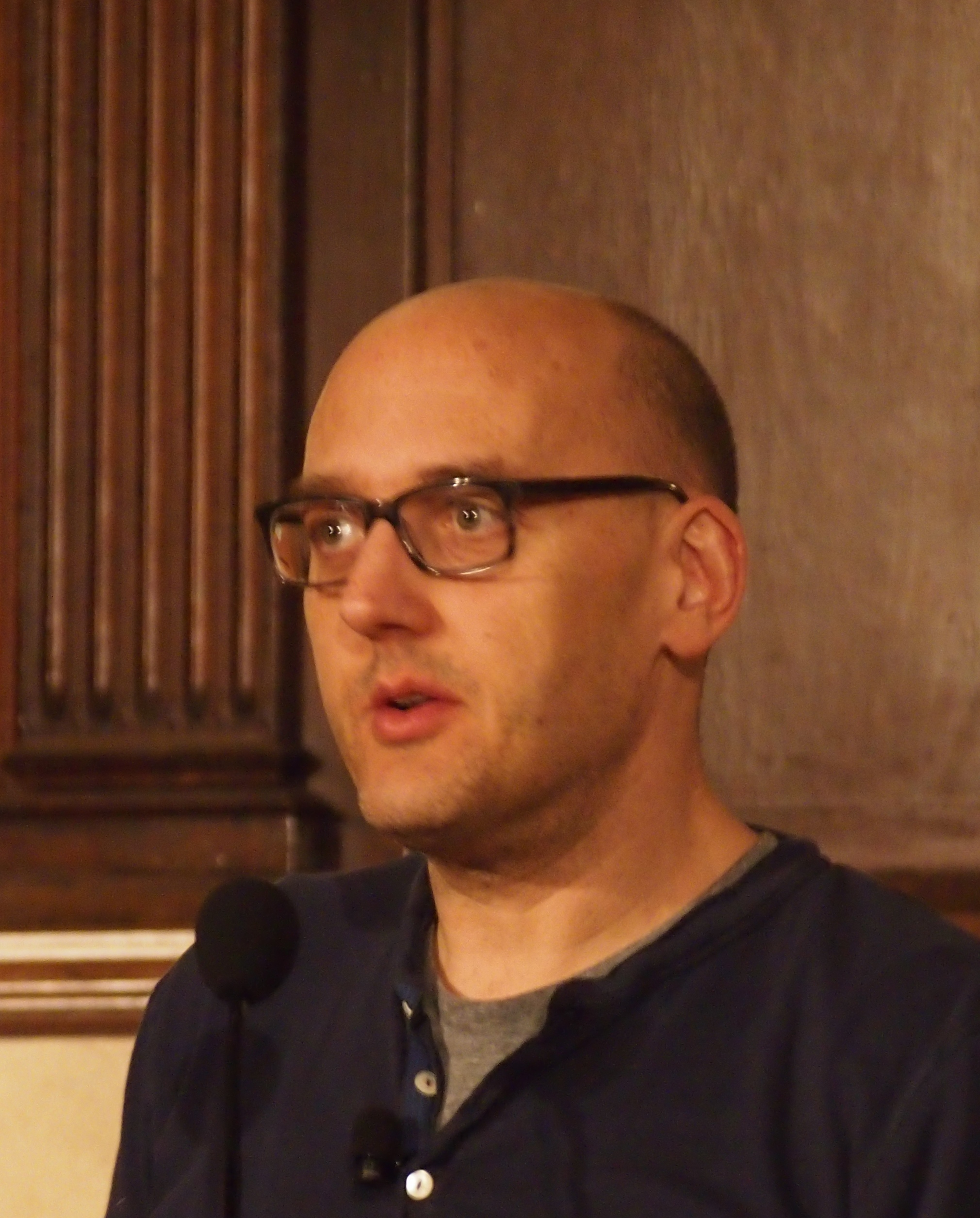
- Marcus at Lannan Center
- Born: October 11, 1967 (age 58)
- Education: New York University; Brown University
- Occupation: Author
- Spouse: Heidi Julavits
- Children: Delia Marcus and Solomon Marcus
- Writing career
- Genres: Short Story, Novel
- Movements: Experimental literature; Postmodernist
- Website: benmarcus.com

Ben Marcus (born October 11, 1967) is an American author and professor at Columbia University. He has written five books of fiction. His stories, essays, and reviews have appeared in publications including Harper's, The New Yorker, The Paris Review, Granta, The New York Times, GQ, Salon, McSweeney's, Time, and Conjunctions. He is also the fiction editor of The American Reader. His latest book, Notes From The Fog: Stories, was published by Alfred A. Knopf in August 2018.

== Life ==
Marcus grew up in Austin, the son of a retired mathematician and the literary critic and Virginia Woolf scholar Jane Marcus. His father is Jewish and his mother is of Irish Catholic background; Marcus had a Bar Mitzvah.

Marcus received his bachelor's degree in philosophy from New York University and an MFA from Brown University.

Marcus is a professor at Columbia University School of the Arts. He is the editor of The Anchor Book of New American Short Stories, and the fiction editor at The American Reader. For several years he was the fiction editor of Fence.

Marcus is married to the writer Heidi Julavits, with whom he has two children. They live in New York City and also have a seasonal house in Maine.

== Influences ==
Marcus's influences include Virginia Woolf, Franz Kafka, Donald Barthelme, Richard Yates, Flannery O'Connor, Thomas Bernhard, Padgett Powell, J. M. Coetzee, David Ohle, Kōbō Abe, Garielle Lutz, and George Saunders.

== Awards and honours ==
- 1999 Whiting Award
- 2000 National Endowment for the Arts, Fellowship in Fiction
- 2008 Morton Dauwen Zabel Award from the American Academy of Arts and Letters
- 2009 Creative Capital Award for Innovative Literature
- 2013 Berlin Prize Fellowship
- 2013 Guggenheim Fellow
- 2014 Frank O'Connor International Short Story Award shortlist Leaving the Sea
- 2014 Jewish Quarterly-Wingate Prize, shortlist, The Flame Alphabet

== Bibliography ==
=== Novels ===
- Notable American Women (2002)
- The Flame Alphabet (2012)

=== Short story collections ===
- The Age of Wire and String (1995)
- Leaving the Sea (2014)
- Notes from the Fog, Knopf, (2018), ISBN 978-1101947456

=== Short stories ===
- "Elevation of the Prison Bed", The Barcelona Review, 1997
- The Father Costume (2002), novella with art by Matthew Ritchie
- Tool, a short story written as a review of a woodworking tool, The Believer, Issue 8, November 1st., 2003
- "My views on the darkness are well known". Harper's Magazine. 318 (1909): 44–46. June 2009.
- "The Dark Arts", The New Yorker, May 20, 2013
- "The Loyalty Protocol", Granta 122: Betrayal, Winter 2013 (Subscription Required)
- "The Grow Light Blues", The New Yorker, June 22, 2015
- "Cold Little Bird", The New Yorker, October 19, 2015

=== Other works ===
- Text for the photography book by Kahn & Selesnick Scotlandfuturebog (2002). Aperture Foundation, New York City, ISBN 0-89381-935-2.
- The Anchor Book of New American Short Stories (2004), editor
- The Moors (2010)
- New American Stories (2015), editor
- Chemical Seuss, from benmarcus.com
- Thomas Bernhard, from benmarcus.com
- On the Lyric Essay, from benmarcus.com
- Why experimental fiction threatens to destroy publishing, Jonathan Franzen, and life as we know it: A correction, a response to an essay by Jonathan Franzen, from Harpers.org, October 2005
