= Roger Tatley =

British gallery director

Roger Tatley is a gallerist and former art magazine editor now based in London.

He's a senior director at Goodman Gallery, having previously been part of the leadership teams at Marian Goodman Gallery, Hauser & Wirth, and Alison Jacques Gallery.

Tatley worked for Artforum, Dazed & Confused, Booth–Clibborn Editions, and Contemporary magazine before being appointed editor in chief of Modern Painters by James Truman in 2006, when it relocated from London to New York.

He has edited a number of books on art, photography, film and architecture and was listed in the Evening Standard's '1000 Most Influential People in London' in 2014 and 2015.
