= Kentucky Ham =

1973 novel by William S. Burroughs, Jr.

- First edition
- Author: William S. Burroughs, Jr.
- Language: English
- Genre: Autobiographical
- Publisher: E. P. Dutton
- Publication date: 1973
- Publication place: United States
- Media type: Print (Hardcover and Paperback)
- Pages: 194 pp (first edition, hardback)
- ISBN: 0-525-13850-1 (first edition, hardback)
- OCLC: 650064
- Dewey Decimal: 813/.5/4
- LC Class: PZ4.B9719 Ke PS3552.U749

Kentucky Ham, published in 1973, was the second novel by William S. Burroughs, Jr., the son of Beat Generation author William S. Burroughs.

Like its predecessor, Speed, the book is an autobiographical novel based upon Burroughs' own life. It covers his time spent in a prison farm in Kentucky, working on a fishing boat in Alaska, and visiting his father's old haunt, Tangiers, among other events.

Burroughs Jr. went on to write a third novel, Prakriti Junction, but it was never completed. Jennie Skerl, the academic who has published critical reviews of Burroughs' father's work, the Beats and Jane Bowles, befriended Billy and reported that his third novel included material about his liver transplant in 1976. Material from the third novel was edited into his third published work, Cursed From Birth.

As with Speed, Kentucky Ham is often erroneously listed as part of the Burroughs, Sr. literary canon. In 1993, it was republished in an omnibus edition alongside Speed.
