= Speed (novel) =

1970 novel by William S. Burroughs, Jr.

- Author: William S. Burroughs Jr.
- Cover artist: Ira Cohen (photo)
- Language: English
- Genre: Autobiographical novel
- Publisher: Olympia Press
- Publication date: 1970
- Publication place: United States
- Media type: Print (Paperback & Hardback)
- Pages: 160
- ISBN: 0-7004-0050-8 (first edition, paperback)
- OCLC: 240291
- Dewey Decimal: 813/.5/4
- LC Class: PZ4.B9719 Sp3 PS3552.U749
- Followed by: Kentucky Ham

Speed, first published in 1970, was the first of three published works by William S. Burroughs Jr., the son of the Beat Generation author William S. Burroughs.

== Summary ==
Set in the mid-1960s, the story follows a teenaged Billy Burroughs as he hitchhikes from his grandmother’s home in Palm Beach, Florida to the streets of New York City, where the novel takes place over the course of several months.

As he drifts through the city under the constant influence of speed, Burroughs’ reflects on his interactions with acquaintances and the experiences that accompany his relentless search to remain high.

== Impact ==
Burroughs' second work, Kentucky Ham, is similar in some aspects to Speed and elucidates the other adventures had by him after Speed was written. His third work, Cursed From Birth, was compiled by David Ohle and published posthumously.

Due to the author's having an almost identical name to his more famous father, and because the book deals with themes often featured in his father's writings, Speed is often erroneously credited to the elder Burroughs.
