= Graeme Wood (journalist) =

Canadian-American journalist (born 1979)

- Education: Harvard University (BA)
- Occupation: Journalist
- Website: Official Website

Graeme Charles Arthur Wood is an American-Canadian staff writer for The Atlantic and a lecturer in political science at Yale University. He was awarded the Edward R. Murrow Press Fellowship of the Council on Foreign Relations and won the Canadian Governor General's Award for English-language non-fiction for his book The Way of the Strangers: Encounters with the Islamic State.

== Early life and education ==
Wood grew up in Dallas and graduated from St. Mark's School of Texas in 1997. He attended Deep Springs College before transferring to Harvard College, graduating in 2001. While at Harvard, he wrote for The Harvard Crimson.

== Career ==
Wood is a staff writer at The Atlantic and was a contributing editor beforehand. He has also written for The Cambodia Daily, The New Yorker, The American Scholar, The New Republic, Bloomberg Businessweek, Culture+Travel, The Wall Street Journal and the International Herald Tribune. He served as books editor of Pacific Standard.

Wood has been a lecturer in political science at Yale University since 2014.

In 2024, Wood wrote an article titled, The UN's Gaza Statistics Make No Sense, published by The Atlantic, which became the subject of controversy. In the article, Wood stated that "It is possible to kill children legally, if for example one is being attacked by an enemy who hides behind them. But the sight of a legally killed child is no less disturbing than the sight of a murdered one." Some media outlets criticized the magazine for publishing the article.

=== Recognition ===
Wood was awarded the 2015–2016 Edward R. Murrow Press Fellowship of the Council on Foreign Relations. Prior, he was awarded a 2009 Reporting Fellowship Grant from the South Asian Journalists Association

In 2017, Wood won the Canadian Governor General's Award for English-language non-fiction for his book The Way of the Strangers: Encounters with the Islamic State.
