= Trader Classified Media =

Trader Classified Media NV
- Formerly: Hebdo Mag
- Company type: Private
- Industry: Classified advertising, automotive
- Founded: 1987; 38 years ago (as Hebdo Mag)
- Founder: John MacBain, Louise Blouin
- Defunct: 2007
- Successors: Trader Media East; Trader Corporation
- Area served: North America, Europe, Russia
- Key people: Sebastian Baldwin (CEO); David McMinn (CFO)
- Products: Classified advertising
- Parent: Thoma Bravo
- Website: trader.com (former)

Trader Classified Media NV (formerly Hebdo Mag) was an international classified advertising company based in the Netherlands and run by Canadian John MacBain.

== History ==
The company was founded in 1987 as Hebdo Mag by John MacBain and Louise Blouin MacBain, a married couple.

In 1990, the company made it first European publishing acquisition of La Centrale in France. This marked the companies growth outside of the Canadian and North American markets and into other markets like the European market. The company also pushed several other European companies such as Swedish Gula Tidningen and Hungarian Expressz.

On Aug 15, 1997, the company was purchased by CUC International for $440MIL

In April 2000, the company went public and changed its name to Trader.com NV from Hebdo Mag.

In September 2002, the company was renamed to Trader Classified Media NV. . In 2004, acquired 60% of the private job portal InfoJobs.

In 2005, Trader Media East was established comprising the Russian, Baltic, CIS and Eastern European operations of Trader Classified Media.

In 2006, John MacBain began liquidation and selling of the company so he could focus on the McCall MacBain Foundation.

In July 2006, Schibsted finalised the acquisition of parts of Trader Classified Media NV in Spain, Latin America, France, Italy and Switzerland.

In February 2006 The Yellow Pages Group, publishers of directories in Canada purchased the Canadian and US assets of Trader Classified Media along with the domain trader.com, creating Trader Corporation.
