= InfoJobs =

Spanish private online job bank

InfoJobs is a private online job board. It specialises in the Spanish, Italian and Brazilian markets. The company was founded in 1998 within Grupo Intercom and is based in Barcelona. It is owned by the Adevinta Group (Schibsted Media Group) through its subsidiary in Spain.

== History ==
In 1998, Nacho González-Barros, Director of Human Resources at Intercom, created InfoJobs.net. In 1999, the platform stopped using Lotus Notes technology and switched to an Oracle platform. The venture capital company CORSABE acquires 10% of the company (2001).

In 2004, the Canadian media group Trader Classified Media acquired 60% of InfoJobs.net. The company ceases to be Spanish after the acquisition in 2006 by the Norwegian communication group Schibsted. Schibsted acquired 60% of InfoJobs.net from Trader Classified Media and 6 months later increased its stake to 93.56%, while Grupo Intercom held 6.4% of the company's shares.

Between 2007 and 2008, new sales offices were opened in Galicia, the Basque Country, Zaragoza, Valencia, Seville, San Sebastian, Alicante and Vigo. In addition, a branch was opened in Second Life. In 2009, the Scandinavian media group Schibsted Media Group took control of the company.

By sending to all italian registered accounts a message, on October 26, 2025, Infojobs italian branch announces its shut down.
