= Gordon Cheung =

British artist (born 1975)

- Born: 1975 (age 50–51); London, United Kingdom
- Education: Central Saint Martins, BA (Hons); Royal College of Art, MFA
- Occupation: Artist
- Years active: 1998 - present
- Known for: Painting
- Website: https://www.gordoncheung.com/

Gordon Cheung (born 1975) is a British artist who lives and works in London.

== Early life ==
Gordon Cheung was born and raised in London, UK, to parents from Hong Kong. Cheung received his BA (Hons) at Central Saint Martins and his MFA at the Royal College of Art. During his time as a student, he organised an assembly that exhibited 172 MA art graduates in two disused Victorian school buildings.

== Exhibitions ==
He was nominated for the Laing Art Solo Award in July 2007. Some of his exhibitions include The Promised Land in Jack Shainman Gallery, Art in the Age of Anxiety in Volta New York City, and The Four Horsemen of the Apocalypse in The New Art Gallery Walsall. Cheung's first US solo museum exhibition was at the Arizona State University Art Museum in 2010.

== Collections ==
Cheung's work is held in public collections including the Hirshhorn Museum and Sculpture Garden, the Whitworth Art Gallery, the Yale Center for British Art, the Asian Art Museum, the British Museum and the Government Art Collection. His work is also held by the Museum of Modern Art in New York.
