= The Age of Wire and String =

Book by Ben Marcus

- Hardcover edition
- Author: Ben Marcus
- Language: English
- Genre: Postmodern literature
- Published: October 31, 1995
- Publisher: Alfred A. Knopf
- Publication place: United States
- Media type: Print
- Pages: 140 pp.
- ISBN: 0-67942-660-4

The Age of Wire and String is Ben Marcus's first book, published in 1995. The book is composed of 8 sections, divided into 41 parts, which combine technical language with lyrical imagery to form a sort of Postmodern catalog by turns surreal, fantastic, and self-referential.

== Contents ==
The book begins with an "argument", which sets the terms and the tone for the rest of the book:

This book is a catalog of the life project as prosecuted in the Age of Wire and String and beyond, into the arrangements of states, site, and cities and, further, within the small houses that have been granted erection or temporary placement on the perimeters of districts and river colonies. The settlement, in clusters and dispersed, has long required a document of secret motion and instruction—a collection of studies that might serve to clarify the terms obscured within every facet of the living program.

The rest of the book is divided into eight sections—Sleep, God, Food, The House, Animal, Weather, Persons, and The Society—each including five or six short fictions and ending with a glossary of terms. These terms are either invented (e.g. "CLOTH-EATERS" or "GERVIN"), or redefinitions of known words and concepts (e.g. "CARL—Name applied to food built from textiles, sticks, and rags.").
