= Skin Trade =

Skin Trade may refer to:

- The Skin Trade or Dark Visions, a 1989 horror fiction anthology, or the included story "The Skin Trade" by George R. R. Martin
- Skin Trade, novel by Reggie Nadelson
- Skin Trade (novel), a 2009 Anita Blake: Vampire Hunter novel by Laurell K. Hamilton
- "Skin Trade" (Beavis and Butt-head), an episode of Beavis and Butt-head
- Skin Trade, a 2004 short film featuring Jack J. Yang
- Skin Trade (film), a 2014 film directed by Ekachai Uekrongtham, and starring Dolph Lundgren and Tony Jaa
- "Skin Trade" (song), a 1986 song by Duran Duran

== See also ==
- Fur trade
- Sex industry
