= Louise Blouin Media =

Art magazine and book publishing company based in New York City

- Company type: Private
- Industry: Publishing
- Founded: 2003
- Founder: Louise Blouin
- Website: blouinartinfo.com

Louise Blouin Media was an art magazine and book publishing company based in New York City. Founded by Louise Blouin, it published the magazines Art+Auction, Gallery Guide and Modern Painters until 2020. It owns Somogy, a French art book publisher, and the databases Art Sales Index and Gordon's. Artinfo.com was launched in 2005 and later changed to blouinartinfo.com, which is now defunct.

== History ==
LTB Holding Ltd. was set up in 2001 by Louise Blouin. Louise Blouin Media was started in 2003. A website, artinfo.com, was launched in 2005 and later changed to blouinartinfo.com. It has regional editions in Australia, Canada, China, Germany, Hong Kong, Brazil, India, Russia and the United Kingdom. The company acquired or started the Art & Auction, Gallery Guide, Museums, Culture+Travel and Modern Painters magazine titles and bought the databases Art Sales Index and Gordon's and the French art book publisher Somogy.

In 2006 the company closed Spoon magazine, which it had recently bought. In 2008, two years after it was started, Culture+Travel was closed down.

Former Village Voice film critic J. Hoberman began writing for blouinartinfo in 2012.

== Controversies ==
In December 2011, Louise Blouin Media was sued for defamation in United States district court for a September 16, 2011, article written by Noah Charney on blouinartinfo.com, in which he wrote that a forensic art expert "was part of a family of art forgers, and that he had been planting the forensic evidence into the questionable works himself".

In 2010, an article in the New York Post noted controversy over payments to freelance writers for Blouin's arts publications. One group, WAAANKAA (Writers Angry At Artinfo Not Kidding Around Anymore), demanded back payments of $18,000. In December 2013, Artinfo.com abruptly laid off 26 international employees. The New York Observer posted a 1000-word internal email from Blouin to staff explaining that the move was part of a new direction in which, "One person doing all and not good we need less of one but many more."

In February 2014, the New York Post reported that two former executives were suing Blouin for $250,000 in pay and commissions. In 2016 further reports emerged of the company failing to pay "about 40 journalistic freelancers money... with freelancers owed anywhere from $500 to more than $20,000".

President David Gursky resigned in early 2017, following the departure of editors-in-chief of Modern Painters Scott Indrisek, and "Blouin Lifestyle" Karen Quarles. It was reported that "at some of the publications, staffers began leaving the names of contributing editors off the masthead because it would have been misleading to pretend to have large staffs when many were not getting paid," and that "the work often used generic bylines to obscure the fact that it was being written overseas." In January 21 it was reported that the remaining employees checks were bouncing and that the entire finance department of "one guy based in India... is scrambling to ‘fix’ the problem [by] sending PayPals to people who have no money."
