= Heidi Julavits =

American author, editor, and professor

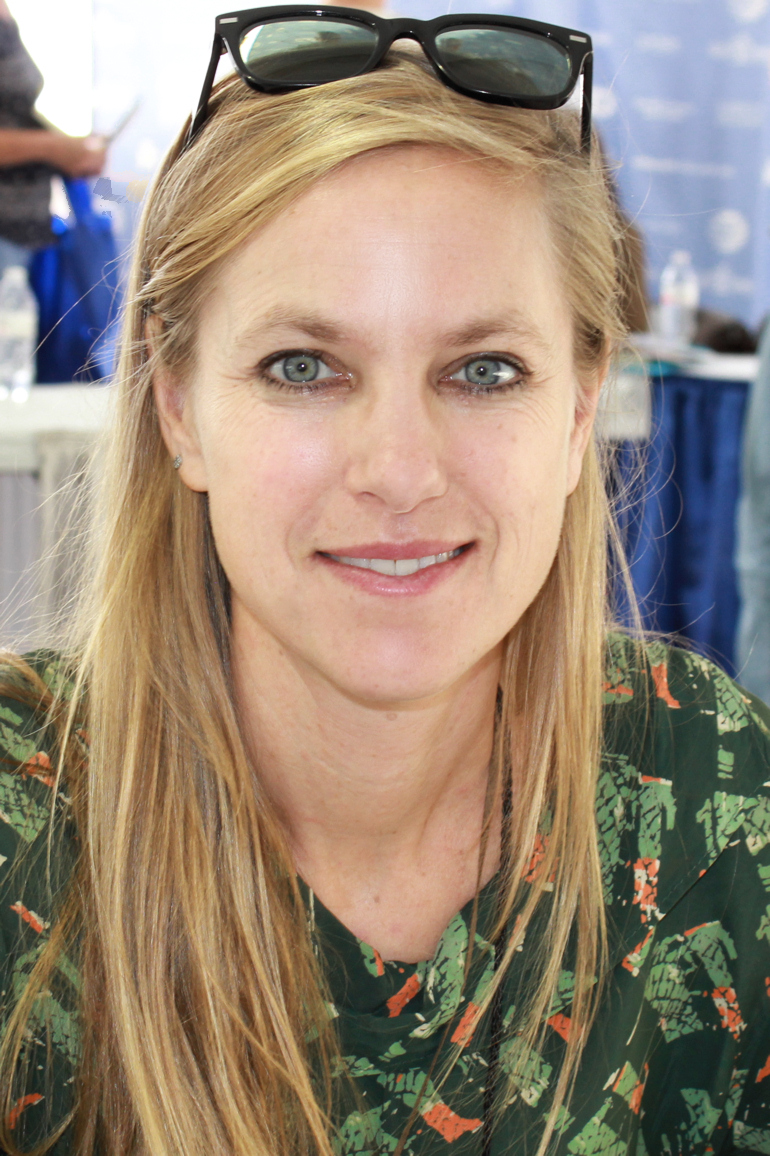
- Julavits at the 2015 Texas Book Festival
- Born: April 20, 1968 (age 58); Portland, Maine, U.S.
- Education: Dartmouth College; Columbia University (MFA)
- Occupation: Author
- Spouse: Ben Marcus
- Children: Delia Marcus & Solomon Marcus
- Writing career
- Notable works: The Vanishers, The Folded Clock: A Diary, Directions to Myself

Heidi Suzanne Julavits (born April 20, 1968) is an American author and was a founding editor of The Believer magazine. She has been published in The Best Creative Nonfiction Vol. 2, Esquire, Culture+Travel, Story, Zoetrope All-Story, and McSweeney's Quarterly. Her novels include The Mineral Palace (2000), The Effect of Living Backwards (2003), The Uses of Enchantment (2006), and The Vanishers (2012). She is an associate professor of writing at Columbia University. She is a recipient of the PEN New England Award and a 2007 Guggenheim Fellowship.

== Early life ==
Heidi Julavits was born and grew up in Portland, Maine, before attending Dartmouth College. She later earned an MFA from Columbia University.

== Career ==
=== The Believer and others ===
Julavits wrote the article "Rejoice! Believe! Be Strong and Read Hard!" (subtitled "A Call For A New Era Of Experimentation, and a Book Culture That Will Support It") in the debut issue of The Believer, a publication that attempts to avoid snarkiness and "give people and books the benefit of the doubt."

In 2005, she told The New York Times Magazine culture writer A.O. Scott how she decided on The Believer's tone: "I really saw 'the end of the book' as originating in the way books are talked about now in our culture and especially in the most esteemed venues for book criticism. It seemed as though their irrelevance was a foregone conclusion, and we were just practicing this quaint exercise of pretending something mattered when of course everyone knew it didn't." She added that her own aim as book critic would be "to endow something with importance, by treating it as an emotional experience."

She has also written short stories, such as "The Santosbrazzi Killer", first published in The Lifted Brow and then republished in Harper's Magazine.

=== Novels ===
Julavits is the author of four novels: The Mineral Palace (2000), about which Library Journal wrote, "the writing is superb"; The Effect of Living Backwards (2003); The Uses of Enchantment (2006), which The New Yorker called "a sophisticated meditation on truth and bias" and Publishers Weekly described as "beautifully executed"; and The Vanishers (2012), which won the PEN New England Fiction Award.

=== Nonfiction ===
Julavits co-edited Women in Clothes (2014) with Sheila Heti and Leanne Shapton. The book is about how the clothing women wear defines and shapes their lives, and features the voices of 639 women of all nationalities.

Julavits is the author of the book The Folded Clock: A Diary (2015), which the Los Angeles Times described as "an engaging portrait of a woman's sense of identity, which continually shape-shifts with time."

== Personal life ==
Julavits lives in Maine and Manhattan with her husband, the writer Ben Marcus, and their children.

== Bibliography ==
=== Novels ===
- The Mineral Palace. 2000.
- The Effect of Living Backwards. 2003.
- The Uses of Enchantment. 2006.
- The Vanishers. 2012.

=== Other works ===
- Women in Clothes. 2014.
- The Folded Clock: A Diary. 2015.

=== Nonfiction ===
- Directions To Myself: A Memoir of Four Years. 2023.

=== Short fiction ===
Title	Year	First published in	Reprinted in
Marry the One Who Gets There First	1998	Esquire (1998)	The Best American Short Stories 1999
The Santosbrazzi killer	2009	Harper's Magazine 318/1904 (Jan 2009)	
This feels so real	2012	Harper's Magazine 325/1950 (Nov 2012)	

=== Short nonfiction ===
- Julavits, Heidi (March 1, 2003), "Rejoice! Believe! Be Strong and Read Hard!: A Call for a New Era of Experimentation, and a Book Culture That Will Support It", Believer
- Julavits, Heidi (April 23, 2009), "Getting Lost", Granta 106: New Fiction Special - Online Edition
- Julavits, Heidi (July 7, 2017), "The Art at the End of the World: A pilgrimage (with children) to see Spiral Jetty, Robert Smithson's profound testament to catastrophe.", New York Times Magazine
