= IBET PhD Project =

2021 Canadian education program

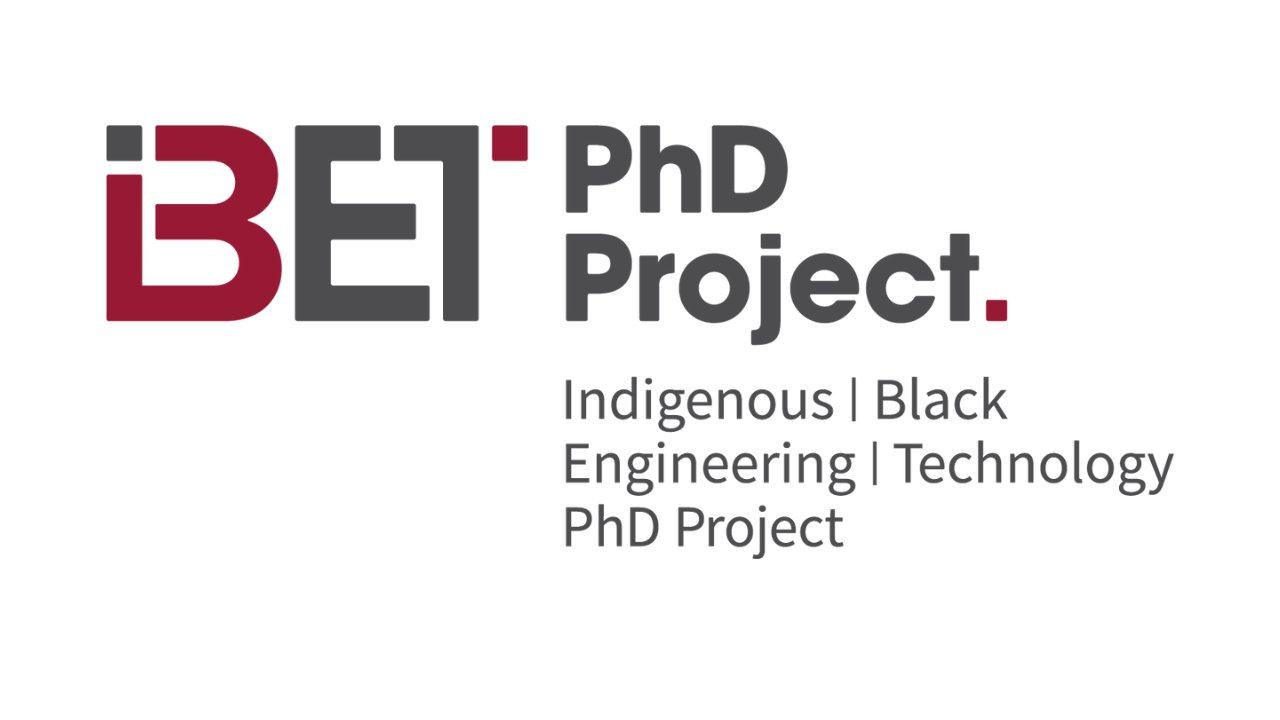
- Awarded for: Four-Year $30,000 annual IBET Momentum Fellowships awarded to foster equitable and inclusive research environments to increase the presence of Indigenous and Black academics in STEM
- Sponsored by: 18 academic institutions across Canada
- Location: Waterloo, Ontario, Canada
- Established: 2021
- Website: www.ibetphd.ca

The Indigenous Black Engineering Technology PhD Project (IBET PhD Project) is a Canadian program that was created in 2021 to reduce the barriers that exist for Indigenous and Black scholars in Canada pursuing doctoral degrees in STEM programs. The Project provides financial support and academic mentoring to eligible incoming Canadian and permanent resident (CPR) Black and Indigenous graduate students registered in a full-time Engineering PhD program at 18 academic institutions across Canada: McMaster University, University of Ottawa, University of Toronto, Queen's University, University of Waterloo, University of Western Ontario (branded as Western University), the University of British Columbia, the University of Calgary, Carleton University, University of Manitoba, McGill University, Ontario Tech University, Toronto Metropolitan University, University of Windsor, York University, Concordia University and the University of Saskatchewan.

== History ==
Indigenous and Black scholars have traditionally been underrepresented as faculty members in Canadian Engineering schools. In 1966, civil engineering professor Barrington DeVere Batchelor became the first Black professor at Queen's University. In 2021, there were less than 15 Indigenous or Black faculty members in engineering fields in Ontario, including only one in the University of Waterloo's Faculty of Engineering's roster of approximately 350 professors.

In response to the Black Lives Matter movement that was active after the 2020 murder of George Floyd, University of Waterloo's Faculty of Engineering sought to increase the number of Indigenous and Black professors teaching in Engineering programs across Canada, while creating and supporting a talent pipeline for PhD students with these same diverse backgrounds. To help build an academic partnership that would achieve this end, the University of Waterloo's Faculty of Engineering joined corresponding faculties at University of Ottawa, Queens University, University of Toronto, McMaster University and University of Western Ontario to form an academic partnership.

Together, these six academic institutions launched the IBET PhD Project in January, 2021. The Project that emulated a U.S. program called the PhD Project that was introduced in 1994 to increase the presence of faculty of colour in U.S. business schools. The PhD Project has garnered a 90% doctoral completion rate with 97% of PhD Project members.

The IBET PhD Project was later expanded to include University of Alberta, the University of British Columbia, University of Calgary, Carleton University, the University of Manitoba, McGill University, Ontario Tech University, Toronto Metropolitan University, the University of Windsor, York University, Concordia University, and the University of Saskatchewan. There are now 18 academic institutions participating in the program.

It is estimated that by 2026, close to 200 Black and Indigenous PhD Fellows will be pursuing their PhDs through the IBET PhD Project.

== Project benefits ==
IBET Momentum Fellowships are a central part of the IBET PhD Project. Recipients receive up to $30,000 per annum for four years as they pursue doctoral degrees and undertake specialized Engineering, Design and Technology research. Fellows also receive academic mentoring, as well as mentoring by industry leaders in the areas of Engineering and Technology. In addition, they are eligible for paid internships through Mitacs, a nonprofit Canadian research organization. Mitacs provides the internships via its Accelerate, Globalink and Business Strategy programs.

The IBET PhD Project hosts an annual conference where its Fellows can build their professional networks. The current Fellows give short talks – or poster presentations – on their research progress and newly added Fellows introduce their proposed research projects.

== Selection criteria ==
The IBET PhD Project seeks to change the academic landscape within the next five to 10 years by increasing the number of Indigenous and Black Engineering professors teaching and researching in universities across Canada.

IBET Momentum Fellowships are awarded to eligible incoming CPR Black and Indigenous (a person who self-identifies as First Nations Status/Non-Status, Metis or Inuit as defined in the Canadian Constitution Act of 1982) graduate students registered in a full-time Engineering PhD program at one of the participating academic institutions.

Selection of Fellows is a competitive process. Applicants must meet qualifying admissions requirements (normally a cumulative average of 80%) for their chosen Faculty of Engineering PhD program.

== Administration ==
The Director of the IBET PhD Project is Professor Tiz Mekonnen. He is an associate Professor of Chemical Engineering at the University of Waterloo and Canada Research Chair in Sustainable Multiphase Polymers. Mekonnen spearheaded the initial development of the program, along with University of Waterloo Dean of Engineering, Mary Wells. Professor Adeyemi Adesina joined the IBET PhD Project as Co-Director and works alongside Professor Mekonnen to coordinate and lead the consortium.

== Project sponsors ==
The McCall MacBain Foundation, founded by John McCall MacBain, is a supporter of the IBET PhD Project. It has made gifts that will ensure the continued success of a range of important program initiatives and will significantly contribute to the growing community of IBET Fellows.

Consulting and Engineering firm, Geosyntec Consultants, provides financial support to the IBET PhD Project and serves as a sponsor for the program's annual conference.

== External partners ==
The IBET PhD Program partners with three organizations to help enhance the doctoral experience for Fellows.

Black Engineers of Canada provides networking and mentoring opportunities at IBET PhD conferences and events in its continued efforts to promote diversity and inclusivity in the Canadian Engineering Profession.

The Vector Institute partners with the IBET PhD Project (IBET) to increase the number of Indigenous and Black professors in Engineering and Computer Science in Canada. Through the partnership, IBET Fellows gain access to Vector programming, including research talks and courses, as well as the Vector Digital Talent Hub, where they can connect with leading industry sponsors on AI-related internships and work opportunities.

Part of the Canadian Black Scientists Network's (CBSN) mission is to increase the representation of Black Canadians as STEMM (Science, Technology, Engineering, Mathematics & Medical/Health) researchers and practitioners. CBSN holds conferences such as BE-STEMM that allow Black IBET PhD Project Fellows to share their research with other Black scientists.

== Fellows ==
As of June 2026, a total of 65 IBET PhD Fellows at the 18 participating academic institutions had been supported through IBET Momentum Fellowships.

== Mentors ==
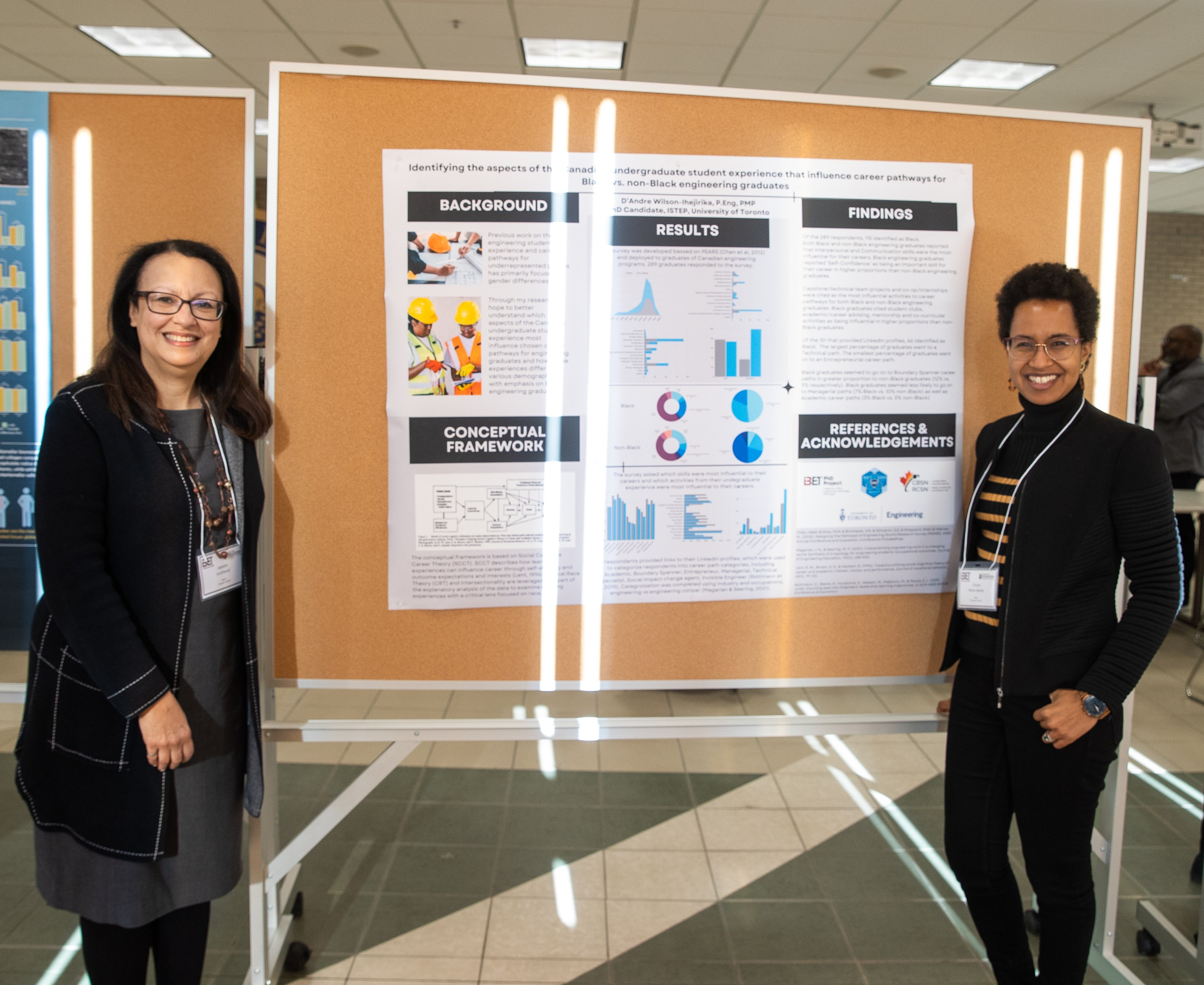
IBET PhD Project mentor Jeannette Southwood of Engineers Canada (l) with IBET PhD Project alumni D’Andre Wilson-Ihejirika (r), a graduate of University of Toronto with a PhD In Engineering Education.

Part of the IBET Momentum Fellowship is access to mentorship and community wide support. The IBET PhD Project receives mentorship support from both academia and industry partners to assist them as they aim to become professors and industry leaders. Fellows receive training and networking opportunities that will enable them to become active members of a professional community.

Mentors come from the program's participating academic institutions as well as from U.S. schools such as Cornell University. They also come from organizations such as the Vector Institute, Suncor, PWC, WSP, Geosyntec Consultants, Suncor, Dofasco, CIBC, Magna and Hydro Quebec.

Mentors have included Jeannette Southwood of Engineers Canada and Alison Boaye Belle, an assistant professor at York University's Lassonde School of Engineering.

== 2025 IBET PhD Project Conference ==
The IBET PhD Project stages an annual conference each year. Supported by The McCall MacBain Foundation and Geosyntec Consultants, the fourth annual conference was held from November 16 to 18, 2025 at Humber Polytechnic in conjunction with Engineering Deans Canada.

== Mediaplanet Canada Diversity in STEM campaign ==
The IBET PhD project was involved in Mediaplanet's Canada's 2024 Diversity in STEM campaign that was launched in the National Post and online at InnovatingCanada.ca. The campaign discussed how the IBET PhD Project is creating opportunities for Indigenous and Black PhD students and increasing representation within Canadian engineering faculties.
