= Trader Media East =

Largest classified advertising company in Central and Eastern Europe

- Predecessor: Trader Classified Media
- Parent: Schibsted
- Website: www.tmeast.com

Trader Media East is the largest classified advertising company in Central and Eastern Europe. It was established in the fourth quarter of 2005 and comprises the Russian, Baltic, CIS and Eastern European operations of Trader Classified Media.

Trader Media East became listed on the London Stock Exchange on 13 February 2006. 67.3% of the company was bought by Hurriyet, a Turkish newspaper part of the Dogan Yayin Holding, at a cost of $500m. In the event, TME relocated its head office from Paris to Istanbul. Currently, HÜRRİYET Invest B.V. (“HIBV”) owns a 97.29% share of Trader Media East Limited.

The Company employs 5000 people and focuses on the automotive, real estate and jobs sectors. In 2008, the firm produced more than 150 publications, with 5 million readers per week and hosted 22 websites, with 20 million unique monthly visitors. TME announced the appointment of its CEO Ahmet Ozer and relocation of HQ to Moscow in June 2010.

== Acquisitions ==
- In December 2006, Trader acquired posao.hr - job / recruitment site in Croatia.
- In January 2007, Trader acquired Impress Media - one of the leaders in commercial real estate advertising in the Russia.
- In June 2007, Trader acquired Moje Delo - leading job site in Slovenia.
- In June 2008, Trader acquired InfoNekretnine And Crem Magazine - real estate publisher in Croatia.
- In 2008, Trader Media East sold its subsidiary Trader com Polska to Polish media company Agora for 55 mn USD.
