= Yellow Pages Limited =

Canadian publication and internet services company

- Formerly: Tele-Direct (Publications) Inc. (1971–1999); Bell ActiMedia Inc. (1999–2002); Yellow Pages Group (2002–2010); Yellow Media (2010–2015)
- Type: Public
- Traded as: TSX: Y
- Industry: Media
- Founded: 1908; 118 years ago
- Headquarters: Montreal, Quebec, Canada
- Number of employees: 455
- Parent: Bell Canada (1908–2002); Yellow Pages Income Fund (2004–2010)
- Website: corporate.yp.ca

Yellow Pages Limited is a Canadian publication and internet services company that owns and operates Canadian properties and publications including Yellow Pages directories, YellowPages.ca, and Canada411.ca. Its online destinations reach approximately 9 million unique visitors monthly and its mobile applications for finding local citizens, downloaded more than 3 million times.

Historically known for distributing yellow pages phone books across Canada, into the 21st century YPG has primarily shifted to digital marketing services, though they also operate the YellowPages.ca local business search engine and Canada411 online phone directory, and still print phone books on a limited basis to some customers as of 2024.

== History ==
Yellow Pages Canada was established in 1908 as a division of Bell Canada. In 1971, it was incorporated as a subsidiary and renamed to Tele-Direct Inc. In 1999, the company changed its name to Bell ActiMedia Inc. to reflect a closer alliance with Bell.

In 2002, Kohlberg Kravis Roberts and the Ontario Teachers' Merchant Bank acquired control of Yellow Pages Group YPG), with Bell Canada retaining 10% ownership. In August 2003, YPG had its initial public offering, which raised over $1 billion, and established YPG as an income fund on the Toronto Stock Exchange (YLO.UN).

In October 2008, Yellow Pages was named one of "Canada's Top 100 Employers" by Mediacorp Canada Inc. and was featured in Maclean's newsmagazine, the only directory publisher to receive this honour. In 2009, Yellow Pages Group was chosen as one of Canada's Top 100 Employers, Montreal's Top Employers, and Financial Post's 2009 "Ten Best Companies to Work For".

In 2010, YPG announced that, based on urban customer habits and the decline of phone books as a result of the internet and smartphones, they would stop delivering residential phone books to customers in Toronto, Montreal, Vancouver, Calgary, Edmonton, Ottawa, Gatineau, and Quebec City, with deliveries only being resumed on request. Most customers there were urged to use the online Yellow Pages directories instead. Through 2011 and 2012, YPG lost 90% of their share value, prompting a major restructuring toward digital marketing that saw shares triple in value but also led to several layoffs. In 2015, YPG's phone book delivery cuts expanded to include Brampton, Mississauga, and Oakville, with the company continuing to analyze developing trends for potential further cuts for certain markets (namely Guelph, Kitchener, Waterloo, Cambridge, Elmira, Fergus, Hawkesbury, and Lethbridge) and locations such as high-rise buildings; however, a company statement assured YPG did not plan on fully discontinuing printed phone books, as many customers still relied on them, primarily seniors.

In March 2011, Yellow Pages sold Trader Corporation to funds advised by Apax Partners for $745 million. Its ticker symbol changed from YLO to Y in 2012.

On January 16, 2018, it was announced that Yellow Pages would cut 18% otherwise, one-fifth of its workforce. That very same day, approximately 500 employees were laid off nation-wide. According to its new CEO David Eckert, such measures were essential to ensure short-term financial health of the company, whose stock price took a significant nosedive over the year 2016–2017.

By 2018, Yellow Pages phone books were still being printed for customers in Halifax, Nova Scotia, primarily to profit from advertising, but residents who did not use them were noted to simply throw them away at the expense of the city and the environment, prompting YPG to include recycling tips in newer editions. Yellow Pages Canada still prints and publishes phone books as of 2024, but they are notably rarer and slimmer, and are largely sustained by elderly customers and advertising revenue.

== Acquisitions ==
In 2010, YPG acquired Vancouver-based Canpages for $225 million.

In 2015, YPG acquired Vancouver Magazine and Western Living magazine from TC Media.

== Controversies ==
In 2017, CBC Radio reported that small business owners were disappointed with YPG's search engine optimization services, which allegedly failed to achieve high placements on search engine results, and in some cases did not bring website traffic at all, yet still demanded large payments by locking them into contracts and threatening them with lawsuits and collection notices, which continued well into 2019 and 2021 as reported by Business in Vancouver. In 2019, Calex Legal Inc. filed a class action lawsuit in Quebec against YPG involving thousands of small businesses.

Yellow Media is considered by some Canadian financial writers to be a prime example of why investors should be skeptical of high dividend yields. In 2011, the company maintained a high dividend yield despite close scrutiny, before finally cutting dividends and taking a stock price hit.
