= Charta =

Coordinates: 7°17′N 72°58′W

- Municipality and town
- Flag
- Nickname: San Jose de Charta
- Motto: Rincón Florido de Santander
- Location of the municipality and town of Charta in the Santander Department of Colombia.
- Country: Colombia
- Department: Santander Department
- Established: December 1st, 1927

Area
  - Municipality and town: 152 km^{2} (59 sq mi)
  - Urban: 0.16 km^{2} (0.062 sq mi)
- Elevation: 2,000 m (6,600 ft)

Population (2008)
  - Municipality and town: 3,209
- Time zone: UTC-5 (Colombia Standard Time)

Charta is a town and municipality in the Santander Department in northeastern Colombia.
