= Modern Painters (magazine) =

New York-based monthly art magazine

- Categories: Contemporary art
- Frequency: Monthly
- Founder: Peter Fuller
- Founded: 1987
- First issue: Spring 1988
- Company: Louise Blouin Media
- Country: United States
- Based in: New York City
- Language: English
- ISSN: 0953-6698

Modern Painters is a monthly art magazine. It was launched as a quarterly in the United Kingdom in 1987, and is now published in New York City by Louise Blouin Media.

== History ==
The magazine was launched in England in 1987 by the art critic Peter Fuller, who was the editor until he died in a car accident in 1990. It was at first a quarterly; the first issue appeared in Spring 1988. Fuller's Associate Editor Karen Wright acquired the title from its original backers who included Bernard Jacobson of Bernard Jacobson Gallery and David Landau, founder and then editor of the scholarly journal, Print Quarterly. When the magazine was purchased by LTB Media in 2004, Wright was retained for a short period in a consultancy capacity, and its publishing operation was brought to New York City in June 2004. The first editor-in-chief under new ownership was Roger Tatley.

David Bowie joined the editorial board in 1994.

Modern Painters is owned by Louise Blouin Media. In March 2016, Scott Indrisek was named editor-in-chief of the magazine, replacing Daniel Kunitz. Later 2017, most of the staff was renewed and new writers joined the magazine. The launch of new web services such as Blouin Shop contributed to better visibility worldwide.
