= John McCall MacBain =

Canadian businessman and philanthropist

John McCall MacBain OC

20th Chancellor of McGill University
- In office July 1, 2021 – June 30, 2024
- Preceded by: Michael Meighen
- Succeeded by: Pierre Boivin

Personal details
- Born: 1958 (age 67–68)
- Education: McGill University (BA); Wadham College, Oxford (MA); Harvard University (MBA)

John H. McCall MacBain OC (born February 13, 1958) is a Canadian businessman and philanthropist who is the founder of the McCall MacBain Foundation and Pamoja Capital SA, its investment arm. Prior to establishing the McCall MacBain Foundation, in the late 1980s he bought Auto Hebdo magazine in Montréal, Canada and bought and consolidated hundreds of other existing Auto Traders and Buy and Sell classified papers and websites to form Trader Classified Media, the world's leading classified advertising company.

== Education and personal life ==
McCall MacBain received an MBA from Harvard Business School (1984), an MA in Law (Jurisprudence) from Wadham College, Oxford (1982), as a Rhodes Scholar and an Honours BA in economics from McGill University (1980). He holds honorary degrees from Dalhousie University, the University of Ottawa, Brock University, McGill University and Monash University.

He served as president of the Students' Society of McGill University, as well as valedictorian. While at Oxford, he was co-captain of the university's ice hockey team.

McCall MacBain has five children and three grandchildren. He is married to Marcy McCall MacBain, an academic at the University of Oxford in the Centre for Evidence-Based Medicine. He is also an avid skier, marathon runner, swimmer, ice hockey player and cyclist as well as a commercial land and sea pilot.

== Career ==
He worked from 1984 to 1987 as director of marketing at Power Financial Corporation.

From 1987 to 2006, McCall MacBain was the founder, President and CEO of Trader Classified Media, a classified advertising company. Starting with his purchase of three small publications in Montréal in 1987, when he was 29 years old, he developed the classified business to include 500 print titles and 57 internet sites in over 23 countries, including in Argentina, Australia, Canada, China, France, Hungary, Italy, Mexico, Spain and the United States.

After its IPO in 2000, Trader Classified Media was publicly traded on NASDAQ and the Euronext Paris Stock Exchange. In 2006, McCall MacBain sold the company and set up the McCall MacBain Foundation.

He was Chancellor of McGill University for a three-year term from 2021 to 2024, and is now Chancellor Emeritus. He is also a member of The Giving Pledge.

== Philanthropy ==
Since its formation in Geneva, Switzerland, in 2007, the McCall MacBain Foundation has made approximately $500 million of grants to fund projects relating to education and scholarships, climate change and the environment and youth mental health. On January 11, 2024, the Foundation made a gift that will ensure the continued success of the IBET PhD Project that supports junior Indigenous and Black scholars pursuing doctoral degrees in Engineering and STEM programs in Canada. In addition to his role as a director and Chair of the foundation, McCall MacBain is the Founding Chair of the European Climate Foundation, Chancellor Emeritus of McGill University, a member of the advisory board for the Yale Center for Environmental Law and Policy and a Foundation Fellow of Wadham College, Oxford. Additionally, he is a director of the Mandela Rhodes Foundation in Cape Town, South Africa.

McCall MacBain, a Canadian Rhodes Scholar (Quebec and Wadham, 1980), donated $120 million to the Rhodes Trust in order to help fund the scholarships and aid the expansion of the program to new countries. He made that gift in September 2013 during the Rhodes 110th anniversary celebrations. As a result, he was named a 'Second Century Founder of the Rhodes Scholarships' in honour of that significant gift. Additionally, McCall MacBain was honoured in 2014 as a Fellow of the Chancellor's Court of Benefactors at Oxford University and at Rhodes House, where his portrait hangs and a room bears his name. The McCall MacBain Graduate Centre at Wadham College, Oxford, was endowed by him.

McCall MacBain has also donated more than $10 million to fund McCall MacBain Loran Scholars through the Loran Scholars Foundation – the largest undergraduate entry scholarship program in Canada – and to fund the Mandela Rhodes Foundation.

On June 30, 2016, McCall MacBain was named an Officer of the Order of Canada by Governor General David Johnston for "his achievements as a business leader and for his contributions to academic institutions as a philanthropist."

On February 13, 2019, John and Marcy McCall MacBain donated $200 million to McGill University, the single-largest charitable gift in Canada at the time, for a graduate scholarship program – the McCall MacBain Scholarship at McGill – modelled on the Rhodes Scholarship.

In 2019, the McCall MacBain Foundation also seeded the Kupe Leadership Scholarship at the University of Auckland.
