= Phaidon =

Phaidon is an ancient Greek name that may refer to:

- Phaedo of Elis, philosopher
- Phaedo, one of Plato's dialogues named after Phaedo of Elis who appears in it
- Phaidon Press, a publisher
- Phaidon Design Classics, a 2006 British three volume set of reference books on industrial design

== See also ==
- Pheidon, king of Argos
