= David Ohle =

American novelist

- Education: Louisiana State University University of Kansas
- Writing career
- Genres: Dystopia, satire
- Notable work: Motorman (1972)
- Literary movement: Experimental literature, Surrealism, Absurdist fiction

David Ohle is an American writer, novelist, and a lecturer at the University of Kansas, Lawrence. After receiving his M.A. from KU, he taught at the University of Texas at Austin from 1975 to 1984. In 2002, he began teaching fiction writing and screenwriting as a part-time lecturer at the University of Kansas. His short fiction has appeared in Esquire, the Transatlantic Review, Paris Review, and Harper's, among other magazines.

While it remained out of print for over thirty years, his first novel Motorman (initially published in 1972) gathered a quiet cult following, was circulated through photocopies, and went on to become an influence to a generation of American writers such as Shelley Jackson and Ben Marcus.

His subsequent novels The Age of Sinatra (2004), The Pisstown Chaos (2008), The Old Reactor (2013) and The Blast (2014) take place in the same dystopian setting as Motorman. Ohle's fiction is often described as weird, surreal and experimental. His own influences include Leonora Carrington, Philip K. Dick, Flann O'Brien, and Raymond Roussel.

== Works ==
=== Fiction ===
- Motorman (1972, re-issued by 3rd bed/Calamari Press in 2004)
- The Age of Sinatra (2004)
- The Pisstown Chaos (2008)
- Boons & The Camp (2009, Calamari Press)
- The Devil in Kansas (2012)
- The Old Reactor (2013)
- The Blast (2014, Calamari Press)
- The Death of a Character (2021)

=== Non-fiction ===
- "The City Moon" (a faux-newspaper he published with Roger Martin from 1973-1985)
- Cows are Freaky when they Look at You: An Oral History of the Kaw Valley Hemp Pickers (1991)
- Cursed from Birth: The Short, Unhappy Life of William S. Burroughs, Jr. (2006)
