= Art+Auction =

- Editor in Chief: Eric Bryan
- Categories: Art
- Frequency: Monthly
- Circulation: US, Canada, international
- Publisher: Louise Blouin Media
- Founded: 1979
- Country: United States
- Based in: New York City
- Language: English
- Website: www.blouinartinfo.com (archived copy)
- ISSN: 0197-1093

Art+Auction is a monthly art magazine published in New York City by Louise Blouin Media. It was started in 1979, and has a circulation of about 20,000 copies.
