= List of art magazines =

An art magazine is a publication that focuses on the topic of art. They can be in printed form, found online or both and can be aimed at different audiences which includes galleries, art buyers, amateur or professional artists and the general public. Art magazines can be either trade or consumer magazines or both.

Notable art magazines include:

== 0–9 ==
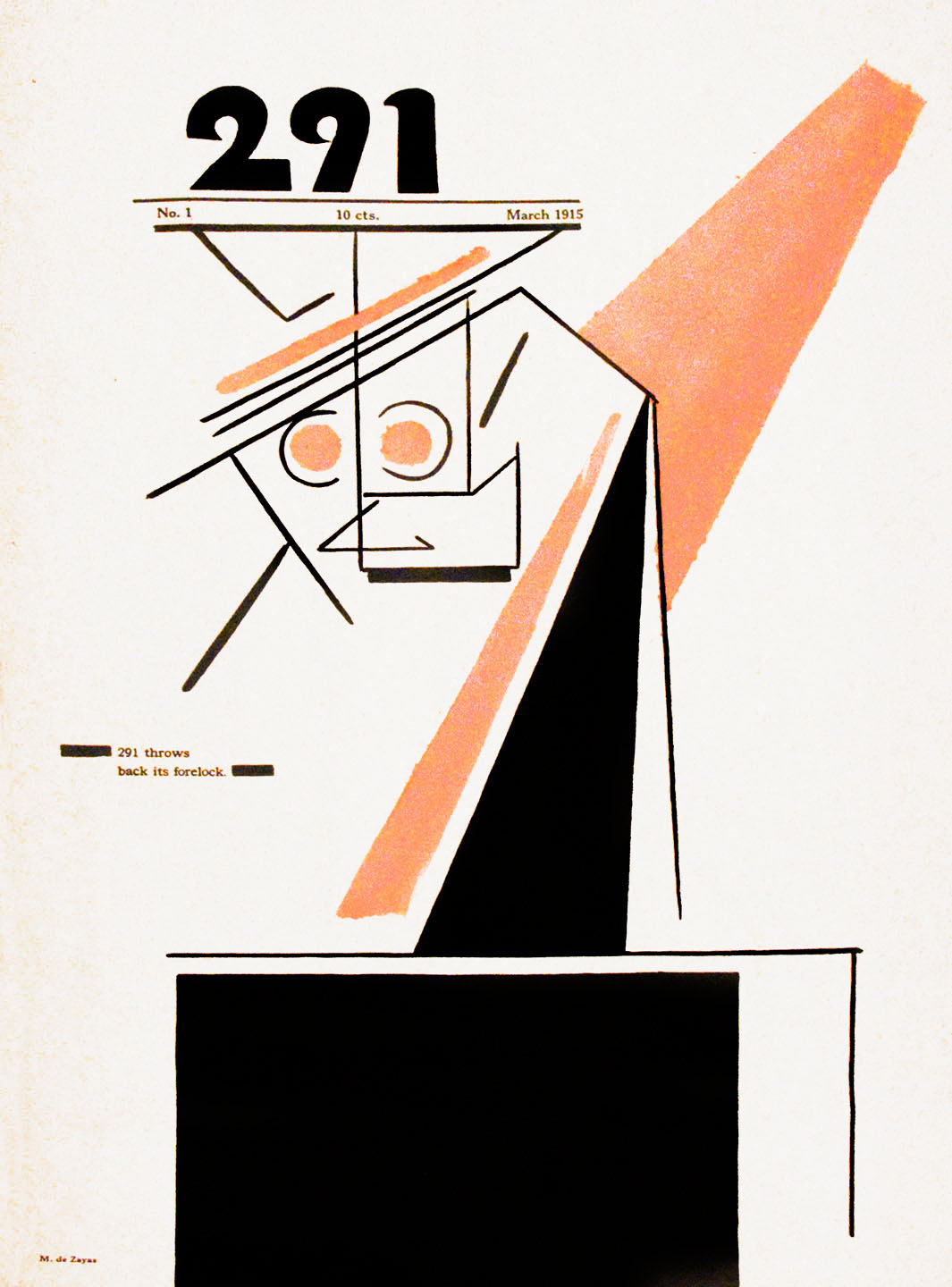
291

- 20x20 magazine, arts and literature publication, founded in 2008 in London
- 291, 1915–1916, New York City

== A ==
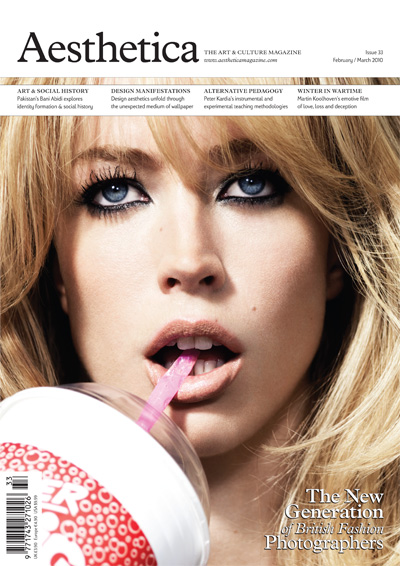
Aesthetica cover, February/March 2010

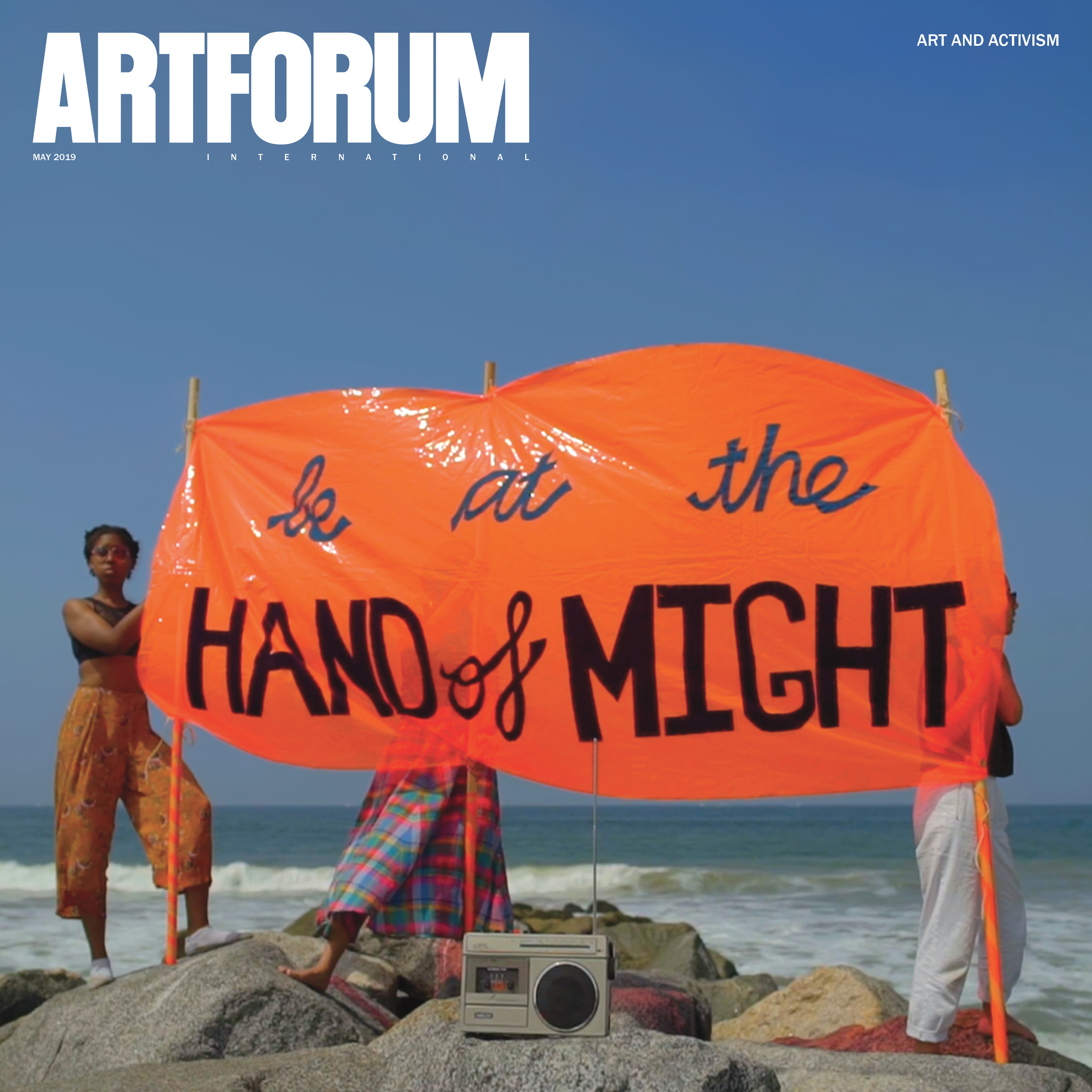
Artforum cover, May 2019

- Aesthetica, est. 2002, United Kingdom
- Afterall, est. 1998/9, London, United Kingdom
- Afterimage, est. 1972, bimonthly journal of media arts and cultural criticism published by the Visual Studies Workshop
- The Aldine, 1869–1879, American art monthly
- American Art Review, est. 1972, American colonial era until the early 1970s
- Aperture, est. 1952, quarterly photography magazine; based in New York City
- Apollo, est. 1925, monthly, based in London, United Kingdom
- ARC Magazine, est. 2011, contemporary Caribbean art and culture
- Art almanac: the essential guide to Australia's galleries, monthly guide to galleries, news and awards in Australia, est. 1974
- Art and Antiques, est. 1984, published out of North Carolina, US
- Art and Architecture Journal, est. 1980, re-launched 2005; UK based
- Art+Auction, owned by Louise Blouin Media
- Art & Australia, biannual print magazine, the country's longest-running art journal, in print since 1963
- Art & Project, Dutch art magazine, 1968–1989
- ArtAsiaPacific, English-language periodical covering contemporary art and culture in Asia, the Pacific, and the Middle East, published and distributed internationally six times a year
- Art in America, est. 1913, covers US and international art but concentrated on New York City
- Art in Australia, Australian magazine that was published 1916–1942
- Art in Print, est. 2011, bimonthly art magazine and website on the history and culture of artists' prints
- Art International, 1956–1984, published quarterly in Paris, France
- The Art Journal, 1839–1912, London-based monthly journal
- Art Monthly, est. 1976, UK-based coverage of contemporary art
- Art Monthly Australasia, visual arts magazine published since 1987
- The Art Newspaper, est. 1983, international coverage of news from the world of visual arts
- Art on Paper, 1996–2009, based in New York City
- ART PAPERS, based in Atlanta, Georgia, bimonthly contemporary art magazine
- Art Plus Magazine, formerly Contemporary Art Philippines, bi-monthly magazine covering Philippine visual arts
- Art Press, est. 1972, based in Paris, monthly bilingual (French/English) contemporary art magazine
- Art Press 2, est. 2006, based in Paris, quarterly contemporary art magazine
- ArtAsiaPacific, covers contemporary art in Asia, the Pacific, and the Middle East
- Arte Al Limite, est. 2002 in Santiago, bimonthly contemporary art magazine
- Artforum, est. 1962 in San Francisco, now based in New York City
- Artibus Asiae, est. 1925 in Dresden, biannual academic journal specialising in the arts and archaeology of Asia
- Artibus et Historiae, semi-annual journal of art historical research, published by the Institute for Art Historical Research
- Artillery, based in Los Angeles, covers US and international art but concentrated on California
- ARTINFO, owned by Louise Blouin Media
- Artist Profile, est. 2007, Sydney, Australia, contemporary art quarterly covering Asia-Pacific
- Artlink, founded in 1981, based in Australia, covers contemporary art of Australia and Asia-Pacific
- Artlog, based in Brooklyn, New York, online only
- Artnet, based in New York City, Berlin and Paris
- ARTnews, est. 1902, quarterly visual arts magazine covering ancient to contemporary art, based in New York City, NY, USA
- ArtNexus, leading Latin American contemporary art magazine, est. 1976, based in Bogota and North Miami
- ArtReview, est. 1949, international contemporary art magazine, based in London
- Artribune, est. 2011, bi-monthly Italian art magazine, based in Rome
- Arts of Asia, est. 1970, quarterly international magazine of Asian arts and antiques
- Arts Magazine, 1926–1992, monthly journal published by Art Digest, Co., New York City
- Asahi Camera, monthly photographic magazine, published in Japan by Asahi Shinbun-sha, publisher of the newspaper The Asahi Shimbun 1926–2020
- Asia Art Archive, collection of material on the recent history of art from Asia
- Atlantica Revista de Arte y Pensamiento, Centro Atlántico de Arte de Moderno (CAAM), based in Las Palmas de Gran Canaria, since 1990
- Australian Art Collector, est. 1997, quarterly magazine covering Australian contemporary art, including aboriginal art
- Australian Art Review, Australian quarterly fine arts magazine

== B ==
- BAK magazine, bilingual Turkish and English visual arts magazine
- Balam, Latin American photography magazine based in Buenos Aires, Argentina
- The Bear Deluxe, Portland, Oregon–based magazine dedicated to environmental writing, literature, and visual art
- Beautiful/Decay, began as a 'zine, currently a blog
- Beaux Arts Magazine, French magazine
- Bedeutung, quarterly British publication of philosophy, current affairs, art and literature
- Bidoun, magazine about arts and culture of the Middle East
- The Blue Review, 1911–1913, London-based arts magazine
- Blueprint, London-based magazine of architecture and design
- BOMB Magazine, quarterly magazine edited by artists and writers, based in New York City, est. 1981
- Border Crossings, quarterly arts and culture magazine edited and published in Winnipeg, Canada, est. 1982
- The Brooklyn Rail, journal of arts, culture, and politics published monthly in Brooklyn, est. 2000
- Buddhiprakash, est. 1850, based in Gujarat, India, oldest Gujarati language magazine
- The Burlington Magazine, est. 1903, based in London, England, longest running English-language art journal

== C ==
- Cabinet, est. 2000 in Brooklyn, New York
- The Calvert Journal, digital magazine of contemporary New East culture, including art, film, architecture, design and avant-garde culture
- Camera, quality international gravure-printed art photography magazine published 1922–1981 in Switzerland
- Camera Craft, 1900–1942, est. by Photographers' Association of California, absorbed by American Photography
- Communication Arts, est. 1959 in Menlo Park, California
- Connaissance des Arts, French magazine
- Constance, est. 2006, based in New Orleans, Louisiana
- Contemporary, 1993–2008, monthly visual arts magazine based in London
- The Crayon, defunct US art magazine (1855–1861)
- Creative Boom, 2009, digital magazine
- Culture Lounge, bi-monthly magazine, based in Columbus, Nebraska, founded in 2006

== D ==
- Darling, independent, ad-free, women's magazine with a "no-retouching" policy, based in Los Angeles, founded in 2009
- Daruma Magazine, Japanese art magazine, 1994–2011
- Derrière le miroir (DLM), French art magazine published 1946–1982, Paris
- Dialogue, 1978–2002, based in Ohio
- The Drama, 2000–2007

== E ==
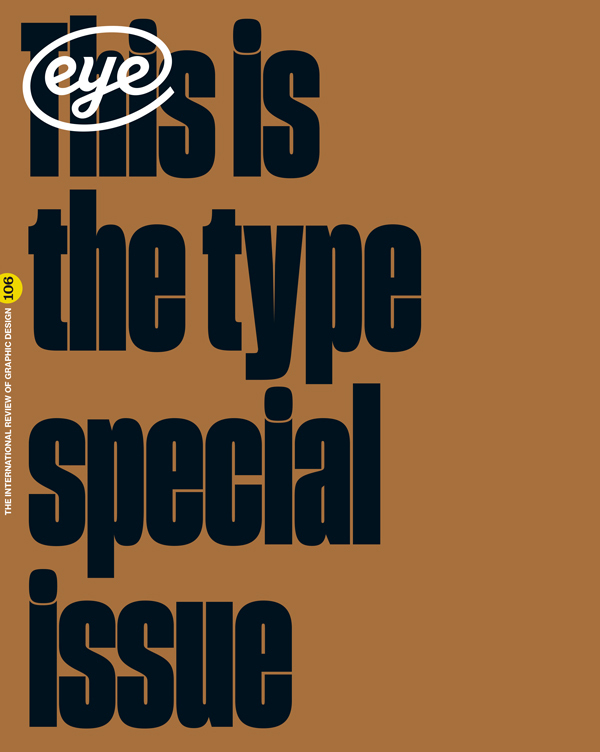
Eye cover, Summer 2024

- East of Borneo, online contemporary art magazine based in Los Angeles, founded in 2010
- Esopus, semi-annual magazine, based in New York City, founded in 2003
- esse arts + opinions, Montreal-based contemporary art magazine, published three times a year
- European Photography, bilingual art photography magazine
- Eye, quarterly magazine about graphic design and visual culture, based in London, founded in 1990

== F ==
- Fillip, contemporary art magazine, based in Vancouver, Canada, founded in 2004
- First American Art Magazine, quarterly magazine about indigenous art of the Americas, founded in 2013
- Flash Art, bimonthly contemporary art magazine, based in Milan, Italy
- France-Amérique, 1943 bilingual cultural magazine
- frieze, London-based contemporary art magazine, founded 1991, published eight times a year
- FRONTRUNNER, online magazine of contemporary art, based in Brooklyn, founded 2009

== G ==
- Geometricae, geometric abstract art magazine, based in Valencia, Spain, founded in 2015

== H ==
- High Performance Magazine, quarterly performance art and experimental art magazine 1978–1997
- Hunter and Cook, contemporary Canadian arts and culture magazine, 2008–2011
- Hyperallergic, online magazine of contemporary art criticism, based in Brooklyn, founded 2009

== I ==
- ImagineFX , magazine of digital art, est. 2006, based in Bath, UK
- Die Insel, 1899–1901, Munich, Germany
- It is. A Magazine for Abstract Art, NYC-based limited edition fine arts magazine helped create and define abstract expressionism, 1958–1965

== J ==
- The Jackdaw, British arts magazine, founded 2000
- Juxtapoz, monthly lowbrow art magazine, founded 1994

== K ==
- KIOSK, art, design and architecture magazine, est. 2007, based in London, UK

== L ==
- LensCulture, international art of photography, est. 2004
- Light Vision, Australia's international photography magazine, 1977–78, bi-monthly Australian photography magazine
- Lodown magazine, bimonthly art, culture and lifestyle magazine featuring sculpture, photography, and graffiti
- Look, published by the Art Gallery Society of New South Wales, Australia

== M ==
- Magazine of Art, 1878–1904, London- and New York City–based monthly visual arts magazine
- Marg, quarterly Indian art magazine and a publisher of books on the arts, based in Mumbai
- Mavo, Japanese dadaist art magazine, edited by Tatsuo Okada and Tomoyoshi Murayama, published 1924–1925
- Metronome, founded in the 1996 by the Metronome Press in Paris, France
- Minotaure, 1933–1939, Surrealist-oriented; founded by Albert Skira in Paris, France
- Mir iskusstva, est. 1899 in St. Petersburg, Russia
- Modern Painters, founded 1987, owned by Louise Blouin Media
- Mono.Kultur, est. 2005 in Berlin, Germany
- Monopol Magazin, monthly German magazine about contemporary art
- Moving Art Magazine, international art magazine, est. 2007, based in the Netherlands

== N ==
- Neural magazine, est. 1993, based in Bari, Italy, quarterly magazine about digital culture and media arts
- New Art Examiner, 1973–2002, based in Chicago, US
- The New&Bad, based in Tel Aviv, Israel, founded as a part of Maayan poetry magazine
- The New Criterion, New York–based review of the arts and intellectual life
- Nictoglobe, founded in 1982, online only
- n.paradoxa, est. 1996, covering feminist art criticism and the work of contemporary women artists

== P ==
- Parkett, from Zurich, Switzerland
- The Pastel Journal
- Pelican Bomb, online art review on contemporary visual arts in New Orleans, 2011–2018
- Photofile, photography journal published since 1983 by the Australian Centre for Photography
- Photosho, showcasing Canadian photographers, defunct
- Plazm, founded 1991
- The Portfolio, 1870–1893
- Portfolio Magazine, 1979–1983
- Print Connoisseur, 1920–1932, New York City–based quarterly magazine
- Print Quarterly, quarterly magazine and a scholarly journal on prints based in London, founded in 1984 by David Landau
- Professional Artist, the American art industry's foremost business magazine for visual artists, est. 1986
- Public Delivery, founded 2011

== Q ==
- Quilter's Newsletter, US-based quilting magazine

== R ==
- Raw Vision, UK-based, devoted to outsider art
- Reorient, Canada-based, covering contemporary Middle Eastern arts and culture
- Revue Noire, Paris, 1991–2001

== S ==
- Sculpture, published by the International Sculpture Center
- Sensitive Skin Magazine, online magazine of the arts
- Southwest Art, in print and online, magazine specializing in art of the American Southwest
- Spike Art Quarterly, in print and online, published in Vienna
- Studio International, art and design magazine founded in 1893 under the name The Studio: An Illustrated Magazine of Fine and Applied Art, in print 1963–1994, presently online only

== T ==
- Tate Etc., art magazine published by the Tate, London, previously published under various names
- Texte zur Kunst, German contemporary art magazine
- Third Text, founded by Rasheed Araeen, London
- Toby Room, founded by Jared Pappas-Kelley and Michael Lent in 2001, United States
- Toons Mag, cartoon magazine based in Norway, est. 2009
- TradeArt, defunct
- Triple Canopy
- Two Coats of Paint, founded by Sharon Butler in 2007

== W ==
- Wallpaper*
- Watercolor Artist
- White Fungus
- Whitehot

== X ==
- X, London, 1959–1962
- X-TRA Contemporary Art Quarterly, Los Angeles–based quarterly magazine with a focus on contemporary art criticism, founded in 1997

== Y ==
- The Yankee, 1828–1829, founded by first American art critic John Neal

== Z ==
- Zingmagazine

== See also ==
- List of art reference books
