= Yanase =

Yanase may refer to:

- Yanase (surname), a Japanese surname
- Yanase (car dealership), a Japanese dealership retailer of imported United States and European vehicles to Japan
- Yanase Station, a railway station in Asago, Hyōgo Prefecture, Japan
- 46643 Yanase, a main-belt asteroid
