= Takamizawa Michinao =

Japanese avant garde artist

- Michinao Takamizawa
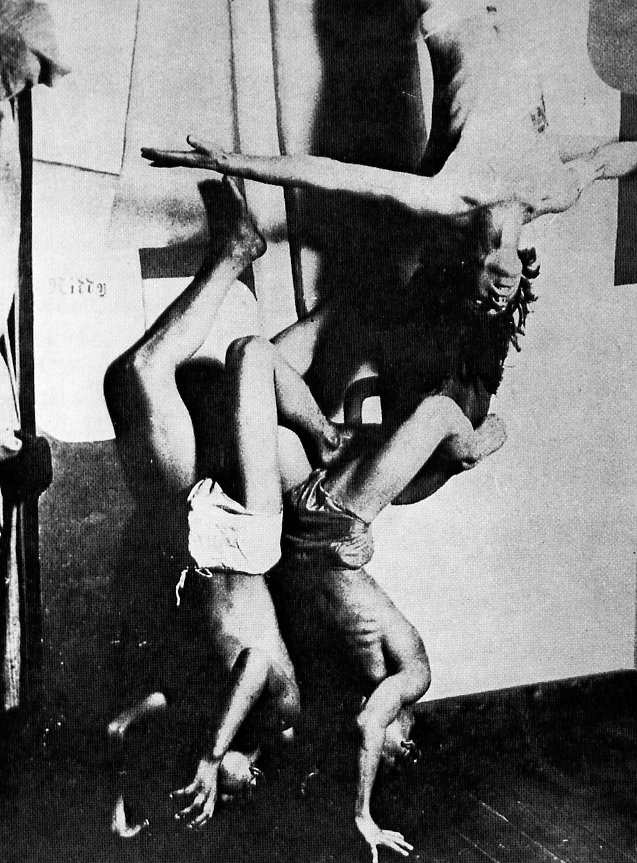
- Iwane Sumitani, Tatsuo Okada and Michinao Takamizawa, performing in Dance
- Born: 10 February 1899
- Died: 12 December 1989 (aged 90)
- Notable work: performance art, collage
- Style: Dada
- Movement: Mavo

Takamizawa Michinao also known as Michinao Takamizawa, also known as Tagawa Suihō (10 February 1899 – 12 December 1989), was an early twentieth century Japanese dadaist artist.

== Work ==
Takamizawa worked in performance, collage, painting and screen printing. He would often collage three-dimensional objects onto two dimensional artworks, for example, Portrait of a Foreigner’s Mistress (1924), which incorporated strands of hair and firecracker packets. The collage was used as the cover of the September, 1924 issue of Mavo Magazine, which had actual firecracker packets attached. The text inside the magazine described the journal itself as explosive, stating "We are the basic preparation for the eternal revenge of the proletariat against the bourgeoisie, and we are pushy but frank destroyers." The magazine was censored after its release for potential public danger.

== Mavo ==
He was a member of the Japanese avant garde collective, Mavo. In addition to his work with that group, he is known for throwing rocks through the glass ceiling of a building in Japan housing an exhibition of art by Nika-kai (The Second Society) to protest the conservative government Bunten (Ministry of Education Exhibition), and its associated art jury members. Michinao and the Mavo group of artists had been rejected for the exhibition by the jury.

== Collections ==
His work is held in the collection of the Kyoto National Museum of Art permanent collection, and in the collection of the Museum of Fine Arts, Boston.
