= Delia Austrian =

American journalist

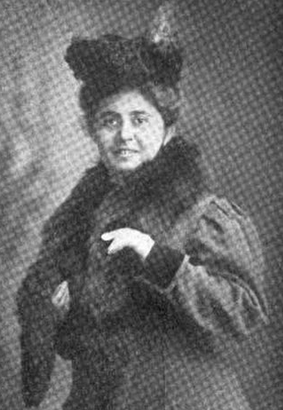
- Delia Austrian, from a 1910 publication.
- Born: September 18, 1874; Cleveland, Ohio
- Died: November 26, 1928 (aged 54); Manhattan, New York
- Education: University of Chicago, B.Ph. (1898); Columbia University, M.S. (1923)
- Known for: Delia Austrian Medal
- Parent(s): Solomon Austrian; Julia Rebecca Mann

Delia Austrian (September 18, 1874 – October 26, 1928) was an American journalist. The Delia Austrian Medal is awarded each year by the Drama League of New York in her honor.

== Biography ==
She was born on September 18, 1874, in Cleveland, Ohio to Solomon Austrian and Julia Rebecca Mann (1848–1933). Her father was a Harvard University graduate and a lawyer. She had a twin sister, Celia Austrian (1874–1900) who died in Chicago, Illinois and two brothers, Alfred S. Austrian (1870–1932) and Harvey E. Austrian (1879–?). Delia wrote: "I was born into a good, middle-class family and had a happy childhood in Cleveland, . . . but later moved to Chicago, where my girlhood was spent."

In 1898 Delia graduated from the University of Chicago with a Bachelor of Philosophy degree. After her graduation she worked on the editorial staff of the Chicago Tribune. She received a master's degree from Columbia University in 1923.

Delia died on October 26, 1928, in Manhattan.

== Legacy ==
Her papers were archived at the University of Chicago. The Delia Austrian Medal is awarded each year by the Drama League of New York for the most distinguished performance of the theater season.

== Bibliography ==
- The American woman in art (1901)
- Love Songs (1902)
- Correspondences with Theodore Dreiser (1906)
- Ways of War and Peace (1914)
- Juliette Recamier by Delia Austrian (1922)
- The Feminist Movement in Modern Drama (1924)
