= Gennifer =

Gennifer is a given name. Notable people with the given name include:

- Gennifer Brandon (born 1990), American basketball player
- Gennifer Choldenko (born 1957), American writer
- Gennifer Flowers (born 1950), American model
- Gennifer Hutchison (born 1977), American television writer
- Gennifer Weisenfeld, American art historian and professor

== See also ==
- Jennifer (given name)
