= Virginia Schenck =

American singer (born 1960)

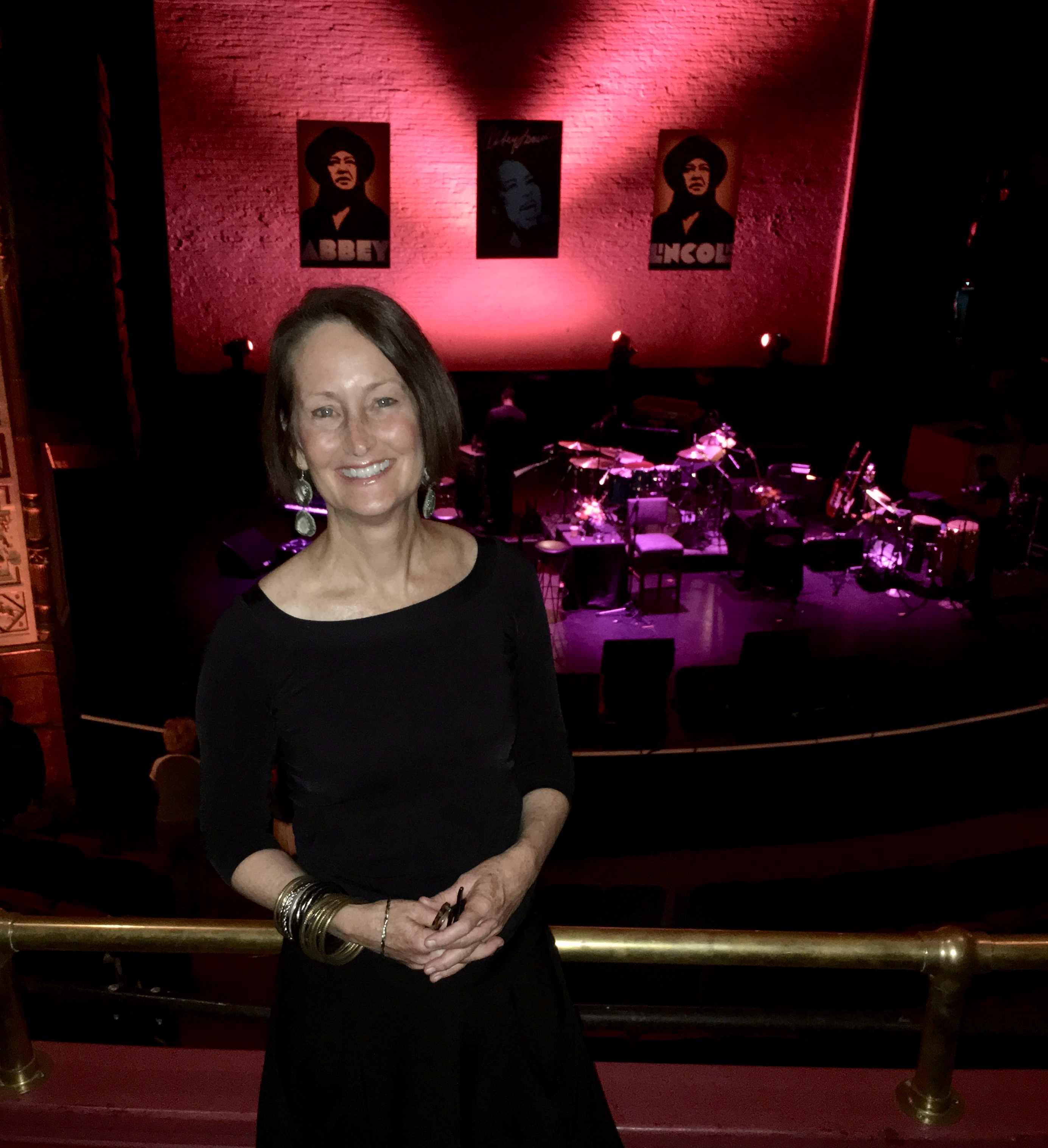

Background information
- Born: March 21, 1960 (age 66); Winter Park, Florida, U.S.
- Genres: Jazz, vocal improvisation, circlesinging
- Occupations: vocal artist, composer, arranger, producer
- Instrument: Vocals
- Website: virginiaschenck.com

Virginia Schenck (born March 21, 1960) is an American jazz vocalist. She has released four albums incorporating jazz classics and ballads along with her own compositions.

== Early life and education ==
Born into a musical family in Winter Park, Florida, Schenck is the youngest of four children. Her paternal grandfather was a composer and producer in musical theatre, while her maternal grandfather was an amateur bluegrass musician.

Schenck attended Florida State University and received a Bachelor of Music in Music Therapy in 1983. She completed an internship in Music Therapy at Highland Hospital in Asheville, North Carolina.

== Career ==
Schenck also studied classical and jazz piano, voice, and dance and began singing in jazz groups. She launched her professional music therapy career in Macon, GA, at Charter Lake Hospital in 1983. While working in Macon, she met drummer Jaimoe Johnson of the renowned Allman Brothers Band. She made some of her first professional appearances with a jazz ensemble featuring Jaimoe as drummer.

Schenck moved to Atlanta in 1985 and married William A. Berry, Atlanta Journal-Constitution staff photographer in 1986 and divorced in 2009. Their daughter Alice Page Berry was born in 1991. In Atlanta, she continued to weave together dual careers in jazz and music therapy.

Using the stage name VA, she became active on the Atlanta jazz scene and eventually put together her own band featuring Kevin Bales, piano; Rodney Jordan, bass; and Marlon Patton, drums.

Schenck studied and performed with legendary vocalist, improvisor, and conductor Bobby McFerrin.

She has drawn inspiration from McFerrin's CircleSinging, a technique creating spontaneous, improvised compositions in a choral style. Through CircleSinging, Schenck met Rhiannon, the innovative jazz singer. Schenck studied extensively with Rhiannon, completing her All The Way In program in 2009.

Schenck occasionally leads musical retreats and pilgrimages. In 2012 she created The Singing Journey Retreat, dedicated to exploring the voice as a spiritual tool capable of establishing deep body/mind/self connection. Retreats have been held in South Carolina where the rich Gullah heritage of the Carolina coast is honored.

Schenck receives global airplay and performs regularly in Atlanta's top jazz clubs and music venues.

Schenck's recent appearances also include: The Drama League in New York City and ACT Theatre in Seattle and the Cape May Theater in Cape May, New Jersey in The Gift, a play with totally improvised music; with aerial dancers at The Robert Mondavi Center/UC-Davis, CA; Chartres Cathedral in France; St Patricks Cathedral in Dublin, Ireland, the Kripalu Yoga and Retreat Center, Stockbridge, Massachusetts; and private concerts in Rome, Italy.

== Discography ==
- VA (2012)
- Interior Notions (2015)
- Aminata Moseka: An Abbey Lincoln Tribute (2017)
- Battle Cry (2020)
