= Look magazine =

Look magazine can refer to:

- Look (American magazine), 1937 to 1971
- Look (UK magazine)
- Look (Australian magazine)
