= Drama League Award for Distinguished Performance =

Annual American theater award

- Awarded for: Distinguished Performance
- Location: New York City
- Country: United States
- Presented by: Drama League
- First award: 1935
- Currently held by: Joshua Henry, Ragtime (2026)
- Website: dramaleague.org

The Drama League Award for Distinguished Performance, originally known as the Delia Austrian Medal, is a theater award presented annually since 1935 by The Drama League for the "most distinguished" performance of the theater season. An artist may only win the award once in their lifetime.

== Winners ==
=== 1930s ===
Year	Recipient	Work	Ref
1935	Katherine Cornell	Romeo and Juliet	
1936	Helen Hayes	Victoria Regina	
1937	Maurice Evans	King Richard II	
1938	Cedric Hardwicke	Shadow and Substance	
1939	Raymond Massey	Abe Lincoln in Illinois	

=== 1940s ===
Year	Recipient	Work	Ref
1940	Paul Muni	Key Largo	
1941	Paul Lukas	Watch on the Rhine	
1942	Judith Evelyn	Angel Street	
1943	Alfred Lunt; Lynn Fontanne	The Pirate	
1944	Elisabeth Bergner (Note: The Drama League website does not list Bergner as the recipient in 1944, instead listing Lynn Fontanne, who is listed in other sources as co-recipient with Alfred Lunt in 1943.)	The Two Mrs. Carrolls	
1945	Mady Christians	I Remember Mama	
1946	Louis Calhern	The Magnificent Yankee	
1947	Ingrid Bergman	Joan of Lorraine	
1948	Judith Anderson	Medea	
1949	Robert Morley	Edward, My Son	

=== 1950s ===
Year	Recipient	Work	Ref
1950	Grace George	The Velvet Glove	
1951	Claude Rains	Darkness at Noon	
1952	Julie Harris	I Am a Camera	
1953	Shirley Booth	The Time of the Cuckoo	
1954	Josephine Hull	The Solid Gold Cadillac	
1955	Viveca Lindfors	Anastasia	
1956	David Wayne	The Ponder Heart	
1957	Eli Wallach	Major Barbara	
1958	Ralph Bellamy	Sunrise at Campobello	
1959	Cyril Ritchard	The Pleasure of His Company	

=== 1960s ===
Year	Recipient	Work	Ref
1960	Jessica Tandy	Five Finger Exercise	
1961	Hume Cronyn	Big Fish, Little Fish	
1962	Paul Scofield	A Man for All Seasons	
1963	Charles Boyer	Lord Pengo	
1964	Alec Guinness	Dylan	
1965	John Gielgud	Tiny Alice	
1966	Richard Kiley	Man of La Mancha	
1967	Rosemary Harris	The Wild Duck	
1968	Zoe Caldwell	The Prime of Miss Jean Brodie	
1969	Alec McCowen	Hadrian the Seventh	

=== 1970s ===
Year	Recipient	Work	Ref
1970	James Stewart	Harvey	
1971	Anthony Quayle	Sleuth	
1972	Eileen Atkins; Claire Bloom	Vivat! Vivat Regina!	
1973	Alan Bates	Butley	
1974	Christopher Plummer	The Good Doctor	
1975	John Wood	Sherlock Holmes	
1976	Eva Le Gallienne	The Royal Family	
1977	Tom Courtenay	Otherwise Engaged	
1978	Frank Langella	Dracula	
1979	Frances Sternhagen	On Golden Pond	

=== 1980s ===
Year	Recipient	Work	Ref
1980	Roy Scheider	Betrayal	
1981	Ian McKellen	Amadeus	
1982	Milo O'Shea	Mass Appeal	
1983	Kate Nelligan; Edward Herrmann	Plenty	
1984	Jeremy Irons	The Real Thing	
1985	Derek Jacobi	Cyrano de Bergerac and Much Ado About Nothing	
1986	Bernadette Peters	Song and Dance	
1987	James Earl Jones	Fences	
1988	John Lithgow	M. Butterfly	
1989	Pauline Collins	Shirley Valentine	

=== 1990s ===
Year	Recipient	Work	Ref
1990	Robert Morse	Tru	
1991	Stockard Channing	Six Degrees of Separation	
1992	Glenn Close	Death and the Maiden	
1993	Stephen Rea	Someone Who'll Watch Over Me	
1994	Sam Waterston	Abe Lincoln in Illinois	
1995	Cherry Jones	The Heiress	
1996	Uta Hagen	Mrs. Klein	
1997	Charles Durning; Bebe Neuwirth	The Gin Game; Chicago	
1998	Brian Stokes Mitchell	Ragtime	
1999	Kathleen Chalfant	Wit	

=== 2000s ===
Year	Recipient	Work	Ref
2000	Eileen Heckart	The Waverly Gallery	
2001	Mary-Louise Parker; Gary Sinise	Proof; One Flew Over the Cuckoo's Nest	
2002	Liam Neeson	The Crucible	
2003	Harvey Fierstein	Hairspray	
2004	Hugh Jackman	The Boy from Oz	
2005	Norbert Leo Butz	Dirty Rotten Scoundrels	
2006	Christine Ebersole	Grey Gardens	
2007	Liev Schreiber	Talk Radio and Macbeth	
2008	Patti LuPone	Gypsy	
2009	Geoffrey Rush	Exit the King	

=== 2010s ===
Year	Recipient	Work	Ref
2010	Alfred Molina	Red	
2011	Mark Rylance	Jerusalem and La Bête	
2012	Audra McDonald	Porgy and Bess	
2013	Nathan Lane	The Nance	
2014	Neil Patrick Harris	Hedwig and the Angry Inch	
2015	Chita Rivera	The Visit	
2016	Lin-Manuel Miranda	Hamilton	
2017	Ben Platt	Dear Evan Hansen	
2018	Glenda Jackson	Three Tall Women	
2019	Bryan Cranston	Network	

=== 2020s ===
Year	Recipient	Work	Ref
2020	Danny Burstein	Moulin Rouge!	
2021	No award given due to the COVID-19 pandemic		
2022	Sutton Foster	The Music Man	
2023	Annaleigh Ashford	Sweeney Todd: The Demon Barber of Fleet Street	
2024	Sarah Paulson	Appropriate	
2025	Nicole Scherzinger	Sunset Boulevard	
2026	Joshua Henry	Ragtime	
