= Mark Burrier =

American cartoonist and illustrator

Mark Burrier (born 6 May 1979) is an American cartoonist and illustrator.

== Career ==
Burrier's style involves a fluid brush line and limited uses of color and texture. His works have been shown in galleries in New York City, Los Angeles, Tokyo, France, and Denmark. Burrier is also a skateboarder and has had his artwork appear on skateboards and apparel for Coda Skateboards. He has been independently self-publishing and distributing his comics for more than 10 years. His work has also been published internationally where it has appeared in various anthologies. SInce 2009, Burrier has been creating illustrations for Rare Words, which is one of his personal drawing blogs. Readers are able to submit words that later become works of art by Burrier. This has turned into a public sketchbook for Burrier.

== Personal information ==
When Burrier was younger, he was heavily influenced by the independent music scene in the '80s and '90s. This is what inspired his artwork. Burrier and his wife currently live in Frederick, Maryland.

== Appearances ==
Burrier's comics have been published internationally and have appeared in North American anthologies and magazines such as Kramers Ergot, The Drama, Studygroup12, and EXPO. Mark's illustrations have been shown in galleries in New York City, Los Angeles, Tokyo and Seattle. His comics and illustrations have received awards from Communication Arts, Print, American Illustration, HOW Magazine, STEP Inside Design and the American Advertising Federation.

== Awards ==
Burrier has received a number of awards for his works. He has received rewards from the following:

- 2007 Ignatz Award and was named “Best Comic Book” by the Baltimore City Paper
- Society of Illustrators
- Communication Arts
- Print
- American Illustration
- 3×3 Magazine
- HOW Magazine
- STEP Inside Design
- American Advertising Federation

== Clients ==
- National Geographic
- The Washington Post
- Bell Sports
