= Bryan Holme =

American author and publisher

Bryan Holme (1913–1990) was an American author and publisher who founded Studio Books, a subsidiary of Viking Press. He also published The Studio, a London-based art magazine.

In August 1990, he died at the age of 78 due to kidney failure.

== Early life and career ==
Born in the United Kingdom, he moved to the United States in 1929. Later, he founded Studio Publications.

== Bibliography ==
- The Kennedy Years (1963)
- The World in Vogue (1963)
- Georgia O'Keeffe (1976)
- Advertising: Reflections of a century (1982, Heinemann)
- Princely Feasts and Festivals (1988, Thames & Hudson)
- A Clowder of Cats (1989, Herbert Press)
