= Florian K. Lawton =

American painter

- Born: June 20, 1921; Cleveland, Ohio
- Died: January 11, 2011 (aged 89); Aurora, Ohio
- Education: Cleveland College, John Huntington Polytechnic, Cleveland Institute of Art
- Occupations: Artist, educator
- Known for: Painting
- Notable work: American Pastime, The White House, Washington DC

Florian Kenneth Lawton (lǎw-tŏn; June 21, 1921 – January 11, 2011) was an American visual artist and a realist painter who worked primarily in a regional style.

Lawton's subjects encompass rural landscapes including lakes, as well as hunting and fishing narratives reflecting his personal interests. Along with his interest in nature, his works reflect his friendships within the Amish community. He created many narrative paintings and drawings that capture the Amish at work and play in Ohio, Pennsylvania and Indiana.

== History ==
=== Childhood and youth ===
Lawton was the seventh of nine children (born Florian K. Lawicki) raised in Garfield Heights, Ohio. His parents were Maximillian and Mary Kotlarek Lawicki. Max owned a butcher shop and was a hard working and caring father. Lawton's talent for drawing was recognized at an early age. Walks in the metropolitan parks at a young age fostered his fondness, and deep appreciation of nature and the changing seasons, so dramatic in the Great Lakes region of the United States.

In junior and senior high school he designed sets for plays and other performances under the guidance of Francis Schwartz, his first art teacher. He graduated from Garfield Heights High School. Attending Cleveland College for two years, he took life drawing, illustration and painting classes. Moving on to further his art education, he attended John Huntington Polytechnic School, where he developed his drawing and illustration skills. He was most inspired by the illustrations he had seen in Scribner's Magazine and The Saturday Evening Post by Norman Rockwell and Frederic Remington.

In 1943, during World War II, Lawton and his four brothers enlisted in the Army. He was assigned to the 7th Army Air Corp Intelligence Unit. There he created Topographic maps, and gathered strategic information from pilots returning from their missions. On the side, he painted various symbols on airplanes and tanks.

He returned to Cleveland in 1946 and enrolled in the Cleveland School of Art, (now called the Cleveland Institute of Art). Mentored principally by Jack Burton, noted industrial designer, along with Paul Travis, Frank Wilcox and Rolf Stoll, his earliest, notable illustration is a 1946 advertisement for Frigidaire of one of their new model refrigerators. Frank Wilcox as a teacher, systematically taught Lawton every aspect of making a watercolor painting. Because of Wilcox, and other well known artists in Cleveland during the 1940s, "they offered some of the most systematic training in watercolor technique available in the United States".

=== Marriage and children ===
From 1946 to 1948 Florian supported himself as a working artist doing illustrations for children's books as well as portraits. In 1948 he married Lois Mary Ondrey and they subsequently had four children. The first, in 1949, was Kenneth, followed by David, Dawn and Patricia. None have followed in their father's footsteps as an artist. He worked as a purchasing agent while he and his wife raised their children all the while painting on the side. His first major recognition came with an award bestowed by the Cleveland Museum of Art and its director, William Milliken for a watercolor, in 1949. This recognition provided the impetus to change his name from Lawicki to Lawton, to fit more comfortably into a culture that prized Anglo-Saxon traditions after the second world war. Living in Shaker Heights and the Chagrin Valley of northeast Ohio, his family and recognition as a regional artist grew.

=== Work ===
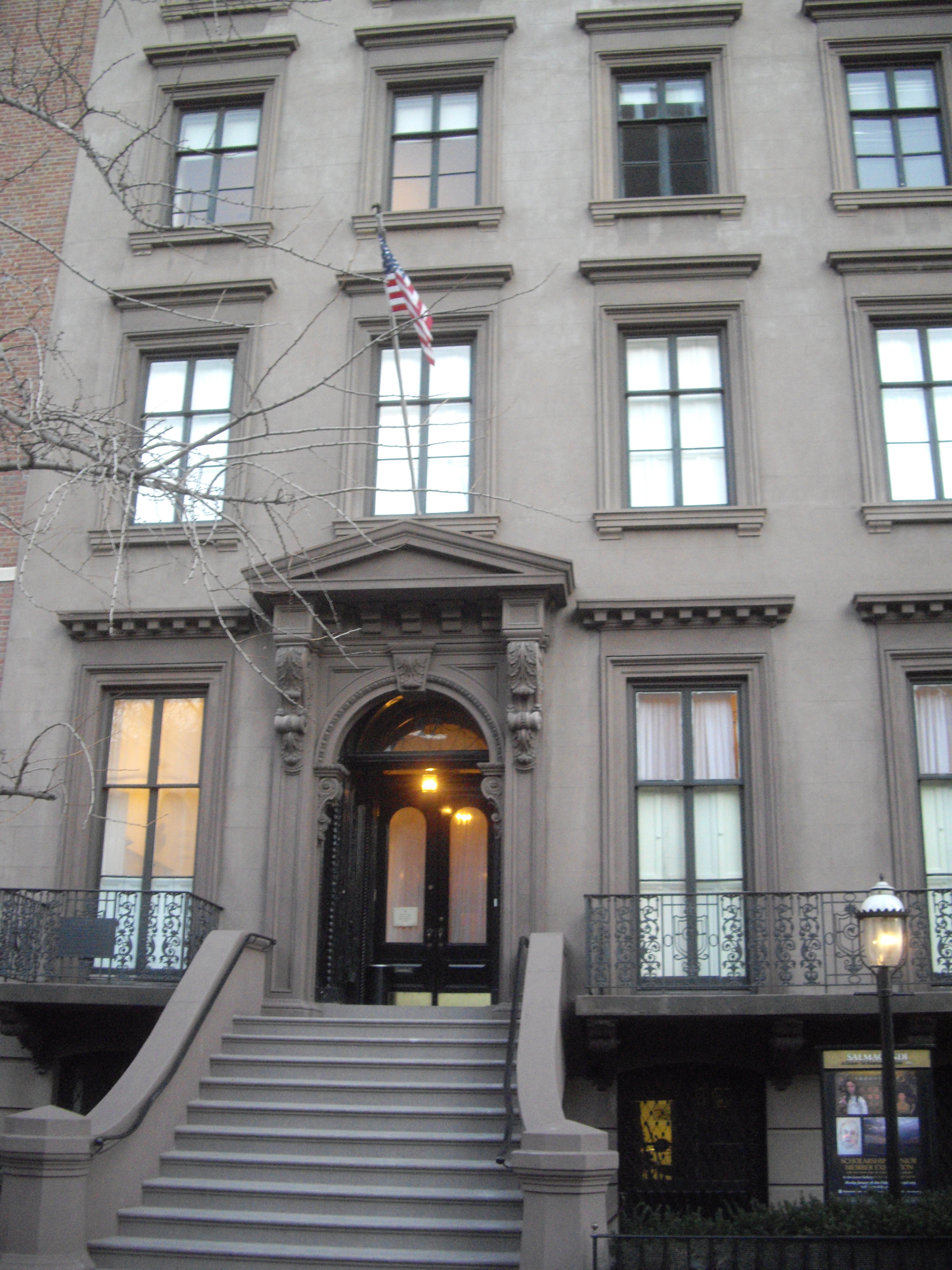
Lawton was invited to become a member of the Salmagundi Club in New York City.

Supporting a growing family by work for corporate America, Lawton followed his artistic development with exhibitions at the Chautauqua Institute in New York. He had a regional gallery relationship with the Bonfoey Gallery in Cleveland, Ohio, which handled his work successfully for many decades. The late 1960s and 1970s brought more honors and recognition through national exhibitions, for which he received many awards. An instructor at the Cleveland Institute of Art in the 1970s, he was invited to become a member of the Salmagundi Club in New York City. In 1970 he was featured on the watercolor page of the American Watercolor magazine. The same year a one-artist show at the Bonfoey Gallery sold out. Lawton was a realist painter in the tradition of Winslow Homer and Thomas Eakins. His favorite subjects were nature and the people around him. With a passion for the outdoors, sporting subjects were a favorite. Hunting and fishing scenes, produced commissions from patrons throughout the United States. Living in the Great Lakes region, in the 1960s, he became friends with a wide range of Amish families in Ohio, Pennsylvania and Indiana that resulted in a deep respect for their culture and the simplicity in their lives. A large body of narrative paintings and drawings were created of the Amish, from 1969 until the end of his career. His son, Kenneth Lawton, describes his father's interest in the Amish:

He found the Amish culture to be a perfect fit in terms of his personality. The simplicity of their culture, their reverence for nature. They don’t change things — they work within the balance of nature. That appealed to [my father] very much.

By 1974 he was able to stop working and paint full time.

In 1989 the Butler Institute of American Art recognized Lawton's accomplishments with a 25 Year Retrospective and again in 2010 with a 50 Year Retrospective, curated by Dr. Henry Adams, former curator of American art at the Cleveland Museum of Art, and professor of American art history at Case Western Reserve University. Further national recognition was achieved when a New York art collector and supporter of President Clinton in 2000 had a painting accepted for donation by the White House. Finding inspiration from the land and his deep personal respect for the Amish culture served Lawton throughout his career in all his creative pursuits. Living in the Great Lakes region throughout his life provided a fascination with the translucence of snow in his paintings. A master of technique, Lawton was able to achieve a transcendental quality in his winter paintings, with his mastery of his use of the "white-on-white technique" where the paper is virtually a "pigment" to create an emotional effect on the viewer.

=== Critical reaction ===
Clyde J. Singer, assistant director at the Butler Institute of American Art, said about the artist's work, "Lawton looks at the world at large with a glint in his eye and what he sees must look mighty good to him. His subjects are usually the basis for artistic commentary on the American scene, a term once mentioned to Edward Hopper in a questionable way when he visited Youngstown in the 1950s his reply 'What's wrong with that?' In these times of so much crudity and meaningless minimalism prominent in contemporary art, Lawton stands tall as a technically accomplished artist – and to repeat Hopper's words: 'What's wrong with that'."

Professor Henry Adams of Case Western Reserve University curated Lawton's second retrospective show at Youngstown's Butler Institute of American Art in 2010. Of Lawton's work he wrote, "Florian Lawton had a gentle touch, and excelled in the rendering of subtle winter scenes. He also had special affinity for the Amish, whose customs appealed to his sense of enduring values, and his drawings and watercolors of Amish subjects are remarkable not only in visual terms but for their value as a cultural and historical record."

=== Death ===
An engaging personality as an instructor, he taught watercolor classes in Ohio until the week before his death of natural causes, at age 89, on January 11, 2011.

== Museum and major public collections ==
- Cleveland Museum of Art (Cleveland, OH)
- Butler Institute of American Art (Youngstown, OH)
- The White House (Washington, D.C.)
- New York Canal Museum (Syracuse, NY)
- Cuyahoga Valley National Park Museum (Peninsula, OH)
- American Museum of Fly Fishing (Manchester, VT)
- Cleveland Clinic Foundation (Cleveland, OH)
- Bank of America (Charlotte, NC)
- Price Waterhouse Cooper (New York, NY)
- Eaton Corporation (New York, NY)
- Senator George Voinovich (Columbus, OH)
- Diamond Shamrock (Dallas, TX)
- King Khalid (Saudi Arabia)
- Salve Regina University (Newport, RI)
- Key Corporation (Cleveland, OH)
- Kaiser Permanente (Washington, D.C.)
- Chautauqua Institute (Chautauqua, NY)
- American Artist watercolor page (1970)
- Amish Romance, PBS Ohio Bicentennial Committee (1975)
- La Revue Moderne Des Arts Paris (1978)
- The Artist's Magazine cover and editorial (1996)
- Amish Pioneers, Reda Productions for Arts & Entertainment Network (1998)
- American Art Review (2009)
- Florian K. Lawton Fifty Years of Art, publication for the Butler Museum of American Art (2010)
- American Fly Fisher, journal of the American Fly Fishing Museum (2012)
- Chagrin Valley Magazine (2012)

By invitation Lawton was honored with memberships with the following national and regional art organizations:

- Salmagundi Club (New York, NY)
- American Watercolor Society (New York, NY)
- National Watercolor Society (Los Angeles, CA)
- Audubon Artists (New York, NY)
- Midwest Watercolor Society (Columbus, OH)
- Pennsylvania Watercolor Society (New Freedom, PA)
- Kentucky Watercolor Society (Louisville, KY)
- Whiskey Painters of America (Akron, OH)
- The Artist Fellowship (New York, NY)
