= Kami-Yakuno Station =

Railway station in Fukuchiyama, Kyoto Prefecture, Japan

Kami-Yakuno Station 上夜久野駅
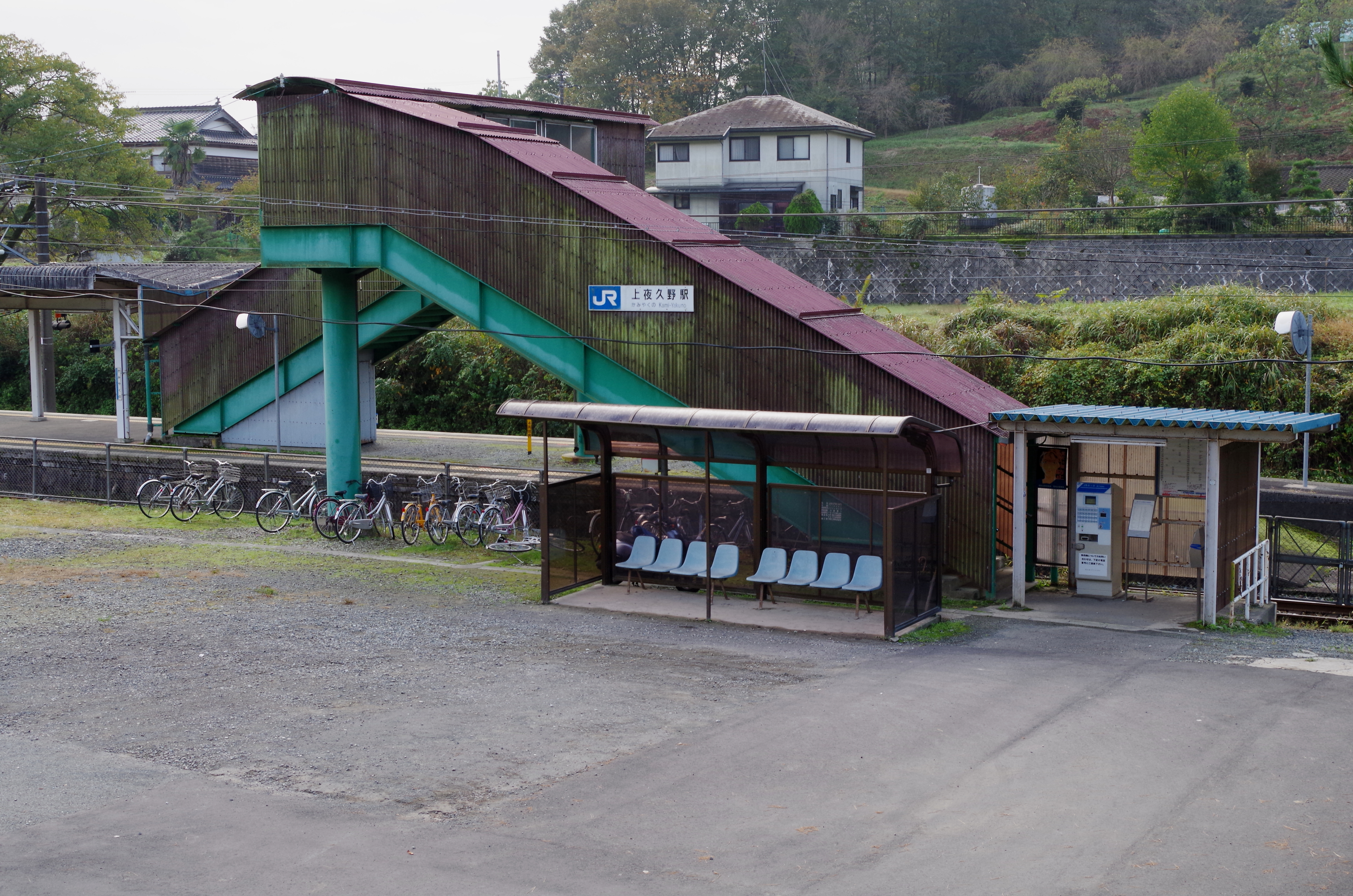
- Kami-Yakuno Station, October 2013

General information
- Location: Yakunocho Hirano, Fukuchiyama-shi, Kyoto-fu 629-1322; Japan
- Coordinates: 35°20′31″N 134°55′54″E
- Owner: West Japan Railway Company
- Operator: West Japan Railway Company
- Line: San'in Main Line
- Distance: 109.8 km (68.2 miles) from Kyoto
- Platforms: 1 island platform
- Connections: Bus stop

Construction
- Structure type: Ground level

Other information
- Status: Unstaffed
- Website: Official website

History
- Opened: 25 October 1911

Passengers
- FY 2023: 88 daily
Location
- Location within Kyoto Prefecture Location within Japan

Kami-Yakuno Station (上夜久野駅, Kami-Yakuno-eki) is a passenger railway station located in the city of Fukuchiyama, Kyoto Prefecture, Japan, operated by West Japan Railway Company (JR West).

== Lines ==
Kami-Yakuno Station is served by the San'in Main Line, and is located 109.8 kilometers from the terminus of the line at Kyoto.

== Station layout ==
The station consists of one ground-level island platform connected to the station building by a footbridge. The station is unattended.

=== Platforms ===
1	■ San'in Main Line	for Fukuchiyama, Kyoto and Osaka
2	■ San'in Main Line	for Wadayama and Toyooka

== Adjacent stations ==
«	Service	»
West Japan Railway Company (JR West) San'in Main Line
Limited Express Hamakaze: Does not stop at this station
Shimo-Yakuno	-	Yanase

== History ==
Kami-Yakuno Station opened on October 25, 1911. With the privatization of the Japan National Railways (JNR) on April 1, 1987, the station came under the aegis of the West Japan Railway Company.

== Passenger statistics ==
In fiscal 2016, the station was used by an average of 72 passengers daily

== Surrounding area ==
- Fukuchiyama Municipal Seika Elementary School

== See also ==
- List of railway stations in Japan
