= Nictoglobe =

Netherlands magazine

- Editor: Andreas Maria Jacobs
- Categories: Art & Humanities
- Frequency: quarterly
- Publisher: A. Andreas
- First issue: 1982 (stencil) • 1986 (online)
- Country: Netherlands
- Language: English
- Website: www.nictoglobe.com
- ISSN: 1874-9534

Nictoglobe is an online art magazine. Its international contributors are working in arts related fields, such as (digital) writing, painting, poetry and activism. Nictoglobe is edited and published by A. Andreas (Andreas Maria Jacobs) who was born in the Netherlands in 1956.

== Early years ==
Nictoglobe started sometime in 1982 as a stenciled paper, exclusively and privately distributed on the local night bus service in Amsterdam, The Netherlands. Copies of these first printings are available at the International Institute of Social History (IISG) in Amsterdam. The printed edition was followed up by electronic editions on Bulletin Board Systems. Later editions were put on MSXII systems, and finally on TeleText modules.

== Internet era ==
With the arrival of ARPAnet in Europe in the late 80s, new editions were placed on the Internet. New collaborations include the 'Ey Ar' shows and the founding of the Brahamian Intelligence Service in 2004.

In summer 2007, Nictoglobe organized @ De Balie - Centre for Culture and Politics, Amsterdam, using free publicly accessible open source software tools, developed and provided by de Balie, a DIY CoolMediaHotTalkShow about 'Creative Resistance, New Media as Soft Arms'.

== Other projects ==
Nictoglobe created La Resocialista Internacional a poetical multi-lingual website which also goes under the original Dutch title: Burgerwaanzin.nl. This project gained some global attention expressed by its inclusion in new media festivals a.o File Festival São Paulo (2011), File Rio (2012), Brazil and the European Anthology of Electronic Writing, ELMCIP Blekinge Institute of Technology, Sweden (2012)

The netart project Semantic Disturbances (2007 - 2012), included in different new-media art related periodicals: Web del Sol, US, Hyperrhiz, US and collections such as Runme.org UK, Rhizome's Artbase, US and the Electronic Literature Collection Volume 2, Electronic Literature Organization US (2010)

11 Ways to escape the symbolic Field, experimental electronic poems using internet driven imagery was featured at ISEA 2012 in Albuquerque, New Mexico US after its first live performance at Stichting Perdu Amsterdam (2011) and will be featured at the ELO Conference/Festival Chercher le Texte in Paris, France (2013)

== Friction Research ==
Nictoglobe publishes (almost) yearly a themed special on new media practices, Friction Research.

- 2011 Friction Research #4: Reclaim the Mind
- 2010 Friction Research #3: Art is not about Communication
- 2009 Friction Research #2: Investigating Ruptures in the Art-Political Grid
- 2007 Friction Research #1: Creative Resistance, New Media as soft Arms

== See also ==
List of art magazines
