= Art and Architecture Journal =

Art and Architecture Journal (A&AJ) was a printed quarterly art magazine published between 1980 and 2009. Edited by Jeremy Hunt it was re-launched with issue 61 in February 2005.

AAJPress is the successor to the Art and Architecture Journal currently presented as an online blog, providing information and communication on public art commissions, projects, collaboration and architecture based in the United Kingdom.

AAJPress includes: commemorative and memorial public art – environmental and land art - sculpture parks and gardens – architecture and urban design - urban regeneration - corporate collections - art in health - interior design – crafts and applied art - education and training - 20th century history and theory - critical debate and dialogue - temporary projects, performance and installations - festivals and biennales -political and community issues - experimental areas of film, digital media and sound - literature, dance and music as public art.
