= TradeArt =

- Categories: Underground art
- Frequency: Bimonthly
- Format: 7 x 10.75" (Black and white)
- Circulation: 2000
- Publisher: TradeArt Incorporated
- First issue: March 1999
- Country: USA
- Based in: Washington
- Language: English
- ISSN: 1523-4347

TradeArt was an underground art magazine first published by TradeArt Incorporated in March 1999. TradeArt began in the Maryland suburbs of Washington, DC just as artists were demanding more arts coverage in mainstream newspapers. With The Washington Star out of publication, a public not yet won over by The Washington Times, and USA Today offering mainly snippets of national news, The Washington Post was the area's leading news source. Artists had to compete for limited coverage of the arts and cultural events.

== Free creative expression ==
TradeArt allowed artists to design their own news source. It was based on sourcebook advertising, a tool of the trade for commercial illustrators, photographers and designers offering creative services to advertising agencies, design studios, and publishing companies. Unlike sourcebooks, TradeArt mainly targeted classically trained artists. Poets, painters, sculptors, dancers, musicians and actors were encouraged to express their arts ideas without the judgment of art critics and without censorship.
With its barter ads allowing artists with limited financial resources to acquire products without exchanging money, its no-holds-barred editorial content, and its free diffusion in public spaces, it was an irreverent voice in the conservative political capital. The Washington Post quickly hailed it as a "chance for artists to showcase and barter their work." News about the bimonthly art magazine spread across the nation. The Fort Wayne Journal Gazette noted that "TradeArt opens doors for artists." Other newspapers focused their headlines on TradeArt's barter ads, which allowed artists to trade art for professional services.

== From underground to overseas ==
In 2000, TradeArt's publisher reorganized as a national nonprofit 501(c)(3) organization. Publication was interrupted between 2001 and 2004, when the public charitable organization led artists on an international solidarity project with children.

In 2005, TradeArt Incorporated transferred the publication rights to TradeArt Abroad, an international association established in France in 2004. TradeArt Abroad aimed to extend TradeArt to artists in countries where poverty is an issue. The international recreated TradeArt, The voice of the international artist community as a bilingual quarterly. The bilingual version, edited in English and French, was published in Paris in January 2007. With a seed grant from the European Commission, its first objective was to open doors for artists affected by the persistent socioeconomic crises in France.

Association TradeArt Abroad relinquished the publication rights to TradeArt Incorporated in 2008.
