= Mavo =

Art movement in Japan

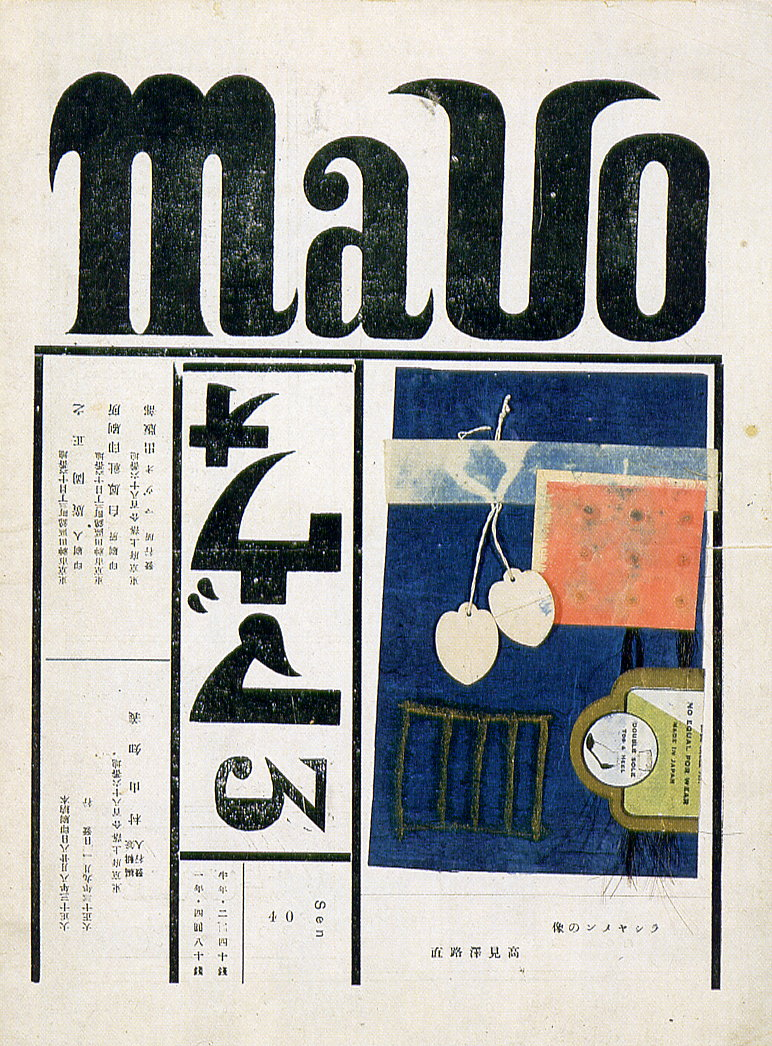
Cover Mavo #3, collection of Machiya City Museum of Graphic Art

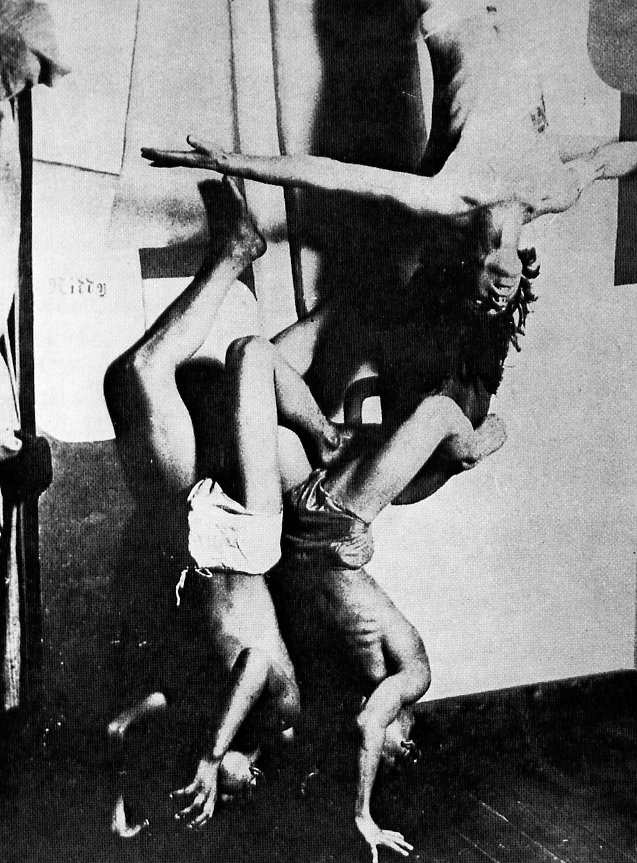
MAVO Dance

Mavo (often styled MaVo or MAVO) was a radical Japanese art movement of the 1920s. Founded in 1923, Mavo was productive during the late Taishō period (1912–26). Mavo re-instituted the Japanese Association of Futurist Artists, the anarchistic artist group who displayed an outdoor exhibit in Ueno Park in Tokyo in protest of conservatism in the Japanese art world.

Led by Tomoyoshi Murayama, the group deployed an interdisciplinary array of performance art, painting, illustration and architecture, to communicate anti-establishment messages to the mainstream. Fueled by responses to industrial development, the Mavo group created works about crisis, peril and uncertainty. Art historian Gennifer Weisenfeld has written that Mavo sought to reintegrate art into daily life.

"Mavoist" artists sought to disrupt or blur the boundaries between art and daily life. They rebelled against the establishment by combining industrial products with painting or printmaking, usually in collage form. Their performance art protests against social injustice deployed theatrical eroticism, that mocked public norms for morality at the time.

== History ==
=== Predecessors ===
Before the Meiji state, Mavo's predecessors engaged in Western-style painting (yо̄ga), which was promoted by the Tokugawa government.

=== Early years ===
Founder members of Mavo were Murayama Tomoyoshi, Oura Shuzo, Yanase Masamu, Ogata Kamenosuke, and Kadowaki Shinro. The group expanded quickly between young artists.

During a 1923 demonstration, Takamizawa Michinao, one of the members of Mavo, threw rocks in protest, through a glass ceiling of a building housing an exhibition of artworks curated by Nika-kai (The Second Society). Nika-kai was established in 1914 to oppose the conservative Bunten, the governmental Ministry of Education Exhibition. Murayama had spent 1922 in Berlin where he became familiar with the social satire painting of Georg Grosz, Wassily Kandinsky's "spiritual" abstract paintings, El Lissitzky's constructivist works, and Alexander Archipenko's sculptures. As a cultural leader and public figure, Murayama had a confident, flamboyant personality, an androgynous physical presence sporting a bob-hairstyle, and posing for photographs in states of undress.

== Associated artists ==
Mavo Magazine #4

Other artists involved in the movement include Tatsuo Okada, Masao Kato, Masamu Yanase, Kamenosuke Ogata, Shuzo Oura and Shinro Kadowaki, and later Osamu Shibuya, Shuichiro Kinoshita, Iwane Sumiya, Michinao Takamizawa, Kimimaro Yabashi, Tatsuo Todai, and Kyojiro Hagiwara, among others.

== Magazine ==
Tatsuo Okada and Tomoyoshi Murayama edited MAVO magazine, that published seven issues between July 1924 and August 1925. The publication included essays on socio-cultural art, poetry, and theatrical texts. The pages included original linocut prints and photographic reproductions of visual art that often appropriated the work of their own members. Reuse and recycling from one project to another was one of the group's trademark strategies. Originally, Mavo Magazine's third issue came with a firecracker adhered to its cover.

== Artists' books ==
Several members of the group produced short-run artist's books including Hagiwara Kyojiro's Shikei senkoku (Death Sentence), an anthology of visual poetry published in 1925, and illustrated by Mavo; Ernst Toller's Tsubame no sho, (The Swallow Book) illustrated by Tatsuo Okada and translated by Tomoyoshi Murayama (1925); and Hideo Saito's Aozameta douteikyo, (The Pale-faced Virgin's Mad Thoughts) visual poetry published in 1926 and illustrated by Tatsuo Okada.
