= Bedeutung =

UK magazine on philosophy, art, and literature

Bedeutung was a magazine of philosophy, current affairs, art and literature published in the UK. The name 'bedeutung' comes from the German word which means 'meaning'.

== Publication ==
Bedeutung was started in May 2007 and was intended as a quarterly. It featured a number of essays by prominent philosophers, sociologists, authors, public intellectuals, thinkers, artists and curators on a range of topics that are overarched by a general theme that runs through the whole issue. Issue 1 was on the distinction between Nature & Culture. It was suggested that the magazine should be read in the sequence that it is printed, as its structure gradually moves from abstract philosophical ('Philosophy' section) to more concrete and "journalistic" type of articles ('Current Affairs' section) leading, eventually, to the 'Art' section and closing with the 'Literature' section.

The issue of the magazine themed "Human & Divine" featured articles by the Archbishop of Canterbury, Rowan Williams, LSE political philosopher, John Gray, renowned atheist philosopher, A. C. Grayling, LSE social scientist Nicos Mouzelis, an interview with anti-religion crusader Michel Onfray and features the Austrian actionist artist Hermann Nitsch, British artist Becky Beasley, Miuccia Prada protégé Martino Gamper and Warren Neidich. It also includes a piece by author Sarah Wood. The back cover features an extract by Italian philosopher Giorgio Agamben. According to the editorial, the second issue of the magazine sets out to defend the view that our idea of secularism bears significant conceptual resemblances with religious belief, in that it is based in faith, rather than objective knowledge.

The third issue of Bedeutung appeared in 2010 and was themed "Life & Death". It appears there have been no further issues.

== Notable contributors, interviewees and artists featured ==
- Slavoj Žižek
- Cornelius Castoriadis
- Nick Davies
- Martin Durkin
- Okwui Enwezor
- David Goldblatt
- Guy Tillim
- Apostolos Doxiadis
- Michel Onfray
- John Gray
- Rowan Williams
- A. C. Grayling
- Hermann Nitsch
- Giorgio Agamben

== Editorial ==
- Alex Stavrakas (Editor-in-Chief and Creative Director)
- Michael Withey (Editor)
- Thomas Presskorn (Editor)
- John Slyce (Art Editor)
