= Yanase (surname) =

Yanase (written: 柳瀬, 簗瀬 or やなせ in hiragana) is a Japanese surname. Notable people with the surname include:

- Akihiro Yanase (柳瀬 明宏; born 1983), Japanese baseball player
- Akira Yanase (柳瀬 彰良; born 1988), Japanese water polo player
- Hisae Yanase (柳瀬 久恵; 1943–2019), Japanese ceramist, painter, sculptor
- Kaori Yanase (簗瀬 かおり; born 1967), Japanese swimmer
- Masamu Yanase (柳瀬 正夢; 1900–1945), Japanese visual artist
- Natsumi Yanase (やなせ なつみ; born 1971), Japanese voice actress
- Susumu Yanase (簗瀬 進; born 1950), Japanese politician
- Takashi Yanase (やなせ たかし; 1919–2013), Japanese writer, poet, illustrator and lyricist

== Fictional characters ==
- Kaori Yanase (Variable Geo) (梁瀬 かおり), a character in the video game Variable Geo
