= List of art reference books =

This is a list of out-of-copyright books and journals about art and artists, available online to read or download. Includes the visual arts, such as painting, engraving, sculpture etc., only.

== Encyclopedias of artists ==
- Biographical dictionary of medallists: coin, gem, and seal engravers, mint-masters, etc. by Leonard Forrer (London: Spink & son, 1904):

Volume 1 (A–D) (missing)
Volume 2 (E–H)
Volume 3 (I–Maz)
Volume 4 (M.B.–Q)
Volume 5 (R–S)
Volume 6 (T–Z).
Volume 7 = Supplement

- Bryan's dictionary of painters and engravers (New York: Macmillan, 1903). Illustrated:

Volume 1 (A–C)
Volume 2 (D–G)
Volume 3 (H–M)
Volume 4 (N–R)
Volume 5 (S–Z)

- Dictionary of National Biography (Smith, Elder & Co., 1885–1901). Comprehensive biographical resource including British and Irish artists up to the year 1900 or so.
- Cyclopedia of painters and paintings, by J. D. Champlin & C. C. Perkins (New York: C. Scribner's sons, 1913). Illustrated with b/w drawings of art, artists and their monograms:

Volume 1 (Aagaard to Dyer)
Volume 2 (Eakins to Kyhn)
Volume 3 (Laar to Quost)
Volume 4 (Raab to Zyl & supplement).

- English female artists by Ellen Creathorne Clayton (London, Tinsley Brothers, 1876):

Volume 1
Volume 2.

== Art history ==
=== Engraving ===
- Die deutschen Maler-Radierer des neunzehnten Jahrhunderts (German painters and engravers of the 19th century) by Andreas Andresen & Josef Eduard Wessely (Rudolph Weigel, 1866). German text.
- French engravers of the eighteenth century by A. Younger (London: Simpkin, Marshall, Hamilton Kent, 1913).
- French engravers and draughtsmen of the 18th century by E. F. S. Dilke (London: Bell, 1902). Illustrated.
- Les graveurs du dix-huitième siècle (Engravers of the 18th century) by Roger Portalis & Henri Béraldi (Paris D. Morgand et C. Fatout, 1880). French text:

Vol. 1, pt. 1 (Adam to Chevillet)
Vol. 1, pt. 2 (Chodowiecki to Dossier)
Vol. 2, pt. 1 (Les Drevet to Heinecken)
Vol. 2, pt. 2 (Helman to Marais)
Vol. 3, pt. 1 (Marcenay de Ghuy to Robert)
Vol. 3, pt. 1 (Roger to Zingg).

- The old engravers of England: in their relation to contemporary life and art, by Malcolm C. Salaman (London: Cassell, 1906).

=== Painting ===
- Animal painters of England from the year 1650 by Sir Walter Gilbey (London: Vinton & Co., 1900):

Volume 1 – Alken to Gooch
Volume 2 – Hancock to Wooton

- Artistes Francais a l'étranger (French artists abroad) by Louis Dussieux (Paris: Gide & J. Baudry, 1856). French text.
- English painters by H. J. Wilmot-Buxton (London : S. Low, Marston, Searle, & Rivington, 1883). Illustrated.
- Die deutschen Maler-Radierer des neunzehnten Jahrhunderts (German painters and engravers of the 19th century) by Andreas Andresen & Josef Eduard Wessely (Rudolph Weigel, 1866). German text.
- French Painting by R. H. Wilenski (Boston, Hale, Cushman & Flint, inc., 1931). Comprehensive history of French art from earliest times. Illustrated in b/w
- French painting in the sixteenth century by Louis Dimitier (London Duckworth, 1904).
- The history of American painting by Samuel Isham (New York: Macmillan, 1905). Illustrated.
- A history of painting by Haldane Macfall (London, T. C. and E. C. Jack, 1911–1912). Illustrated:

Volume 1 – The renaissance in central Italy
Volume 2 – The renaissance in Venice
Volume 3 – Later Italians and genius of Spain
Volume 4 – The renaissance in the north & the Flemish genius
Volume 5 – The Dutch Genius
Volume 6 – The French genius
Volume 7 – The British genius
Volume 8 – The modern genius

- The history of modern painting by Richard Muther (London : J. M. Dent, 1907). Illustrated:

Volume 1
Volume 2
Volume 3
Volume 4

- A history of water-colour painting in England by G. R. Redgrave (London: Society for Promoting Christian Knowledge, 1905). Illustrated.
- Six centuries of painting by Randall Davies (New York : Dodge Pub. Co., 1914).
- The story of Spanish painting by C. H. Caffin (London, Unwin, 1910).
- Women artists in all ages and countries by E. F. Ellet (New York : Harper & Brothers, 1859).
- Women painters of the world, from the time of Caterina Vigri, 1413–1463, to Rosa Bonheur and the present day by W. S. Sparrow (London: Hodder & Stoughton, 1905). Illustrated.

== Biographies of artists ==
=== Individual artists ===
- Charles Bentley, member of the "Old Water-Colour" Society by Frederic Gordon Roe (London, Walker's Galleries, 1921). Illustrated.
- Boucher by Haldane Macfall (London: T.C. & E.C Jack, 1911). The life and work of François Boucher (1703–1770).
- A.F. Cals: ou, Le bonheur de peindre by Alexandre, Arsène (Paris: G. Petit, 1900). French language.
- Constable by C. J. Holmes (London: At the sign of the Unicorn, 1901). Landscape artist John Constable. Illustrated.
- Fragonard by Haldane Macfall (London: T.C. & E.C. Jack, 1909). The life and work of Jean-Honoré Fragonard (1732–1806).
- The book of Lovat, Claud Fraser by Haldane Macfall (London: J.M. Dent, 1923). The life and work of Claud Lovat Fraser (1890–1921).
- William Payne, water-colour painter working 1776–1830 by Basil S. Long (London, Walker's Galleries, 1922). Illustrated.
- Vigée-Le Brun by Haldane Macfall (London: T.C. & E.C. Jack, 1909). The life and work of Élisabeth-Louise Vigée-Le Brun (1755–1842).
- Whistler by Haldane Macfall (Boston: J. W. Luce, 1906). The life and work of James McNeill Whistler.
- Araripe by Alexei Bueno and others (Tiradentes: Oscar Araripe Foundation, 2011). The life and work of Oscar Araripe (1941–...).

=== Collected biographies ===
- Four Irish landscape painters, George Barret, R. A., James A. O'Connor, Walter F. Osborne, R. H. A., Nathaniel Hone, R. H. A. by Thomas Bodkin (London, T. F. Unwin ltd., 1920). B/w illustrations.
- German masters of art by H. A. Dickinson (New York, F.A. Stokes, 1914).
- Great English painters by Alan Cunningham (Philadelphia : Jacobs, 1908). Illustrated. Included early artists up to Holbein, then, Hogarth, Wilson, Reynolds, Gainsborough and Blake.
- Great English painters by Francis Downman (London: W. Scott, 1886). Illustrated. Life and work of Hogarth, Reynolds, Gainsborough, Romney, Morland, Lawrence, Turner and Constable.
- Landscape and figure painters of America by F. F. Sherman (New York, privately printed, 1917). Biographies of Homer Dodge Martin, Robert Loftin Newman, Ralph Albert Blakelock, Albert Pinkham Ryder, Lilian M. Genth, Elliot Daingerfield, Winslow Homer, Alexander H. Wyant, Dwight W. Tryon, J. Francis Murphy. Illustrated.
- The landscape and pastoral painters of Holland: Ruisdael, Hobbema, Cuijp, Potter by Frank Cundall (New York, Scribner and Welford, 1891).
- The modern school of art by Wilfrid Meynell (London: W. R. Howell & Co., c. 1887). Biographies of British 19th-century painters. Illustrated:

Volume 1
Volume 2
Volume 3
Volume 4.

- Old English Masters by Timothy Cole (New York: The Century Co., 1902). Artists from Hogarth to Landseer. Illustrated.
- The Wyons by L. Forrer (London: Spink & Son, ltd., 1917). Talented family of designers, die-engravers and medallists. Illustrated in b/w.

== Specific art topics ==
- British Marine Painting by C. G. Holme, Ed (London;Paris; New York: The Studio, 1919). Illustrated.
- China painting by W.H. Miller (Anglo- French Art Co., 1912). Encyclopedia of methods of decorating and firing porcelain.
- The development of British landscape painting in water-colours by Charles Home (Ed.) (London, "The Studio", 1918). Illustrated.
- The earlier English water-colour painters by W. C. Monkhouse (London, Seeley, 1897). Illustrated.
- Early English water-colour drawings by great masters by Geoffrey Holme (Ed.) (The Studio, London, 1919).Illustrated.
- The English pre-Raphaelite painters, their associates and successors by Percy H. Bate (London: G. Bell & Sons, 1905). B/w illustrations.
- Famous Paintings: Volume 1, Volume 2 (Cassell, 1891). Many high-quality colour plates of paintings by artists of all nationalities.
- The French pastellists of the eighteenth century by Haldane Macfall (London: Macmillan, 1909).
- A history of the "Old water-colour" society, now the Royal society of painters in water colours: Volume 1, Volume 2 by John Lewis Roget (London, Longmans, Green, and co., 1891).
- The ideals of painting by J. Comyns Carr (New York, Macmillan, 1917). An Art history focusing on the ideals that inspired European artists throughout the ages.
- International Art Markets by James Goodwin (2009) subtitled The Essential Guide for Collectors and Investors.
- Landscape painting and modern Dutch artists by E. B. Greenshields (New York Baker and Taylor, 1906)
- Modern British water-colour drawings by Alfred Lys Baldrey (London, The Studio, 1900).
- The Norwich School by Geoffrey Holme (Ed.) (The Studio Ltd., 1920). About the artists of the English Norwich School.
- Shakespeare in pictorial art by M. C. Salaman (The Studio Ltd., 1916). Illustrated.

== Art Journals ==
- The Magazine of Art. Illustrated art journal which ran from 1878 to 1904.
- The Studio International – an illustrated magazine of fine and applied art. 1893–1980. Illustrated. Only volumes out of copyright are held.
- The Wide World Magazine (Pub. by George Newnes). Travel and adventure magazine (1898–1965). Hundreds of b/w photos and drawings by top illustrators of the Victorian/ Edwardian period.
- Art International

== See also ==
- List of art magazines
