= 20x20 magazine =

British arts and literature magazine

20x20 magazine is a London-based British art and literature publication. It was started in 2008, by editors Francesca Ricci and Giovanna Paternò, formerly of the underground art publication Interlude. 20x20 takes its name from its physical size and dimension. The magazine has published seven issues to date based on themes such as "Gone Beyond", "Hunger for Distraction" and "Harmonia Mundi".

20x20 has close links to a number of arts organisations and events, including the Glasgow International Artist Bookfair, WildeBoekenMarkt (Rotterdam), CCA Book Fair (Centre for Contemporary Arts, Glasgow), Publish and Be Damned, and By Leaves We Live (The Scottish Poetry Library, Edinburgh, 2009). It has also been behind a number of London-based events and exhibitions, including "Collected Visions" at Madame Lillies Gallery, London in 2010.

== See also ==
- List of literary magazines
