= Geometricae =

- Editor-in-Chief: Gianfranco Spada
- Categories: Visual arts, Art, Geometric abstraction, Abstract art
- Frequency: Monthly
- Circulation: Online
- Founded: 2015
- Country: Spain
- Based in: Valencia
- Language: Multilingual: English, Spanish, French, Italian
- Website: geometricae.com
- ISSN: 2605-5309

Geometricae is an art magazine covering international geometric abstraction. It was founded in 2015 as a non-profit digital magazin by a group of artists and art critics led by architect Gianfranco Spada, in Valencia, Spain.

== Content ==
Geometricae includes multilingual features on geometric abstract art such as interviews and reviews, highlighting notable new exhibitions around the world and showcasing artworks from emerging to established practitioners. Publications have included interviews to relatives of Max Bill, Eusebio Sempere, and conversation with Carlos Cruz-Diez, among others.
