= Masamu Yanase =

Japanese visual artist

- Self reflection, self-portrait, collection of the Musashino Art University Museum & Library
- Born: Yanase Shoroku; January 12, 1900; Ehime, Japan
- Died: May 25, 1945 (aged 45)
- Known for: Painting, graphic design, manga

Masamu Yanase (柳瀬正夢; 1900–1945; born Shōroku Yanase, 柳瀬正六) was a Japanese visual artist.

== Early life ==
Masamu Yanase was born January 12, 1900, in Ehime, Japan, and his family relocated to Fukuoka where he spent his childhood until age 14. During his teenage years he changed his given name, Shōroku, to Masamu, and included the kanji character for "dream" (夢) into his chosen name. At the age of 14, he left his parents home in Kyushu, arriving in Tokyo. Due to lack of income, he traveled between his home and Tokyo to be able to survive. He had an innate talent for art, yet had no art-school training. His abilities allowed him to find patrons for his work, and this in turn enabled him to continue making art.

== Career ==
His early work was in oil painting. In the early 1920s he became interested in the Japanese Futurist movement, and joined the Miraiha-Bijutsu Kyokai (Futurist Art Society). He became interested in political issues, and became intrigued with the Constructivist movement, it was at that time that he joined the avant garde radical art collective, Mavo.

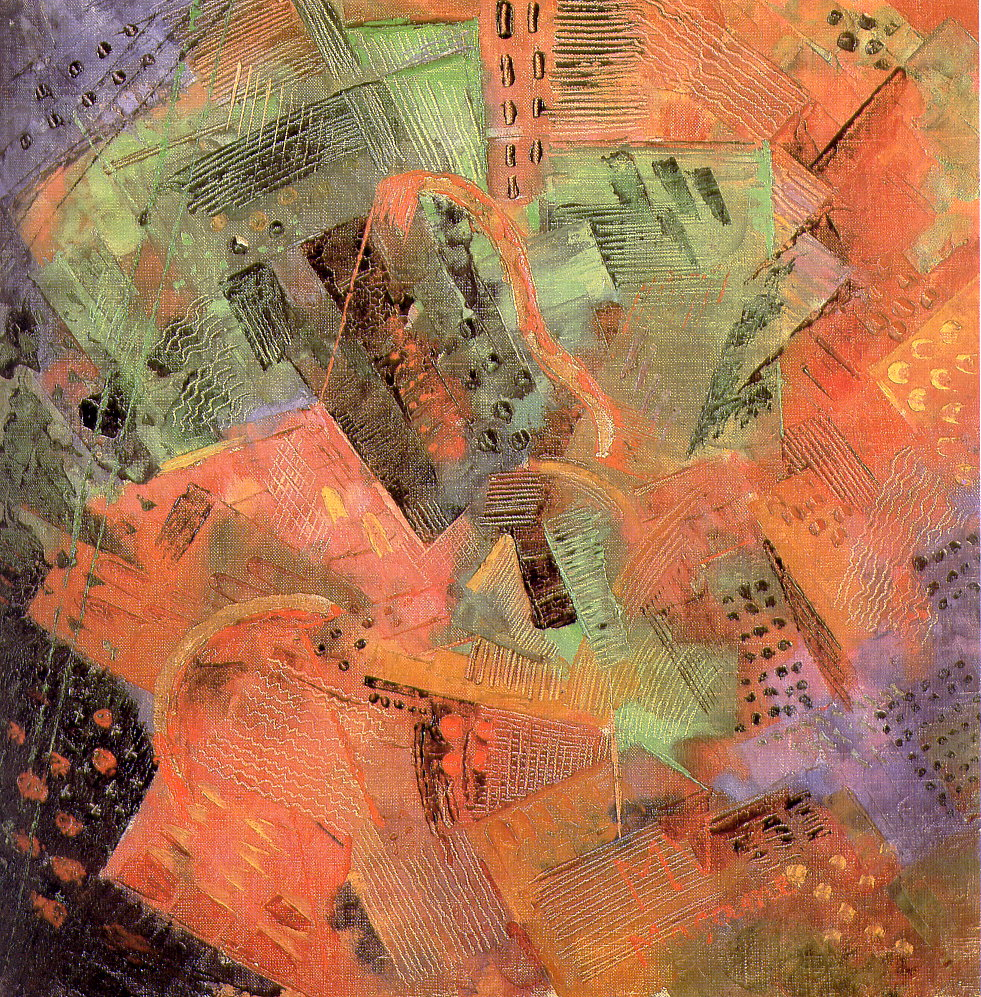
A Morning in May and Me before Breakfast, 1923. Musashino Art University Museum

After the Great Kanto Earthquake in 1923, Yanase was arrested during a round-up of radicals, which inspired him to become even more political. In response to this new radical political spirit, he discontinued painting, which he viewed as a bourgeois activity, to begin working on posters, graphics and other forms of mass communication and popular art forms such as comics and cartoons. In 1931, he joined the then illegal Japanese Communist Party. In 1932, he was arrested and tortured by the Special Higher Police on suspicion of violating the Peace Preservation Law. His social commentary cartoons were published in the Yomiuri Shimbun newspaper. Some of Yananse's manga drawings were inspired by the German artist, George Grosz, as in the 1924 manga, The Face of the Bourgeoise Composed out of (the works of) Grosz.

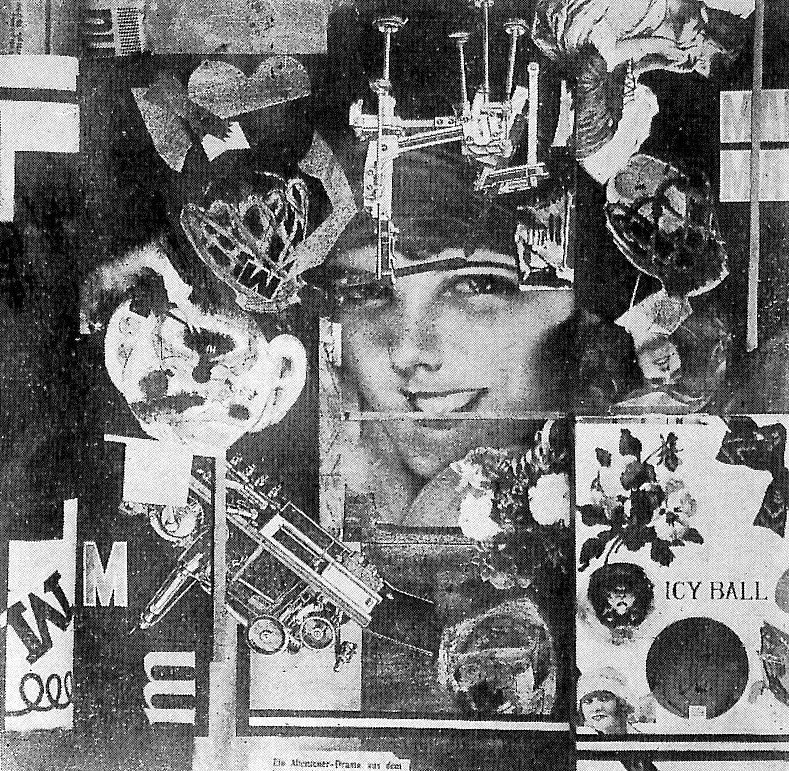
The Length of a Capitalist's Drool, 1924. Lost photograph.

Yanase had a comprehensive one person retrospective exhibition entitled "Yanase Masamu: A Retrospective 1900–1945" at The Museum of Modern Art, Hayama that included over 500 of his works.

== Collections ==
Yanase's work is held in the permanent collection of the National Museum of Art in Japan. The Ohio State University has several of his works held in their Manga Collection. Several of his posters are held in the Tokyo Mushashinoa Art University Collection. His work is held in the permanent collection of The Museum of Modern Art, Kamakura & Hayama. Two books with illustrations by Yanase are in the Museum of Fine Arts, Boston permanent collection.

== Death ==
Yanase was killed at the west exit of Shinjuku station during the Yamanote Air Raid on May 25, 1945.
