= Culture Lounge =

American magazine

The Culture Lounge
- Categories: Art magazine
- Frequency: Every Other Month
- Founded: 2006
- Country: United States
- Based in: Columbus Nebraska

The Culture Lounge is a visual art, philosophy, literary, and culture magazine that emphasizes diversity and expression through the creative forms.

Published in Columbus, Nebraska, since May 2006, the main focus is raising the awareness of the individual and embracing cultural differences throughout the magazine. They have interviewed musicians such as Two Gallants and visual artists C.Hues who did tour posters for The Grateful Dead.

Utilizing the internet has allowed Culture Lounge to find contributors outside of the United States and each issue boasts the use and recognition of contributors from around the world.
