= Yanase Station =

Railway station in Asago, Hyōgo Prefecture, Japan

Yanase Station 梁瀬駅
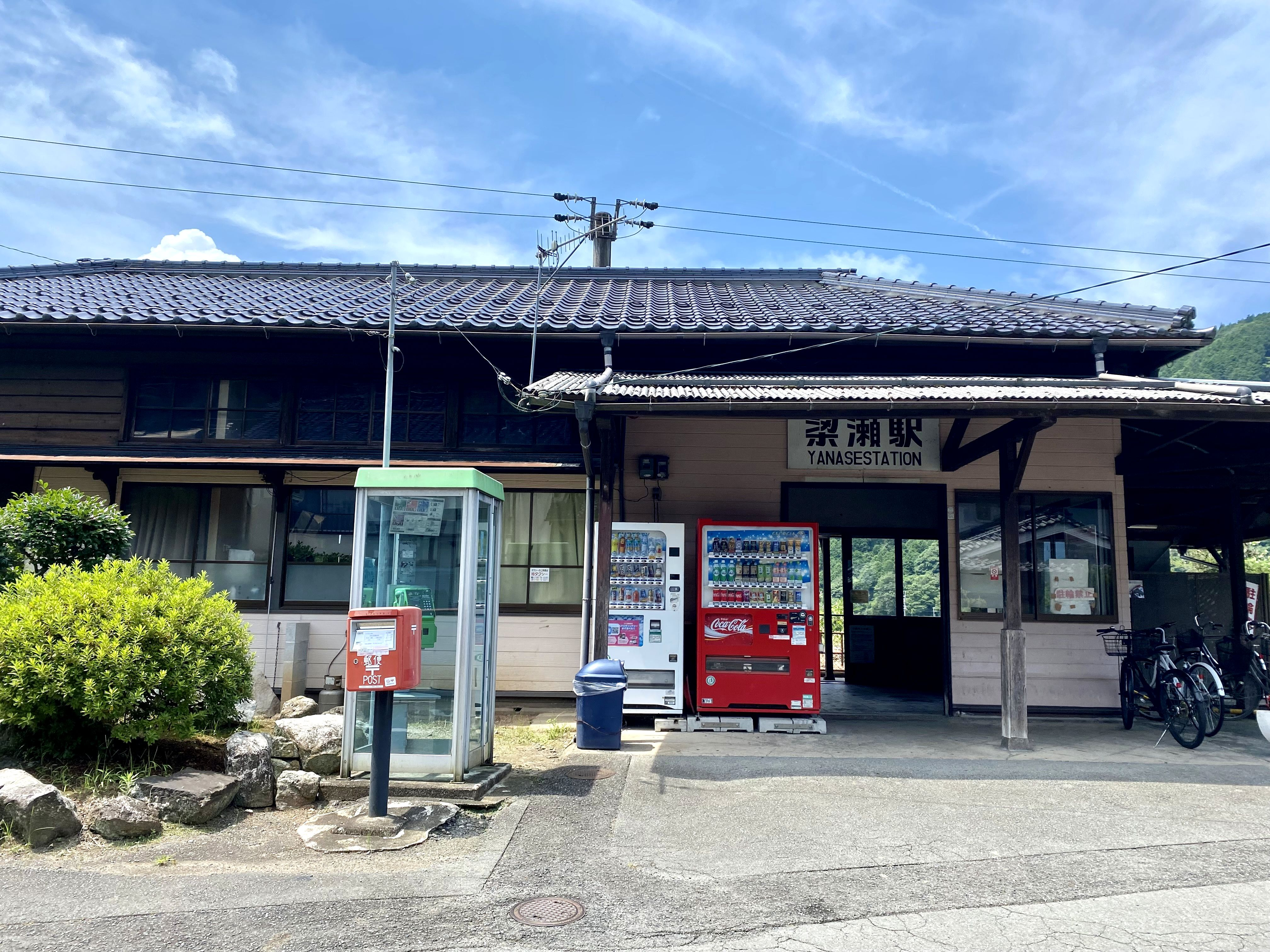
- Yanase Station, August 2006

General information
- Location: Santocho Takita, Asago-shi, Hyōgo-ken 669-5101; Japan
- Coordinates: 35°19′20″N 134°52′53″E
- Owner: West Japan Railway Company
- Operator: West Japan Railway Company
- Line: San'in Main Line
- Distance: 115.6 km (71.8 miles) from Kyoto
- Platforms: 1 island platform
- Connections: Bus stop

Construction
- Structure type: Ground level

Other information
- Status: Staffed
- Website: Official website

History
- Opened: 25 October 1911

Passengers
- FY 2023: 222 daily
Location
- Location within Hyōgo Prefecture Location within Japan

Yanase Station (梁瀬駅, Yanase-eki) is a passenger railway station located in the city of Asago, Hyōgo Prefecture, Japan, operated by West Japan Railway Company (JR West).

== Lines ==
Yanase Station is served by the San'in Main Line, and is located 115.6 kilometers from the terminus of the line at Kyoto.

== Station layout ==
The station consists of one ground-level island platform connected to the station building by a footbridge. The station is staffed.

=== Platforms ===
1	■ San'in Main Line	for Kyoto and Osaka
2	■ San'in Main Line	for Toyooka and Kinosaki Onsen

== Adjacent stations ==
«	Service	»
West Japan Railway Company (JR West) San'in Main Line
Kami-Yakuno	-	Wadayama

== History ==
Yanase Station opened on October 25, 1911. With the privatization of the Japan National Railways (JNR) on April 1, 1987, the station came under the aegis of the West Japan Railway Company.

== Passenger statistics ==
In fiscal 2016, the station was used by an average of 135 passengers daily

== Surrounding area ==
- Japan National Route 9
- Asago Municipal Ryose Junior High School

== See also ==
- List of railway stations in Japan
