= Art International =

- Editor: Michael Peppiatt
- Former editors: James A. Fitzsimmons
- Categories: Art Journal (Magazine)
- Publisher: James A. Fitzsimmons (1957-1984), Archive Press (1987-1991)
- Founded: 1957
- Final issue: 1991
- Company: Art International
- Country: Switzerland (1957-1984), France (1987-1991)
- Based in: Lugano (1957-1984), Paris (1987-1991)
- Language: English, German, French, Italian
- ISSN: 0004-3230
- OCLC: 1978279

Art International known as Art International Magazine, was an art journal based in Switzerland and issued 10 times per year, before moving to Paris, where it was issued quarterly. James A. Fitzsimmons was the magazine's first chief editor and publisher, succeeded in 1987 by Michael Peppiatt.

== History and profile ==
Art International magazine's first volume was published in 1957; the journal, published until 1991, documented international artists and events and had ten issues per volume annually until 1987, at which point it switched to a quarterly release. Volume 5, Part 1 was published between January and March 1961 and it reached Volume 27 Issue 4 in 1984. After changing hands in 1987, it was renumbered Volume 0 Issue 1 and lasted until Issue 14 in 1991. It was first published in Lugano, Switzerland, by the magazine's chief editor, publisher and owner James A. Fitzsimmons, before moving to Paris, France, where it was published by Archive Press.

== See also ==
- List of magazines in Switzerland
- List of art reference books. (Art Journals)
