= American Art Review =

American art magazine

- Editor: Thomas R. Kellaway
- Categories: Art magazine
- Frequency: Quarterly
- Founder: Thomas R. Kellaway
- First issue: September 1973
- Country: United States
- Based in: Stratham, New Hampshire
- Language: English
- Website: amartrevsecure.com
- ISSN: 0092-1327

American Art Review is an art magazine founded and edited by Thomas R. Kellaway who published the magazine from September 1973 until November 1978. In the summer of 1992 he revived the magazine, which is published to this day. Up until 2021, it was published bimonthly. It is currently published quarterly by American Arts Media, Inc., in Leawood, Kansas. Editorial and advertising offices are in Stratham, New Hampshire.

American Art Review concentrates on American art from the colonial era until the early 1970s. It focuses especially on exhibitions of figurative art in regional museums. The content is generally divided between scholarly articles on artists and advertisements from galleries.
