= Moving Art Magazine =

- Editor: Pascal Jover - Debby Zagt
- Categories: Visual arts magazines
- Frequency: 3 issues per year
- Founded: 2007
- Company: Jover Art Promotions
- Country: The Netherlands
- Language: English
- Website: www.movingartmagazine.com

Moving Art Magazine was founded in 2007 in the Netherlands. Moving Art magazine started out as an art magazine, which mainly focused on Dutch and Belgian contemporary art, artists, galleries, auctions, exhibitions and events. In 2010, the magazine would be published in English.
