= Look (Australian magazine) =

Australian art magazine

- Editor: Susannah Smith
- Deputy editor: Emma McLean
- Acting deputy editor: Thomas Sargeant
- Advertising manager: Henna Arcadi
- Categories: Arts, Visual Culture, Lifestyle
- Frequency: Bimonthly
- Circulation: 18,000 to 20,000
- First issue: October 1985; 40 years ago
- Company: Art Gallery of New South Wales
- Country: Australia
- Based in: Sydney
- Language: English
- Website: artgallery.nsw.gov.au/members/become-a-member/member-benefits/look-magazine
- ISSN: 1038-8761 (print); 1039-2289 (web)
- OCLC: 31238618

Look is an art magazine published by the Art Gallery Society of New South Wales in Australia since October 1985. The magazine is delivered to the members of the art gallery and was previously published on a monthly basis. Its frequency switched to bimonthly. The magazine is headquartered in Sydney.
