= Mono.Kultur =

mono.kultur
- Categories: interview magazine, fanzine, independent publishing
- Frequency: Quarterly
- Founder: Kai von Rabenau
- Founded: 2005
- Country: Germany
- Based in: Berlin
- Language: English
- Website: www.mono-kultur.com
- ISSN: 1861-7085

mono.kultur is a quarterly magazine publishing interviews with creatives in the arts and culture in a wider sense.

Each issue features a single in-depth interview and dedicates the entire issue to the interviewee. With this radical focus on only one feature the editorial design adapts to the theme of the interview, the only constant being an unconventional DIN A5-Format.

== History and profile ==
mono.kultur was founded in 2005 in Berlin. The magazine is published in English and distributed worldwide. Founder and publisher is Kai von Rabenau. The editorial team consists of 10 independent editors and 6 more contributing editors.

Klanten, Mollard, and Hübner described mono.kultur in their 2011 book on Self-Publishing Culture: "Incidentally, many of mono.kultur's chosen protagonists are surprised and delighted by the scope and space of the chosen format. For once, they are encouraged to speak out about topics, interest and ideas usually glossed over in targeted lifestyle features, half-hour promo interviews, or narrow specialist publications. Complementing this rich content, the small, beautifully compact magazine is designed by a changing rosting of invitees who spice up the thematic mono.kultur with their own aesthetic interpretation."

== Editorial Design ==
With the ambition to make the editorial design of each issue fit the theme of its interview mono.kultur is renowned for its high standards in design and could attract leading editorial design studios such as Mario Lombardo, Studio 8 or Studio Anti to contribute.

== Publications and Editions ==
Additionally to the quarterly magazine publication mono.kultur has published several publications and editions:

- In 2014 mono.kultur published a poster with artwork by Chris Ware.
- In 2014 mono.kultur published a large format book featuring artist Robert Montgomery.
- In 2011 mono.kultur published issue #26 with Manfred Eicher of ECM Recordings as a free iPad app including interactive features such as sample sounds.
- In 2011 mono.kultur published an edition with a reprint of the original interview with Taryn Simon and ten plates of the artist's ‘A Living Man Declared Dead and Other Chapters’.
- In 2009 mono.kultur published a poster edition in cooperation with Miranda July, the series was reprinted in 2010.
- In 2008 mono.kultur produced a series of T-shirts, scarves and tote bags with original artwork by David Shrigley.

== Magazine Blog - mono.blog ==
Since 2009 the editorial team of mono.kultur publishes a blog they describe as "a rather eclectic summary of the things that are currently on our collective minds".

== Events Series - mono.klub ==
mono.kultur regularly organizes events in and around Berlin. The series was labelled mono.klub and included 46 events ranging from film screenings, lectures, exhibitions as well as club-like parties.

== Recognition ==
In November 2014 the KK gallery in Los Angeles recognized mono.kultur with a retrospective exhibition. In 2010 mono.kultur was nominated as "Magazin of the Year" at the prestigious German LEAD Awards.
