= Reorient =

- Editor: Joobin Bekhrad
- Categories: Art and Culture
- Founder: Joobin Bekhrad
- Founded: 2012
- Final issue: January 2018
- Company: Reorient Media Inc.
- Country: Canada
- Based in: Toronto
- Language: English
- Website: https://www.reorientmag.com

Reorient was a Canadian publication focusing on the art and culture of Iran and the surrounding region. It was founded in 2012 by Joobin Bekhrad who also edited and creatively directed the magazine. The areas covered primarily included visual art, music, literature, and film. The magazine ran until January 2018.

== Profile ==
Reorient has been mentioned and cited in a number of publications and websites from around the world, including Newsweek, The Guardian, Campaign Magazine, The Globe and Mail, Art Dubai, Canvas, Harper’s Bazaar Art Arabia, Oasis, Art & Antiques, the Cairo Review of Global Affairs, and Ryerson Folio.
