= Becky Beasley =

British visual artist

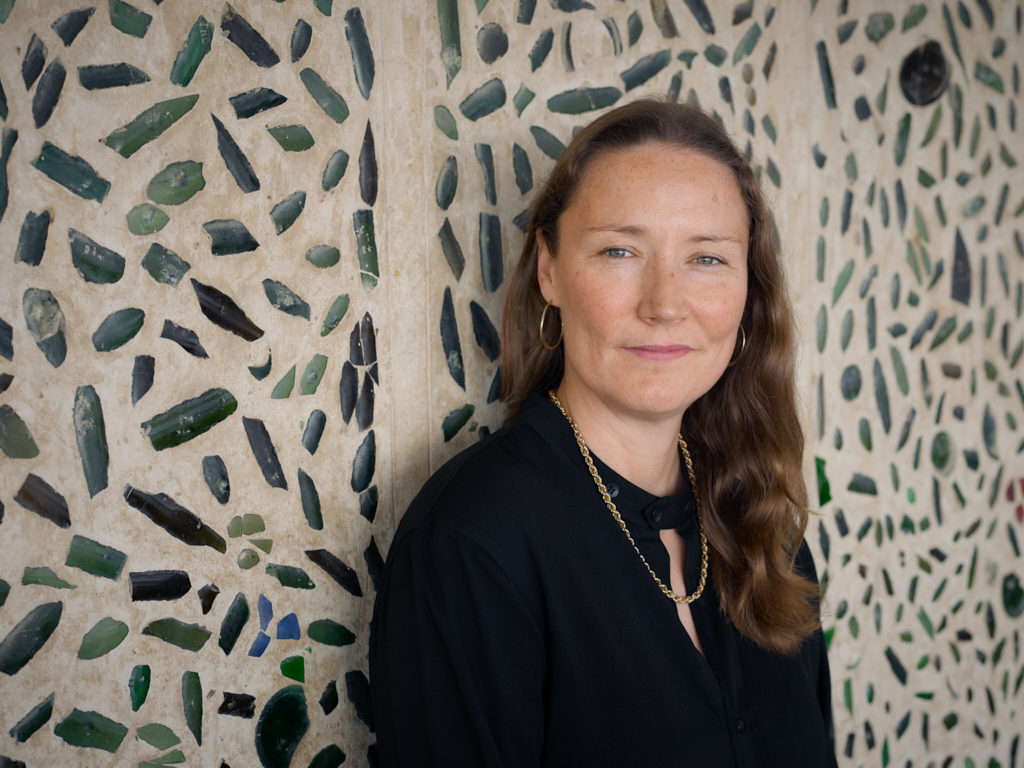
- Born: 1975 (age 50–51); United Kingdom
- Known for: Sculpture, installations, photography
- Website: beckybeasley.com

Becky Beasley (born 1975) is a British visual artist working in sculpture and photography. She is also Professor of Art at Goldsmiths, University of London.

Beasley's work was recognized with a Freelands Award in 2023, for her exhibition at Derby QUAD. She previously received the Paul Hamlyn Award in 2018.

Beasley creates sculptures, photographs, installations and texts rooted in deep literary and historical exploration.

== Selected works ==
=== Solo exhibitions ===
- 2026-7: A Gentle Man (Part II) (1975-2029), Touring QUAD, Derby, Bluecoat, Liverpool, John Hansard Gallery, Southampton
- 2022–1: H.S.P., Galeria Plan B, Berlin, Germany
- 2018: Depressive Alcoholic Mother, Galeria Plan B, Berlin, Germany
- 2018: Late Winter Light, Franscesca Minini Gallery, Milan, Italy
- 2017: Ous, Towner Eastbourne, Eastbourne, UK
- 2017: A Gentle Man, 80WSE Gallery, New York
- 2016: Lake Erie from the Northwest, Laura Bartlett Gallery, London, UK
- 2015: Becky Beasley: Sleep is when you grow, Škuc Gallery, Ljubljana, Slovenia
- 2014: The Walk…in green, Laura Bartlett Gallery, London, UK
- 2014: A Slight Nausea: An Interior, Live Work, South London Gallery, London, UK
- 2013: Spring Rain, Leeds Art Gallery, Leeds, UK
- 2012: Art Now: Becky Beasley, The Outside, Tate Britain, London, UK
- 2011: 8th May 1904, Kingston, Stanley Picker Gallery, Kingston University, London, UK
- 2010: P. A. N. O. R. A. M. A., Office Baroque, Antwerp, Belgium
- 2009: German Soup, Laura Bartlett Gallery, London, UK
- 2008: Malamud, Office Baroque Gallery, Antwerp, Belgium
- 2007: Eleven Years Later, Office Baroque, Antwerp, Belgium
- 2006: Décors du Silence!, Ubu Gallery, Glasgow

=== Group exhibitions ===
- 2026: I want to be more than a lesson you learned
- 2025: Sussex Modernism, Towner Gallery, Eastbourne (Publication, Yale University Press)
- 2024: Intension, Copperfield Gallery, London
- 2024: Intergenerational Forms, Francesca Minini Gallery, Milan
- 2021: Tip of the Iceberg, Focal Point Gallery., Curated by Katharine Stout
- 2021: A Biography of Daphne, Australian Centre for Contemporary Art, Melbourne, AU
- 2020: Transparent Things, Goldsmiths CCA, London, UK
- 2019: Resist (Be Modern Again), John Hansard Gallery, Southampton, UK
- 2018: 25 Years! Shared Histories. Shares Stories, Fotomuseum Winterthur, Winterthur, SW
- 2013: The Narrators, Walker Art Gallery, Liverpool, UK
