= The Drama League =

Theatrical association based in New York City, US

The Drama League is an American arts service organization based in New York City. The organization was founded in 1910 as the Drama League of America, and chapters were established throughout the United States. It is one of the largest organizations in the world creating opportunities for artists who, in whole or in part, identify as directors -- the position offering a coordinated vision to a collective creating works of performance in theater, film, television, immersive, participatory, and other disciplines. Based in New York City, the organization offers fellowships, residencies, assistantships, international exchanges, support services, rehearsal space, and other benefits to directors each year through their umbrella of programs known as The Directors Project.

Its 500+ alumni now direct over 1,100 live theatrical and filmed productions each season on five continents, including on Broadway, Off-Broadway, the West End, and elsewhere. As of 2026, Drama League Alumni have received 10 Tony Awards, 30 Tony Award Nominations, 28 Obie Awards, 7 Lortel Awards, and dozens of Oscar, Emmy, Golden Globe, Peabody, Drama Desk, Outer Critics, Jefferson, Drama-Logue, Helen Hayes, NAACP, GLAAD and Princess Grace nominations and awards, among other honors. Over 100 of them are artistic leaders of theaters and production companies across the United States, Europe, Africa, the Middle East, and Asia.

The organization is also well-known for The Drama League Awards, the oldest theatrical honors in North America. Begun in 1922 and formalized in 1935, The Drama League Awards celebrate achievements on and Off-Broadway with seven competitive awards, for Outstanding Production of a Play, Outstanding Production of a Musical, Outstanding Revival of a Play, Outstanding Revival of a Musical, Outstanding Director of a Play, Outstanding Director of a Musical, and the Distinguished Performance Award. This award, given to one performer each season, can only be won once in an actor's career; its recipients include some of the greatest actors of the last century.

== History ==
The Drama League was founded in Chicago in 1910 as the Drama League of America. The national organization was created with two primary objectives: to influence the professional production of the best plays by alerting members to performances that warranted their support; and to ensure the continuity of professional theatre by educating the audiences of the future. In 1911 the organization being publishing a monthly magazine, The Drama.

By 1926, there were 37 local chapters, or centres, of the Drama League of America. After 17 years of existence, the New York Centre of the organization briefly disbanded, but reorganized in 1928.

In 1934, the League decided to recognize theatrical achievement in a different way. A committee consisting of Broadway producers and other theatre professionals created the first—and still the only—audience-selected award for distinguished performance in a theatrical production.

From 1980 through at least 1987, the League supported new plays with a Special Playwrighting Assistance Award, which gave theaters and playwrights $1,000 grants for new play development.

== Directors Project ==
In the 1980s, The Drama League experienced major transformation. It now also focused its efforts on providing a training program for directors. In 1984 the League initiated a program for young directors that combined training with intensive professional experience for entry-level or early career directors.

The program had three phases:

1. A series of workshops under the guidance of prominent theatre professionals.
2. Assistant directing assignments (one at a regional theatre, one at a New York Theatre).
3. A Production with an Equity cast in New York City.

In 1988, The Directors Project was expanded to include a summer directing program to run in conjunction with the Hangar Theatre in Ithaca, New York. Participants in this program travel to the Hangar, where they each direct a children's show and at least two short plays, and serve as assistant director on a main stage production. The Directors Project also included two other programs, the New Directors/New Works program, and the Assistant Directors program.

Today, The Directors Project includes the Stage Directing Fellowships, FutureNow Fellowships, the Rose Fellowship (in partnership with London's Rose Theatre), the Television and Film Fellowships, the Next Stage Residency, the Beatrice Terry Residency (for women writer/directors), the (Re)Engage Residency (for alumni of their programs), the (Re)Envision Residency, the Irene Gandy Directing Assistantships, and numerous International Exchanges, including a biennial world directing summit. To artists everywhere, they provide reduced-rate rehearsal space in New York City, job referral services, professional development workshops, events, and career strategy counseling.
