= The Drama (magazine) =

American contemporary arts magazine

The Drama was a quarterly arts magazine for contemporary art, design and illustration. It was founded by publisher Joel Speasmaker in 2000 and ran nine issues with the last being published in 2007. Each issue of the magazine revolved around a particular theme or topic. The Drama is notable for being a part of the independent press and DIY movements of the 2000s. The majority of the magazine's readers were individual issue purchasers, with subscription rates for The Drama being 10% in 2005, compared to 50-60% for many mainstream publications. The publishers estimate a readership of 20,000 per issue.

The Drama also ran an online store at thedramastore.org and a series of gallery exhibitions under the moniker 'The Drama Presents'. Both included artwork and merchandise from artists featured in the magazine. Originally, the collective began creating under the umbrella The Drama You've Been Craving and it is unknown when or why the name change occurred.
