= Tatsuo Okada =

Japanese avant garde artist

- 岡田 竜夫
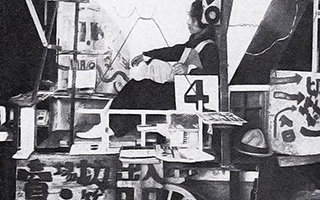
- Tatsuo Okada performing in his work Gate and Moving Ticket-Selling Machine (1925)
- Born: 1900
- Died: 1937 (aged 36–37)
- Known for: Graphic design and typography, performance art
- Style: Experimental
- Movement: Mavo

Tatsuo Okada (岡田竜夫, Okada Tatsuo) (1900–1937) was a Japanese avant garde artist, illustrator, graphic designer, typographer editor and a member of the radical Japanese performance group Mavo.

== Work ==
MAVO 03

Okada is known for his Dada-like performances and for his 1925 installation, Gate and Moving Ticket-Selling Machine, that was exhibited at the Second Sanka Exhibition at the Jichi Kaikan, in Tokyo's Ueno Park.

The installation was part of the Mavo collective's work in the show, and took the form of a peripatetic ticket selling machine-like contraption that was located outside the near the Sanka Tower gate to the exhibition venue. Okada or another performer would periodically pedal it through the exhibit hall while playing music.

Okada explained to the press that the operator inside, who was "perhaps naked", would extend a black-gloved hand pretending to sell tickets. The gizmo was designed such that it had several orientations, sideways or upright. The absurd mechanical contraption had signage that read, "entrance" "Mavo" "ticket selling place" and "exit". There were Mavo magazines for sale that were stacked on shelves on the sides.

== Collections ==
Okada's work is in the collections of the Metropolitan Museum of Art, and the Museum of Fine Art, Boston.
