= Gennifer Weisenfeld =

American art historian

Gennifer S. Weisenfeld

Academic background
- Education: Wesleyan University (BA); Princeton University (MA, PhD)

Academic work
- Discipline: Japan scholar
- Institutions: Duke University

Gennifer Weisenfeld is an American art historian and professor at Duke University. Weisenfeld is a specialist on modern and contemporary Japanese art, visual culture, and design.

== Books ==
- MAVO: Japanese Artists and the Avant-Garde, 1905-1931 (2001)
- Imaging Disaster: Tokyo and the Visual Culture of Japan’s Great Earthquake of 1923 (2012)
- Gas Mask Nation: Visualizing Civil Air Defense in Wartime Japan (2023)
