= Art Dubai =

International Art fair in Dubai, UAE

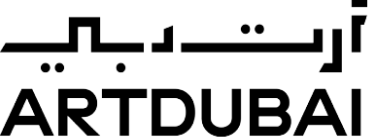
- Art Dubai logo
- Location: Dubai, UAE
- Years active: 2007 to present
- Leader: Ben Floyd (CEO)
- Sponsor: Mohammed bin Rashid Al Maktoum
- Website: https://www.artdubai.ae/

Art Dubai (Arabic: آرت دبي, romanized: Ārt Dubayy) is an international art fair that takes place every March in Dubai. Founded in 2007, Art Dubai is a major platform for art from the Middle East, North Africa and South Asia.

Art Dubai attracted over 30,000 visitors in 2025, including UAE-based, regional and international collectors, curators, patrons, and nearly 100 visiting museums and institutions. The fair's programming includes commissioned artists’ and curators’ projects, residencies, education initiatives and the Global Art Forum.

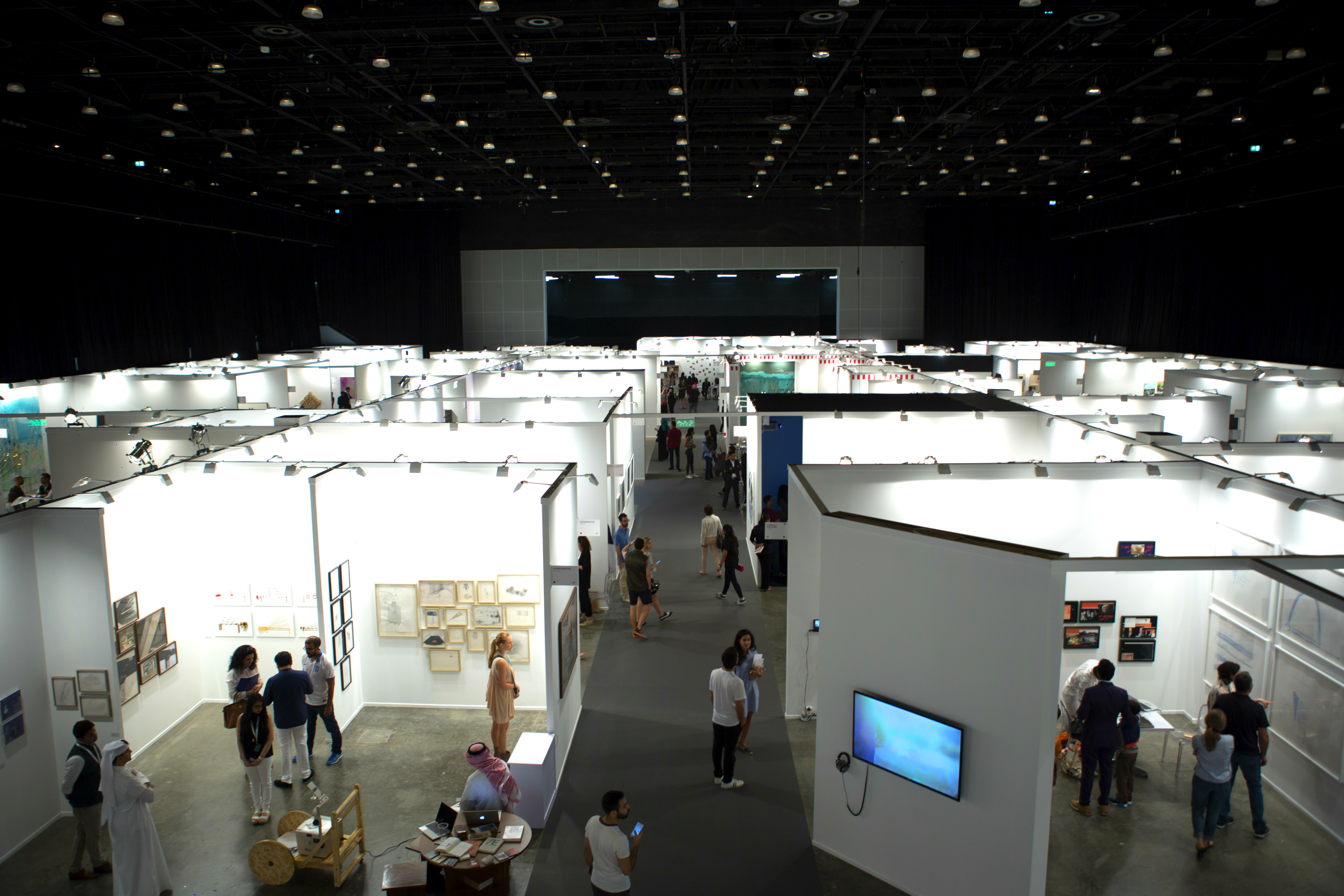
Art Dubai 2016 Gallery Hall 1

Art Dubai is held under the patronage of Sheikh Mohammed bin Rashid Al Maktoum, Vice President and Prime Minister of the UAE and Ruler of Dubai.

The 2020 edition of Art Dubai went digital due to the COVID-19 Pandemic.

== Art Dubai Contemporary ==
Art Dubai Contemporary features commercial galleries operating on the primary market that have been established for at least two years. Around 60 galleries are selected every year for Art Dubai Contemporary, from established galleries to younger art spaces from under-represented art capitals. Likewise, exhibited artists range from emerging practitioners to industry heavyweights. The works presented at the fair cover painting, drawing, sculpture, installation, video, photography and performance.

Art Dubai Contemporary's Selection Committee includes Priyanka Raja (Experimenter, Kolkata), Isabelle van den Eynde (Gallery Isabelle van den Eynde, Dubai), Andrée Sfeir-Semler (Sfeir-Semler Gallery, Hamburg/Beirut) and Ursula Krinzinger (Galerie Krinzinger, Vienna).

== Art Dubai Modern ==
Art Dubai Modern, established in 2014, is devoted to modern art from the Middle East, Africa and South Asia. Each exhibitor presents a solo, two-person or multi-artist show, featuring works by modern art masters of the 20th century, with a focus on work produced between the 1940s and 1980s.

Art Dubai Modern's advisory committee is composed of Dr Nada Shabout, professor of Art History and the coordinator of the Contemporary Arab and Muslim Cultural Studies Initiative (CAMCSI) at the University of North Texas; Dr Iftikhar Dadi, associate professor in Cornell University's Department of History of Art and chair of its Department of Art; Catherine David, deputy director of Musée National d'Art Moderne, Paris; and Vali Mahlouji, curator, director of the Kaveh Golestan Estate, independent advisor to the British Museum and founder of the curatorial think tank Archaeology of the Final Decade.

== Art Dubai Digital ==
The first edition of Art Dubai Digital, curated by Chris Fussner, occurred in 2022 in response to growing recognition of the value of artworks created with digital technology. The second edition in 2023 was curated by Clara Che Wei Peh and the 2024 edition was curated by Auronda Scalera and Alfredo Cramerotti. The 2025 edition was curated by Gonzalo Herrero Delicado under the theme After the Technological Sublime which presented works exploring how artists are using digital mediums to address global pressing issues, with a focus on climate change.

Notable artists that have been exhibited at Art Dubai Digital include Krista Kim, Ouchhh Studio, Primavera De Filippi, Rafael Lozano-Hemmer, Manfred Mohr, Sougwen Chung, Refik Anadol and Jonathan Monaghan.

== Bawwaba ==
Art Dubai 2019 saw the launch of Bawwaba, a unique gallery section, located within the main gallery halls. The section featured projects by individual artists or galleries, located in or focused on the Middle East, Africa, Central and South Asia and Latin America.

The inaugural edition of Bawwaba was curated by French-Cameroonian curator Élise Atangana, and focused on highly conceptual works including videos, installations and murals. The section aims to give visitors a curated reading of the Global South, acting, as its name suggests, as a gateway to current artistic developments from these regions.

== The Global Art Forum ==
The Global Art Forum is the largest annual arts conference in the Middle East and Asia and takes place every year at Art Dubai. The conference features live talks, panel discussions and performances by regional and international thought leaders, artists, curators and writers such as Hans Ulrich Obrist, Michael Stipe and Christo. In 2018, the Global Art Forum was co-directed by Noah Raford and Marlies Wirth with Commissioner Shumon Basar and held under the title 'I Am Not a Robot', focusing on the timely theme of power, paranoia and potentials of automation. The 2019 iteration of Global Art Forum, on the theme "The School is a Factory?", was organized by Commissioner Shumon Basar, with Victoria Camblin and Fawz Kabra as co-directors.

== Education ==
Art Dubai's non-for-profit educational programming, provides programmes for children through to post-graduates. Art Dubai's education initiatives include Campus Art Dubai, a community art school for UAE-based artists, curators, writers, designers and enthusiasts, and Forum Fellows, a fellowship that brings together young curators and writers from the Middle East. The fair also has an internship and volunteer programme.

== Economic impact ==
In March 2016, the fairs’ parent company, Art Dubai Fair FZ LLC (The Art Dubai Group), released the results of an independent survey for Art Week 2015 (March 18–25, 2015). The results show that the total economic impact the Art Dubai and Design Days Dubai events have on the local economy and service sector totaled US$35 million across seven days.
