= Italian robotics =

Robotics in Italy is a high technology area where Italy hosts numerous research centers.

== History ==
The origins of this technology in Italy, but also in the world, which requires knowledge of many sciences to be applied, beginning in the Italian Renaissance with the studies of Leonardo da Vinci.
The first project documented of a robot, in particular of an android, is signed by Leonardo da Vinci in the 1495.

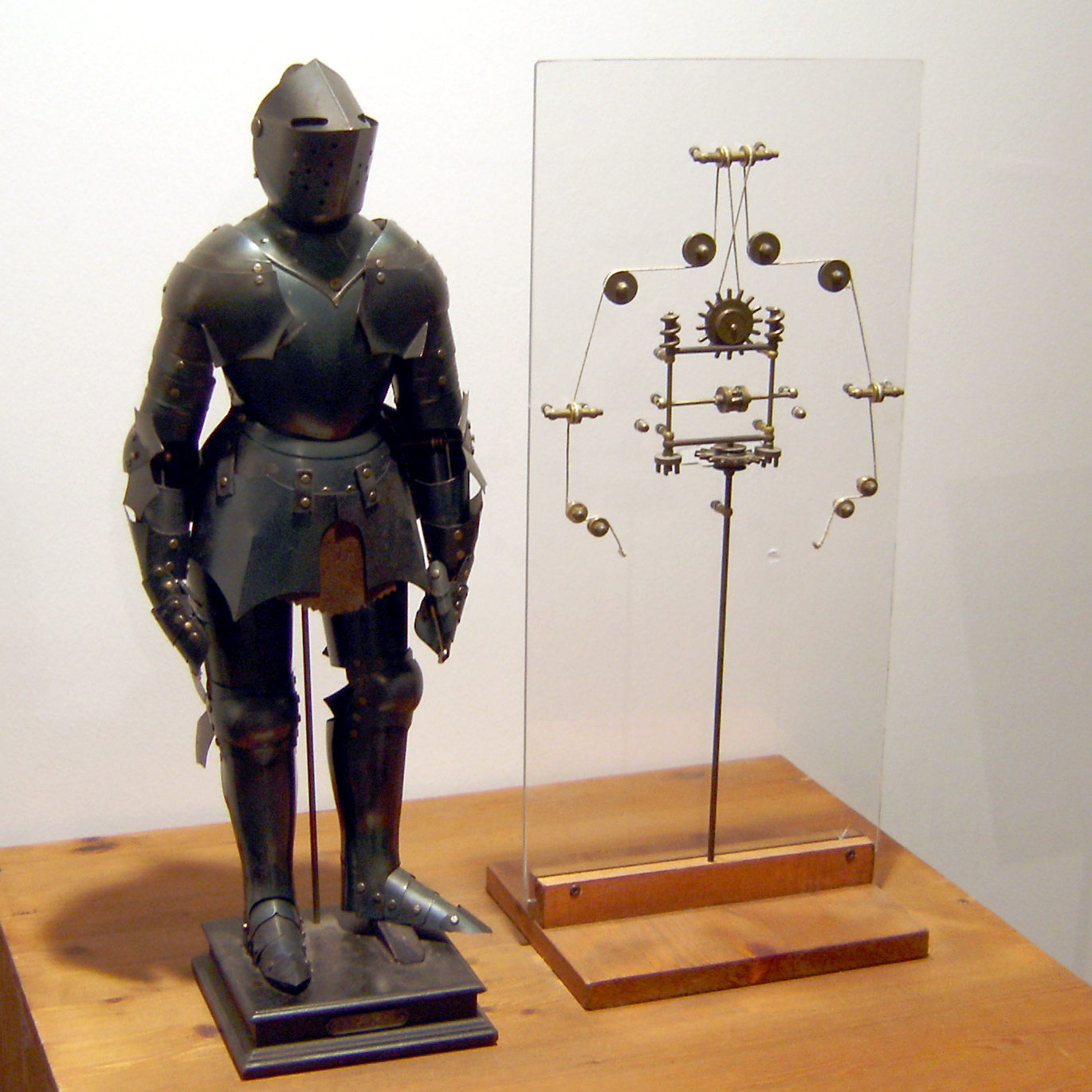
Model of Leonardo da Vinci's robot with inner workings, on display in Berlin

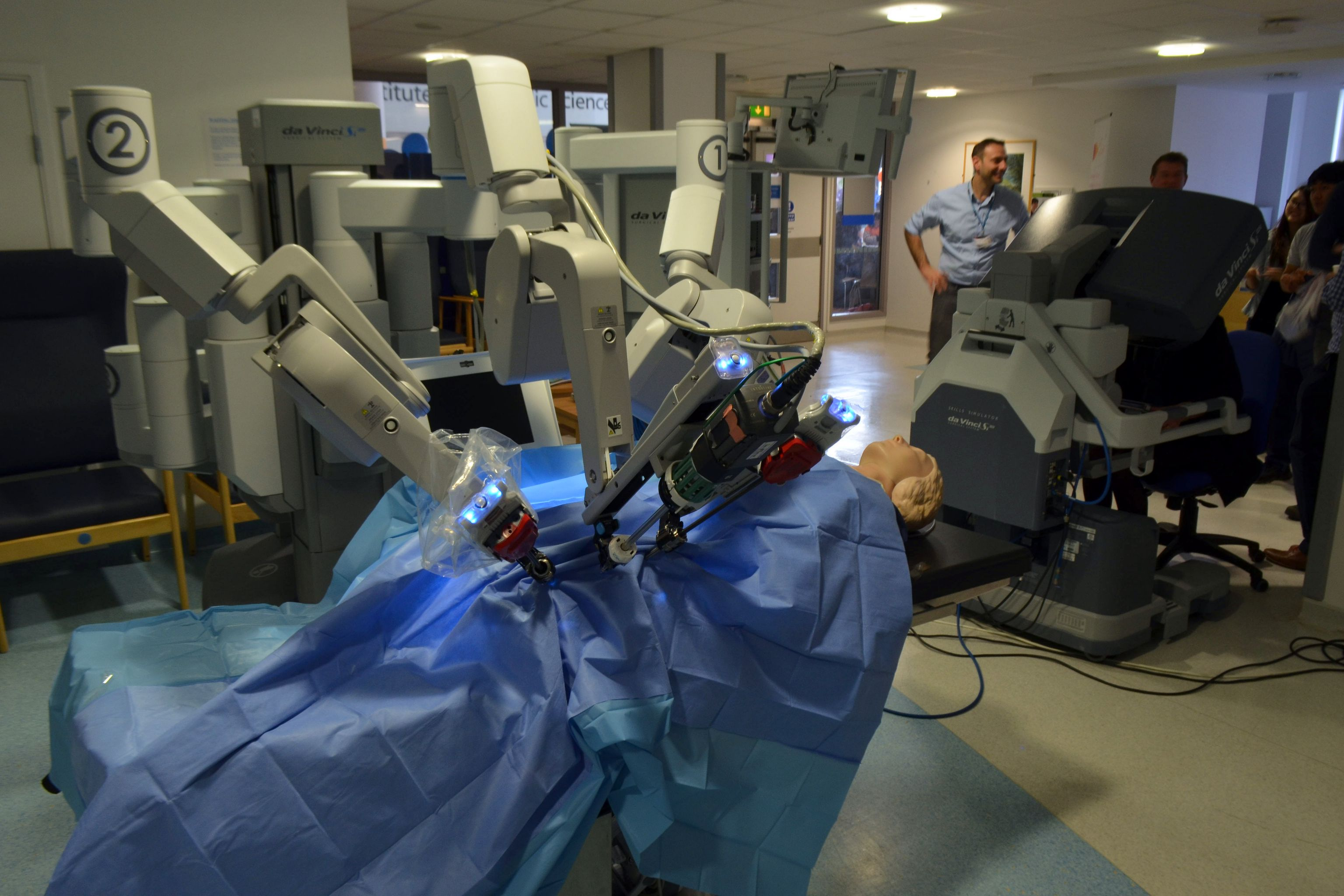
da Vinci Surgical System patient-side component (left) and surgeon console (right)

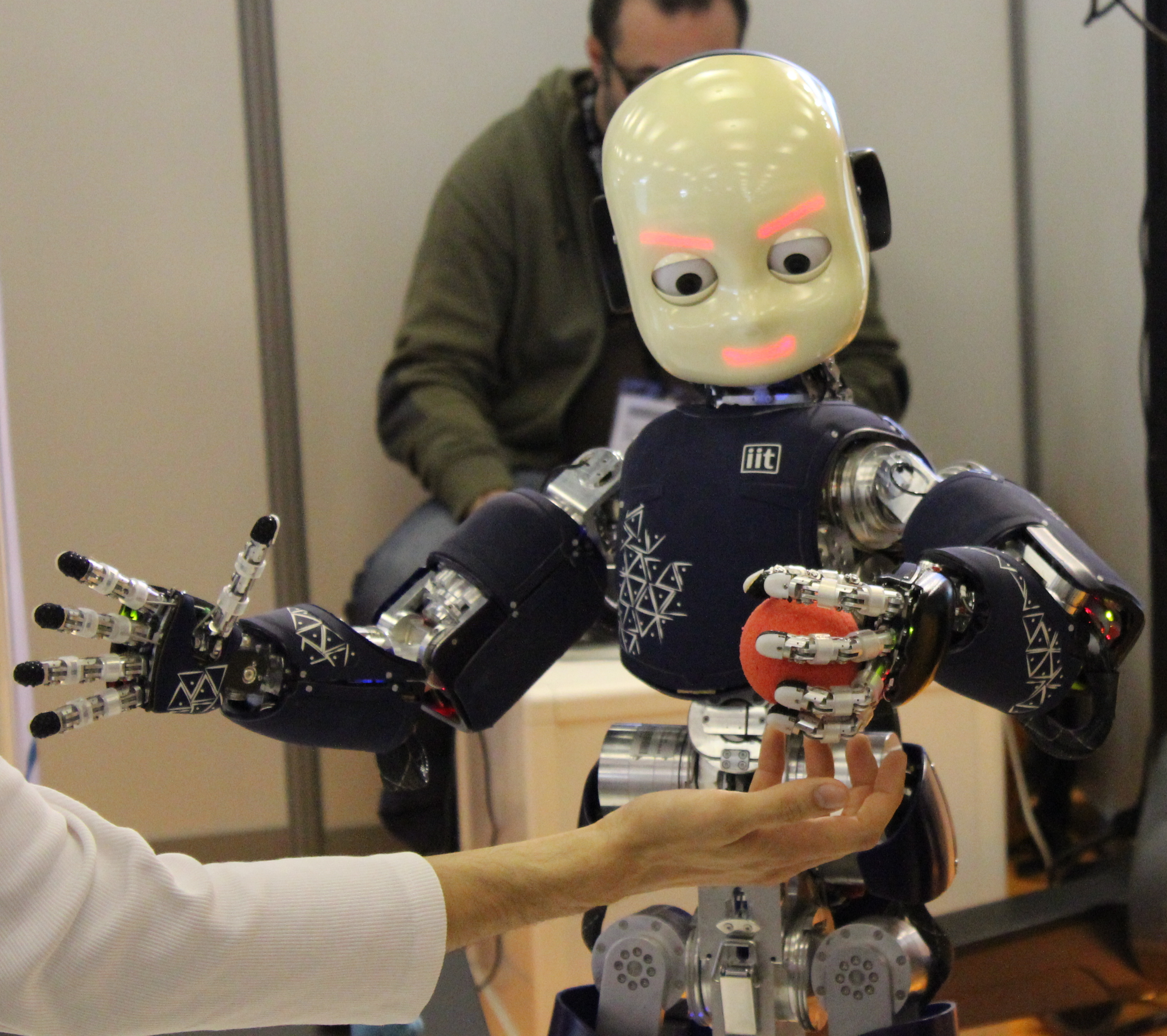
iCub at an exhibition in 2014

== Robotic Surgery ==
Almost all the Italian regions are equipped with robots in the operating room and about 18 thousand robotic surgery operations were carried out in 2017.

"The da Vinci robotic surgery - explains Walter Artibani, Director of the UO of Urology of the Integrated AOU of Verona and Secretary General of the Italian Society of Urology - is emblematic of minimally invasive surgery.

The robot allows a precision not comparable with other techniques and allows to overcome the limits linked to the difficulty of treating pathologies in difficult-to-reach anatomical sites with laparoscopy Italian urology is an excellence in the field of robotics.

In urology the reasons for success are many and simple: the precision of the robot allows greater ease of access to more complex anatomies, a demolithic and reconstructive precision, less blood loss, a reduction in post-operative hospitalization and a reduction in side effects. (erectile dysfunction and incontinence). Added to this are characteristics such as immersive three-dimensional vision able to multiply up to 10 times the normal vision of the human eye.

== Robotic Exoskeleton ==
The Italian Institute of Technology of Genoa started in December 2013 a research program called Robot Rehab that focuses on robotic rehabilitation by developing exoskeletons for the disabled, prosthetic devices and new rehabilitation instruments.
This program is part of an important agreement with INAIL to provide potential applications in the Italian national health system in the short term.

== Robotic Exoskeleton Suit ==
- XoSoft

== Robotic Plant ==
The Plantoid is a machine or a synthetic organism designed to behave, act and grow like a plant. The concept was published for the first time in 2010. A prototype for the European Space Agency is now under development. One of the first prototypes was realized by the Micro-Biorobotics Center of the Italian Institute of Technology in Pontedera in 2015.

== Robotic Runner ==
The Robot R1, the humanoid robot built by Italian Institute of Technology in Genoa.

Sunday, October 14, 2018 at 10, at the start of the "StraGenova del cuore", the non-competitive race dedicated to the memory of the 43 victims of the collapse of Ponte Morandi, there will also be R1, the humanoid robot built by Italian Institute of Technology, in the special role of mascot which will have the task of symbolically giving the start to the race.

== Cyborg in Italy ==
The first experiment in the world, took place in Italy, in 2014 to have installed the bionic hand that perceives the touch was a Danish 36-year-old Dennis Aabo Sørensen.

The bionic hand called LifeHand2 works with a sensitivity similar to the natural one: it is the first time that an artificial limb allows the wearer to perceive and recognize the objects he touches. The result, published in the journal Science Traslational Medicine, is an Italian research project and has origin from a vast international collaboration, coordinated by Silvestro Micera, of the Polytechnic of Lausanne.

The project was developed largely in Italy, by the BioRobotics Institute of the Sant'Anna School of Advanced Studies in Pisa, in collaboration with the German University of Fribourg.

A woman is the first Italian cyborg woman who has been implanted the bionic hand that perceives the contact with objects, made by the group of Silvestro Micera, the Scuola Superiore Sant'Anna and the Polytechnic of Lausanne. The intervention was performed in June 2016 at the Policlinico Gemelli in Rome by the group of neurologist Paolo Maria Rossini. In the experiment, which lasted six months, the bionic hand was implanted to Mrs. Almerina Mascarello, who lives in Veneto and who had lost her left hand in an accident.

== Italian robotics companies ==
=== Industrial robotics ===
- Comau
- Aitonomi

== See also ==
- Android
- Artificial intelligence
- Cyborg
- LifeHand
- iCub
- WALK-MAN
- HyQReal
- CENTAURO
- Istituto Italiano di Tecnologia
- DARPA Robotics Challenge
- Three Laws of Robotics
- Festival internazionale della Robotica
- Industry 4.0
