= Kalup Linzy =

American performance artist (born 1977)

Artist Kalup Linzy
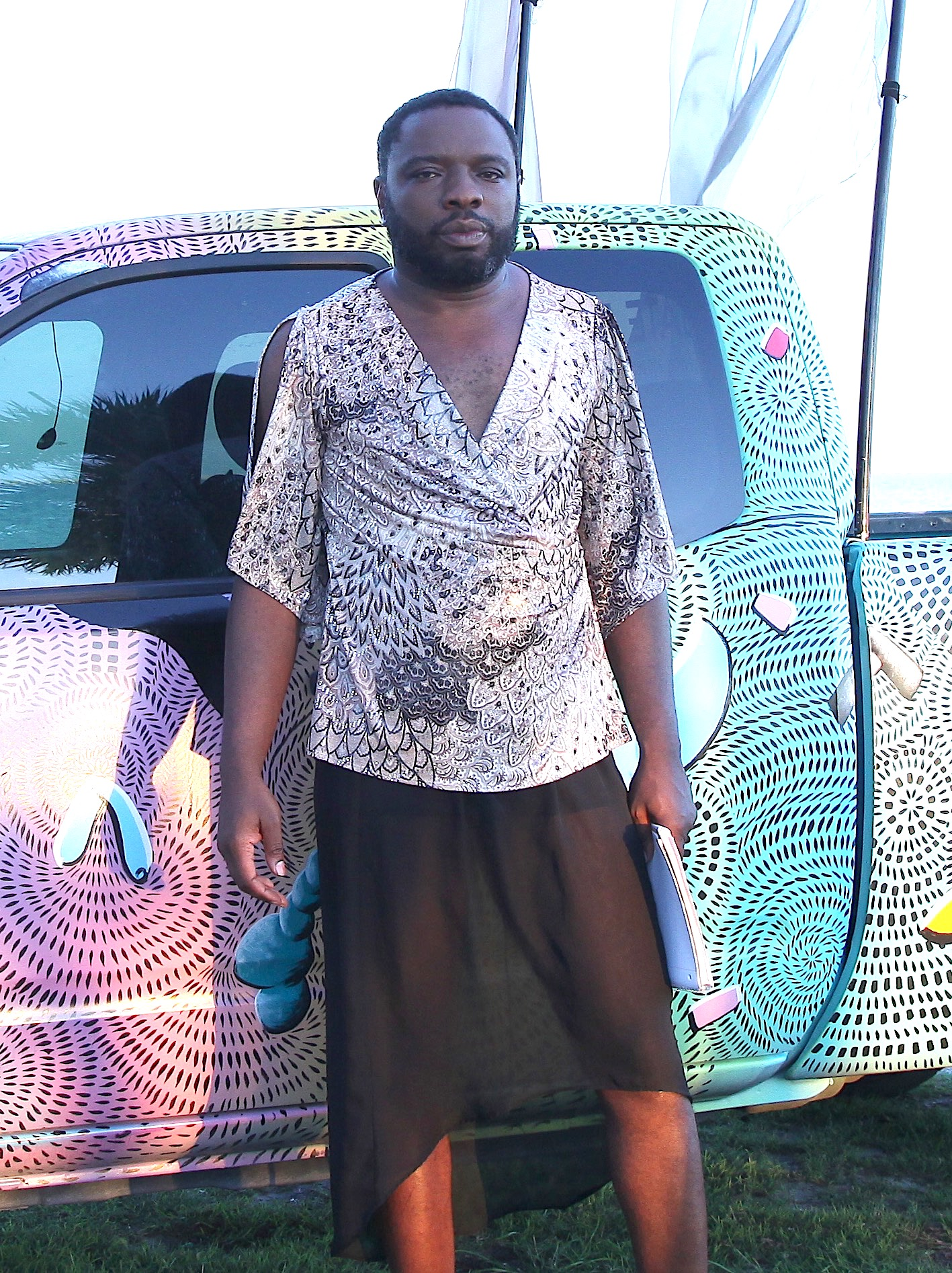
- Born: July 23, 1977 (age 49); Clermont, Florida
- Education: University of South Florida
- Website: https://kaluplinzystudio.com

Kalup Linzy (born July 23, 1977) is an American video and performance artist who currently lives and works in Tulsa, OK. His performances are characterized by their low-tech quality and themes of community, socializing, family, the church, and sexuality.

== Personal life ==
Linzy was born in Clermont, Florida, to the late Samuel Avant, Sr., who was a farmer, and Constance Linzy, who struggled with schizophrenia and later drug addiction. Linzy was raised in Stuckey, Florida, in a close-knit rural community by his late grandmother Georgianna Linzy, a seamstress, who was also deaf, and also by his aunt Diane McMullen, an evangelist and domestic worker, and his uncle Isaiah McMullen, who was a minister, and is retired from the railroad. Linzy spent weekends and summers with his father, who lived a few miles away in Center Hill, Florida. He has a sister, Athia Linzy-Isom, who was born to the same parentage, five half-brothers and a step-sister by his father. Kalup also considers his aunt and uncle's six children to be his siblings.

While he was growing up, his mother was in and out of mental facilities and his father became paralyzed after suffering a stroke. This affected Linzy emotionally. He also secretly struggled with his sexuality and only revealed it to close relatives and friends who asked.

== Education ==
Linzy attended South Lake High School in Groveland, Florida, where he ran track and was involved in many student organizations including the Student Government, where he served as President his senior year, Future Homemakers of America, where he served as a state officer, and Future Business Leaders of America. Linzy's performance and creative skills were nurtured in chorus, theatre, and the church choir. His relatives taught him how to play the piano by ear. In his senior year, Linzy was named a Walt Disney Dreamer and Doer, a special recognition for Central Florida students where he represented his county. In 1995, following High School, he enrolled at the University of South Florida where he obtained his Bachelor of Arts degree in 2000. As an undergraduate, he pursued his degree in the arts and started a community festival with one of his childhood friends. He then followed that with a MFA from the same school University of South Florida in 2003.

== Career ==
Linzy has described his childhood and place of upbringing has thematically influential for his well-known video and performance work. For example, Linzy has produced a series of soap opera video works, and has described soap operas as having been a key social component for his family and community. He has said that shows such as Guiding Light were a part of daily life when he was growing up, and he often includes soap opera stereotypes in the characters and plot of his videos. His soap opera videos can be characterized by their low-tech quality, themes of community, socializing, family, the church, sexuality and homosexuality.

He would eventually explore sexuality, along with race, gender, stereotypes, and cultural identities, in his art. Linzy pushes the boundaries of gender in his work through dressing himself and other characters in drag, using pre-recorded voices or manipulating voice through video editing, and playing with different dialects. The soap opera character maps are extensive and he charts family trees and detailed personas to bring them to life. He also uses friends with little or no acting experience for some parts. In addition to video work, Linzy performs on stage, writes songs, and collaborates with other artists.

In 2003, he moved to New York City to pursue a career in the arts. In 2005, his participation in a group show at The Studio Museum in Harlem and a project at Taxter and Spengemann Gallery in Chelsea, led to a review in The New York Times by Holland Cotter that opened with the statement "A star is born...". Linzy went on to receive numerous awards, recognition, and opportunities. He has been honored with awards and grants include The Louis Comfort Tiffany Foundation grant, the John Simon Guggenheim Memorial Foundation Fellowship, a Creative Capital Award, an Art Matters grant, The Jerome Foundation grant, The Harpo Foundation grant, and The Headlands Alumni Award residency. His work is included in many private and public collections. Among them are The Museum of Modern Art, The Studio Museum in Harlem, The Whitney Museum of American Art, The Metropolitan Museum of Art, The Birmingham Museum of Art, The Rubell Family Collection and the collection of Martin and Rebecca Eisenberg. He has lectured at universities and colleges across the country including New York University and Harvard University.

Linzy has worked and collaborated with many well known artists, celebrities, and fashion designers. Among them are James Franco, Chloë Sevigny, Natasha Lyonne, Liya Kebede, Leo Fitzpatrick, James Ransone, Dan Colen, Nate Lowman, Diane von Furstenberg, Proenza Schouler, Michael Stipe, Tunde Adebimpe and the band TV on the Radio. His work has been featured at numerous film festivals that include Sundance Film Festival, Tribeca Film Festival, London Lesbian and Gay Film Festival, and Outfest. He has also been featured in numerous magazines including New York Magazine, V, W, Out, Interview, which featured an interview with his friend Chan Marshall, Artillery Magazine, in which he was the cover story, and in May 2014 he was featured in a six-page spread in Harper's Bazaar, Hong Kong.

In 2010, he was invited by and featured on General Hospital alongside James Franco playing Kalup Ishmael. He performed Route 66 (song). In the summer of 2011, Linzy produced the video and performed in A Heavenly Act, an opera by Italian composer Luciano Chessa commissioned by SFMOMA with a libretto by Gertrude Stein. A Heavenly Act premiered on August 19, 2011, at the Yerba Buena Center for the Arts in San Francisco, in a staged production by the Ensemble Parallèle. In 2012, while teaching a performance studies course at New York University, Linzy appeared with butoh artist Edoheart in an art reality show.

Linzy's work was featured in the 2016 Atlanta Biennial curated by Daniel Fuller, Victoria Camblin, Aaron Levi Garvey, and Gia Hamilton. In 2021, Linzy's film OK was an official selection of both the Circle Cinema Film Festival and the Video Art and Experimentation Festival where it was part of the Beauty, Sex and Shame program.

== Exhibitions ==
=== Solo ===
- Le Petit Versailles, East Village, NY (2004)
- Kalup Linzy and Charles Nelson, Romo Gallery, Atlanta, GA (2005)
- All My Churen, LAXART, Los Angeles, CA (2006)
- Kalup Linzy, P.S. 1 Contemporary Art Center, Long Island City, New York (2006)
- Taxter & Spengemann, New York (2006)

=== Group ===
- Sunday in the Arts, Scarfone/Hartley Gallery, Tampa, FL (2002).
- All Together Now, Rush Arts Gallery, New York, NY (2003)
- Faith, Champion Fine Art, Culver City, CA (2004)
- Mommy! I'm! Not! An! Animal!, Capsule Gallery, New York, NY (2004)
- African Queen, Studio Museum in Harlem, New York, NY (2005)
- Frequency, Studio Museum in Harlem, New York, NY (2005)
- Do You Think I'm Disco, Longwood Art Gallery, Bronx, NY (2006)
- Masquerade: Representation and the Self in Contemporary Art, Museum of Contemporary Art, Sydney, Australia (2006)
- Black Alphabet, Zacheta National Gallery of Art, Warsaw, Poland (2006)
- Empathetic, Temple Gallery, Tyler School of Art, Philadelphia, PA (2006)
- AFI FEST 2006, Los Angeles, CA
- Vocal Verbal, Studentski Center, Zegreb, Croatia (2007)
- Uncertain States of America - American Video Art in the 3rd Millennium, Moscow Biennial, Moscow, Russia (2007)
- Spotlight Film and Video Series, Madison Museum of Contemporary Art, Madison, Wisconsin (2007)
- Prospect.1, New Orleans (2008)
- Project G.O.A.T., Tampa, FL (2021)

=== Videography ===
- Julietta Calls Ramone (2002)
- Ramone Calls Julietta Again: Booty Call (2002)
- Ride to da Club (2002)
- Conversations wit de Churen II: All My Churen (2005)
- Conversations wit de Churen III: Da Young & Da Mess (2005)
- Conversations wit de Churen IV: Play Wit De Churen (2005)
- KK Queens Survey (2005)
- Conversations wit de Churen V: As da Art World Might Turn (2006)
- Lollypop (2006)
- Melody Set Me Free (2007)
- Pursuit of Gay (Happyness) (2007)
- That's Wassup (2007)
- Keys to Our Heart (2008)
- SweetBerry Sonnet (Remixed) (2008)
- OK (2021)

=== Discography ===
- 2011: Turn It Up (feat. James Franco) - EP
- 2012: Labisha the Diva (Tracks from Melody Set Me Free On Rabbit.TV) - EP
- 2013: Romantic Loner EP - Single
- 2013: Romantic Loner - Full Album
- 2014: Art Jobs and Lullabies - Full Album
- 2017: Tangled Up - Full Album
