= Primavera De Filippi =

French legal scholar and Internet activist

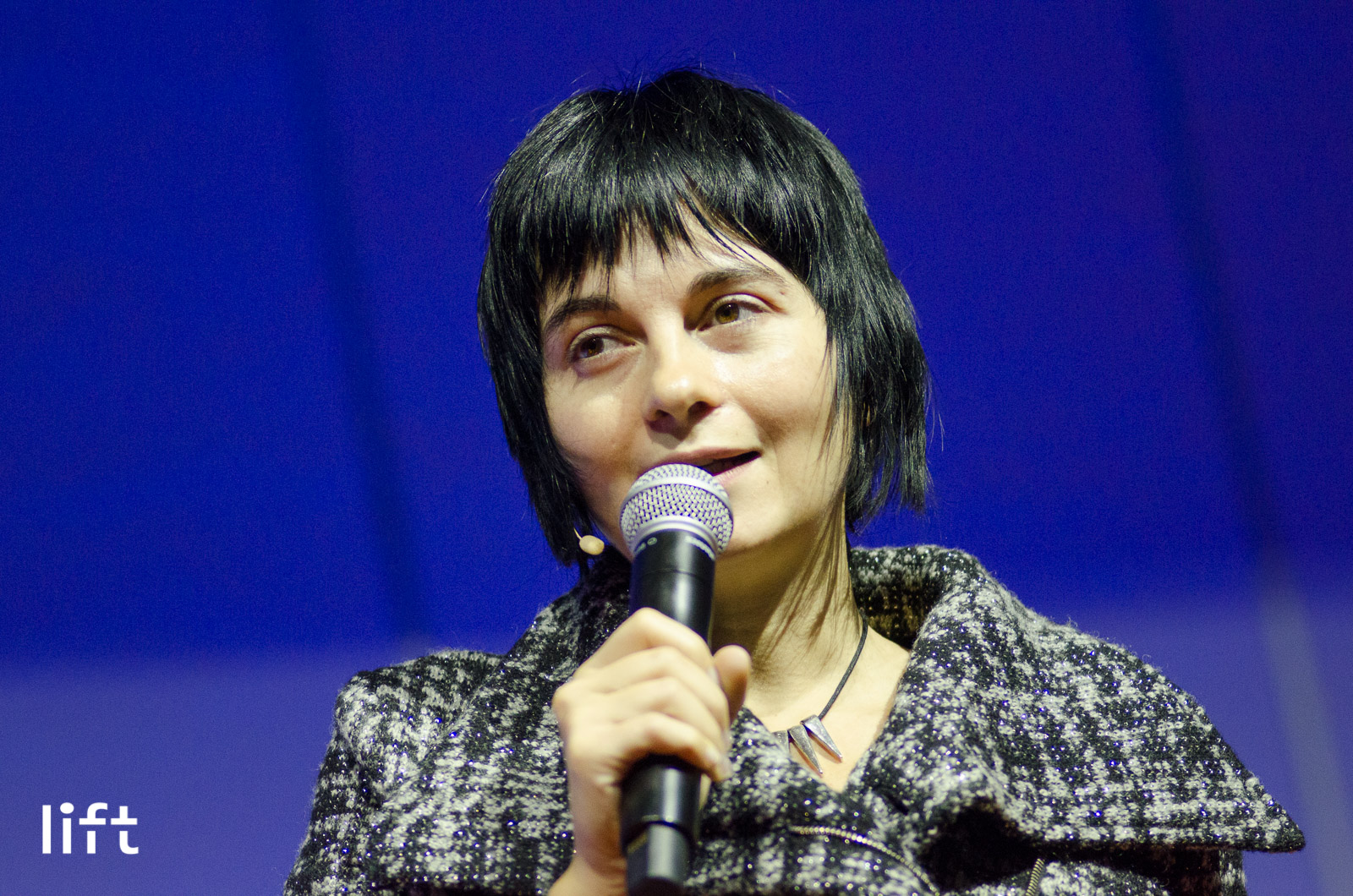
- Education: Bocconi University, Queen Mary University of London, European University Institute
- Known for: Blockchain and the Law
- Awards: Triple Canopy, ERC Grant
- Scientific career
- Fields: Blockchain, Commons, Peer-to-peer, Copyright Law
- Workplaces: CNRS, Berkman Klein Center for Internet & Society (Harvard University)
- Doctoral advisor: Giovanni Sartor

Primavera De Filippi is a French legal scholar, Internet activist and artist, whose work focuses on the blockchain, peer production communities and copyright law. She is a permanent researcher at the CNRS and Faculty Associate at the Berkman Klein Center for Internet & Society at Harvard University. She is the author of the book Blockchain and the Law published by Harvard University Press. As an activist, she is a part of Creative Commons, the Open Knowledge Foundation and the P2P Foundation, among others.

== Education ==
Her interdisciplinary background is grounded in a wide range of academic studies. She holds an undergrad and Masters studies in Economics and Management (Bocconi University, Milan), a Masters in Intellectual Property (Queen Mary University of London), and a PhD in law (European University Institute, Florence).

In her PhD thesis, she explored the legal challenges of copyright law in the digital environment, with special attention to the mechanisms of private ordering (e.g. Digital Rights Management systems, Creative Commons licenses).

== Career ==
During her PhD (2006–2010) at the European University Institute, she was visiting scholar in both the University of Buffalo (New York) working with Barry Smith, and the University of California at Berkeley working with Molly Shaffer Van Houweling.

In 2010, she joined the Centre for Administrative Science Research (CERSA) at CNRS and Universite de Paris II, working with Danièle Bourcier. She has been affiliated with the center since then, first as postdoctoral researcher, and since 2017 as a permanent researcher.

In 2013, she became a fellow of the Berkman Center for Internet and Society (Harvard University), and during two years she researched there the concept of "governance by design" and its relation with cloud computing and peer-to-peer technologies. In 2015, she was promoted to the role of faculty associate at the center, which she holds nowadays.

She has held status of visiting researcher in several institutions: in 2014, in the Institute for Technology & Society of Rio de Janeiro, and in 2017 in both the WZB Berlin Social Science Center and the European University Institute. She was also one of the leading researchers in P2Pvalue, the leading European project on Commons-based peer production, and is part of the editorial board of several journals, including: Digital Finance (Springer), Frontiers in Human Dynamics and the Journal of Open Hardware

In 2019, she received an ERC grant with the project "BlockchainGov" to research blockchain governance.

== Activism and art ==
=== Activism ===
Beyond her academic work, De Filippi has engaged in several activist and practitioner activities promoting the expansion of openness, democratic governance, peer-to-peer, or blockchain. In 2010, she joined the Open Knowledge Foundation as the coordinator of the public domain working group, through which she actively contributed to the making of the Public Domain Calculators. In 2012, she co-established the French chapter of the Open Knowledge Foundation. Since 2011, she has been co-founder of the International Communia Association for the promotion and the preservation of the digital public domain, and legal expert for Creative Commons France. Since 2016, she joined the advisory board of the P2P Foundation. In the frame of the Internet Governance Forum, she has co-founded the dynamic coalitions on platform responsibility, network neutrality and blockchain technology.

=== Art and journalism ===
De Filippi has been also a reputed artist, combining several forms of art with concepts around free culture and blockchain. Her latest and most popular works revolve around the plantoid, a "blockchain-based life form". She has also written Op'Eds in mainstream media such as Harvard Business Review, Wired or Vice's Motherboard.

== Work ==
She has published more than 70 papers in the topics of blockchain, commons, cloud computing, peer-to-peer technologies and copyright law. Her works on the interactions of blockchain and law are regarded as substantially relevant in the young field of blockchain. In fact, her book Blockchain and the Law (Harvard University Press) was considered "an important new book" and a "deeply-researched book that can be expected to show up on law school syllabi for years to come" by Fortune, and was valued as a critical lens in The New York Times Book Review. Her research in blockchain is often considered a reference on the field by popular media, such as Forbes, Al Jazeera, Le Point, or France 24. She is also one of the 25 leading figures on the Information and Democracy Commission launched by Reporters Without Borders.

=== Scientific and social recognitions ===
- Fortune 40 under 40 on fintech
- Member of the Global Future Council on Blockchain Technologies at the World Economic Forum
- TEDx Cambridge speaker
- Commission recipient by Triple Canopy

== Selected works ==
- De Filippi, P., Wright, A. (2018) Blockchain and the Law: The Rule of Code. Harvard University Press
- Davidson, S., De Filippi, P., & Potts, J. (2018). Blockchains and the economic institutions of capitalism. Journal of Institutional Economics, 14(4), 639–658.
- De Filippi, P. & Loveluck, B. (2016). The invisible politics of Bitcoin: governance crisis of a decentralized infrastructure. Internet Policy Review, Vol. 5, Issue 4.
- De Filippi, P. & Hassan, S. (2016). Blockchain Technology as a Regulatory Technology: From Code is Law to Law is Code. First Monday, Vol. 21, Number 12.
- De Filippi, P., (2016). The interplay between decentralization and privacy: the case of blockchain technologies, Journal of Peer Production, Issue n.7
- De Filippi, P. (2014). Bitcoin: a regulatory nightmare to a libertarian dream. Internet Policy Review, 3(2).

== See also ==
- Plantoid
