= Stefano Mancuso =

Italian botanist

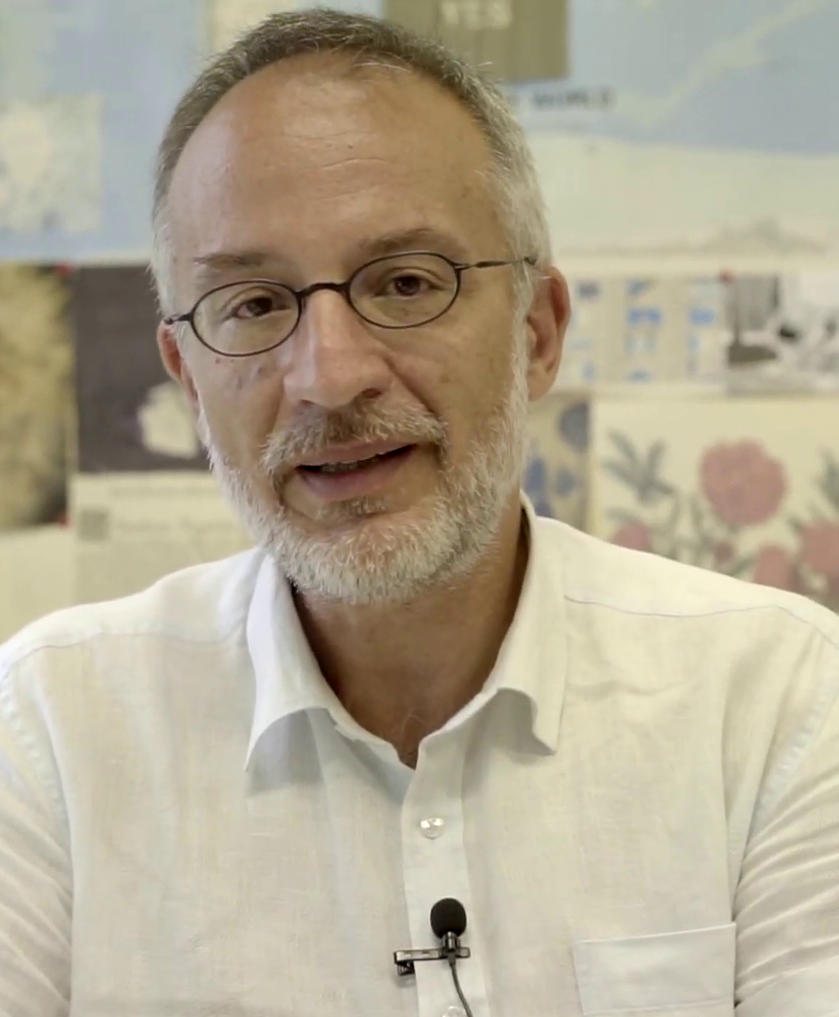
- Born: Stefano Mancuso; 9 May 1965; Catanzaro, Italy
- Education: University of Florence
- Awards: Premio Nazionale di Divulgazione (2013); Award of the Austrian Ministry of Research and Economy for the Book of the Year (2016); Premio Galileo per la divulgazione scientifica (2018); Tignano festival award (2019)
- Scientific career
- Fields: Botany; Plant physiology; Plant perception

Stefano Mancuso (born 9 May 1965) is an Italian botanist and writer, best known for his research on plant intelligence. He is professor of the Agriculture, Food, Environment and Forestry department at his alma mater, the University of Florence. He is the director of the International Laboratory of Plant Neurobiology, steering committee member of the Society of Plant Signaling and Behavior, editor-in-chief of the Plant Signaling & Behavior journal and a member of the Accademia dei Georgofili.

== Biography ==
Mancuso developed an interest in the research of plants during his university studies. Since 2001, he has been a professor at the University of Florence, and in 2005 he founded the International Laboratory of Plant Neurobiology, designed to study physiology, behavior, molecular biology, intelligence, and other fields of plant science.

== Research ==
=== Root system of plants ===
Mancuso studied the abilities of plants and their root system (in particular, the tips of the roots, which are very sensitive to various types of stimuli, such as pressure, temperature, certain sounds, humidity, and damage). According to an article published in 2004 by a group of botanists (which included Mancuso), the areas of the root apices interact with each other, forming a structure whose functions they proposed to be similar to the functions of an animal's brain.

=== Plant perception ===
Mancuso concluded that in the course of evolution, plants had to work out solutions to the problems inherent in organisms attached to a substrate. Although plants have neither nerves nor a brain, they have a social life and, therefore, analogues of the sensory organs, though very different from those in animals. He considers the key to understanding this can be found in some cells (gametes and bacteria), corals, sponges, and in the behaviour of organisms such as placozoa. In 2012, Mancuso and his colleagues found that plants have receptors that make their roots sensitive to sound and the direction of its distribution. Other biologists four years prior claimed that trees in conditions of acute water shortage can emit sounds which can be more than just passive signs of cavitation.

Phytoplankton and terrestrial plants have certain abilities for the perception of light. Mancuso and his colleagues showed that in the laboratory arabidopsis the root apices are very sensitive to light (a few seconds of illumination are enough to cause an immediate and strong reaction of the molecules of the ROS). These phenomena complemented earlier observations and studies of living roots made using confocal microscopy.

His book Plant revolution: le piante hanno già inventato il nostro futuro, describes his view of how plants have found and tested "brilliant" solutions to the various problems that humanity faces today for hundreds of millions of years. Plants, partly due to symbiosis with bacteria and fungi, "invented" well-optimized and stable methods of colonizing the earth's surface and then the lower atmosphere. Plants also created one of the most important carbon sinks on our planet, and launched the production of clean energy from starch, sucrose, sclerenchyma and complex biomolecules through photosynthetic chlorophyll, biodegradability according to the principles of a circular economy.

According to Mancuso, since the beginning of the 1990s, some scientists began to recognize that plants have not only the ability to communicate with each other, but also their own form of intelligence.

=== Plants and animals ===
Mancuso notes that vascular plants have an analogue of the circulatory system, consisting of several organs (in particular reproductive organs), but that, unlike highly organized animals, plants have receptors distributed throughout the body, while animals have receptors concentrated in specific organs such as eyes, ears, skin, and tongue. The reproductive organs of plants are diverse in principle of their functioning, while in animals, they are more unified. According to Mancuso, this suggests that the plants "smell", "listen", "communicate" (between individuals of the same species, and sometimes with other species) and "learn" (through a certain form of memory, including the memory of their immune system), using their entire modular organism (which allows plants to resist both predatory and herbivorous animals better). Mancuso often refers to lima bean as an example, which, when attacked by red spider mite (lat. tetranychus urticae), releases a complex of molecules into the air that can attract phytoseiulus persimilis, carnivorous mites that are ready to consume colonies of the red spider mites. Mancuso and his colleagues emphasized the role of auxins, which function as neurotransmitters, similar to those found in animals.

Plants are able to synthesize molecules that play a role similar to animal neurons, in particular synaptotagmins and monosodium glutamate. Plants can carry out the biosynthesis of molecules that are supposed to be homologous to molecules that perform important functions in animals (for example, molecules that activate immunophilins that perform immune and hormonal functions in animals, in particular, signalling of steroid and neurological hormones). Cytology confirms the existence of plant cells behaving as synapses. In 2005, Mancuso, together with several biochemists, developed a "non-invasive" microelectrode based on carbon nanotube technology for measuring and fixing the flow of information that can circulate in plants.

=== Plant intelligence ===
Mancuso notes that for a very long time, intelligence was mistakenly considered by many people to be "what distinguishes us from other living beings," but if we consider intelligence as the ability to solve and overcome problems, we have to recognize that plants possess it, and it is intelligence that allows plants to develop and respond to most of the problems that they encounter throughout their ontogenesis.

Thus, plants adapt to life in almost all sufficiently lit terrestrial and aquatic environments, encountering both herbivores and predatory insects and animals. Although plants do not have a specific organ comparable to the brain, they use the equivalent of the so-called "Diffuse brain" (it. "Cervello diffuso"). Some plants, for example, are capable of secreting substances that attract insects and animals that plants use for their own needs. Chemicals synthesized by plants often have a very complex effect on the behaviour of animals and insects (an example is the mutually beneficial relationship of myrmecophytes and ants, in particular the phenomenon of the devil's garden in Amazonian forests).

Mancuso has also advocated for bacterial intelligence. He has controversially argued that plants have consciousness. This idea is rejected by the majority of plant scientists as plants do not possess a brain or neurons.

== Professional activities ==
In 2010, Mancuso gave a lecture in Oxford on the movement of roots in the soil: how they look for water, nutrients and capture new spaces. Mancuso was also an invited speaker at the TED Global conference in the same year.

In 2012, in the Plantoid project, he took part in the creation of a "bio-inspired" robot that imitated certain natural properties of the roots, and could, for example, explore an area that is difficult to access or contaminated as a result of a nuclear accident or the use of bacteriological weapons. The Plantoid project is still developing for the European Commission by consortium of the scientists including Mancuso.

In 2013, with co-author Alessandra Viola, he published the book Verde brillante: Sensibilità e intelligenza del mondo vegetale.

In 2014, at the University of Florence, Mancuso created a startup specializing in plant biomimetics and an autonomous floating greenhouse, which was offered for mass production to the Chilean government in 2016.

In 2017, he published Plant revolution: le piante hanno già inventato il nostro futuro. The English translation of the book, The Revolutionary Genius of Plants: A New Understanding of Plant Intelligence and Behavior, was written by Vanessa Di Stefano.

== Awards ==
- it:Premio Nazionale di Divulgazione - National Award for Scientific Dissemination, 2013
- Award of the Austrian Ministry of Research and Economy for the Book of the Year, 2016
- it:Premio letterario Galileo per la divulgazione scientifica — "Plant revolution: le piante hanno già inventato il nostro futuro" book, 21 May 2018
- Environmental award on the Tignano festival, 18 July 2019

== Scientific work ==
=== Publications ===
- Baluška, F., Volkmann, D., Hlavacka, A., Mancuso, S., & Barlow, P. W. (2006). Neurobiological view of plants and their body plan. In Communication in plants (pp. 19–35). Springer, Berlin, Heidelberg.
- Brenner, E. D., Stahlberg, R., Mancuso, S., Vivanco, J., Baluška, F., & Van Volkenburgh, E. (2006). Plant neurobiology: an integrated view of plant signaling. Trends in plant science, 11(8), 413–419.
- Gagliano, M., Mancuso, S., & Robert, D. (2012). Towards understanding plant bioacoustics. Trends in plant science, 17(6), 323–325.
- Gagliano M, Renton M, Duvdevani N, Timmins M & Mancuso S (2012) Out of sight but not out of mind: alternative means of communication in plants. PLoS One, 7(5), e37382.
- Mancuso, S. (Ed.). (2011). Measuring roots: an updated approach. Springer Science & Business Media.
- Mancuso, S., & Viola, A. (2015). Brilliant Green: The Surprising History and Science of Plant Intelligence. Island Press. Translation by Joan Benham of Verde brillante: Sensibilità e intelligenza del mondo vegetale; foreword by Michael Pollan.
- Santelia, D., Vincenzetti, V., Azzarello, E., Bovet, L., Fukao, Y., Düchtig, P., ... & Geisler, M. (2005). MDR‐like ABC transporter AtPGP4 is involved in auxin‐mediated lateral root and root hair development. FEBS letters, 579(24), 5399–5406.
- Schapire, A. L., Voigt, B., Jasik, J., Rosado, A., Lopez-Cobollo, R., Menzel, D., ... & Botella, M. A. (2008) Arabidopsis synaptotagmin 1 is required for the maintenance of plasma membrane integrity and cell viability. The Plant Cell, 20(12), 3374–3388.

=== Essays ===
- La pianta del mondo, Laterza, 2020
- La nazione delle piante, Laterza, 2019
- L’incredibile viaggio delle piante, Laterza, 2018
- Plant revolution, Giunti editore, 2017
- Botanica. Viaggio nell’universo vegetale, Aboca edizioni, 2017
- Verde brillante, sensibilità e intelligenza del mondo vegetale, con Alessandra Viola, Giunti editore, 2013
- Biodiversi, con Carlo Petrini, Slow Foof, 2015
- Uomini che amano le piante, Giunti editore, 2014

== See also ==
- Jellyfish Barge
