= Jellyfish Barge =

Floating greenhouse module that uses hydroponic agriculture

The Jellyfish Barge at Expo 2015.

The Jellyfish Barge is a floating greenhouse module that uses hydroponic agriculture and 70% less water compared to traditional agriculture. The barge is made of recyclable materials and uses solar distillation to collect 150 liters of saltwater daily and turn it into freshwater. 15% seawater is added back into the water to improve the mineral content and nutritional value of the crops. One module is approximately 70 square meters and can be used to grow between 1400 and 1600 plants per month. 120 units can be constructed on a hectare.

The project was included as part of the Expo 2015 in Milan, Italy. It was conceptualized by Stefano Mancuso and was financed by the Cassa di Risparmio di Firenze. The architects of the module were Antonio Girardi and Cristina Favretto.
