= Jean-Gabriel Ganascia =

French computer scientist and philosopher (born 1955)

- Ganascia in 2017
- Born: April 5, 1955 (age 71); Limoges, Haute-Vienne, France
- Education: Pierre and Marie Curie University; Paris-Sud University
- Known for: Catopticon; Le Mythe de la Singularité
- Awards: Prix Roberval, coup de coeur des médias (2017); Légion d'honneur (2019); Prix du Livre FIC (2022)
- Scientific career
- Fields: Artificial intelligence; Machine learning; Computational ethics; Digital humanities
- Workplaces: Sorbonne University
- Thesis: AGAPE et CHARADE: deux techniques d'apprentissage symbolique appliquées à la construction de bases de connaissances (1987)
- Doctoral advisor: Yves Kodratoff
- Website: ganascia.name

Jean-Gabriel Ganascia (born 5 April 1955) is a French computer scientist and philosopher. He is an emeritus professor of computer science at Sorbonne University and a researcher at the Laboratoire d'informatique de Paris 6.

His early work was in symbolic machine learning, including a rule-learning system and an interestingness measure he introduced in 1991. Later, he worked on computational ethics, and then on the digital humanities. In Voir et pouvoir (2009) he proposed the Catopticon, which is a model of surveillance being exercised from below rather than by those in power.

He chaired COMETS, the ethics committee of the French National Centre for Scientific Research, from 2016 to 2021. He is a fellow of the European Association for Artificial Intelligence and was made a Chevalier of the Légion d'honneur in 2019.

Ganascia has also written essays on artificial intelligence for a general readership. His book Le Mythe de la Singularité (2017) is an attack on the idea of a coming technological singularity, and Servitudes virtuelles (2022) argues that the major technology companies impose a form of virtual subjection and compete with states for the attributes of sovereignty. He has also published fiction under the pen name Gabriel Naëj.

== Early life and education ==
Ganascia was born in Limoges, Haute-Vienne on 5 April 1955.

In 1983, he defended a doctoral thesis on knowledge-based systems and then in 1987, a thèse d'État on symbolic machine learning, both at Paris-Sud University in Orsay under the supervision of Yves Kodratoff.

== Career ==
Ganascia became a professor of computer science in 1988 at Pierre and Marie Curie University, now part of Sorbonne University, where he is an emeritus professor.

During the 1990s he coordinated national research in cognitive science. First, he worked for the Ministry of Research and, from 1995, was director of a joint programme grouping the ministry, the CNRS and other national research bodies.

From 2011 to 2020 he was deputy director of OBVIL, a project that brought his team at LIP6 together with literary scholars at Paris-Sorbonne University to apply computing to the study of literature.

Ganascia chaired COMETS, the ethics committee of the CNRS, from 2016 to 2021. He served on CERNA, the French ethics committee for research in the digital sciences, and in that capacity appeared before the French Senate's committee of inquiry into digital sovereignty in June 2019. He has been chair of the ethics committee of France Travail, the French public employment service, since 2021, and has served as president of the Association Française pour l'Avancement des Sciences.

== Research ==
In a 1991 paper on deriving learning bias from rule properties, Ganascia introduced a measure of rule interestingness. This measure is now known in the data mining literature as the Ganascia index. It is used for scoring partial classification rules by weighing supporting records against counter-examples, and is also known as descriptive confirmed-confidence.

In the same 1991 paper, Ganascia described CHARADE, which is a system for learning sets of classification rules. He developed it as part of his work on symbolic machine learning. Johannes Fürnkranz and Tomáš Kliegr wrote that the system simplifies its output in two stages. First, it removes conditions from individual rules that are logically implied by the remaining conditions, and then removes whole rules that are implied by other rules in the learned set. Fürnkranz and Kliegr credit it as the first rule-learning system to recognize the trade-off between a rule set's accuracy and its comprehensibility.

With Julien Bourdaillet, Ganascia developed MEDITE, which is a monolingual text aligner built for textual genetic criticism. It compares the successive versions of an author's text. It detects insertions, deletions, replacements and displacements at the level of individual characters, using an approach related to sequence alignment in bioinformatics. With Pierre Glaudes and Andrea Del Lungo he developed Phoebus, a system for detecting quotations and reuses in literary texts. It indexes fixed-length word sequences in both texts before repeatedly identifying and extending matching passages.

Ganascia's work in computational ethics takes a top-down, logic-based approach. He has translated ethical principles into formal representations a machine can reason with. In 2007 he formalised Aristotelian consequentialism, Kantian ethics, and Benjamin Constant's theory of principles, using non-monotonic logic implemented in answer set programming. With Fiona Berreby and Gauvain Bourgne he modelled the principle of double effect. Later, he used the event calculus to represent ethical scenarios under both consequentialist and deontological frameworks.

Ganascia and Thomas Powers wrote a chapter on the ethics of AI ethics to The Oxford Handbook of Ethics of AI (2020), which identified conceptual ambiguities in the language of AI ethics and distinguished an AI agent, which has agency but not intention, from the ethical conception of an agent that intends its actions upon reflection.

== Writing ==
Ganascia's first book, L'Âme machine, was published by Éditions du Seuil in 1990. Its title answered La Mettrie's L'Homme-machine (1748). The book surveyed the questions raised by the field of artificial intelligence and argued that narratives about the end of the world, and about machines acquiring consciousness, have no scientific foundation. Brigitte Chamak describes the book as casting the history of artificial intelligence as a life story, running from an embryonic period through the exuberance and excesses of youth to maturity. In 1998 he published Le petit trésor, a dictionary of computing and information science.

=== Voir et pouvoir ===
Ganascia's book Voir et pouvoir: qui nous surveille? was published by Éditions du Pommier in 2009. In the book, he presented the idea that a new model of surveillance was emerging. He drew on Luciano Floridi's notion of the infosphere. In place of Jeremy Bentham's Panopticon, which Michel Foucault had used to describe centralised systems, Ganascia proposed the Catopticon. Panopticon is a concept in which power belongs to those able to see without being seen. Opposed to this, Catopticon is a decentralised form of surveillance exercised from below. Ganascia presented it as the utopia of the present age, a universal space in which everyone can communicate with everyone else on equal terms.

Tiphaine Zetlaoui reviewed Voir et pouvoir in Questions de communication. She wrote that Ganascia has presented a useful technical and conceptual account of surveillance. However, she wrote that the idea did not give enough weight to the conditions in which surveillance systems operate and that she found the central thesis unconvincing. Frédéric Ocqueteau, reviewing the book in Réseaux, called it an essay capable of challenging assumptions about control and discipline. He praised its pages on the ontological status of robots. However, he added that engaging with Bruno Latour would have allowed a fuller treatment of the topic. The criminologist Agneta Mallén took up the concept as a third form of control distinct from Foucault's panopticon. She questioned it as unduly optimistic writing that control in modern societies is not evenly distributed or shared.

=== Le Mythe de la Singularité ===
In 2017 Ganascia published Le Mythe de la Singularité: faut-il craindre l'intelligence artificielle?. It is an essay against the technological singularity. In the book, he challenges three propositions on which the idea rests: Moore's law, Ray Kurzweil's law of universal evolution, and the prediction that machines will become autonomous. He writes that it is incorrect to assumed that the exponential growth in machine performance will continue indefinitely and that computing power does not amount to intelligence. He also writes that, in a philosophical sense, reinforced learning does not give machines autonomy.

He characterises the singularity as belonging to mythos rather than logos. He compares its structure to ancient gnostic thought and argues that its proponents are led by the idea of uploading the mind into a dualism inconsistent with their own premises. In the concluding chapter he attributes the promotion of the idea by major technology companies to corporate communication strategy, and argues that it diverts attention from their ambition to assume functions historically held by states.

Reviewing Le Mythe de la Singularité in RIMHE, Philippe Monin called the book a courageous intervention. He wrote that few voices had questioned a view shared by figures such as Stephen Hawking and Elon Musk. Monin found the chapter on modern gnoses the most stimulating in the book. Brigitte Munier, in Hermès, La Revue, described it as courageous and necessary. She wrote that Ganascia had produced a clear argument which can be understood by readers outside the field. She noted as distinctive among books on the subject his decision to concentrate on the scientific status of the critical point rather than on the wider catalogue of posthumanist promises. She found the essay hurried, however, and regretted that he did not develop his closing argument further. In Études, Franck Damour wrote that the book deconstructs a myth and examines what drives it. He described the critique of the reasoning underlying the myth as sober and clear. Writing in the Swiss daily Le Temps, the philosopher Mark Hunyadi called the attention that the book draws to myths artificial intelligences generates as its chief merit. However, he wrote that a complete account would also have to ask what makes audiences credulous.

=== Later books ===
In 2019 Ganascia published Ce matin, maman a été téléchargée under the pen name Gabriel Naëj. It is a novel set in 2047 and follows the story of Michèle Vidal who wants her consciousness transferred into a manufactured body after her death.

Servitudes virtuelles was published in 2022. In the book, Ganascia argues that intelligent machines have entered everyday life and that public anxiety fixes on minor dangers but ignores graver risks. It takes in projections of superintelligence and the difficulty of withdrawing from cyberspace, and argues that the technology companies impose a form of subjection. The moral principles currently present to regulate artificial intelligence offer very less protection against this subjection. Michèle Leduc described the book as a severe warning that strikes at the pillars of digital ethics, treating the field as one still under construction.

Ganascia's book L'IA expliquée aux humains was published by Éditions du Seuil in September 2024. The book is built around an invented scenario in which the author is interviewed about artificial intelligence by four secondary school pupils.

== Awards and honours ==
- 2015 - 2020 - Senior member, Institut Universitaire de France
- 2017 - Prix Roberval, grand public category, mention "coup de coeur des médias", Université de Technologie de Compiègne
- 2019 - Chevalier of the Légion d'honneur
- 2022 - Prix du Livre FIC, university research category, Forum International de la Cybersécurité
- Fellow, European Association for Artificial Intelligence

== Selected publications ==
- Ganascia, Jean-Gabriel (1990). L'Âme machine: les enjeux de l'intelligence artificielle (in French). Éditions du Seuil.
- Ganascia, Jean-Gabriel (1991). "Deriving the learning bias from rule properties". Machine Intelligence 12. Clarendon Press. pp. 151–167.
- Ganascia, Jean-Gabriel (2009). Voir et pouvoir: qui nous surveille? (in French). Éditions du Pommier. p. 255.
- Ganascia, Jean-Gabriel (2017). Le Mythe de la Singularité: faut-il craindre l'intelligence artificielle? (in French). Éditions du Seuil. p. 144. ISBN 9782021309997.
- Ganascia, Jean-Gabriel (2022). Servitudes virtuelles (in French). Éditions du Seuil. p. 320. ISBN 9782021440317.
