= Gia M. Hamilton =

American applied anthropologist

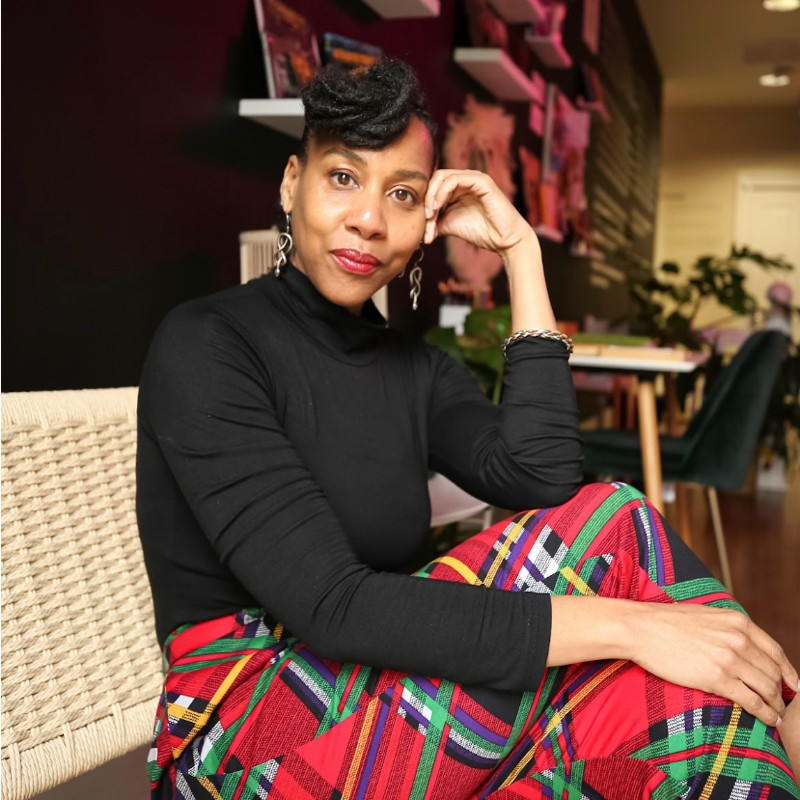
- Born: Gia Maisha Hamilton; July 30, 1978 (age 47); New Orleans, Louisiana, U.S.
- Education: CUNY Graduate Center; New York University
- Occupation: Curator
- Years active: 2006-present
- Website: giahamiltonstudio.com

Gia Maisha Hamilton (born July 30, 1978) is an American applied anthropologist who employs methodology to investigate land, labor and cultural production while examining social connectivity within institutions and communities. Hamilton co-founded an independent African centered school, Little Maroons in 2006; later, she opened a creative incubator space- Gris Gris Lab in 2009 and designed and led the Joan Mitchell Center artist residency program in New Orleans as a consultant from 2011- 2013 and director from 2013-2018.

== Early life and education ==
Hamilton was born in New Orleans, Louisiana. Her father is a retired nuclear engineer.

Hamilton received a bachelor's degree in cultural anthropology from New York University and a Master's of applied anthropology from Graduate Center of the City University of New York.

== Career ==
In 2011 Hamilton curated The Invisible Man Exhibit at The George & Leah McKenna Museum of African American Art through her Gris Gris Lab project for Prospect 2, a meeting place and think tank for local cultural workers to work together which she launched in 2009 in New Orleans. The show referenced Ralph Ellison's novel and highlighted local contemporary black male artists.

In 2013 Hamilton became the Director of the Joan Mitchell Center where she spearheaded the creation of their New Orleans twelve million dollar campus development of an artists' residency program, cultural initiatives and investment in the local arts community. The residency program hosts international emerging, mid-career and established artists alongside local emerging artists that fosters a dialogue about their work on an international platform. She was able to bring criticality to the project as well as knowledge of native New Orleanean art, "ethnographic assessment and organizational design."

Hamilton was invited by Ace Hotel to curate Southern Parlour Exhibition, that created a new space for cultural exchange and dialogue about blackness in contemporary art for both artists and visitors. Southern Parlour was one of four salons Ace Hotel hosted and one of Hamilton's goals was to examine the multiple perspectives contemporary work by black artists offers. This exhibition was hosted by Hamilton's project, Afrofuture Society, which is a global-thinking cultural and social New Orlean's based group that explores alternatives to dominant culture.

Hamilton moderated a panel for Prospect 3 on political and social responsibility of art institutions and artists. The panel included Brandan Odums of ExhibitBE, Imani Jacqueline Brown and Lisa Sigal of Blights Out, Willie Birch, and Nari Ward.

Hamilton was one of four curators to revive the Atlanta Biennial at the Atlanta Contemporary in 2016 featuring a Southern perspective on the contemporary art survey show. The show examined connections between artists across the Southeast instead of focusing on artists in the Atlanta metro area. Notable artists featured in this exhibition include William Downs, Stacy Lynn Waddell, Kalup Linzy and Harmony Korine.

Hamilton has contributed essays to exhibition catalogs:

- Magnetic Fields: Expanding American Abstraction, 1960s to Today (Kemper Museum of Contemporary Art, 2017) – Magnetic Fields aims to change this perspective by focusing on nonrepresentational work by women artists of color.
- An Impulse to Keep (Greenwood Art Project, 2021) - Published on the occasion of the Greenwood Art Project, an initiative led by artists Rick Lowe/william cordova with Jerica Wortham, Marlon Hall, Jeff Van Hanken and Kode Ransom. Hamilton wrote the essay "Imagine" for the catalogue.

As part of Savannah College of Art and Design's initiative for bringing international creatives in to dialogue with SCAD students, Hamilton led a discussion with artists Lavar Monroe, Robin Rhode and the design group R & R Studios at SCAD Museum of Art in 2016.

In 2018, Hamilton received a Next City Vanguard fellowship. She partnered with Airbnb to host a Modern Matriarch tour, which focuses on women of color in New Orleans' 7th ward.

Hamilton has written for Huffington Post and Pelican Bomb about maintaining a healthy lifestyle as a culture worker and single mother of four boys.

Hamilton has been on the board of Tulane University's Newcomb Museum, Alliance for Artist Communities, and New Orleans Video Access Center. She has also been featured in curatorial intensives with Independent Curators International.

Since 2019 Hamilton has reopened the New Orleans African American Museum and has been serving as its executive director and chief curator.

== Family ==
Hamilton lives in New Orleans with her five sons and daughter in Tremé.
