= Sarah Workneh =

American curator

Sarah Workneh is an arts administrator and currently serves as the co-director of Skowhegan School of Painting & Sculpture in Madison, Maine. She has lectured on her work as a residency director, including at Hauser & Wirth in partnership with BFAMFAPhD, the 2009 Alliance of Artist Communities conference, the International Studio & Curatorial Program, Wassaic Projects, and others.

Workneh is involved in the Maine art community beyond her work at Skowhegan. She served as the co-curator of the 2018 Portland Museum of Art Biennial in Portland, Maine. The exhibition was co-curated with Nat May, Theresa Secord, and Mark Bessire. She also juried the Maine Farmland Trust 2019 artists residencies.

Workneh is active in promoting and supporting Black artists through her work with Theaster Gates, Carrie Mae Weems, and Eliza Myrie on the organizing committee for Black Artist Retreat and through her work as a guest editor of Art Papers with an issue focusing on Art in the African Diaspora.
