= Art Papers =

American art magazine and nonprofit

ART PAPERS
- Editor: Sarah Higgins
- Categories: Art magazines
- Frequency: Quarterly
- Founded: 1976
- First issue: February 1977
- Final issue: Fall 2023
- Country: United States
- Based in: Atlanta, Georgia
- Language: English
- Website: artpapers.org
- ISSN: 0278-1441

ART PAPERS is an Atlanta-based bimonthly art magazine and non-profit organization dedicated to the examination of art and culture in the world today. Its mission is to provide an independent and accessible forum for the exchange of perspectives on the role of contemporary art as a socially relevant and engaged discourse. This mission is implemented through the publication of ART PAPERS magazine and the presentation of public programs.

== History and profile ==
ART PAPERS was established in 1976 as the internal newsletter (originally known as Atlanta Art Workers Coalition Newspaper) of the Atlanta Art Workers Coalition. The AAWC was formed in 1976 under the premise to “promote, protect, and aid the visual artists of Atlanta through programs focused on the need of individual artists and art groups.” In addition to the newspaper, the coalition maintained other programs and publications: an Information Resource Center; the Coalition Gallery; and the Metro Atlanta Directory of Visual Arts. In 1980, the newspaper was renamed Atlanta Art Papers and soon evolved into a publication to encourage the growth of art criticism in Georgia. Atlanta Art Papers became ART PAPERS in 1981 and has since developed into an internationally and nationally recognized platform for contemporary art document, experiment and criticism while also rooted in Southern identity. In addition to the bi-monthly magazine, ART PAPERS , as a non-profit organization, supports programming such as a live lecture series called ART PAPERS LIVE, an artist project commission series ART PAPERS LEARN, and an exhibitions program. ART PAPERS has been a recipient of various grants and fellowships including the Andy Warhol Foundation for the Visual Arts. The Editor and Artistic Director is Sarah Higgins. In 2023, ART PAPERS announced their shutdown and the publication of an archival book. The magazine is headquartered in Atlanta, Georgia.

== Notable editors-in-chief ==
- Julia Fenton, Founding Editor (1975-1977)
- Laura Lieberman, Co-Founder and Editor (1977-1984)
- Dan R. Talley, Co-Founder and Editor (1980-1982)
- Sylvie Fortin (2004-2012), formerly Executive and Artistic Director La Biennale de Montréal
- Victoria Camblin (2013–2018)
- Sarah Higgins, Editor and Artistic Director (2018–present)

== Notable guest and contributing editors ==
- Sarah Workneh, co-director at Skowhegan School of Painting and Sculpture
- Fahamu Pecou, Visual/performing artist and scholar
- Dushko Petrovich, painter and creator of Adjunct Commuter Weekly
- Robert Wiesenberger, graphic design critic
- Niels Van Tomme, curator, researcher and critic
- Erin Dziedzic, contemporary art curator
- Jerry Cullum, Visual art critic
- Susan Morgan
- Alex P. White, Malone art studio founder'
- Nuit Banai, Art Historian and Critic
- D. Eric Bookhardt, writer and art critic
- Susan Canning, art historian, independent curator and critic
- Michael Fallon, arts writer
- Susan W. Knowles, independent curator
- Jennie Klein, writer
- Pil and Galia Kollectiv, artists and writers
- Paul Krainak, painter and critic
- David Moos, curator

== Notable contributors ==
- Theaster Gates, Social Practice Installation Artist
- Ai Wei, Contemporary artist and activist
- Wendy and Amy Yao, Musicians
- James Franco, Actor, writer, poet, filmmaker
- Alanna Heiss, Founder and Director of Clocktower Productions
- Rhizome, a not-for-profit arts organization
- Justin Vivian Bond, singer-songwriter, author, painter, performance artist, occasional actor, drag queen, and Radical Faerie
- Strauss Bourque-LaFrance, artist
- MALONE, collaborative design/art studio
- Will Corwin, independent curator
- Institute of Contemporary Art, Philadelphia
- MoMA PS1
