= Danièle Bourcier =

French lawyer and essayist (born 1946)

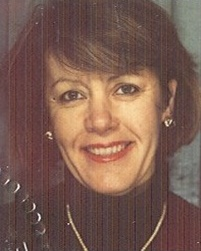
Danièle Bourcier.

Danièle Bourcier (born 1946 in Anjou) is a French lawyer and essayist, who has contributed to the emergence of a new discipline in France: Law, Computing and linguistics.

She is director of research emeritus at CNRS, leads the "Law and Governance technologies" Department at the Centre for Administrative Science Research (CERSA) at the University Paris II, and is associate researcher at the March Bloch Centre in Berlin and at the IDT laboratory of the Autonomous University of Barcelona.

== Scientific and academic biography ==
Her doctoral thesis in public law, after she obtains a scholarship for Stanford University (USA) describes the first application of artificial intelligence in the legal decision. She uses other models (theory of argumentation, Neurolaw, complex systems, graph theory) to explore the cognitive aspects of legal phenomena, modeling of legal knowledge, and socio-legal impacts of digitization of law.

Her work in legal language took place at the Conseil d’Etat in the Legal Informatics Centre, founded by Lucien Mehl (State Councillor) who was also one of the first juricyberneticians. From 1982 to 1994, she headed the laboratory of the CNRS No. 430 Computers Legal Linguistics at the State Council.

She was a visiting professor at Netherlands (Netherland Institute for Advanced Studies), in Sweden, (Swedish Collegium for Advanced Study) in Austria (Institut für die Wissenschaften vom Menschen), and Wissenschaftzentrum Zu Berlin, WZB (2008).

In these different Advanced Studies Institutes, she develops theory on e-government and computational ethics.

Her research is currently focusing on the Open Science, Open Data, protection of personal data and the evolution of copyright in the digital age. She gave a lot of lectures on "Legal Robots and Artificial intelligence".

She launched in 2004 the French Creative Commons licences : she is currently the scientific lead of the French Chapter Creativecommons.fr in charge of the scientific aspects of the CC licences.

She gives lectures on Cybercrime (Master 2 Criminal Law and Criminal Policy in Europe, University Paris 1) and on e-government (Master 2 Public Policy and Administration, University Paris 2). She also taught at the University Paris X (Master 2 Theory of Law) at ENSTA, Sciences Po, and the National School of Administration (ENA).

Interested in mechanisms and unexpected effects of discoveries in science and particularly in Law and political Science, she published (with Pek van Andel) at Hermann, Paris: From Serendipity in Science, Technology, the Art and law (2nd edition). She was co-organizing, in July 2009, an interdisciplinary symposium in the Center of Congres “Chateau de Cerisy la Salle” in Normandy, leading to the publishing of the collective work La Sérendipité, un hasard heureux, at Hermann publisher.

The work she has done with Pek van Andel on serendipity led to the spread of the notion and the phenomenon of serendipity in the Francophonie world: the word sérendipité (in French) was elected the word of the 2011 Year by a scientific newspaper and entered the French usual word book in 2012.

She was appointed in various international and national expertise: UNESCO (updating Recommendation 1974 for scientific researchers), European Commission and the Global Biodiversity Information Facility (GBIF); Focus Group RTD-L.3; OECD (Group Genomics and Informatics-Privacy and Security Issues); the Dutch Royal Academy of Sciences (Legal Education and Technology) and Organisation internationale de la Francophonie (OIF). Recently (April 2016) she was invited as expert in artificial decision & Robot at UN Geneva (Convention on Certain Conventional Weapons, CCW).

She also works on the theory of complex systems applied to law, and the neuroconnexionnist networks. She conducts linguistic research on the legal language and argumentation, and finally the writing the law. This research led her to develop methods in legislative drafting in which she studied the development of new forms of coordination to agree on norms. Her study on digital communities in Europe have allowed her to explore the governance of commons. The research on Commons rooted in his implication in Creative Commons project.

== Curriculum ==
- State Doctorate in Public Law (Special Award CNRS and City of Orléans)
- MA in Political Science
- MA in Linguistics
- Degree in Modern Literature

== Responsibilities ==
- Member of the Commission of Reflection on the Ethics of Research in Science and Technology (CERNA) since 2012
- Member of the French Ethics Committee of sciences, CNRS (COMETS) (2011-2016)
- Co-founder and lead of Creative Commons France since 2004
- Head of Multidisciplinary Thematic Network "Law & Information Systems" at the CNRS (STIC department) since October 2002
- deputy Director then Director of the Research Institute “Informatics Law Linguistic”s UA 962 CNRS-Council of State (1985-1997)
- Vice-president of the French Association of System Science (AFSCET) since 2008
- Founder and director of the new University Studies Diploma (DEUST): Law, Computer and Information Systems, University Paris I, Panthéon Sorbonne (1988-1995)
- Member of the scientific advisory board of the Law and Governance Technologies Series, Springer
- Member of the editorial board of the journal Law, Risk & Probability, Oxford University Press;
- Member of the journal Artificial Intelligence and Law, Springer.
- Member of the editorial board of the European Journal of Law and Information Technology
- Editorial Board of Res Systemica and of the journal Really Sustainable (Biodiversity and Ecology)
- Founding member of the international think tank: Substantive Technology in the Law school (SUBTECH)

== Partial bibliography ==
- Le Tour du monde de la sérendipité en 80 récits, avec P. van Andel, Paris, Tredaniel, 2016
- Open data & Big data, (D. Bourcier & P. de Filippi eds), Paris, Mare & Martin, 2016.
- De la sérendipité dans la science, la technique, l'art et le droit, avec Pek Van Andel, Paris, Hermann, 2^{e} édition, 2013, 323 p.
- La société en action. Une méthode pour la démocratie, avec Gilles Hériard Dubreuil, Sylvain Lavelle, Paris, Hermann, 2013, 231 p.
- Politiques publiques et systèmes complexes, (ed.) avec P. Mazzega et R. Boulet, Paris, Hermann, 2012
- La sérendipité, le hasard heureux, (ed.) avec Pek van Andel, Paris, Hermann, 2011
- Trends in Legal Knowledge, (ed.) avec Casanovas P., Noriega P., Galindo F., Florence, European Press Academic Publishing, 2007, 306 p.
- I-commons at the digital age ou la création en partage (ed.) avec M. Dulong de Rosnay, Romillat, Paris 2004
- Intelligencia artificial y derecho, Editorial UOC, Barcelelona, 2003, 199 p.
- Intelligence artificielle appliquée au droit, Editorial UOC, Barcelona, 1999
- Legal Knowledge and Informations Systems, (ed.) JURIX 2003, 187 p.
- Technology and legal Practice, Symposium Issue, (ed.) avec H. Burstyn, P. Hassett, C. Roquilly, Syracuse Law Review, v.52, n.4, 2002
- La loi l'écriture - revue Passages d'encre, juin 2001
- Informatique et droit (en français et en russe), (ed.) avec R. Strongin, V. Fluhr, V. Gergel, Presses universitaires de Nijni, Novgorod, 2000, 212 p.
- Savoir innover en droit, (ed.) avec Louise Cadoux, Hommage à Lucien Mehl, La Documentation française, Paris, 1999, 346 p.
- Les paradoxes de l'expertise. Savoir et décider (en coll. avec M. de Bonis), Les Empêcheurs de penser en rond, Synthélabo, 1999, 126 p.
- Interpréter le droit: le sens, l'interprète la machine, (ed.) avec C. Thomasset, Bruxelles, Bruylant, 1996, 502 p.
- L’écriture du droit face aux technologies de l’information, (ed.) avec C. Thomasset, Paris, Diderot, 1996, 655 p.
- La décision artificielle, Les voies du droit, PUF, 1995, 237 p.
- Le droit saisi par l'ordinateur, (ed.) avec C. Thomasset et R. Côté, Montréal, Yvon Blais inc., 1993, 472 p.
- Lire le droit, langue, texte, cognition, (ed.) avec P. Mackay, L.G.D.J., "Droit et Société", 1992, 486 p.
- L'administration et les nouveaux outils d'aide à la décision, (ed.) avec Jean-Paul Costa, Les cahiers constitutionnels de Paris I, "Les grands colloques", STH, 1992, 213 p.
- Ordre juridique et ordre technologique, cahier S.T.S n^{o} 12, Éditions du CNRS, 1986
- Le discours juridique : analyses et méthodes, Revue Langages, Larousse, mars 1979, n^{o} 53

== Main papers and chapters ==
- "Open data : l'ouverture des données", avec P. De Filippi, La semaine juridique - édition générale, LexisNexis, 2014, pp. 42
- "Architecture et gouvernance : Le cas des architectures distribuées sur Internet", avec P. De Filippi, Pensée Plurielle, 2014, pp. 42
- "Les communautés numériques : objectifs, principes et différences", avec P. de Filippi, La documentation française, Cahiers Français, n^{o} 372, 2013, p. 47-47.
- "La double face de l'Open Data", avec P. de Filippi, in Petites Affiches, n^{o} 203, Lextenso, octobre 2013
- " L'Open Data : universalité du principe et diversité des expériences ?", in La Semaine Juridique Administrations et Collectivités territoriales, n^{o} 38, Lexisnexis, 16 septembre 2013
- "A history of AI and Law, in fifty papers : 25 years of the International Conference on AI and law", avec T. Bench-Capon (et ali), in journal Artificial Intelligence and Law, Springer, 2012
- "Partages de valeurs et valeurs de partage dans les communautés numériques", avec P. de Filippi, n° spécial, La société numérique, in Cahiers français, Paris, DILA, décembre 2012.
- "Réseaux normatifs relatifs à l'environnement: structures et changements d'échelles" in Bourcier, D., Mazzega, P., Boulet, R., Politiques publiques et systèmes complexes, Paris, Hermann, 2012, p. 107-130.
- "Faut-il écrire la coutume ? Réflexions sur l'évolution des rapports entre coutume et droit à l'heure d'Internet", in L'intégration de la coutume dans l'élaboration d la norme environnementale, N. Meyer et C. David (ed.), Bruylant, Bruxelles, 2012
- "Régulation juridique, complexité et sérendipité. Politiques Publiques", in Bourcier, D., Mazzega, P., Boulet, R., Politiques publiques et systèmes complexes, Paris, Hermann, 2012, p. 31-47.
- "Vers un nouveau modèle de partage entre l'administration et les communautés numériques", avec P. de Filippi, in Matyjasik N., Mazuel P. (dir.) Génération Y et gestion publique: quels enjeux ?, IGPDE, Paris, 2012. 200p., p. 67-86.
- "Cloud Computing. New research perspectives for Computers and Law", Proceedings of the Workshop "Computational Law: a bridge towards the business rules. One-day workshop" en collaboration avec la 13^{e} Conférence Internationale sur l'Intelligence Artificielle et le Droit (ICAIL), 6 juin 2011, Pittsburgh, Springer
- "L'acte de juger est-il modélisable ? De la logique à la justice", Archives de philosophie du droit, "L'E-Justice, Dialogue et Pouvoir", Tome 54, Dalloz, 2011.
- "La construction de l'air intérieur à travers les politiques publiques. Du privé au commun.", in Revue Sciences sociales et Santé, décembre 2011
- "Sciences juridiques et complexité. Un nouveau modèle d'analyse", in Droit et Cultures, Technologies, Droit et Justice, n^{o} 61, 2011, p. 37-54
- "A complex-system approach: legal knowledge, ontology, information and networks", avec P. Mazzega, P. Bourgine, N. Nadah, R. Boulet, in Casanovas, P., G. Sartor, M. Biasiotti, M. Fernandez-Barrera (Eds.), Approaches to Legal Ontologies. Theories, Domains, Methodologies, Springer, Heidelberg, 2011, p. 117-132.
- "Commons Digital Works: Thinking Governance", in Bourcier, D. et al. Intelligent Multimedia. Managing Creative Works in a Digital World, Florence, EPAP, 2010.
- "Les Allemands et les Français face à la vie privée. Que nous apprend le droit sur les cultures?" in Le respect de la vie privée, Rapport pour le Congrès du Mouvement Jeune Notariat, 6-10 octobre 2010, Berlin, p. 59-70
- "Network Analysis of the French Environmental Code", avec Romain Boulet et Pierre Mazzega in AI Approaches to the Complexity of Legal Systems (AICOL 2009), Pompeu Casanovas, Ugo Pagallo, Giovanni Sartor, Gianmaria Ajani, Dec 2009, Rotterdam, Netherlands. Springer, 6237, pp. 39–53, 2010, LNAI.
- "The Network of French Legal Codes", avec P. Mazzega et Romain Boulet in 12th International Conference on Artificial Intelligence and Law (ICAIL 2009), Jun 2009, Barcelona, Spain. ACM, pp. 236–237, 2009
- "French Roadmap for complex Systems " avec David Chavalarias, Paul Bourgine, Edith Perrier, Fréderic Amblard, François Arlabosse et al., 2009
- "A propos des fondements épistémologiques d'une science du droit", in Quelles perspectives pour la recherche juridique ?, Paris, PUF, "Droit et Justice", 2007, 359 p., p. 69-75.
- "Droit, Administration et technologies de l'information et de la communication", in Communication et connaissance. Supports et médiations à l'âge de l’information, J-.G. Ganascia (ed.), éditions du CNRS, 2006
- "Susciter la construction interdisciplinaire d'ontologies juridiques : bilan d'une expérience", avec M. Dulong de Rosnay, J. Legrand, M. Harzallah, J. Charlet et N. Aussenac-Gilles. Semaine de la Connaissance, journée Ontologies et textes juridiques, Jun 2006, Nantes, France. 3, pp. 50–59, 2006
- "Methodological Perspectives for Legal Ontologies Building: an Interdisciplinary Experience", avec M. Dulong de Rosnay et J. Legrand, ICAIL '05, Jun 2005, Bologna, Italy. ACM, pp. 240–241, 2005
- "La création comme bien commun universel - Réflexions sur un modèle émergent", avec M. Dulong de Rosnay, in International Commons at the Digital Age - La création comme bien commun à l'ère numérique, Romillat, pp. 85–94, 2004, Droit et Technologies
- "De la publicité à la connaissance des lois. Un changement de perspective", in Le titre préliminaire du code civil, Economica, Paris, 2003
- "La gratuité. Une composante de l'accès ou droit."in La gratuité une question de droit? L'Harmattan, Paris, 2003
- "A Connectionnist Model to Justify the Reasoning of the Judge", avec F. Borges et R. Borges, in Legal knowledge and Information Systems, Jurix 2002, Amsterdam, IOS Press, 2002, p. 113-122
- "De l'intelligence artificielle à la personne virtuelle. Vers l'émergence d'une catégorie juridique" in Revue Droit et société, 49, 2001, p. 847-871
- "Conception of Cognitive interfaces for legal knowledge. Evolution of the JURISQUE project on risks of avalanches" (en collaboration), Proceedings of the 8th International Conference on Artificial intelligence and law, May 21–25, 2001 Washington University in St Louis, USA
- "Pour une éthique de la décision artificielle. Responsabilité et informatisation", Sciences de l'Homme et de la société, La responsabilité des scientifiques, J.-P. Terrenoire (éd.), L'Harmattan, Paris, 2001, p. 121-137
- "Serendipity et abduction in proofs, presumptions and emerging laws", avec P. van Andel Cardozo Law Review, Juillet 2001, 2 '5-6, p. 1605-1620
- “Abduction in Language interpretation and Law making” avec E. Andreewsky in Kybernetes (2000), vol 29, Number 7/8, 836-845
- "From a rule-based conception to dynamics patterns. Analyzing th self organisation of legal systems" avec G. Clergue in Artificial Intelligence and Law, 7, Kluwer 1999, p. 211-225
- "Interprétation et abduction. La science du droit est elle concernée par la sérendipité ?" in Revue Interdisciplinaire d’Études Juridiques, "Les grands courants de l'herméneutique juridique", n^{o} 42, 1999, p. 125-142
- "La novlangue du droit ou comment rendre actifs les textes juridiques", in Langues et droits. Langues du droit, droit des langues, H. Guillorel et G. Koubi (éd.), Bruylant, Bruxelles, 1999
- "L'informatisation du droit : réflexions sur l'évolution des techniques d'écriture de l'État", in European Journal of Law, Philosophy and Computer Science, Legal Computer Science, Vol. 1-2: 237-255, 1998
- "Données sensibles et risque informatique. De l'intimité menacée à l'identité virtuelle", in Questions sensibles, CURAPP, PUF, 1998
- "Le citoyen : objet, sujet ou acteur de la révolution informationnelle?", in Actes du 24^{e} Congrès International des Sciences Administratives, Paris, 7-11 septembre 1998
- "L'informatique, l'écriture et la codification des textes juridiques", avec E. Catta, in Revue française de finances publiques, n^{o} 57, "Administration de l'impôt et communication", 1997
- "Pour une morphogenèse du droit : comment analyser l'émergence d'un concept juridique", in Désordres, CURAPP, PUF, 1997, 440 p.
- "Peut-on légiférer l'incertain? Réflexions sur les nouvelles écritures du droit" in Tendances nouvelles en modélisation pour l'environnement, Vie et Sociétés du CNRS, 1997
- "Une sémantique interactionnelle: un paradigme pour la formalisation des connaissances jurisprudentielles", avec M. Rajman, in Bourcier D., Thomasset C. (dir.) L’écriture du droit face aux technologies de l’information, Paris, Diderot, 1996, 655 p., p. 500-526
- "Les lois sont-elles des logiciels? Réflexions sur l'aide à la décision en matière de législation sociale". Revue Française des affaires sociales, Mars 1995
- "Une approche sémantique de l'argumentation juridique. Dire et c'est-à-dire", in L'année sociologique, PUF, 1995
- "Malaise dans la décision", in journal Le Monde, 13 mai 1995
- "L'émergence d'une problématique: l'approche cognitive du droit" in Bourcier, D. Mackay, P. (dir.) Lire le droit, langue, texte, cognition, L.G.D.J., "Droit et Société", 1992, 486 p., p. 11-25
- "Informatique", in Collectivités locales, Jurisclasseur, Éditions Techniques, 1992
- "Peut-on faire émerger des normes d'un réseau? Quelques réflexions sur l'approche connexionniste du droit" in Bourcier, D. Mackay, P. (dir.) Lire le droit, langue, texte, cognition, L.G.D.J., "Droit et Société",1992, 486 p., p. 313-331
- "Extracting legal knowledge by means of multilayer neural network. Application to municipal jurisprudence." avec L. Bochereau et P. Bourgine, in Proceedings of the 3rd ICAIL, June 25–28, 1991, Oxford, ACM, p. 288
- "Interactions des aspects juridiques et des aspects techniques des systèmes experts", avec L. Mehl et H. Mehl-Mignot, in Cahiers Lamy du droit de l'informatique, Lamy, avril 1991
- "L'individu, le nom, la différence : de l'informatisation des sociétés, in Les effets de l'informatique sur le droit à la vie privée, Institut international d'Études des droits de l'homme, CEDAM,Trieste,1990
- "The expert system BRUITLOG and the MAIRILOG project", in Expert Systems in Public Administration, I. Snellen, W. van de Donk, J.-P. Baquiast (eds.), Elsevier, 1989
- "Knowledge, rationality, normativity in legal expert systems", in Expert Systems in Public Administration, I. Snellen, W. van de Donk, J.-P. Baquiast (eds.), Elsevier,1989, p. 57-77
- "Discours juridique, interprétation et représentation des connaissances : les connecteurs d'inclusion", avec S. Bruxelles, in Semiotica, n^{o} 77-1/3, 1989, p. 253-269
- Articles "Analogie" et "Informatique juridique" in Dictionnaire encyclopédique de Théorie et de Sociologie du Droit A.-J. Arnaud (ed), LGDJ, 1988
- "Le droit à S.T.S.", in Cahiers STS, n^{o} 1, "Indisciplines", Éditions du CNRS, 1986
- "Le discours juridique. Contraintes et stratégies.", in Discoss, n^{o} 1, 1985, p. 183-196
- "D'ailleurs : un argument non nécessaire? Ses fonctions dans le discours du juge", avec S. Bruxelles, in Le droit en procès, CURAPP, PUF, 1984
- "1984 : Où en est l'informatique juridique ?", in Informatique et Droit en Europe, Bruylant, Bruxelles, 1984
- "The judge's discourse : research on the modelization of reasoning in law", in Artificial Intelligence and Legal Information Systems, vol. 1, C. Ciampi (ed.), North-Holland, Amsterdam, 1982
- "Argumentation et définition en droit ou Les grenouilles sont-elles des poissons ?" in Languages, Argumentation et discours scientifique, Larousse, n^{o} 42,1976. p. 115-124.
