= LIP6 =

LIP6 may refer to:

- DNAJC14, protein DnaJ homolog subfamily C member 14
- Laboratoire d'Informatique de Paris 6, research centre
