= Pelican Bomb =

Pelican Bomb was a non-profit contemporary visual arts organization based in New Orleans that operated from 2011 through November 2018.

It was dedicated to making New Orleans a supportive place for artists to live and work via its public programming: an online art review, a community supported art program that promotes affordable art sales, a pop-up exhibition program that activates under-utilized and/or vacant spaces in New Orleans, and a critic-in-residence program. In December 2014, Pelican Bomb's roving exhibition "Foodways" was featured in the Huffington Post and described as "one of the gems of P.3" by Priscilla Frank. "Foodways" was a part of the Prospect.3 triennial's local satellite programming and was open from October 25, 2014 through January 25, 2015.

Pelican Bomb ceased operations in November 2018. At that time, Pelican Bomb was led by founding editor and executive director Cameron Shaw and creative and operations director Amanda Brinkman. Other contributors included Adrian Anagnost, Nic Brierre Aziz, Marjorie Rawle, Emily Wilkerson, Taylor Murrow, Benjamin Morris, Corinna Kirsch, Charlie Tatum, James McAnally, and fari nzinga, among many other emerging and established writers.
