= LifeHand =

LifeHand is a prosthetic hand project that allows patients to use an artificial hand to perform daily tasks, but also grants the patient the ability to sense what they are touching. This specific type of prosthetic is called a neuroprosthetic; it's a type of prosthetic that uses a neurological connection between the user and the prosthetic hand to allow the sense of touch. With sensory feedback, the artificial hand allows the user to perceive these senses due to the connection between the patient and the prosthetic. The project was developed/experimented on in the city of Rome, by European researchers from SSSA along with other research centers throughout Europe. There were two LifeHand models that were constructed (The first called LifeHand, developed in 2008, and the second called LifeHand 2, developed in 2014). The results of the LifeHand experiments were worked on for over a decade and have since been published.

== Development/Inner workings ==
The LifeHand project contains 3 complex components that involve the relationship between nerves and electric signals, intracortical microsimulation, and sensory feedback. All of these components play an important role in how the LifeHand works and require copious amounts of research to be able to function by themselves.

=== Beginnings of Neuroprosthetics ===
Due to decades of study and research in the past, neuroprosthetics are now in the foreseeable future and can prove to be extremely useful. The idea behind neuroprosthetics is that a person can regain the sense of feeling by using a prosthetic that is connected to the patient's brain. Herman Von HelmHoltz had started the idea of neuroprosthetics because of his research involving running a nerve fiber current into a dissected frog's calf muscle. This resulted in the contraction of the muscle. HelmHoltz concluded that the relationship between both the muscle and nervous system was linked because of the electrical activity that occurs between the two. Since then, experiments based on his results have provided the foundation for the LifeHand project, since many of its components involve the idea of the relation between nerves, muscles, and electrical signals.

=== The Relationship Between Nerves and Electric signals ===
The LifeHand project rests upon the relationship between electric signals and nerves. The concepts of intracortical microstimulation and intraneural stimulation both require knowledge of how both nerves and electric signals interact. First, nerves are a part of everyone's body and are used as wires that send electric signals from your brain to the rest of the body. All the nerves within the body make up the nervous system. There are two types of nerves that make up this system; the motor nerves and sensory nerves. For the LifeHand project, the sensory nerves are the main focus. Sensory nerves are composed of exteroceptors and mechanoreceptors that help the body perceive touch, further showing why sensory nerves are so important for the LifeHand. The LifeHand (like other neuroprosthetics) uses electric signals to send signals through the nerves to a endpoint, giving off the sense that the limb is still there. Since the nerves are able to interact with electrical signals, it allows for the concepts of intracortical microstimulation and intraneural stimulation be used within the LifeHand project.

=== Intracortical Microstimulation ===
Prosthetic hands in the past have been much less proficient at performing activities as normal hands, which is where research into somatosensation and intracortical microstimulation come into play. Simulating senses has only recently been a discovery for science, since lab animals were only showing results for stimulation of senses through the use of intracortical microstimulation. Intracortical microstimulation (ICMS) is a type of neurorehabilitation that has been constantly researched because it allows for the rehabilitation of the limb. Initially, ICMS was researched by helping animals gain the sense of touch. The information gained from the animals was extremely useful and promising, however, researchers could not gather information in regard to what exactly the animals were feeling. After more research was done on ICMS, some changes were made, and eventually ICMS was able to be used on humans. Research involving patients who were born without a hand or lost it later in life revealed that ICMS was most effective on people who had recently lost/injured a limb. That is not to say it does not have any results with patients born without a limb, though. The LifeHand project is able to utilize this method of neurorehabilitation to allow patients to gain back sensory information and the same motor skills as an actual hand.

=== Sensory Feedback ===
A main focus of the LifeHand project was allowing the patient to regain the somatosensation that was lost. The idea of intraneural stimulation plays a large role in the process of regaining those senses. Intraneural stimulation (INSM) grants the flow of external information to be re-established in the patient due to electrodes that were within the arm. Real time control of the hand prothesis along with the new sensors have been tested recently to be effective with the use of INSM. Both INSM and ICMS sound similar in what they do but in reality, ICMS is how to get the patients nerves and their mind to interact with the LifeHand. While INSM involves how the external information interacts with the sensors on the LifeHand, then the interaction with those sensors and the patient's nerves. This sensory feedback falls under the umbrella of neuroengineering and provides positive results due to its ability to let the patient perceive touch; further showing its potential and why it continues to be researched. INSM is still being developed but great strides have been made in its development, such as:

- The amount of forces applied when grasping an object.
- The patient can gain sensory information about the object when they touch it.
- Soon being able to judge textual features of objects.

The last achievement in the development isn't fully completed, however, the strides to judge an objects textual features is the next major step in being that much closer to a more natural/fluid prosthesis with functioning sensory feedback.

== Results ==
The LifeHand so far is still in development and continues to be researched in order for it to completely mimic a human hand. So far, the LifeHand is able to

1. Manage the amount of force exerted on an object.
2. The patient is able to understand where objects are in relation to themself.
3. Make corrections for if they apply the wrong amount of force/pressure on an object.
4. The patient was also able to feel and understand the shape and texture of an object.

Ongoing development of the LifeHand will continue with the aim of stimulating a human hand and continuing to assist patients with neurorehabilitation.
