= Krista Kim =

Canadian-Korean contemporary artist

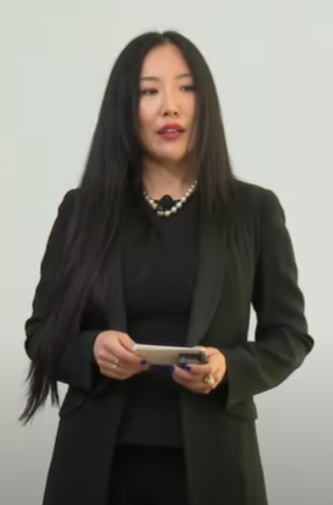
- Speaking at the World Economic Forum's Annual Meeting of the New Champions 2023
- Education: University of Toronto; LASALLE College of the Arts
- Occupations: Artist, editor

Krista Kim is a Canadian-Korean contemporary artist and Vogue Singapore's metaverse editor known for incorporation of light, digital technology, and sound into her artistic creations. Her portfolio includes touring installations, displays, and the sale of non-fungible tokens (NFTs), some of which were developed in collaboration with major corporations.

== Early life and education ==
Kim was born to South Korean parents. She completed her undergraduate studies in political science at the University of Toronto and went on to receive a master's degree in fine arts at the LASALLE College of the Arts in Singapore in 2014.

== Career ==
Kim refers to the overall concept of her art as Techism and includes techniques and media such as LED lights and gradients to create works.

Kim collaborated with Lanvin on a clothing collection in 2018. In 2021, Kim's project Mars House was described as the first virtual house sold as an NFT, having sold for more than USD$500,000 in ethereum (ETH) tokens, a bitcoin alternative in the crypto space. The NFT was designed using video-game software, features music by Jeff Schroeder of The Smashing Pumpkins, and comes with interoperable 3D digital files, allowing the owner to integrate the structure into the metaverse platform of their choice.

Kim is the founder of Techism movement which acknowledges technological advancement as a form of art.

== Recognition ==
Kim has been recognized as one of the UNESCO's "50 Minds for The Next 50". She has been recognized as "the new digital Rothko" by Forbes. Her work has been featured in Singapore, Shanghai, New York, and Washington, D.C.

== Personal life ==
Kim has lived in Tokyo, Seoul, New York and Singapore.
