= Victoria Camblin =

American art historian

- Education: Columbia University (B.A.); University of Cambridge (Ph.D.)
- Occupations: Writer; editor; art historian; curator

Victoria Camblin is a writer, editor, art historian, and curator. She is the former editor and artistic director of Art Papers, based in Atlanta, Georgia. As of June 14, 2018, she is the executive editor of 032c in Berlin, Germany.

== Life and career ==
Camblin attended Columbia University in New York, where she received a dual BA degree in philosophy and art history in 2006, and went on to complete a doctorate at the University of Cambridge. She is a recipient of DAAD (German Academic Exchange Service) and Robert Rauschenberg Foundation fellowships, and was the 2009–2012 Leslie Wilson Major Scholar at Magdalene College, Cambridge. Camblin's doctoral work centered on the avant-garde illustrated periodicals created in Paris during the Interwar period—specifically the editorial work of Georges Bataille and the publication Acéphale.

Between 2006 and 2013, Camblin worked as editor of 032c, the English-language biannual magazine based in Berlin focusing on contemporary culture. Following this, she served as editor for the online video platform Nowness, and has also contributed to a number of international arts publications, including Texte zur Kunst, Dazed, Interview, and Pin-Up. Some of her additional writing includes pieces on architecture in Atlanta in Art in America and criticism for Artforum.

Her curatorial projects include the 2016 Atlanta Biennial, curated alongside Daniel Fuller, Aaron Levi Garvey, and Gia Hamilton.
