= Plantoid =

Synthetic plant

A Researcher working on the "I-Wood", "I-Seed" and "GrowBot" projects of the Center for Convergent Technologies (CCT) Bioinspired Soft Robotics lab

A plantoid is a robot or synthetic organism designed to look, act and grow like a plant.They differ from cyborg plants, since cyborg plants are part living plant and part machine, while plantoids are entirely non-biological.

The concept was first scientifically published in 2010 (although models of comparable systems controlled by neural networks date back to 2003). Plantoids imitate plants through appearances and mimicking behaviors and internal processes (which function to keep the plant alive or to ensure its survival). A prototype for the European Commission is now in development by сonsortium of the following scientists: Dario Floreano, Barbara Mazzolai, Josep Samitier, Stefano Mancuso.

A plantoid incorporates an inherently distributed architecture consisting of autonomous and specialized modules. Modules can be modeled on plant parts such as the root cap and communicate to form a simple swarm intelligence. This kind of system may display great robustness and resilience. It is conjectured to be capable of energy harvesting and management, collective environmental awareness and many other functions.

In science fiction, while human-like robots (androids) are fairly frequent and animal-like biomorphic robots turn up occasionally, plantoids are quite rare. Exceptions occur in the novel Hearts, Hands and Voices (1992, US: The Broken Land) by Ian McDonald and the TV series Jikuu Senshi Spielban.

== Systems and Processes ==
Like plants, plantoids position its roots and appendages (projecting parts of the plantoid) towards beneficial conditions that stimulate growth (i.e sunlight, ideal temperatures, areas with larger water concentration) and away from factors that bar growth. This occurs through a combination of information from its sensors and the plantoid reacting accordingly.

=== Sensors ===
The use of soft tactical sensors (devices that gather information based on the surrounding physical environment) allows the plantoid to navigate its way through its environment. These sensors relay information to the plantoid and produce signals, similar to how a computer can take in information from a keyboard through input. These sensors scan for obstacles or units of interest (i.e. sources of water) by the roots of the robot, and the programming of the plantoid determine if the object of interest is beneficial or not. With this new information, the plantoid sends signals to other moveable parts of the robot to react accordingly, acting similar to how roots relay information to real plants. Since plantoids do not have a central processing unit, the sensors act as individual command centers, feeding directions for nearby root units to interact with. This can result in multiple sensors picking up the same information, and multiple root units moving as a whole.

=== Movement ===
The sensors are attached to the pseudo-roots of the plantoid, and assist in the movement based on feedback, acting like plant roots. With the signal from the sensors of the plantoid, these structures can move towards or away from objects of interests, allowing flexibility of these roots in the soil. This is achieved by the root's architecture, which utilizes springs and motors to allow the robot control over the roots' movements. The motors acts as the main control over the root, taking in information and actuates (operates) towards a direction. The springs allow more flexibility when attached to the motors, combining to form a structure that can move in almost any direction. Additional forms of movements in plantoids are being developed, focusing away from the movement of the roots and more on the movement of the plantoid . In the 2015 GrowBot project led by Barbara Mazzolai at the Istitudo Italiano di Technologia, a form of transportation for plantoids is being developed that mimics the functions of tendrils (structures along a plant's stem that latches onto structures in the environment for support or movement), allowing plantoids to change their location as seen fit (for nutrients or for research purposes). The artificial tendrils on this plantoid have a tube running through layers of fabric, with ions mixed in water running through this tube. If an electric charge is sent through the tube, the water starts to flow as the ions attach themselves to the fabric, and the tendril will start to curl. The development of tendrils in plantoids offer more mobility in an unknown or harsh environment.

=== Algorithms ===
Plantoids are programmed through specific algorithms for different functions, ranging from the movement of the roots to the versatility of the sensors. The mechanical limbs of the plantoid operate solely off of algorithms and coding, allowing individual parts to react to the plantoid's environment. Algorithms in the sensors of the plants will allow the sensors to take in information about resources available in the surrounding area, and react by moving the tips of the plantoids appropriately. Projects focus on the algorithms of roots and changing the interface so more interactions can occur between the roots and the rest of the plantoid as a reaction. Other algorithms are currently being worked on for other appendages, such as absorbing materials into the plantoid's body.

== Utilization ==
Plantoids offer versatility to humans through data collection and its adaptability to an environment.

=== Monitoring ===
Some plantoid experiments have shown interest in exploring the quality of soil due to their ability to operate autonomously and use sensors underground. Their autonomous nature allows researchers to track soil patterns, areas with low water or natural resources, and pollution within the soil over a period of time. Monitoring the soil through plantoids offers an advantage to current tracking methods on soil health that are not as technologized.

=== Exploration ===
The autonomous nature of the plantoid allows it to explore harsh environments (extremely cold or warm habitats) that researchers have trouble collecting data about. The flexibility and programming of the plantoid gives it adaptability to multiple environments, and could be used for space exploration in environments not yet explored.

=== Researching ===
In the biorobotics field, the behavior of the roots in a plantoid offers researchers knowledge about how plants function as a unit, and how individual units lead an organs' function. Improving the designs and studying the behavior of plants can lead to other forms of biorobotics that implement the same behavior. These new technologies could use multiple sources of information with different reactions based on how it is marked.

== Prototypes/Projects ==
Multiple projects have researched and improved the design and technology of plantoids since its conceptualization.

=== STREP Project ===
The STREP Plantoid Project (May 1, 2012 to April 30, 2015) was an early project that made progress in the design and understanding of how the plant functions. Its goal was researching the behavior of plant roots and creating technology that could imitate the efficiency of the roots' functions. From this project, the understanding of plant roots and their behavior towards stimuli and positive factors in the environment have been published, and the communication between different parts of the system have been replicated through technology (root caps and sensors that relay information to the plantoid). This project offered data on the technology used by the sensors, which would be improved upon in later projects as the root sensors could detect more environmental factors around them. The local communication of roots to other parts of the plantoid were researched to understand the pathways and design that would best imitate these lines of communication.

=== GrowBot Project ===
The GrowBot project (2015) is a prototype of a plantoid that has artificial tendrils, offering mobility by gripping external surfaces. This project focused on the plantoid moving towards stimuli and navigating unknown environment using tendrils, with hope of evolving the technology so that it can move against gravity. The GrowBot project displayed the ability of plantoids to position itself not only in terms of its roots, but the entire robot when stimuli is discovered.

=== Plantoid Project ===
The Plantoid project (2016) emphasized flexibility of roots through the use of springs and sensors that gave feedback when interacting with nutrient gradients or obstacles. This project took inspiration from plants and the roots' ability to overcame any obstacles that the environment presented. The feedback and response of the roots was replicated in this prototype, specifically how the root would move based on what objects the sensor picked up. The springs used in the roots allowed for more degrees of freedom compared to previous models of plantoids, and motors were combined with algorithms to effectively respond to feedback taken by the plantoid. The development of these sensors was accompanied by the development of algorithms that would place value on objects around the plantoid's roots (positive or negative) and lead to reactions based on if the object was deemed positive or not (roots move towards or away).

== See also ==
- Biotechnology
