= List of cultural references in The Cantos =

This is a list of persons, places, events, etc. that feature in Ezra Pound's The Cantos, a long, incomplete poem in 120 sections, each of which is a canto. It is a book-length work written between 1915 and 1962, widely considered to present formidable difficulties to the reader. Strong claims have been made for it as one of the most significant works of modernist poetry of the twentieth century. As in Pound's prose writing, the themes of economics, governance and culture are integral to its content.

The most striking feature of the text, to a casual browser, is the inclusion of Chinese characters as well as quotations in European languages other than English. Recourse to scholarly commentaries is almost inevitable for a close reader. The range of allusion to historical events and other works of literature is very broad, and abrupt changes occur with the minimum of stage directions.

This list serves as a collection of links to information on a wide range of these references with clear indications of the cantos in which they appear. It also gives relevant citations to Pound's other writings, especially his prose, and translations of non-English words and phrases where appropriate. Where authors are quoted or referred to, but not named, the reference is listed under their names and the quoted words or phrases are given after the relevant canto number. Individual canto numbers are given in bold for ease of reference.

== A ==
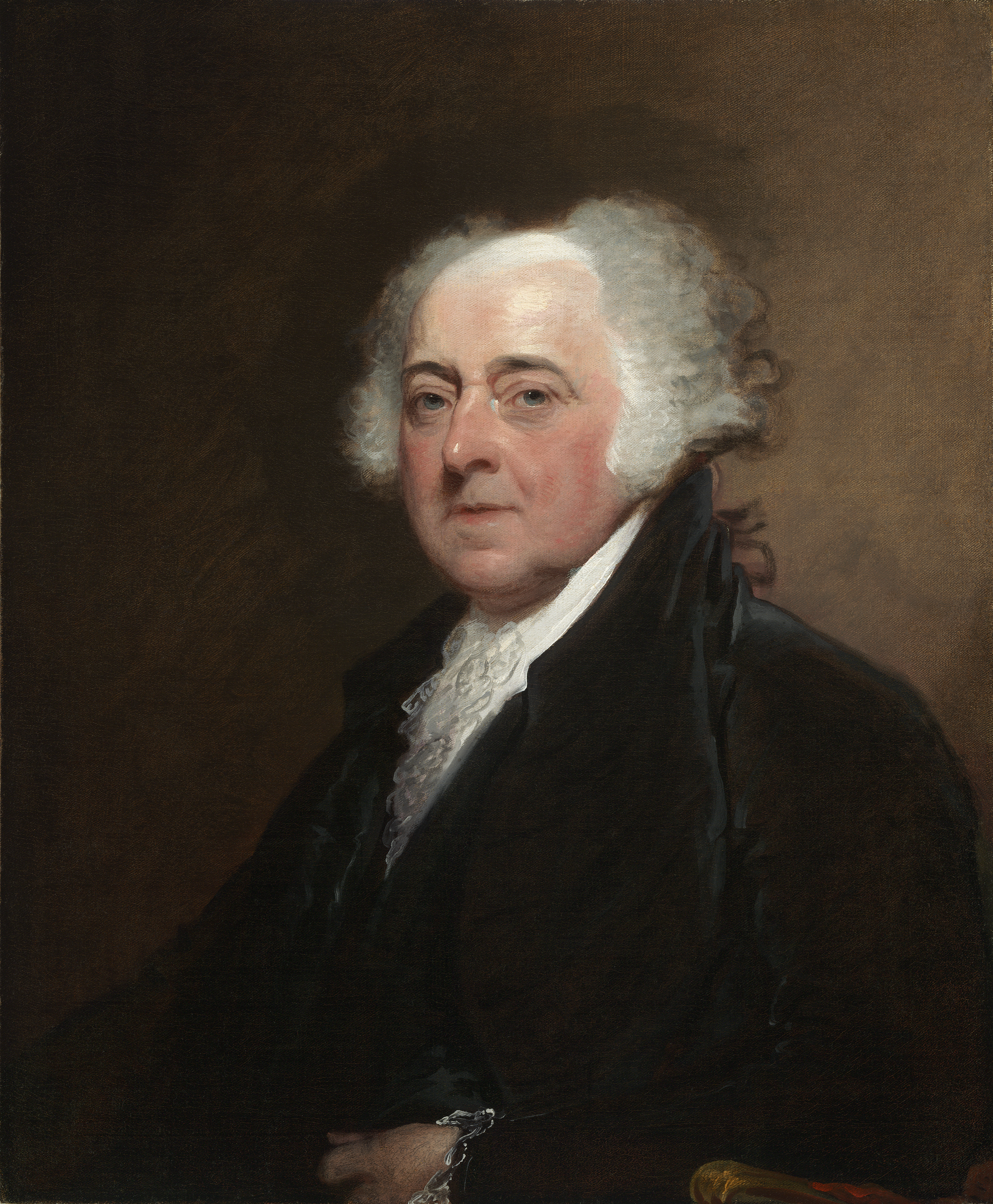
John Adams: "the man who at certain points/made us/at certain points/saved us" Canto LXII

- Acoetes – Acoetes is the narrator of the tale from Ovid's Metamorphoses retold in **Canto II**. Acoetes is the pilot of the pirate ship that kidnaps a youngster who turns out to be the god Dionysus and who transforms the ship into a rock and the sailors into fish. Acoetes warns his fellows about the wrong they are doing, but they don't heed him, being "mad for a little slave money".
- Abd al Melik (Abd-el-Melik, Habdimelich) – The first Caliph to strike Islamic coinage – **Canto XCVII**
- John Adams – Second President of the United States; "the man who at certain points/made us/at certain points/saved us" (**Canto LXII**), and one of Pound's great political heroes. – **Cantos XXXI – XXXIV, L** – "the revolution was in the minds of the people" **, LXII – LXXI**
  - Novanglus – Pen-name Adams used for essays written in 1775 to argue against the British Parliament's right to tax or legislate for the American colonies. **Canto LXII**
- John Quincy Adams – Son of John Adams – **Canto XLVIII**
- Charles Francis Adams – Son of John Quincy Adams – **Canto XLVIII**
- Samuel Adams – Cousin of John Adams – Adams Cantos
- Adonis – **Canto XVIIL**
- Aegisthus – **Canto XC**
- Aeschylus – Cantos II, VII: Puns on the name of Helen of Troy as "destroyer of men" ("Eliandros") and "destroyer of cities" ("Elanpolis") from his play Agamemnon used by Pound. In his 1920 essay Translators of Greek: Early Translators of Homer, Pound criticises Robert Browning's translation of the passage containing these puns. – Canto LXXXII: Swinburn on.
- Louis Agassiz – Naturalist. He is cited approvingly in Pound's ABC of Reading (1934) for his insistence that students should actually look closely at specimens before writing about them as exemplifying "the proper METHOD for studying...that is, careful first-hand examination of the matter, and continual COMPARISON". – **Cantos LXXXIX, XCIII, C, CXIII**
- Olivia Rossetti Agresti – **Cantos LXXVI, LXXVIII**
- Rodolphus Agricola – Canto LXXXIX: quoted on the roles of writing: "ut doceat, ut moveat, ut delectet" ("to teach, to move, to delight").
- Leon Battista Alberti – Architect and Renaissance theorist – **Canto IX**
- Albigensian Crusade – **Canto XXXIII**
- Alcmene – Mother of Hercules – **Canto XC**
- Alexander the Great – Cantos LXXXV, LXXVI, CXIV: Enlightened rule exemplified by the fact that he paid his soldiers' debts.
- Algazel – **Canto XCIII**
- St. Ambrose – Canto LXXXVIII: Against monopolists, **Canto C**
- Amphion – Canto LXXXIII: Mythical founder of music. – **Canto XC**
- Anacreon – Canto LXXXIII: Fragment 7 quoted in German translation ("The women say to me 'you are old'")
- John Penrose Angold – Poet and friend of Pound who died in World War II – **Canto LXXXIV**
- Annals of Spring and Autumn – **Cantos LXXVIII, LXXXII** ("there are no righteous wars" quoting Mencius)
- Gabriele d'Annunzio – Italian poet – **Canto XCIII**
- Meyer Anselm – Banker – **Canto LXXIV**
- St. Anselm of Canterbury – 11th century philosopher and inventor of the ontological argument for the existence of God who wrote poems in rhymed prose. Appealed to Pound because of his emphasis on the role of reason in religion and his envisioning of the divine essence as light. In a 1962 interview, Pound points to Anselm's clash with William Rufus over his investiture as part of the history of the struggle for individual rights. Pound also claims that Anselm's writings influenced Cavalcanti and Villon. – **Cantos CI, CV**
- Anti-Semitism – **Cantos XXXV, XLVIII, L, LII, LXII, LXIII, LXXIV, XCI**
- Emperor Antoninus Pius – Canto LXXXVII: Law of the sea (Lex Rhodia), Canto LXXXVIII: Lending money at 4%, **Cantos XCVII, XCVIII**
- Anubis – Egyptian god of the dead – **Canto XCII**
- Aphrodite (also called Cythera, Kuthera Kupris and Venus) – **Cantos I, LXXIV, LXXVI, LXXVII, LXXIX, LXXX, LXXXI, XC, XCI**.
  - Terracina – Seaside town between Rome and Naples which was formerly the location of a temple to Venus (or possibly Jupiter). In his 1930 essay Credo, Pound wrote "Given the material means I would replace the statue of Venus on the cliffs of Terracina." – **Cantos XXXIX, LXXIV, XCI**.
- Apollonius of Tyana – Philosopher and 'lost' alternative to Christianity. Pound was particularly taken with this dictum that the universe is alive. – **Cantos XCI, XCII, XCVII**
- Thomas Aquinas: **Canto C**
- Aristotle – **Canto XCIV**
- Artemis – **Canto CX**
- Athelstan – Early English king who helped introduce guilds in that country. – **Canto XCVII**
- Saint Augustine – **Canto XCIV**
- Avicenna – **Canto XCII**

== B ==
- F.W. Baller – Translator of the Sacred Edict – **Canto XCVIII**
- Edward Bancroft – Double agent in the service of the British – **Canto LXV**
- Bank of England – **Canto XVIL**
- John Hollis Bankhead II – U.S. Senator who met Pound in 1939 – **Canto LXXXIV**
- Josef Bard – Hungarian-born writer and friend of Pound – **Canto LXXXI**
- Béla Bartók – Pound admired his music and compared Bartók's Fifth Quartet with The Cantos as showing "the defects inherent in a record of struggle." – **Canto LXXXIV**
- Charles A. Beard Historian of Revolutionary America – **Canto LXXXIV**
- Aubrey Beardsley – In his 1913 essay The Serious Artist, Pound discusses two types of art; The "cult of beauty" and the "cult of ugliness". He compares the former with medical cure and the latter with medical diagnosis, and goes on to write "Villon, Baudelaire, Corbiere, Beardsley are diagnosis." – "beauty is difficult": **Cantos LXXIV, LXXX**
- Mabel Beardsley – Sister of Aubrey Beardsley and renowned beauty. – **Canto LXXXII**
- Cesare Beccaria – Italian author of On Crimes and Punishments, which had a great influence on the American Constitution, the Bill of Rights and the U.S. judicial system. – **Canto LXIV**
- Jonathan Belcher – colonial governor of Massachusetts and New Hampshire from 1730–1741, governor of New Jersey from 1746 to 1757 – **Canto LXIV**
- Belgium – Canto LXXXVI: In the context of the Congress of Vienna
- Belisarius – Byzantine general – **Canto C**
- Gertrude Bell – Explorer – **Canto LII**
- Giovanni Bellini – **Canto XVL**.
- Julien Benda – Author of La trahison des clercs, the English translation of which was by Pound's friend Richard Aldington. – **Canto XCI**
- Thomas Lovell Beddoes – **Cantos LXXX, XCV**
- Thomas Hart Benton – U.S. senator from Missouri who opposed the establishment of the Bank of the United States. His Thirty Years View is a key source for the Rock Drill section of The Cantos. – **Cantos LXXXV – XCV**
- Blessed Berchtold – **Canto LXXXVII**
- Albert Jeremiah Beveridge – **Canto LXXXI**
- Nicholas Biddle – **Canto XXXVII**
- Laurence Binyon – Poet and friend of Pound in his early London days. Pound advised him with his translation of the Divine Comedy and published a review of the first part in 1934 under the title Hell. – **Cantos LXXX, LXXXIII**
- Otto von Bismarck – **Cantos LXXXVI, C**
- Wilfred Scawen Blunt – **Cantos LXXXI, LXXXII**
- Book of the Prefect (or Eparch) – **Canto XCVI**
- William Edgar Borah – U.S. Senator who met Pound in 1939 – **Cantos LXXXIV, LXXXVI**
- Bertran de Born – Troubadour: his lament Si tuit li dolh ehl planh el marrimen was translated by Pound as Planh for the Young English King and is quoted in **Cantos LXXX, LXXXIV**
- Boston Massacre – **Canto LXIV**
- Sandro Botticelli – Canto XVL: His painting La Calunnia mentioned. Cantos XX, LXXX: mentioned as "Sandro".
- James Bowdoin – American patriot, scientist and poet – **Canto LXII**
- Claude Gernade Bowers – **Canto LXXXI**
- Brendan Bracken – **Canto LXXVI**
- Joshua Brackett – Doctor and patriot who served as a judge in the New Hampshire maritime court during the revolution – **Canto LXIV**
- Constantin Brâncuși – Canto LXXXV: Mental state of the artist at work – Cantos LXXXVI, XCVII: "I can start something any day, but finish..."
- William Brattle – Information he provided to the British led to the Boston Massacre – **Canto LXVI**
- Henry Bracton – 13th-century British lawyer who wrote on constitutional law, stressing that the king is subject to law. His thinking influenced the American Founding Fathers. – **Canto LXVII**
- Eva Braun – Canto CX: associated with "beer-halls".
- Robert Browning – **Cantos II, LXXX**
- Henri Gaudier-Brzeska – **Cantos LXXVIII, LXXX**
- Basil Bunting – **Cantos LXXIV, LXXVII, LXXXI**
- Martin van Buren – U.S. politician whose Autobiography was an important source for Pound's cantos on the Bank wars. – **Cantos XXXVII, LXXVIII, C**
- Aaron Burr – Vice-President under Jefferson, Burr killed Alexander Hamilton in a duel. – **Canto LXVI**
- Mather Byles – Clergyman who lost his parish in Boston and was almost repatriated to Britain because of his loyalty to the Crown. – **Canto LXIV**
- Byzantine Empire (Byzantium) – **Canto XCV**

== C ==
- Guillaume de Cabestang – Troubadour poet. According to legend, his heart was fed to his married lover by her husband. She then threw herself from a cliff to her death. – **Canto IV**
- Cadmus – Grandfather of Pentheus and Dionysus; founder of Thebes – **Canto II**
- League of Cambrai – **Canto LI**
- Piere Cardinal – Troubadour poet – **Canto XCVII**
- Carolingian Empire – **Canto XCVI**
- Kit Carson – Served as Fremont's guide. – **Canto LXXXIX**
- Castalia – A spring sacred to the Muses. – **Cantos XC, XCIII**
- Cathar heresy, also known as Albigensians – passim
- John Catron – Jacksonian judge and chief justice from 1830 till 1836. – **Canto LXXXIX**
- Catullus – Cantos IV and V: Arunculeia is the name of the bride in the Epithalamion Carmen 61 – Canto V: "vesper adest" is from another epithalamion Carmen 62 – Canto XX: "quasi tinnula" ("as if ringing") echoes "voce carmina tinnula" ("singing in a ringing voice") from Carmen 61 – Canto **XXVIII** "voce tinnula" echoes Carmen 61 again.
- Guido Cavalcanti – 13th-century Italian poet and friend of Dante, who condemned his father to hell in the Divine Comedy. In his 1928 essay, How to Read, Pound lists Cavalcanti among the inventors, or poets who were responsible for introducing something to the art that had never been done before. In an essay published in 1934 and written between 1911 and 1931, Pound wrote "Guido is called a 'natural philosopher', I think an 'atheist', and certainly an 'Epicurean', not that anyone had then any clear idea or has now any very definite notion of what Epicurus taught. But a natural philosopher was a much less safe person than a 'moral philosopher'. It is not so much what Guido says in [Donna mi pregha], as the familiarity that he shows with dangerous thinking; natural demonstration and the proof by experience or (?) experiment... we may perhaps consider Guido as one of that 'tenuous line who from Albertus Magnus to the renaissance' meant the freedom of thought, the contempt, or at least a moderated respect, for stupid authority." – Cantos IV and XX: an allusion to and a quotations from the poem Una figura della Donna mia, which refers daringly to the resemblance between Cavalcanti's beloved and the image of the Madonna in a Florentine church. – Canto XXXVI: a translation of Donna mi prega. – Canto LXXIII: a lengthy speech (in Italian) by Guido's ghost. – Canto XCI: "I send to Pinella ... a river", from the poem Ciascuna fresca e dolce fontanella.
- Cavour – Prime mover in the 19th century unification of Italy – **Canto LXI**
- Ceres – **Canto LXXXI**
- Charlemagne – Carolingian ruler – **Canto XCVI**
- Charles the Bald (Charles le Chauve) – **Canto LXXXIII**
- History of China – **Cantos LII – LXI**
- Winston Churchill – **Cantos LXXII, LXXIII, LXXIV, LXXXVII**
- Circe – Cantos I, XVIIL: on her island – **Canto XXXIX** Greek quotations describe her
- Chou King – See next entry
- Classic of History – Section: Rock Drill where Pound calls it the Chou King
- Henry Clay – 19th century U.S. politician – **Canto LXXXVIII**
- Augustin Smith Clayton – 19th century U.S. politician – **Canto LXXXVIII**
- Cleopatra wrote on currency – **Cantos LXXXV, LXXXVI**
- Jean Cocteau – **Cantos LXXVII, LXXX**
- Sir Edward Coke – Late 16th to early 17th-century British jurist whose writings on the English common law were the definitive legal texts for some 300 years. – **Cantos LXIII, LXIV, LXVI, XCIV, and CVII – CIX**

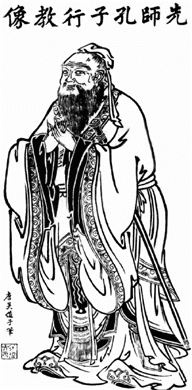
Engraving of Confucius, Pound's greatest political hero.

- Horace Cole – **Cantos LXXX, LXXXI**
- Padraic Colum – Canto LXXX: His "O woman shapely as a swan" (from a poem called Drover) quoted. Pound praised this poem in his 1918 essay A Retrospect.
- Confucius – Also called **Kung, Kung-fu-tseu** and **Chung** at various points in the poem. Pound saw himself as a committed follower of the Chinese philosopher and translated the Analects, the Book of Odes, the Great Digest and the Unwobbling Pivot. Under the various version of his name, Confucius appears in The Cantos at least 76 times. The first and most comprehensive of these appearances is in **Canto XIII** – Also in Canto LI: Ideogram at end is Confucian "rectification of names", Canto LII: Li Ki, Canto LIII: Cut 3,000 odes to 300.
  - The four Tuan, or foundations (benevolence, rectitude, manners and knowledge) – **Cantos LXXXV, LXXXIX**
- Congress of Vienna – Canto LXXXVI: Example of politicians working to avoid war
- Séraphin Couvreur (January 14, 1856 – ?) – French Jesuit missionary to China. His edition of the Chou King, with French and Latin translations, was used by Pound in the Rock Drill section (**Cantos LXXXV – XCV**).
- Credit – passim
- Cumaean Sibyl – **Cantos LXIV, XC**
- Cunizza da Romano (1198–1279) – Mistress of poet Sordello, sister of Ezzelino III da Romano. She is one of the most important heroines of The Cantos, a type of the poet's sexual and spiritual muse. She "freed her slaves" (**Canto VI**) in her will, a document which she dictated in Florence "in the house of the Cavalcanti / anno 1265" (**Canto XXIX**). Pound imagined that Guido Cavalcanti knew of this and mentioned it to his friend Dante who therefore pardoned her profligacy and placed her in the Heaven of Venus (Paradiso IX): "The light of this star o'ercame me" (**Canto XXIX**). This passage is cited in Italian in Canto XCII: "fui chiamat' / e qui refulgo". **Canto XC** associates her with John Randolph of Roanoke ("liberavit masnatos").
- Thomas Cushing – American politician who opposed independence – **Canto LXII**

== D ==
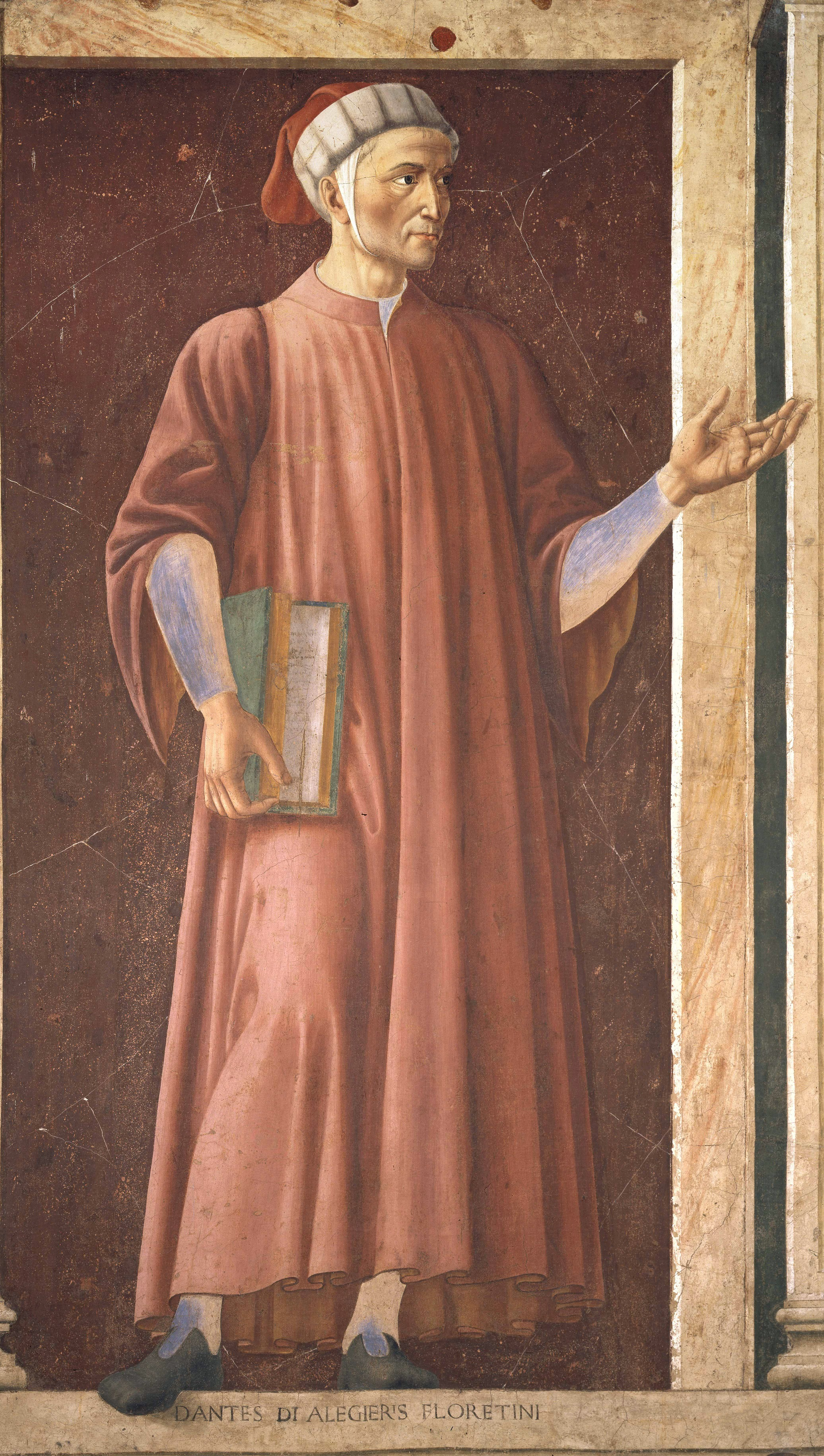
Dante in a fresco series of famous men by Andrea del Castagno, ca. 1450 (Uffizi Gallery)

- Dafne – A nymph who was turned into a shrub to escape the lustful pursuit of Apollo. Also, Dafne was an attempt to revive Greek theater that resulted in the creation of opera – **Canto II**
- Arnaut Daniel – Troubadour poet. Pound translated most of his surviving work and agreed with Dante's high estimation of him. In his 1910 book The Spirit of Romance, Pound wrote "The Twelfth Century, or, more exactly, that century whose center is the year 1200, has left us two perfect gifts: the church of San Zeno in Verona, and the canzoni of Arnaut Daniel" In his 1928 essay, How to Read, Pound lists Arnaut among the "inventors", or poets who were responsible for introducing something to the art that had never been done before. – Canto VII: the line "e qu'el remir [contra'l lum de la lampa]" ("and look at her [against the light of the lamp])" from the poem Douz braitz e critz quoted. Canto XX: "noigandres" ("banishes ennui") – Canto XCI: The line "pensar de lieis m'es repaus" ("it rests me to think of her") from En breu brizara'l temps braus quoted. In the 1911/12 series of essays I gather the limbs of Osiris, Pound writes of this line: "You cannot get statement simpler than that, or clearer, or les rhetorical". – **Cantos XXIX, XCVII**
- Dante Alighieri Italian poet whose Divine Comedy, a long allegorical poem in three parts (Inferno, Purgatorio, Paradiso) and 100 cantos describing the poet's journey through hell, purgatory and paradise was a major model for Pound's long poem. In his 1928 essay, How to Read, Pound lists Dante among the inventors, or poets who were responsible for introducing something to the art that had never been done before. Cantos LXXXV – Canto XCIII: Discussed distributive justice.
  - The Divine Comedy
    - Inferno: **Canto CX** (Lines on the doomed lovers Paolo and Francesca quoted) – **Canto CXI** (Inferno XVII source for Geryon. In the essay Hell, his 1934 review of Laurence Binyon's translation of the Inferno, Pound wrote "Deep hell is reached via Geryon [fraud] of the marvelous patterned hide, and for ten cantos thereafter the damned are all of them tamned for money.")
    - Purgatorio: Canto VII: (Description of Sordello from Purgatorio VI applied to Henry James) – **Canto LXXXIV** (Purgatorio XXVI lines on Arnaut Daniel misquoted) – **Canto XCIII** (Purgatorio XXVIII quoted extensively at end) – **Canto XCVII** (Purgatorio XXVI on Arnaut Daniel)
    - Paradiso: Cantos VII, XCIII, CIX: (Paradiso II on Dante's "dinghy") – **Canto XXXIX** (Paradiso XIX quoted "che sovra Senna induce, falseggiando la moneta" ("is bringing upon the Seine by falsifying the coin") – Canto XCVIII: divine light – **Canto XCIII** (Paradiso: Canto VIII quoted "non fosse cive" ("if he were not a citizen") – **Canto C** on "letizia" ("gladness")
  - La Vita Nuova: **Canto LXXVII** "[Ego tamquam] centrum circuli" ("[I am] the centre of a circle") quoted. The entire passage is quoted in the 1911/12 series of essays I gather the limbs of Osiris.
  - Il Convito – Canto XCI: "che il terzo ciel movete" ("who moves the third heaven") quoted – **Canto XXV** "compagnevole animale" (man is a "companionable animal") quoted
  - **Other works** – **Canto CXVI** (Canzone Al poco giorno e al gran cerchio d'ombra quoted)
- Georgius Dartona Renaissance humanist. Pound used his versions of the Homeric Hymns as a source. – **Cantos I, LXXIX**
- Silas Deane – U.S. agent in France – **Canto LXV**

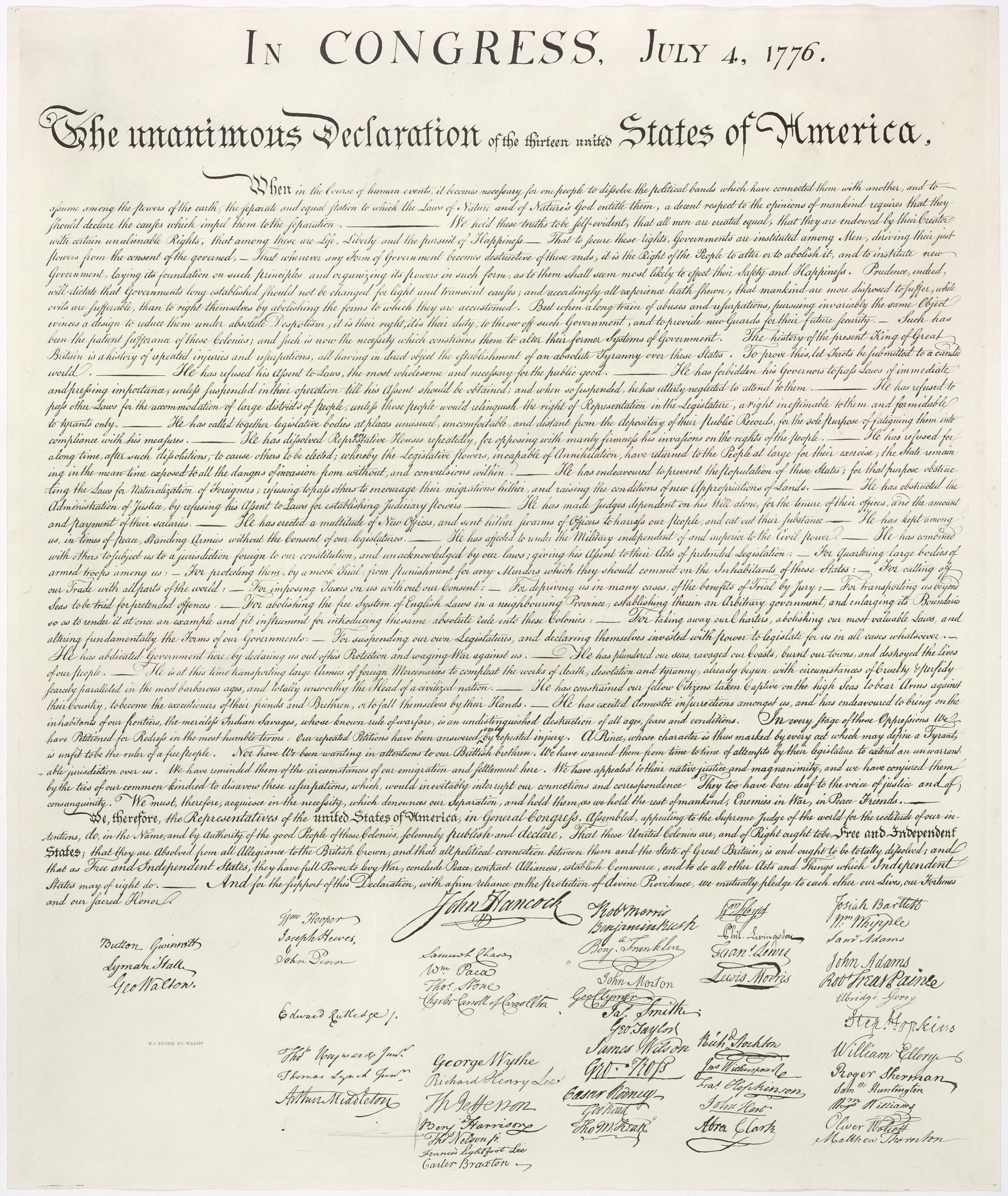
U.S. Declaration of Independence: most of the signatories also feature in The Cantos.

- Declaration of Independence (United States) – **Canto LXV**
- Alexander del Mar – Economic historian whose History of Monetary Systems was a major source for Pound's later writings. Del Mar was Jewish and opposed economic anti-Semitism strongly in his writings. – **Cantos LXXXIX, XCVI, XCVIII, XCIV**
- Edgar Degas – **Cantos LXXIV, LXXX, CIV**
- Demeter – **Canto XCVIII**
- Diana – Latin goddess of hunting, equivalent of Greek Artemis. – Canto XCI: Layamon's hymn to Diana is quoted.
- Dionysus (also called Iacchos and Zagreus) – **Cantos II, XVII, LXXVII, LXXIX, CV**
- Dirce – **Canto LXXXII**
- Disraeli – Canto LXXXIX: The right of search and the Anglo-American War of 1812 to 1814
- Andreas Divus – Renaissance scholar whose Latin translation of Book XI of Homer's Odyssey forms the basis of Canto I. A section of Pound's 1920 essay Translators of Greek: Early Translators of Homer is devoted to Divus and contains the relevant Latin text. – **Canto I**
- Arnold Dolmetsch – **Canto LXXXI**
- Charles Doughty – **Canto LXXXIII**
- C. H. Douglas – **Cantos XXII, XCVII, C**
- Gavin Douglas – 16th century Scottish poet and translator of Virgil's Aeneid. In his essay Notes on Elizabethan Classicists (1917), Pound calls him a great poet and quotes the passage referred to in The Cantos. – Canto LXXVIII: "the city quarhr of nobil fame" is a misremembered quotation from the opening lines of the Aeneid, where it refers to Rome.
- John Dowland – **Canto LXXXI**
- Dryad (Dryas) – Cantos III, LXXXIII: a nymph associated with trees. Ezra and Dorothy Pound referred to H.D. as "Dryas" in their letters.

== E ==
- Peggy Eaton – Wife of Andrew Jackson's Secretary of War John Eaton. A scandal surrounding her past led to Martin Van Buren becoming Jackson's Vice-President. – **Canto XXXVII**
- Ecbatana – **Cantos IV, LXXIV**
- Eleanor of Aquitaine – **Cantos II, VII**
- Electra – **Canto XC**
- Eleusinian Mysteries – passim
- T. S. Eliot (Possum, the Rev. Eliot) – Canto VIII: reference to The Waste Land, Canto XXIX: Views on religion contrasted with Pound's, **Cantos LXXIV, LXXX, XCVIII**
- Queen Elizabeth I Translated Ovid – **Canto LXXXV**
- Oliver Ellsworth – Judge who served on mission to France under Adams – Adams Cantos
- John Endicott – colonial governor of Massachusetts in 1644, 1649, and from 1650 till 1665, with the exception of 1654 – **Canto LXIV**
- Joseph Ennemoser (Ennemosor (sic)) Historian of magic – **Canto LXXXIII**
- Epictetus – Canto LXXI: Hymn to Cleanthes is the source of the Greek text quoted at the end of the canto.
- Johannes Scotus Eriugena (Erigena in Pound's spelling) Pound valued him for his neoplatonic view that all things that are light, his persecution as a heretic long after his death, and the Greek tags in his "excellent" verses – **Cantos XXXVI, LXXIV, LXXXIII, LXXXV, LXXXVII, LXXXVIII, XC, XCII**
- Nicolo/Borso/Etc. d'Este – **Cantos XX, XXIV, LXXXII**
- Ezzelino III da Romano – 13th-century Ghibelline lord of northeast Italy, said to be a bloodthirsty tyrant by his enemies, viewed more favorably by later historians. He was the brother of Cunizza da Romano, and appears in **Canto LXXII** as a furious ghost (and a persona of the irascible Pound): "A single falsehood does more damage in this damned world than all my outbursts".

== F ==
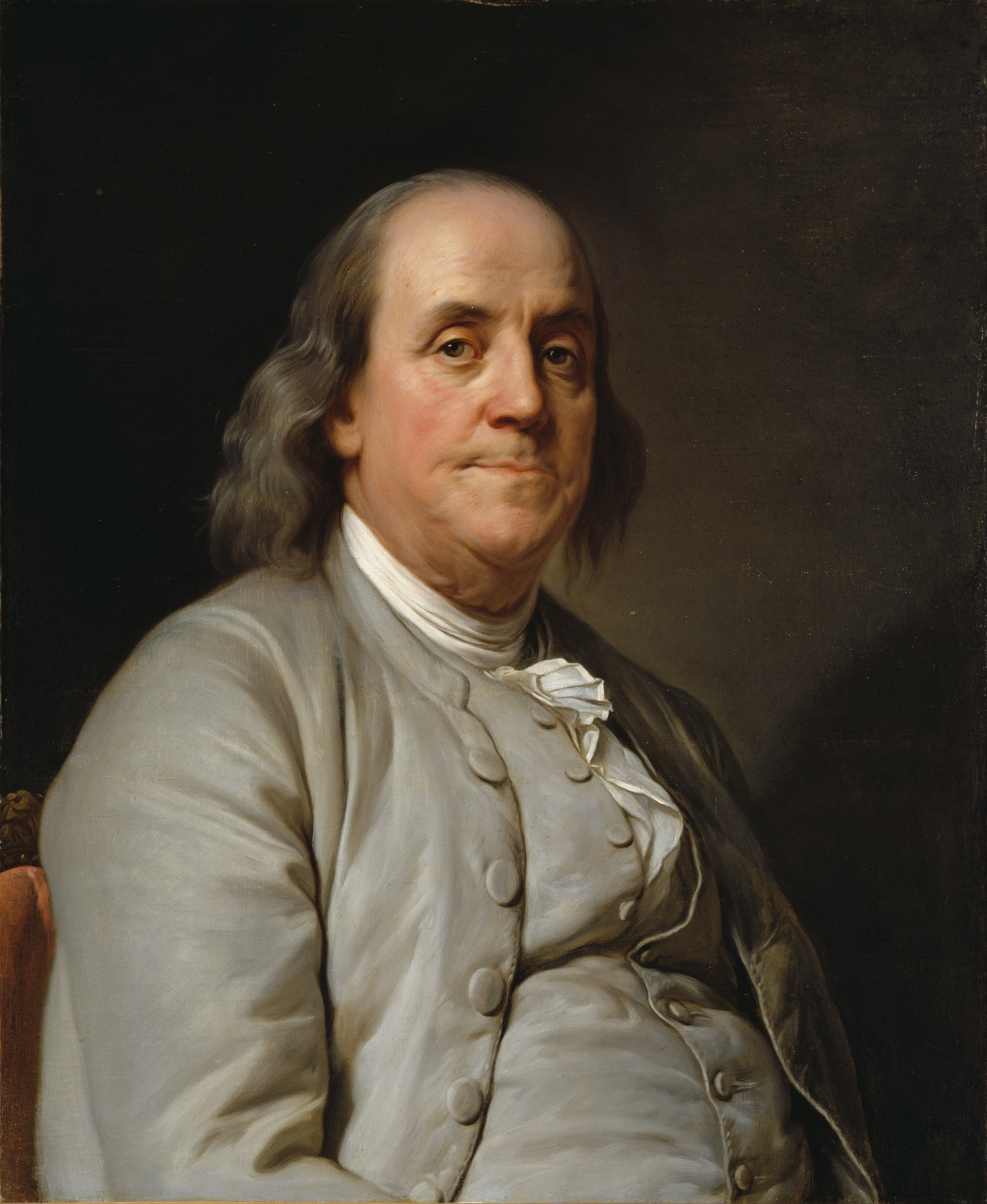
Benjamin Franklin

- Fascism – Although Pound never joined the Fascist Party, he clearly admired Mussolini's brand of the ideology. The word itself does not appear in The Cantos, but the political philosophy it stands for can be readily detected in the poem, especially in the sections written during the 1930s.
- Faunus – God of fields and forests – **Canto XC**
- Desmond FitzGerald – Irish-born Imagist poet who fought in the Easter Rising of 1916 and later served in the government of the Irish Free State – **Cantos XCII, XCV**
- Flamen Dialis – Roman priest of Jupiter – **Canto XCVI**
- Gustave Flaubert – **Canto LXXXII**
- Folquet de Marseille – Troubadour turned bishop who was involved in the suppression of the Cathars – **Canto XCII**
- Ford Madox Ford – **Canto LXXXII** – Cantos XCVIII, C: buy a dictionary and learn the meanings of words
- Piero della Francesca – Canto VIII: the master painter
- Fortuna – **Canto XCVII**
- Benjamin Franklin **Cantos LXII – LXXI** In **Canto LXIII**, the Latin sentence "Eripuit caelo fulmen, mox sceptra tyrannis." (" He snatched the thunderbolt from heaven, the sceptre from tyrants.") is the inscription on Jean-Antoine Houdon's bust of Franklin.
- John Charles Fremont – Explorer and Union general during American Civil War. – **Canto LXXXIX**
- Sigmund Freud – **Canto XCI**
- Leo Frobenius – **Cantos XXXVIII, LXXIV, LXXXIX**
- Buckminster Fuller (Buckie) – **Canto XCVII**

== G ==
- Galileo Galilei – **Canto LXXXV**
- Giovanni Gentile – **Canto LXXXIX**
- Jean François Gerbillon (1654 – 1707 – French Jesuit missionary to China who provided scientific advice to the emperor and wrote topographic accounts of the country. – **Canto LIX**.
- Geryone – **Canto LI**
- Silvio Gesell – **Cantos LXXIV, LXXX**
- Moses Gill – Served as Acting Governor of the Commonwealth of Massachusetts 1799–1800 – **Canto LXV**
- Gold standard
- Goddeschalk – **Canto XCIII**
- Arthur Golding – Canto II: The phrase "Schoeney's daughters" is lifted from a passage in Golding's translation of the Metamorphoses which is quoted in Pound's 1917 essay Notes on Elizabethan Classicists.
- Rémy de Gourmont – French Symbolist. Pound translated his The Natural Philosophy of Love and published an essay on him in 1920. – **Canto LXXXVII**
- Jeremiah Gridley – Boston-born lawyer who was involved in the Writs of Assistance case and later espoused the patriot cause in the War of Independence. – **Canto LXIV**
- Francesco Maria Grimaldi (1618–1663) – Italian scientist and Jesuit best known for his work in the fields of astronomy and the physics of light. – **Canto LX**
- Robert Grosseteste – 13th century philosopher who argued that light is the first corporeal form from which all other forms are derived and that God is pure Light (in a different, non-corporeal sense). Latin tags from his De luce (On light) and De Iride (On rainbows) that appear in The Cantos appear in more extensive quotations in Pound's 1934 essay Cavalcanti – **Canto LXXXIII** "plura diafana" ("many transparencies") from De Iride, **Canto CX** "Lux enim" ("Light of its nature [pours itself into every part]") from De luce.
- Guild – **Cantos XCVI, XCVII**

== H ==
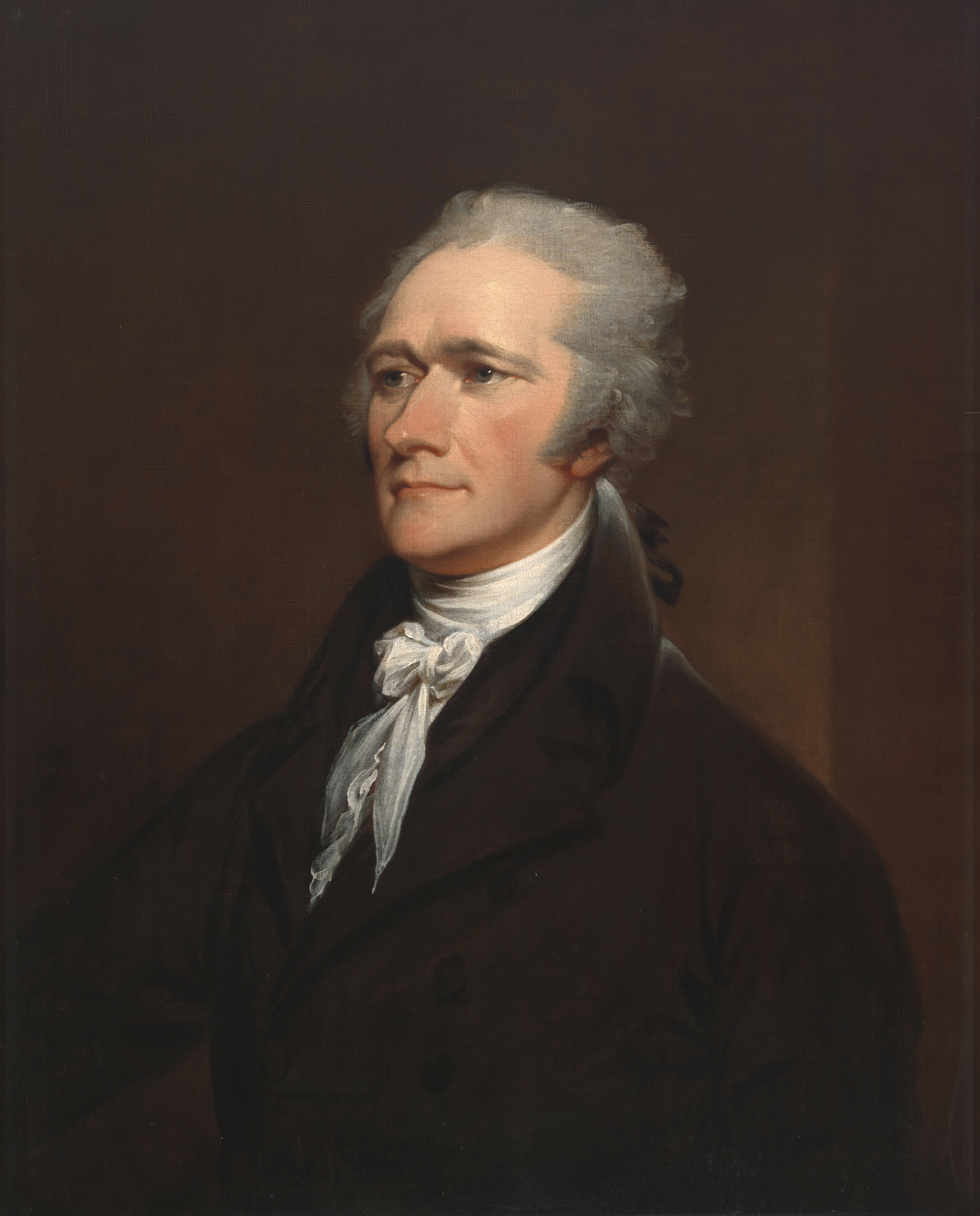
Alexander Hamilton, one of the villains of The Cantos.

- Alexander Hamilton – For Pound, the great villain of U.S. history. – **Cantos XXXVII, LXXII, LXIX**
- James Hamilton Jr. – 19th century U.S. politician – **Canto LXXXVIII**
- Hanno the Navigator – **Canto XL**
- John Hancock – American patriot who signed the Declaration of Independence and was involved in the aftermath of the Boston Massacre – **Canto LXIV**
- Hathor Egyptian sky goddess in the form of a cow. Identified with Aphrodite by the Greeks. – **Canto XXXIX**
- Hebe – Goddess of youth identified by her attribute "kalliastragallos" ("with fine ankles") – **Cantos CIX, CX**
- Helen of Troy – **Cantos VII, XCVIII**
- Philippe Henriot – **Cantos LXXXIV, LXXXIX**
- Patrick Henry – U.S. statesman who is famous for his "Give me liberty or give me death" speech. – **Canto LXV**
- Heraclitus (panta rei [everything flows] quoted) – **Canto LXXXIII**
- Christian Wolfgang Herdtrich (1625–1684) – Austrian Jesuit missionary to China who served as a mathematician at the imperial court and was amongst the earliest European translators of Confucius. – **Canto LX**
- Hesperus – The Evening Star – **Canto II**
- Eva Hesse – German translator of Pound's work. – **Canto CII**
- Maurice Hewlett – Poet and friend of Pound's in his early days in London. – **Canto XCII**
- John Heydon – 17th century mystic, self-styled secretary of nature, and author of the Holy Guide (1662), which Pound read in Stone Cottage with Yeats and then borrowed from Yeats' widow when writing the Rock Drill cantos. His idea of signatures in nature that mean that, for example, every oak leaf is recognisably an oak leaf and not a holly leaf, is important in the Cantos. He also wrote on form and, in Gaudier-Brzeska: A Memoir, Pound wrote: "A clavicord or a statue or a poem, wrought out of ages of knowledge, out of fine perception and skill, that some other man, that a hundred other men, in moments of weariness can wake beautiful sound with little effort, that they can be carried out of the realm of annoyance into the realm of truth, into the world unchanging, the world of fine animal life, the world of pure form. And John Heydon, long before our present day theorists, had written of the joys of pure form . . . inorganic, geometrical form, in his Holy Guide". – **Cantos XCI. XCII**
- James Hillhouse – Clergyman and judge who served as a major in the American Revolution – **Canto LXVIII**
- Leo VI the Wise – Byzantine emperor – **Canto XCVI**
- Leopold von Hoesch – German Ambassador to London during the rise of Hitler – **Canto LXXXVI**
- Homer – In his 1928 essay, How to Read, Pound lists Homer among the "inventors", or poets who were responsible for introducing something to the art that had never been done before. – passim
  - Odyssey – Canto I: Translation of trip to Hades – Canto XX: Quoted "Ligur' aoide" ("sweet song") on the sirens, "neson amumona" ("blameless island") on Thrinacia. – Canto LXXXIX: Quoted "δ'ἀνθρώπων ἴδεν" ("he knew many men" [of Odysseus]) – Cantos XCI, XCIII, XCV, XCVI, XCVIII: Quoted and/or referred to regarding Leucothoe rescuing Odysseus by giving him her veil/kredemnon ("my bikini is worth your raft") – Canto XCVIII: Quoted on Nestor
  - Iliad – Cantos II, VII: Translation of part of Book III in which the old men of Troy discuss Helen. In his 1920 essay Translators of Greek: Early Translators of Homer, Pound criticises the translations of Alexander Pope and George Chapman for failing to capture the quality of "actually speaking" in their versions of this passage.
- William Hooper (of North Carolina) – American patriot who signed the Declaration of Independence – **Canto LXV**
- Alexander von Humboldt – Naturalist and friend of Louis Agassiz – **Cantos LXXXIX, XCVII**
- Samuel Huntingdon – American patriot who signed the Declaration of Independence – **Canto LXIX**
- Robert Maynard Hutchins – **Canto XCI**
- Thomas Hutchinson – **Canto LXIV**
- Hyksos – **Canto XCIII**

== I ==
- Ileuthyeria – Ancient Greek concept and personification of liberty – **Canto II**
- Samuel Delucenna Ingham – 19th century U.S. politician – **Canto LXXXVIII**
- Iong Cheng (Yong Tching) – Son of K'ang Hsi who wrote a commentary on the Sacred Edict – **Cantos LXI, XCIX**
- Itys – **Canto IV**

== J ==
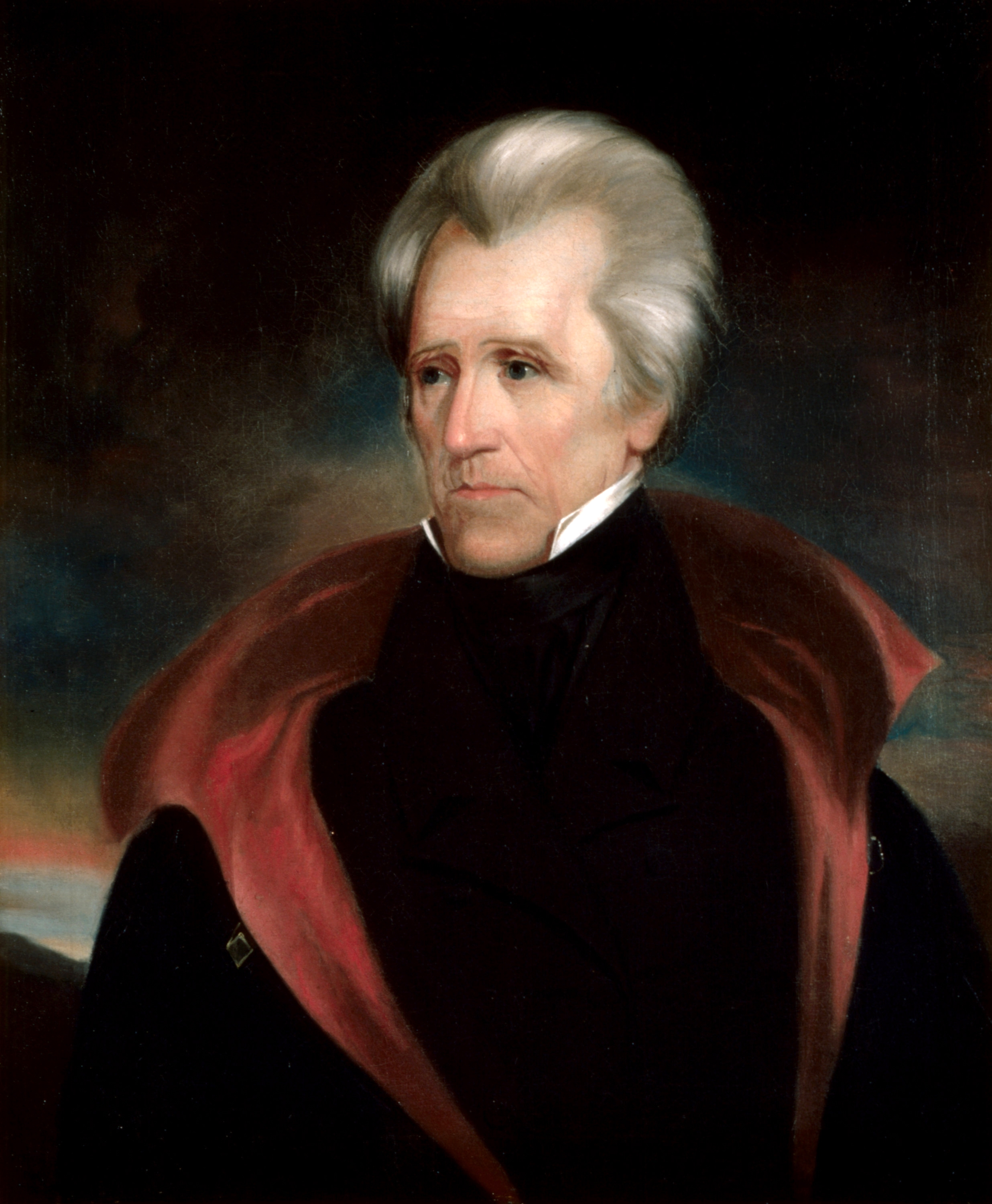
Andrew Jackson, a Poundian hero because of his opposition to the Bank of the United States.

- Andrew Jackson – President of the U.S. who opposed establishment of the Bank of the United States. – **Cantos LXXXVIII, LXXXIX, C**
- Henry James – In his 1918 essay Henry James (written as the introduction to a James special issue of the Little Review that Pound edited to mark the novelist's death), Pound describes James as a "hater of tyranny…against oppression, against all the sordid petty personal crushing oppression, the domination of modern life". – Canto VII: James' conversation remembered in terms reminiscent of the 1918 essay. The phrase "gli occhi onesti e tarde" ("with dignified and slow eyes") echoes Dante's description of Sordello in Purgatorio VI and is used in the canto, the essay, and Pound's 1918 short poem Moeurs Contemporaines. – **Cantos LXXIV, LXXIX**
- John Jay – one of the ministers involved in treaty negotiations with Britain and France. – **Canto LXV**
- Thomas Jefferson – **Cantos XXXI – XXXIV** and **LXII – LXXI**
- John Jenkins – **Canto LXXXI**
- Ben Jonson – 17th-century English poet. – The line "Or Swansdown ever" from his Have you seen but a whyte Lilie grow is also quoted in his 1918 essay The Hard and Soft in French Poetry – **Canto LXXIV.**
- James Joyce – **Canto LXXIV, LXXVII**
- Julia Domna – Wife of Septimius Severus – **Canto XCIV**
- Justinian code – Canto LXXXVII: Viewed as imperfect – **Cantos C, CXVI**

== K ==
- Kublai Khan – In his 1920 essay Kublai Khan and his Currency, Pound expresses his views on paper money as a means of controlling credit to the detriment of the public and quotes the passages from The Travels of Marco Polo that he uses in The Cantos – **Canto XVIII**
- King Kati – **Canto XCIII**
- Sir William Keith – Lieutenant-governor of Pennsylvania and Delaware – Canto LXXI
- William Rufus de Vane King – Jacksonian senator and Minister to France 1844–1846 – **Canto LXXXIX**
- Rudyard Kipling – **Canto LXXXII**
- Kuanon (Kuan Yin) – Japanese goddess of mercy – **Cantos LXXIV, XC, CX**

== L ==
- Jules Laforgue – French poet – **Canto XCVI**
- Marie Laurencin – **Canto LXXX**
- Henry Laurens – First president of the Congress of Carolina who was captured by the British while sailing to Holland in 1780 to negotiate a loan, he was held prisoner in the Tower of London for 14 months. – **Canto LXVIII**
- John Law – Scottish economist and sometime Comptroller of the Finances of France. Like Pound, he believed that money was only a means of exchange that did not constitute wealth in itself. – **Canto CXIV**
- Henry Lawes – **Canto LXXXI**
- Layamon – 11th-century English poet. – Canto XCI: His Brut quoted, especially the hymn to the goddess Diana.
- League of Cambrai – **Canto LI**
- Fernand Léger – Canto XVI: On World War I
- Lenin – **Canto C**
- Pietro Leopoldo, Grand Duke of Tuscany and founder of the Monte de Paschi. – **Cantos XLIV, L, LII**
- Leucothea – See Homer above
- Sinclair Lewis – **Cantos LXXXIV, CXV**
- Wyndham Lewis – **Cantos LXXX, XCVIII, XCVI** (admiration for Byzantium)
- Linnaeus – The "Father of Taxonomy" – **Cantos CXIII, CXV, CXVI**
- Lombards – **Canto XCVI**
- Ambrogio Lorenzetti – **Canto XVL**
- Lyaeus – Epithet for Dionysus, "He who unties" – **Canto II**
- Lycurgus – Legendary ruler of Sparta – **Cantos LXVIII, LXXXVIII**

== M ==
- Nathaniel Macon – U.S. politician who was unsuccessful candidate for vice president of the United States in 1825. – **Canto LXXXIX**
- Joseph-Anna-Marie de Moyriac de Mailla – Jesuit historian whose work served as the basis for the China Cantos **LII – LXI**
- Sigismondo Pandolfo Malatesta – Condottiero and patron of the arts who is the first great culture hero to appear in The Cantos **Cantos VIII – XI**, **Canto XXI**
- Maria Theresia – Archduchess of Austria and queen of Hungary and Bohemia (1740–80), her thalers are perhaps the most famous silver coin in the world and were important in trade with the Levant. – **Cantos LXXXVI, LXXXIX**
- Jacques Maritain – **Cantos LXXVII, LXXX, XCI**
- Charles Martel – Carolingian ruler – **Canto XCVI**
- Charles Elkin Mathews – **Cantos LXXXII, C**
- John Masefield – **Canto LXXXII**
- Thomas McKean – American patriot who signed the Declaration of Independence – **Canto LXXI**
- Lorenzo de' Medici – Pound admired his poetry – **Canto LXXVIII**
- Medici bank – In his 1934 essay Date Line, Pound wrote: "Wherever you find a Medici, you find a loan at low interest, often at half that of their contemporaries." – **Cantos XXI, XLV, XIL, L**
- Mencius – Canto LXXVII: The archer and the bullseye, Cantos LXXVIII, LXXXII: Quoted on the Spring and Autumn – LXXXIII: "the nine fields", equity in government
- Abbas Mirza – (c. 1783–1833), prince of Persia who was famed for the simplicity of his lifestyle. – **Canto LXXXIX**
- Jacques de Molay Last Grand Master of the Templars who was executed for heresy and other charges. – **Cantos LXXXVII, XC**
- Money supply – passim
- Monte dei Paschi di Siena – Not-for-profit Sienese bank funded by natural productivity and much admired by Pound – **Cantos XLI, XLII, XLIII**.
- Federico da Montefeltro (Feddy) – Fought for the Papacy against Sigismondo Malatesta and later switched sides when the pope tried to take control of the Malatesta seat at Rimini – **Cantos VIII – XI**
- Simon de Montfort, 5th Earl of Leicester – **Canto LXXXIII**
- Montségur – Scene of final stages of the Albigensian Crusade – **Cantos XXIII, XLCIII**
- Moon – Either directly or via mythological exemplifications (usually goddesses), the moon represents light in its creative or mystical aspect in The Cantos. – passim
- Dwight L. Morrow – Sometime U.S. ambassador to Mexico. – **Canto LXXXVI**
- Mozart – **Cantos XXVI, LXXIX, CXIII, CXV**
- Musonius Rufus – **Canto XCIV**
- Benito Mussolini – Italian Fascist dictator admired by Pound. – **Cantos XXXIII, XIL** (found Pound's XXX Cantos "diverting"), **LXXIV, LXXVIII, Notes for CXVII et seq.**

== N ==
- Napoleon Bonaparte – **Cantos XCVII, C, CXI**
- Napoleon III – Canto LXXXV: Example of a bad ruler
- Neoplatonism
- Jules Nicole – Translator of the Book of the Prefect (or Eparch)
- Frederick North, Lord North – British Prime Minister during the American Revolution – **Canto LXXII**

== O ==
- Ocellus Lucanus – **Canto LXXXVII** "all things have neither a beginning nor an end'" – **Canto LXXXVII** – Cantos XCI, XCIII, XCVIII: "to build light".
- Odysseus – passim (see Homer)
- Andrew Oliver – **Canto LXIV**
- A. R. Orage – Editor of the New Age and friend of Pound – **Cantos XCVIII, CXI**
- James Otis – **Cantos LXII – LXXI**
- Ovid – In his 1928 essay, How to Read, Pound lists Ovid among the "inventors", or poets who were responsible for introducing something to the art that had never been done before. – **Cantos IV, VII, XVII, XX, LXXXV**
  - Sulmona – His birthplace – **Canto CXV**
  - Metamorphoses – Canto II: Atalanta ("Schoeney's daughter'"), Dionysus and the pirates – Canto XC: Stories of Arethusa and Alpheus, Baucis and Philemon
  - Fasti Cantos XCIII, XCVIII: "Est deus in nobis: agitante calescimus illo" ("There is a God in us, and we glow when he stirs us") quoted partially in each canto. The full quotation is given in Pound's 1956 Quotations from Richard of St Victor where it is set beside Richard's "Ignis quidquid in nobis est" ("There is a certain fire within us").

== P ==
- Giovanni Pacelli (Pope Pius XII) – **Canto LXXIII**.
- Lord Palmerston – Canto LXXXIX: The right of search and the Anglo-American War of 1812 to 1814.
- Pandects – **Canto XCIV**
- William Patterson – 17th century Scottish entrepreneur who first proposed the establishment of the Bank of England – **Canto XVIL**.
- Paulus the deacon – Historian of the Lombards was born in 725 – **Canto XCVII**
- John Penn – U.S. politician – **Canto LXVII**
- Pentheus – Banned the worship of Dionysus in Thebes; grandson of Cadmus; mortal cousin of Dionysus – **Canto II**
- Thomas Pereyra (Pereira in Pound's spelling) (1645–1708) – French Jesuit missionary and companion of Jean François Gerbillon. – **Canto LIX**.
- Persephone – **Cantos LXXXIII, XCIII** (via Dante reference at end of canto)
- Petronius – Canto LXIV: His Satyricon quoted.
- Philostratus – Canto XCIV: His life of Apollonius extensively quoted, Canto XCVIII: "out of Egypt, medicine" quoted in Greek
- Francis Picabia – Quoted on the futility of the First World War – **Canto XCVII**
- Piero della Francesca – **Canto VIII**
- Charles Cotesworth Pinckney – American politician and military leader during the Revolution who supported the union of the states. – **Canto LXIII**
- Pindar – **Canto IV** (opening line), **Canto LXXXIII** (hudor [water])
- Thomas Pinckney
- Pippin III (Pippin/Pepin the Short) – Carolingian ruler – **Canto XCVI**
- Luigi Pirandello – **Canto XCV**
- Victor Plarr **Cantos LXXIV, C**
- George Gemistos Plethon – **Cantos VIII, LXXXIII**
- Plotinus – **Cantos XV, XCVIII, C**
- Poema de Mio Cid – Medieval Spanish poem discussed by Pound in his 1910 book The Spirit of Romance – **Cantos III, XX** ("And the King said:/'God what a woman!/My God what a woman'" and surrounding fragments)
- James K. Polk – Jacksonian president of the U.S. – **Cantos LXXXVII, C**
- Dorothy Pound – Pound's wife – One of those who "do not cook" **Cantos LIV, LXXXI**
- Propertius – quoted in **Canto VII** "quoscumque smaragdos, quosve dedit flavo lumine, chrysolithos" ("whatever emeralds, or yellow-glowing topazes"), **Canto XX** "Possum ego naturae non meminisse tuae" ("your nature cannot be forgotten"); also "Qui son Properzio ed Ovidio" ("It is Propetian and Ovidian")
- Proteus – A Greek sea-god with the power of prophecy and the ability to change shape – **Canto II**
- Provençal literature – passim
- Michael Psellos – Byzantine Neoplatonist – **Cantos XXIII, C**
- Raphael Pumpelly – American explorer who made the first extensive survey of the Gobi desert, as a result of which he developed a theory of secular rock disintegration. He was influenced by Louis Agassiz. – **Canto XCIII**

== R ==
- John Randolph of Roanoke – 19th century U.S. politician and leader of opposition to the Bank of the United States – **Cantos LXXXVII, LXXXIX, XC**
- Charles, comte de Rémusat – **Canto C**
- Renaissance – passim
- Rhea – Mother of Zeus, who is generally depicted between two lions or on a chariot pulled by lions. **Canto XCI**
- Richard of St. Victor – In his 1910 book The Spirit of Romance, Pound wrote "the keenly intellectual mysticism of Richard of St. Victor fascinates me". In 1956, he selected and translated Quotations from Richard of St Victor – Canto LXXXV: On contemplation as active intellect – Canto XC: "ubi amor, ibi oculuc est" ("where love is, there is the eye") and "quam in nobis divinae reperietur imago" ("of which an image of the divine is found in us") (slightly misquoting a passage given in the Quotations) – Cantos **XCII, XCIV**
- Joseph F. Rock – American botanist and explorer who described and filmed many Chinese and Tibetan rituals – **Canto CX**
- Roman Empire – **Canto XCVI**
- Franklin D. Roosevelt – **Cantos LXXXV, XCVII**
- Rothschild family – Jewish bankers – **Canto LII**
- Walter Rummel – Musician who worked with Pound on recovering settings of Troubadour songs. – **Canto LXXX**
- Benjamin Rush – Signatory of the Declaration of Independence – **Cantos XCIV, XCVII**

== S ==
- Sacred Edict – Maxims on good government by the Chinese emperor K'ang Hsi – **Cantos XCVIII, XCIX** – Thrones
- George Santayana – **Canto LXXXI** – Canto C: Fellow admirer of Mussolini; Pound also referred to his ontological theory
- John Singer Sargent – **Canto LXXXI**
- Sappho – In his 1928 essay, How to Read, Pound lists Sappho among the "inventors", or poets who were responsible for introducing something to the art that had never been done before – **Cantos III – VII, LXXIV, LXXVI, LXXX**
- Hjalmar Schacht – **Canto LII**
- Schoeney – Father of Atalanta. The phrase "Schoeney's daughter" is lifted from a passage in Arthur Golding's translation of the Metamorphoses which is quoted in Pound's 1917 essay Notes on Elizabethan Classicists. – **Canto II**
- Jacopo Sellaio – Italian artist whose Venus Pound admired. – **Cantos LXXX, XCIII**
- Septimius Severus – **Canto XCIV**
- William Shakespeare – Discussed distributive justice. – **Canto XCIII**
- William Shirley – colonial governor of Massachusetts 1741–1745 and 1754–1759. – **Canto LXXVII**
- Sirens – **Canto XC**
- John Skelton – **Canto C**
- Adam Smith – Economist – Canto XL: on trade organisations as a conspiracy against the public.
- Hieronymus Soncinus – Renaissance printer based in the town of Fano. He printed the works of Petrarch. – **Canto XXX**
- Song of Roland – Canto XX: "tant mare fustes/so unlucky were you" quoted from verse XXVII of the French romance
- Sordello – Troubadour poet and subject of Robert Browning's long poem of that name. He appears in Dante's Purgatorio. – **Canto II** – Canto VII: Dante's description of him applied to Henry James – **Canto XXXVI**
- Joseph Stalin – **Canto LXXXIV**
- Stamp Act 1765 – **Canto LXIV**
- Lincoln Steffens – **Cantos XVI, LXXXIV**
- Mount Sumeru – Buddhist holy mountain – **Canto CX**
- Sun (frequently as Helios) – Either directly or via mythological exemplifications (usually gods), the sun represents light in its active, political, or social aspect in The Cantos. – passim
- Emanuel Swedenborg – Canto XCIV: "of society"
- Algernon Charles Swinburne – **Canto LXXXII**
- Arthur Symons – **Canto LXXX**

== T ==
- Talleyrand – Canto LXXXI: Curbing Bismarck's ambitions at the Congress of Vienna, Canto CXI: and Napoleon
- Tammuz – **Canto XVIIL**
- F. W. Tancred – **Canto LXXXII**
- John Taylor ( of Caroline) Served as a colonel under Patrick Henry – **Canto LXVII**
- Terracina – Seaside town between Rome and Naples which was formerly the location of a temple to Venus (or possibly Jupiter). In his 1930 essay Credo, Pound wrote "Given the material means I would replace the statue of Venus on the cliffs of Terracina." – **Cantos XXXIX, LXXIV, XCI**.
- Thales of Miletus – Pound was interested in his exploitation of a monopoly of the olive presses having predicted a bumper harvest, a story related by Aristotle. – **Canto LXXXVIII**
- Theocritus – **Canto LXXXI**
- Adolphe Thiers – 19th-century French statesman, journalist, and historian of the French Revolution. – **Canto XCIX**
- Tiresias – **Cantos I, LXXXIII**
- Titian – **Canto XXV**
- Toba Sojo – 11th-century Japanese artist – **Canto CX**
- Alexis de Tocqueville – **Canto LXXXVIII**
- Charles-Thomas Maillard De Tournon (1668–1710) – Savoyard who served as Papal legate to India and ended his life as a prisoner in Macau for attempting to abolish the Confucian rites. **Canto LX**
- Troubadours – **Cantos IV, VI, VII, XX, XXIX**
- Samuel Tucker – Captain of the ship that brought John Adams to France in 1778. – **Canto LXV**
- John Tyler – He was the first Vice President to be elevated to the office of President by the death of his predecessor. Tyler vetoed Henry Clay's bill to establish a National Bank. – **Cantos LXXXVII, C**
- Tyro – Mythological figure who had two sons, Neleus and Pelias by Poseidon – **Cantos II, XC**

== U ==
- Messier Undertree/Toyotomi Hideyoshi – **Cantos LVI, LVIII**
- United States Federalist Party
- Count Usedom – **Canto C**
- Usury – passim, especially **Canto XLV** (With usura), which is a litany on the evils of usury and its impact on culture and the arts, Canto XLVI: with reference to the Bank of England, **Cantos XLVIII, LI**
- Nicolò da Uzzano – Opponent of the Medici – **Canto XLI**

== V ==
- Roberto Valturio, d. 1489 – Italian engineer and scholar, author of De Re Militari (1472), active at the court of Sigismondo Pandolfo Malatesta – **Cantos IX, XI, XXVI, LIV, LVII**
- Arthur Hendrick Vandenberg U.S. Senator – **Canto LXXXIV**
- Benedetto Varchi – Italian poet and historian of Florence – **Canto LXXXVII**
- Vegetation cults – **Canto XLVII**
- Velázquez – **Canto LXXX**
- Venice – **Canto XVII** (as a stone forest growing out of the water) – **Canto XXV** (extracts from the Book of the Council Major) – **Cantos XXVI, XXXV** (trade) – **Canto LI** (League of Cambrai) – **Cantos LXXVI, LXXVIII** (Church of San Zeno: see Arnaut Daniel above) – **Canto CXVI** (Torcello)
- Bernart de Ventadorn – Troubadour poet. – Canto VI: In connection with Eblis – Cantos XX, XCII: "And if I see her not/no sight is worth the beauty/of my thought." – Canto XCIII: "Tristan l'amador" passage quoted
- Charles Gravier, comte de Vergennes – **Cantos LXV, LXVIII**
- Victor Emmanuel II of Italy (1820–1878) – He was the first king of a united Italy, a title he held from 1861 to 1878. **Canto LXI**
- François Villon – 15th-century French poet who Pound admired. In his 1928 essay, How to Read, Pound lists Villion among the "inventors", or poets who were responsible for introducing something to the art that had never been done before. – **Canto XCVII**
- Leone Vivante (1887–1970) – Jewish-Italian philosopher, who lived in Villa Solaia, Siena; author of Notes on the Originality of Thought (1927); English Poetry and Its Contribution to the Knowledge of a Creative Principle (1950, with a preface by T. S. Eliot) – **Canto LII**
- Voltaire – **Canto XCIII**

== W ==
- Edward Wadsworth – Vorticist painter – **CXI**
- Captain Joseph Wadsworth – Hero of the Charter Oak incident – **Canto XCVII**
- Edmund Waller – **Canto LXXXI**
- Wanjina – Australian rain god. He made things by naming them, but made too many, thereby creating clutter and his father sewed up his mouth to stop him. As a result, he symbolises one deprived of free speech for Pound. – **Canto LXXIV** where he is echoed by the Chinese phrase "Ouan Jin", a "man without education".
- Mercy Warren – American writer and sister of James Otis. She was a close friend of Abigail Adams, wife of John. – **Canto LXX**
- Christian Wechel – publisher in 1538 of Andreas Divus's Latin translation of the Odyssey – **Canto I**. Wechel also published a celebrated edition of Roberto Valturio's De Re Militari (1532), a copy of which is on view in the Chester Beatty Library. In "Andreas Divus" (1918, reprinted as "Translators of Greek" in Literary Essays), Pound wrote that he bought Wechel's Homeric volume in Paris in "1906, 1908, or 1910".
- Harry Dexter White – U.S. President Franklin D. Roosevelt's economist and founder of the International Monetary Fund – **Canto LXXXV**
- Walt Whitman – **Canto LXXXII**
- John Williams – U.S. politician and judge – **Canto LXV**
- William Carlos Williams – **Canto LXXVIII**
- Wendell Willkie – **Canto LXXVII**
- Oliver Wolcott Signer of the Declaration of Independence – Adams Cantos
- W. E. Woodward – American historian who promoted a secular view of George Washington – **Canto LXXXVI**
- William Wordsworth – **Canto LXXXIII**
- Writ of Assistance – **Canto LXIII**
- George Wythe – American patriot who signed the Declaration of Independence and law professor whose students included Thomas Jefferson and Henry Clay – **Canto LXV**

== X ==
- XYZ Affair – **Canto LXX**

== Y ==
- William Butler Yeats – Pisan Cantos passim – **Cantos XCVI** (admiration for Byzantium), **XCVIII, CXIII, CXIV**

== Z ==
- Zagreus – See Dionysus
- Zeus – **Cantos LXXI, XC**
- John Joachim Zubly – Swiss-born preacher who, during the American War of Independence, betrayed the plans of the popular party to the British – **Canto LXV**

== Sources ==
Print

- Ackroyd, Peter. Ezra Pound and his World (Thames and Hudson, 1980). ISBN 0-500-13069-8
- Bacigalupo, Massimo. The Forméd Trace: The Later Poetry of Ezra Pound (Columbia University Press, 1980). ISBN 0-231-04456-9
- Cookson, William. A Guide to the Cantos of Ezra Pound (Anvil, 1985). ISBN 0-89255-246-8
- Edwards, John Hamilton and William W. Vasse. Annotated Index to the Cantos of Ezra Pound (University of California Press, 1959). LC Catalogue No.: 57-10500.
- Glenn, Edgar M. "Pound and Ovid". Paideuma, vol. 10, no. 3, 1981: pp. 625–634.
- Kearns, George. Ezra Pound: The Cantos (Cambridge University Press, 1989)
- Kenner, Hugh. The Pound Era (Faber and Faber, 1975 edition). ISBN 0-571-10668-4
- Nadel, Ira B. (ed.). The Cambridge Companion to Ezra Pound (Cambridge University Press, 1999)
- Sullivan, J. P. (ed). Ezra Pound (Penguin Critical Anthologies, 1970). ISBN 0-14-080033-6
- Terrell, Carroll F. A Companion to The Cantos of Ezra Pound (University of California Press, 1980). ISBN 0-520-08287-7
- Tryphonopoulos, Demetres P. and Stephen J. Adams (eds.). The Ezra Pound Encyclopedia (Greenwood Press, 2005). ISBN 0-313-30448-3
- Wilhelm, James L. The Later Cantos of Ezra Pound (Walker and Company, 1977).
- Woodward, Anthony. Ezra Pound and the Pisan Cantos (Routledge & Kegan Paul, 1980)

Online

- A Hypervortext of Ezra Pound's Canto LXXXI Captured January 4, 2005.
- Bibliography of Japan in English-Language Verse Captured March 21, 2005.
