= Dollie Radford =

English poet and writer

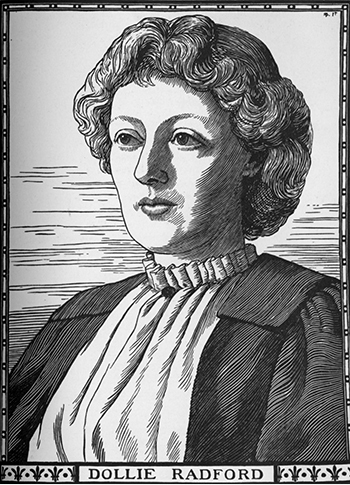
- Woodcut of Radford by Robert Bryden, 1902
- Born: Caroline Maitland; December 3, 1858; London, United Kingdom of Great Britain and Ireland
- Died: February 7, 1920 (aged 61)
- Education: Queen's College, London
- Spouse: Ernest Radford
- Children: 3
- Writing career
- Language: English
- Period: Long nineteenth century

Caroline Maitland (1858–1920) was an English poet and writer. She worked under the name "Dollie Radford" after she married Ernest Radford.

== Life ==
Maitland was born in London in 1858. In 1880 she met her future husband in the British Museum Reading Room and they continued to meet at Karl Marx's house. She married Ernest Radford in 1883, and wrote as Dollie Radford. They had three children, one being the doctor and writer Maitland Radford. Her grandchildren include the town and park planner Ann MacEwen.

Her friends included her sister in law Ada Wallas and the socialist Eleanor Marx, whom she knew through a Shakespeare reading group attended by Karl Marx, and Amy Levy. Her papers are housed at the William Andrews Clark Memorial Library at UCLA and at the British Library. Many of the British Library manuscripts have been digitized and can be viewed at Europeana.

Her husband was a member of the Rhymers' Club, but Maitland could not join because of sexual discrimination.

== Works ==
- A Light Load (1891)
- Songs for Somebody (1893)
- Good Night (1895)
- Songs and Other Verses (1895)
- One Way of Love: an Idyll (1898)
- The Poet’s Larder and Other Stories (1904)
- The Young Gardeners’ Kalendar (1904)
- Sea-Thrift (1904)
- In Summer Time (1905)
- Shadow-Rabbit, with Gertrude M. Bradley (1906)
- A Ballad of Victory and other poems (1907)
- William Allingham; A Diary (1907) co-editor with Helen Allingham
- Poems (1910)
