= Arthur E. Popham =

20th century British art historian

Hugh Popham
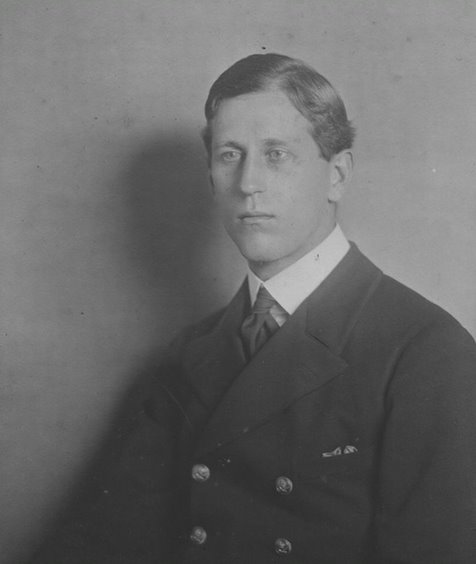
- Born: Arthur Ewart Hugh Popham; 22 March 1889; Plymouth, England
- Died: 8 December 1970; Islington, London, England
- Other name: List: Arthur E. Popham; A. E. Popham; Arthur Ewart Hugh Popham; Hugh Popham
- Education: Cambridge University
- Occupation: Art historian
- Spouses: Brynhild Olivier (m. 1912–1924) Rosalind Thornycroft (m. 1926–1970)
- Children: Hugh Anthony Popham; Anne Olivier Bell; Tristram Popham
- Parents: Arthur Frederick Popham; Florence Amelia Radford
- Relatives: Ernest Radford (uncle); Ada Radford Wallas (aunt)

Arthur E. (Hugh) Popham, CB, FBA (22 March 1889 – 8 December 1970) was a British art historian, mainly focused on Italian art. Most of his life he worked at the British Museum and became especially renowned for his catalogue work. He was Keeper of Prints and Drawings from 1945 to his retirement from the museum in 1954.

== Personal life ==
He was born Arthur Ewart Hugh Popham in Plymouth, England on 22 March 1889, as the only son of Arthur Frederick Popham and Florence Amelia Radford. His mother was sister to the poet Ernest Radford and the writer Ada Radford Wallas.

He was educated at Cambridge University, at King's College. He duly graduated MA in 1908. He was associated with Rupert Brooke's circle of Neo-pagans and the Bloomsbury Group.

He married Brynhild Olivier on 3 October 1912 and the couple had three children: Hugh Anthony, Anne Olivier (later: Mrs. Quentin Bell) and Tristram. They divorced in 1924, when this was still a matter of some social consequence and required a hearing in court. He married Rosalind Baynes (née Thornycroft) in 1926.

He died in Islington, London in 1970. At the time of death, his address was 4 Canonbury Place, London N1. At Probate on 16 February 1971, his estate was stated as £4,967.

== Career ==
In 1912, Popham joined the Department of Prints and Drawings of the British Museum. In 1933, he was promoted to deputy keeper. From 1945 to 1954, he served as Keeper of Prints and Drawings (i.e. head of the department). On retirement, he was appointed a Companion of the Order of the Bath (CB).

At the outbreak of the First World War in 1914, Popham joined the Royal Naval Air Service. During his service, he was awarded the French Croix de Guerre. He moved to the Royal Air Force upon its creation in 1918 with the rank of captain. During the war, he served in Europe, Egypt, and Palestine.

== Selected works ==
- Arthur E. Popham: Catalogue of the Drawings of Parmigianino. 3 Vols. New Haven & London: Yale University Press 1971.

== Bibliography ==
- Shaw, James Byam (2010). "Popham, Arthur Ewart [Hugh] (1889–1970)". Oxford Dictionary of National Biography. Revised by Christopher Lloyd (online ed.). Oxford University Press. doi:10.1093/ref:odnb/35576. (Subscription, Wikipedia Library access or UK public library membership required.)
- Shaw, James Byam (20 April 2016). "Popham, Arthur Ewart, 1889-1970". Proceedings of the British Academy. 57.
- British Museum (19 May 1933). "Appointments" (PDF). The London Gazette: 3368.
- Central Chancery of the Orders of Knighthood (1 January 1954). "Companions of the Order" (PDF). The London Gazette: 4.
- Gere, John (9 December 1970). "Mr A E Popham: Authority on old master drawings". The Times (Obituary).
- "The Papers of Hugh and Brynhild (Olivier) Popham". Janus. Cambridge University Library. 2008.
- "Arthur Ewart Popham". The British Museum.
- "Find a will. Index to wills and administrations (1858-1996)". Calendars of the Grants of Probate and Letters of Administration. The National Archives.
