= Ernest Radford =

English poet, critic, and socialist

Ernest William Radford (1857–1919) was an English poet, critic and socialist. He was a follower of William Morris, and one of the organisers in the Arts and Crafts Movement; he acted as secretary to the Arts and Crafts Exhibition Society.

He was also one of the Rhymers' Club group of poets of the 1890s, contributing to the two anthologies they produced. He married Caroline Maitland in 1883 (1858–1920), generally known as Dollie Radford, and also a poet and writer.

== Early life ==
He was the son of George David Radford, a draper in Plymouth; the writer Ada Wallas, was his sister. Another sister, Florence Amelia, was the mother of Arthur Ewart Popham. He was educated at Amersham Hall school, near Reading, Berkshire. He matriculated at Trinity Hall, Cambridge in 1874, graduating LL.B. in 1878 and LL.M. in 1885. He entered the Middle Temple in 1876, and was called to the bar in 1880.

== Socialist connections ==
In the early 1880s, Radford associated with the circle of Karl Marx and his family. He published poems in 1884 in the journal Progress, edited by Edward Aveling, with Eleanor Marx and his future wife Caroline Maitland. In 1888 he had a position with the Arts and Crafts Exhibition Society, lasting to 1892.

Radford became an aesthetic socialist, in the style of William Morris. The Encyclopedia of Social Reform (1897) in its article "Art and Social Reform" cites Mary Bacon Ford, who reported that Radford was called the "Young Tribune", among Morris's supporters, and was one of the lecturers at Toynbee Hall. Through debates at the Morrises Radford met Walter Crane, who provided an illustration of one of his books. Crane, who was president of the while Radford was secretary, described him as an extension lecturer.

Radford and his wife both joined the Socialist League. Ernest Rhys, however, a good friend of Radford's, described him as a "casual disciple" of Morris, also a wit, effective speaker, and reviewer for the Pall Mall Gazette. The Radfords did move to Hammersmith, to be closer to the Morrises.

Radford was a close friend of George Bernard Shaw from 1885 for a number of years; they were introduced by William Archer. He became a Fabian Society member. With Shaw he later spoke in favour of the Fabian Arts Group, in 1907. He also participated in the Men and Women's Club of the later 1880s.

== Later life ==
As secretary convening the Rhymers' Club, Radford used his position in 1891 to invite the publisher Elkin Mathews. He later used Mathews to draw in W. B. Yeats as a literary ally.

From 1892 Radford suffered from mental illness, after a breakdown in which he threatened to shoot an editor who had rejected his work. Later in life he required Dollie's care.

== Works ==
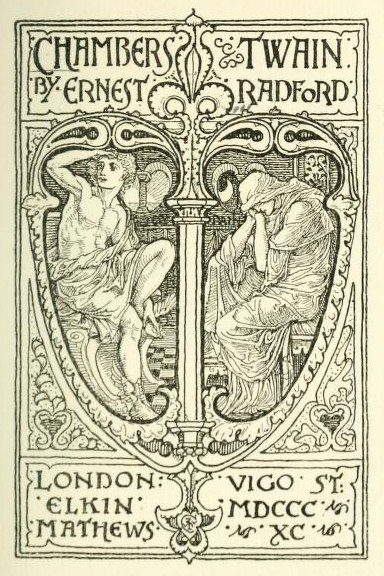
Frontispiece by Walter Crane to Chambers Twain (1890)

- From Heine (1882) translations
- Measured Steps (1884)
- The Poems of Walter Savage Landor (1889)
- Chambers Twain (1890)
- Old And New (1895)
- A Collection of Poems (1906) with others
- Dante Gabriel Rossetti (1908) biography
- Songs In The Whirlwind (1918) with Ada Radford
