= Grace Rhys =

Irish writer

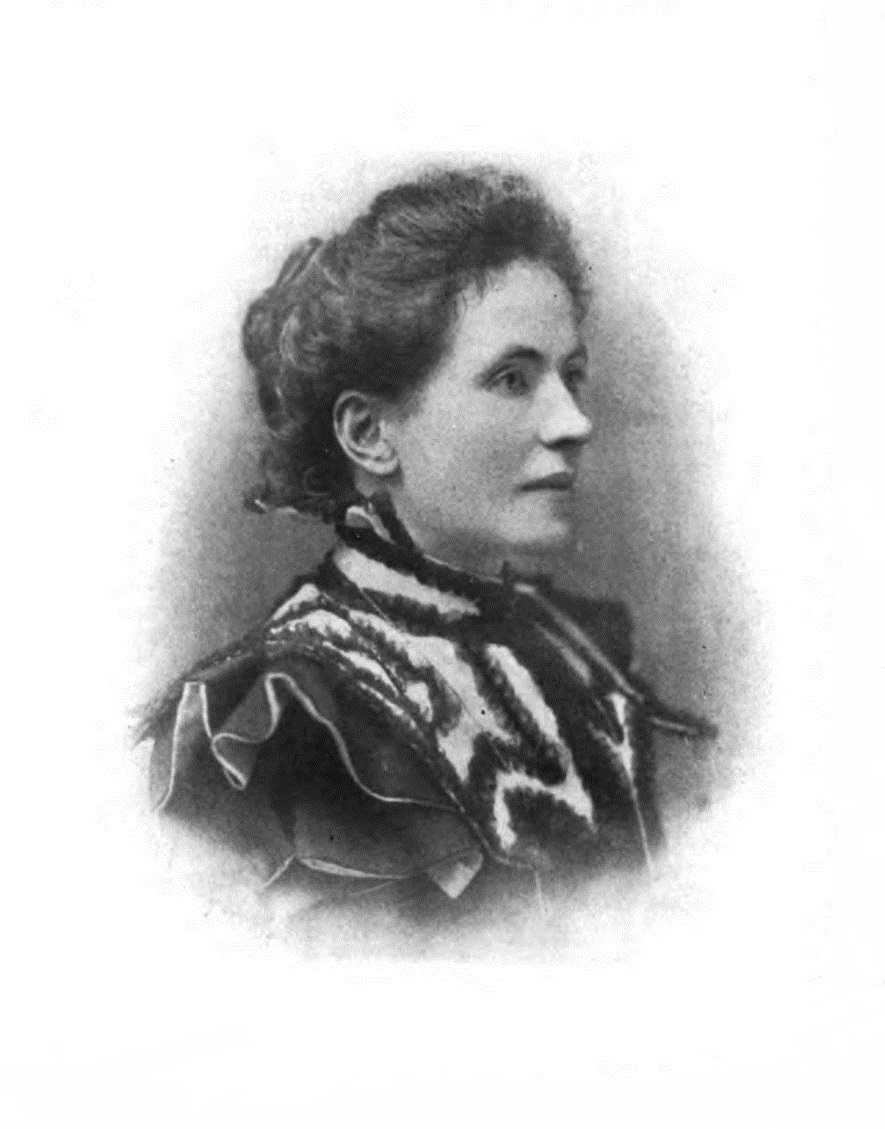
- Born: Grace Little; 12 July 1865; Boyle, County Roscommon, Ireland
- Died: 15 March 1929 (aged 63); Washington, D.C., United States
- Occupation: Novelist
- Spouse: Ernest Percival Rhys (m. 1891)
- Children: 3

Grace Rhys (née Little; 12 July, 1865–15 March, 1929) was an Irish writer.

== Biography ==
Grace Little was born in Boyle, County Roscommon on 12 July 1865. Joseph Bennet Little, her landowner father, lost his money through gambling and, after receiving a good education from governesses, she and her sisters had to move to London as adults to earn a living.

She was both the wife and literary companion to Ernest Percival Rhys whom she met at a garden party given by Yeats. They married on 5 January 1891, and had three children. The couple sometimes worked side by side in the British Museum. Her first novel, Mary Dominic, was published in 1898. Several of her stories have an Irish setting, including The Charming of Estercel (1904) set in Elizabethan Ireland, which was illustrated by Howard Pyle in Harper's Magazine.

Her other work includes The Wooing of Sheila (1901), The Bride (1909), and Five Beads on a String (1907), a book of essays. She also wrote poetry and books for children, and had a son and two daughters of her own.

The Rhyses were known for entertaining writers and critics at their London home on Sunday afternoons. Grace died from a heart attack at a hotel in Washington D.C. on 15 March 1929 while accompanying her husband on an American lecture tour.
