= Ye Olde Cheshire Cheese =

Listed pub in the City of London, England

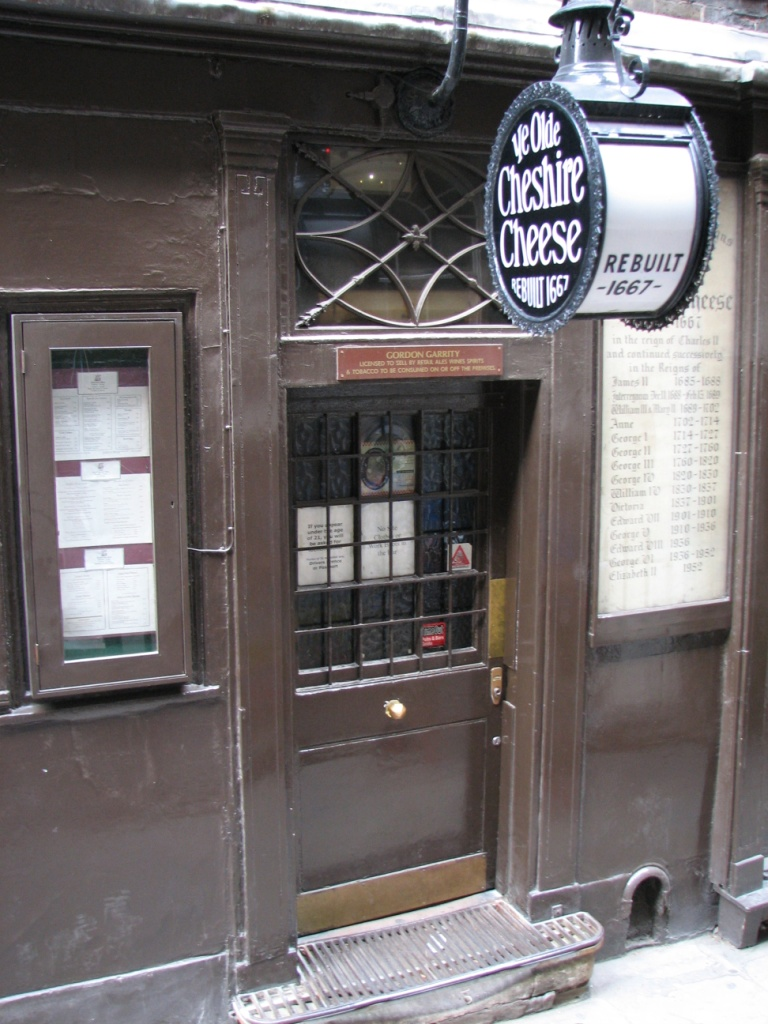
- Main entrance in 2006, with the names of England's monarchs since the pub's establishment listed to the right

General information
- Type: Public house
- Location: 145 Fleet Street, City of London, England
- Coordinates: 51.5143236°N 0.10716940°W
- Completed: c. 1667 (359 years ago)
- Owner: Samuel Smith's

Design and construction
- Designations

Listed Building – Grade II
- Official name: Ye Olde Cheshire Cheese public house
- Designated: 10 November 1977
- Reference no.: 1064662

Ye Olde Cheshire Cheese is a Grade II listed public house on Fleet Street in the City of London, England. Rebuilt in 1667 following the Great Fire of London, the building has an 18th-century frontage and was extended in the 19th century. Acquired by Samuel Smith's in the early 1990s, it is recognised by CAMRA for its historic interior, which is rated three stars on its National Inventory of Historic Pub Interiors. The pub is also known for its literary associations, with its regular patrons having included Charles Dickens, G. K. Chesterton and Mark Twain.

== History ==
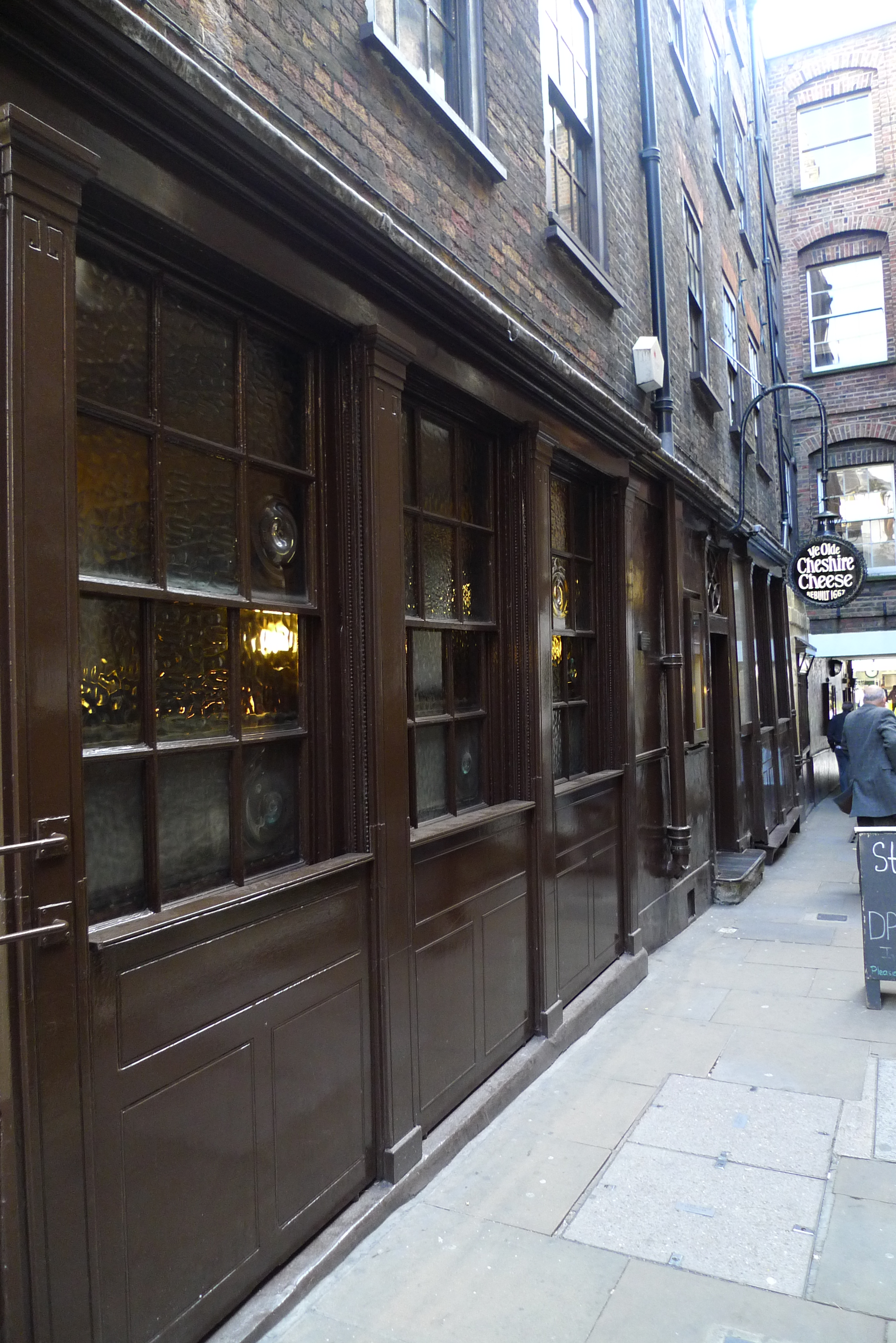
The pub stands in an alley off Fleet Street

The building dates from the late 17th century but has undergone substantial alterations. The yellow-brick frontage facing Fleet Street was probably added in the late 18th century and subsequently modified and raised in height during the 19th century. Rebuilt following the Great Fire of London, the public house is accessed via a narrow passage off Fleet Street, with a side entrance opening onto Wine Office Court.

On 10 November 1977, Ye Olde Cheshire Cheese was designated a Grade II listed building. After many years in private ownership, it was acquired by Yorkshire-based brewer Samuel Smith's in the early 1990s. Until 1992, the pub consisted of four rooms spread across three floors, together with cellar accommodation that included a small bar. During redevelopment in 1992, the building was extended to the east, creating additional drinking areas. Former offices and other rooms were converted into bars, and further space on the upper floors was brought into use. These changes increased the number of drinking areas to at least nine.

It was included in the Campaign for Real Ale (CAMRA)'s National Inventory of Historic Pub Interiors before the inventory's grading system was revised. Under the revised scheme, it is rated three stars and its interior is regarded as being "of outstanding national historic importance". As of July 2026, the freehold was owned by Samuel Smith's.

== Literary associations ==
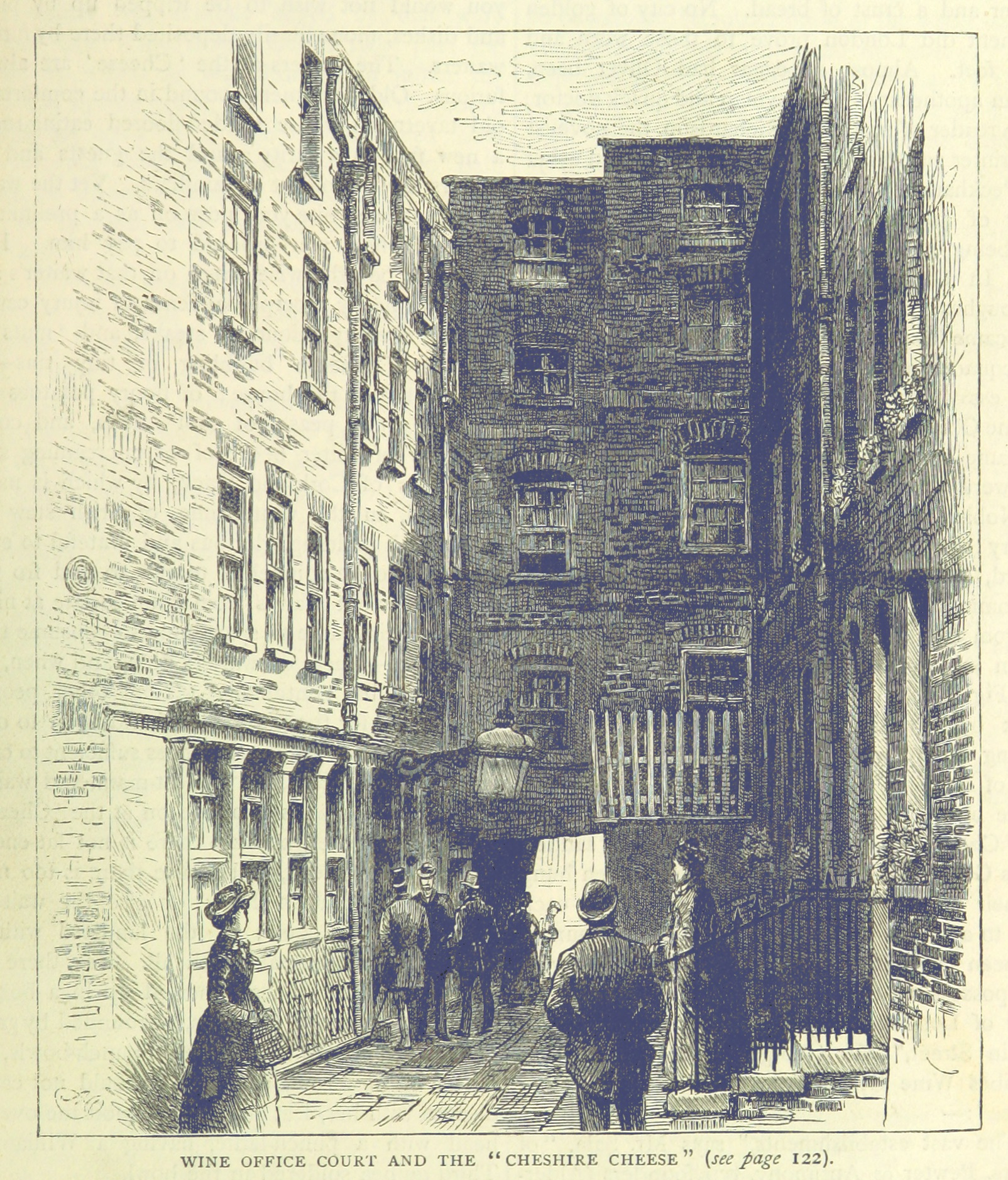
Ye Olde Cheshire Cheese in 1873

The literary figures: Oliver Goldsmith, Mark Twain, Alfred Tennyson, Sir Arthur Conan Doyle, G.K. Chesterton, P. G. Wodehouse and Samuel Johnson are all said to have been 'regulars'. However, there is no recorded evidence that Johnson ever visited the pub, only that he lived close by, at 17 Gough Square. At The Johnson Club supper, 13 December 1892, 'an eloquent gentleman, present, an Irish former MP, pointed out that when Johnson acted on his suggestion "let us take a walk down Fleet Street" the Cheshire Cheese must of necessity have been included among his places of call.'

A 1680 broadside ballad called A New Ballad of the Midwives Ghost tells a fantastical story of how a midwife haunted the house where she died until she was able to induce the new residents there to dig up the bones of some bastard children she had made away with and buried there. The final lines of the ballad insist upon the veracity of the tale and even that the children's bones may be seen for proof displayed at the Cheshire Cheese.

Charles Dickens had been known to use the establishment frequently, and it is alluded to in his A Tale of Two Cities: following Charles Darnay’s acquittal on charges of high treason, Sydney Carton invites him to dine, "drawing his arm through his own" Carton leads him to Fleet Street "up a covered way, into a tavern … where Charles Darnay was soon recruiting his strength with a good plain dinner and good wine". R. L. Stevenson mentions the Cheese in The Dynamiter (1885), 'a select society at the Cheshire Cheese engaged my evenings.' A Tale of Two Cities was in part the inspiration for the American children's book The Cheshire Cheese Cat by Carmen Agra Deedy, Randall Wright and Barry Moser, which is set in the pub.

The Cheshire Cheese pub appears in Anthony Trollope's novel Ralph the Heir, where one of the characters, Ontario Moggs, is described as speaking "with vigor at the debating club at the Cheshire Cheese in support of unions and the rights of man..."

Wodehouse, though so many of his characters were members of posh London clubs, often preferred the homey intimacy of the pub. In a letter to a friend he wrote, "Yesterday, I looked in at the Garrick at lunchtime, took one glance of loathing at the mob, and went off to lunch by myself at the Cheshire Cheese." The pub is mentioned by name in some of his books as well.

The Rhymers' Club was a group of London-based poets, founded in 1890 by W. B. Yeats and Ernest Rhys. Originally not much more than a dining club, it produced anthologies of poetry in 1892 and 1894. They met at the Cheshire Cheese and in the 'Domino Room' of the Café Royal.

R. Austin Freeman in his 1913 novel The Mystery of 31 New Inn describes a luncheon at the pub in some detail, including mention of the beef-steak pudding and 'the friendly portrait of the "great lexicographer" [Johnson] that beamed down...from the wall'.

According to the Betty Crocker cookbook, both Dickens and Ben Jonson dined on Welsh rarebit at this pub, although Jonson died almost a century before the dish is first known to have been recorded.

Soviet writer Boris Pilnyak visited the pub during his stay in London in 1923. He later wrote a story entitled "Staryi syr," ("old cheese" in Russian) a part of which takes place in the Cheshire Cheese Pub.

Agatha Christie wrote that her fictional detective Hercule Poirot dined with a new client at the Cheshire Cheese in her 1924 story The Million Dollar Bond Robbery, adding a description of "the excellent steak and kidney pudding of the establishment."

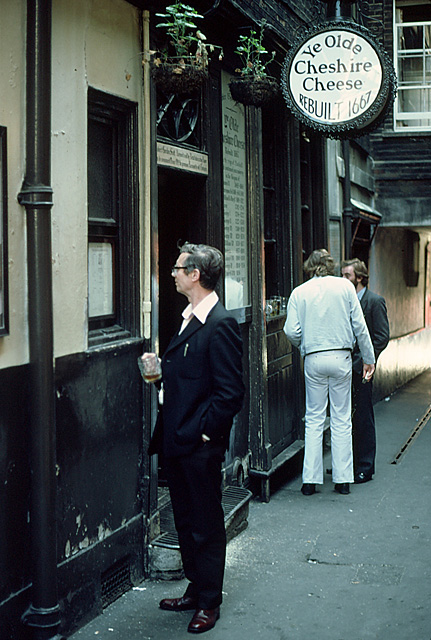
The pub in 1980

The founding meeting of the Medical Journalists' Association took place at the 'Cheese' on 1 February 1967. At that time, health journalism was in its infancy, and medical doctors who wrote articles under their own name could be reported to the General Medical Council. From an initial membership of 48, the MJA now represents around 500 journalists, broadcasters and editors.

Alexander Theroux's story "An English Railroad" is set in the Cheshire Cheese.

For around 40 years, Ye Olde Cheshire Cheese was associated with an African grey parrot named Polly. The bird lived in the bar area and was a prolific talker, known to shout out patrons favourite drink orders when they arrived on the premises. Famous for expletive laden outbursts, Polly was particularly adept at mimicking the popping sound of Champagne corks. Because of the pub's location near Fleet Street, events surrounding Polly became newsworthy local lore. When Polly died in 1926, around 200 newspapers across the world wrote obituaries, and the passing was announced on the radio. Polly was taxidermied and placed under a glass dome overlooking the bar, where it remains to this day.

In 1962, the pub gave the Museum of London a number of sexually explicit erotic plaster of Paris tiles recovered from an upper room. These tiles strongly suggest that the room was used as a brothel in the mid-18th century.

== Architecture ==
=== Exterior ===
The building has four storeys, with additional dormer windows in the slate roof. The Fleet Street frontage has three windows with curved brick arches above them and a shop at ground level. The side elevation facing Wine Office Court also has four storeys, with one wider window followed by six narrower windows. These openings appear to date from the mid-to-late 18th century and have red brick arches set into yellow brickwork. The ground floor retains continuous glazing and a doorway with a curved fanlight above.

=== Interior ===
The basement room in 2025

The pub retains several historic rooms and features, alongside alterations made during the 1992 expansion. The two principal rooms on the ground floor are situated on either side of the entrance passage.

The small public bar to the right has wall panelling thought to date from the 17th-century rebuilding, together with bench seating, a large fireplace and a Victorian counter. Historic notices above the entrance refer to the former serving arrangements, including a restriction on service to gentlemen.

The room to the left, known as the Chop Room, is a panelled dining area with fitted bench seating and a marble fireplace. A four-sided seating arrangement around a table forms a separate enclosed area, with curtains providing privacy. The bare wooden floor is traditionally covered with sawdust, a practice also maintained in the public bar and entrance passage.

On the first floor, the Williams Room retains 1930s wall panelling, a wooden fireplace surround and an original fireback. Its seating includes fixed benches and pew-style furniture. The room is now primarily used for private functions. An adjoining room, created in 1992, has matching panelling designed to replicate the earlier decoration.

The Johnson Room on the second floor is arranged as a two-part space and retains further 1930s panelling and built-in seating. Some of the seating incorporates numbered sections historically known as traps. Parts of the room have been altered, including areas formerly used for waiter service and kitchen access. The room is used as an additional dining area, principally at lunchtime.

The cellar accommodation includes a small room with a replacement flagstone floor, a narrow barrel-vaulted passage and a larger room with a three-bay vaulted ceiling. The larger cellar was fitted out as a bar in 1992. Other additions from the same period include a ground-floor bar at the rear and the Johnson Bar on the first floor. A private dining room was also established on the third floor, although it contains no historic fittings.

== See also ==
- List of pubs in London
