= Plarr's Lives of the Fellows =

Biographical dictionary

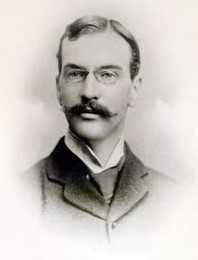
Victor Plarr

Plarr's Lives of the Fellows is a biographical dictionary of the fellows of the Royal College of Surgeons of England that contains over 10,000 obituaries.

The first printed volumes of the work were produced by Victor Plarr (1863–1929), who was the College's librarian from 1897 until his death, and published posthumously in 1930. The last of the nine printed volumes was published in 2005 and profiled all the fellows (FRCS) known to have died between the establishment of the College in 1843 and 2002. Since 2006, Plarr's has been published online and continues to be updated with new entries monthly.
