= Francis W. Tancred =

English poet

Francis Willoughby Tancred (21 February 1874 – 25 November 1925) was an English poet associated with the Poets' Club, a group of writers, established by T. E. Hulme, who were the forerunners of the Imagist movement. They carried out practical studies on Chinese poetry and haiku. Tancred's own influence on the genre has been relatively minor. He is one of the poets referred to in Ezra Pound's Cantos, LXXXII.

Tancred was born in New Zealand, the fifth child and second son of Thomas Selby Tancred, 8th Baronet (1840–1910), a mining and railway engineer who was a contractor for the Forth Railway Bridge and the Pretoria-Delagoa Bay railway. His grandfather, Sir Thomas Tancred, 7th Baronet, and great-uncle, Henry Tancred, migrated to New Zealand in 1850.

Tancred was a member of the London Stock Exchange. His only book, entitled Poems, was published by William Blackwood in 1907. He died in Hackney in 1925.
