= Andreas Divus =

16th-century Italian scholar and translator

Andreas Divus was a 16th-century Renaissance scholar, about whose life little is known; in Italian he is called Andrea Divo giustinopolitano or di Capodistria, i.e. surnamed Justinopolitanus in Latin and implying an origin at Koper, now in Slovenia, which was named at different times Aegida, Justinopolis and Capodistria. He is remembered for his Latin translations of Homer; but this versio Latina, in the view of modern scholarship, may have been his editorial version of a product of a tradition going back over a century of Latin translations for "crib" (reading aid) purposes.

== Translations ==
His Latin translations of Homer published in 1537 (Venice) were extremely literal and ad verbum (i.e. word for word). While this was the first published version of the Iliad and Odyssey in Latin, the originality of the translation of Divus has been questioned: there are very close parallels with a much earlier translation by Leontius Pilatus. They were designed to be read with the Greek originals. There were two Venice editions of 1537, by Jacob a Burgofrancho and by Melchior Sessa; they share an introduction by Pier Paolo Vergerio, born at Capodistria.

They were later republished by the jurist Obertus Giphanius (Hubrecht van Giffen, 1534–1604) and then used by Jean de Sponde (Spondanus) in his 1583 Homer commentary on Greek and Latin versions. The Greek was the 1572 (Strassburg) edition of Giphanius. What Spondanus included for Latin was not in fact the original translation of Divus, but a 1570 Geneva revision of it, with substantial changes.

They were used by George Chapman in his translations of the Iliad and Odyssey. In fact Chapman is considered to have used the Homer edition by de Sponde, which had parallel Greek and Latin text (the Latin derived from Divus), together with a Greek lexicon attributed to Johannes Scapula, a collaborator of the printer Henri Estienne. It has been said that Chapman's knowledge of Greek was not strong enough to resist entirely the Latin of Divus, with infelicitous results.

Divus was also used more directly by Ezra Pound in his long poem The Cantos, in particular for the opening Canto I ("Lie quiet Divus. I mean, that is Andreas Divus, In officina Wecheli, 1538, out of Homer"). The end of Canto I also references Latin translations of the Homeric Hymns published with the original translations of Divus, these being by Georgius Dartona known as Cretensis (the Cretan).
