= Southampton Dock strike of 1890 =

The 1890 Southampton Dock strike took place in Southampton, England, September, 1890.

The closing years of the 1880s saw a resurgence of trade unionism amongst merchant seamen, dockers and other unskilled workers. A notable victory was scored by London dockers during the famous London dock strike of 1889, in which the dockers were able to win a rate of 6d, known colloquially as the 'dockers' tanner'. Later that year, a branch of the Dockers' Union was formed in Southampton. In part this was an effort by the union to prevent Southampton men being used to break strikes in London, as had occurred on a limited basis during the 1889 strike. However, as the local branch grew, pressure mounted to improve wages in Southampton itself and to win the dockers' tanner for Southampton men.

Towards the end of August 1890, the Southampton Dock Company and the various shipping firms agreed to grant wage increases of 1d an hour. However, the Royal Mail Steam Packet Company, which paid lower rates than the other principal firms, refused to bring its rates into line with the other companies. All of the employers, meanwhile, refused to grant official recognition to the Dockers' Union and the National Union of Seamen. Because of these two issues, a strike was declared on 7 September. Unlike the London Dock Strike, the strike in Southampton was marked by a certain amount of public disorder. Blacklegs from Portsmouth arriving at the railway station were attacked and large crowds gathered daily in the streets around the docks and, leading to fears of rioting. In response the Mayor requested assistance from the Home Office. The West Yorkshire Regiment was called in from Portsmouth, and the Mayor read the riot act. In the event, however, troops were not deployed, and streets such as Canute Road were instead cleared with the aid of the local fire-brigade, who opened their hoses on the crowds.

The strike was called off on 15 September after the London-based executives of the Dockers and Seamen's Unions announced that they would not make the strike official, or release union funds for strike pay. This decision caused great resentment and resulted in the collapse of the Dockers' Union in the town. One lasting impact of the strike was that it led to the formation of a Southampton Trades Council to coordinate union action in disputes.
