= Victor Plarr =

Victor Gustave Plarr
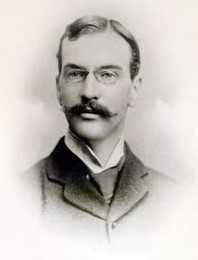
- Born: 21 June 1863; France
- Died: 29 January 1929 (aged 67)
- Education: Worcester College
- Occupation: Poet

Victor Gustave Plarr (21 June 1863 – 28 January 1929) was an English poet; he is probably best known for the poem Epitaphium Citharistriae.

== Life ==
He was born near Strasbourg, France, of a French father from Alsace, Gustave Plarr, and an English mother, Mary Jane Tomkins, third daughter of the banker Samuel Tomkins. He was brought up in Scotland and England after his family moved at the time of the Franco-Prussian War. He was educated at Madras College, St Andrews and Tonbridge School. He matriculated at the University of Oxford in 1882. He went on to read history at Worcester College, graduating B.A. in 1886.

Plarr worked as a librarian, first (from 1890) at King's College London, then at the Royal College of Surgeons of England from 1897 until his death. The following year, the first two volumes of Lives of the Fellows of the Royal College of Surgeons were published under the editorship of D'Arcy Power. Often known as Plarr's Lives of the Fellows, the biographies of the original 300 fellows are considered an early social history of English medicine.

In 1891 Plarr edited the 13th edition of Men of the Time, changing its title to Men and Women of the Time.

Plarr was a founding member of the Rhymers' Club. A generally uncongenial figure, he was befriended in 1909 by Ezra Pound, who enjoyed Plarr's tales of the "decadent nineties".

== Works ==
- In the Dorian Mood (1896)
- A School History of Middlesex including London (1905) (with Francis W. Walton)
- The Tragedy of Asgard (1905)
- Ernest Dowson 1888-1897 (1914)
- Lives of the Fellows of the Royal College of Surgeons (1930)
