= Ada Wallas =

English writer and teacher

- Born: Ada Radford; 10 December 1859; Plymouth, England, United Kingdom of Great Britain and Ireland
- Died: 12 October 1934 (aged 74); Chelsea, England, United Kingdom
- Education: Plymouth High School for Girls; Newnham College

Ada Wallas or Ada (or "Audrey") Radford (10 December 1859 – 12 October 1934) was an English writer and teacher.

== Life ==
Wallas was born in Plymouth in 1859. Her father was George David Radford who was a partner in a drapers in Mannamead. Her mother Catherine Agnes had ten children and Wallas was the penultimate. Her non-conformist and close knit family sent her to Plymouth High School for Girls and then on to Newnham College to study mathematics. She then taught for a year at Wimbledon High School before returning to Devon. She moved back to London in 1893 having kept house for her brother. She had a private income and she also was now a published writer after pieces had appeared in The Yellow Book and the Westminster Gazette.

On 18 December 1897, she married the socialist Graham Wallas. The following year they had a daughter May Wallas. May had to be cared for when having diphtheria in 1910 and flu in 1917 when she too was at Newnham College. May obtained her doctorate at the London School of Economics, which her father had founded. She later went to lecture at Newnham.

In 1898, Ada contributed poems to her brother Ernest Radford's publication Songs in the Whirlwind using the name Ada Radford. Her literary work waned after marriage; her first work after marriage was a children’s book The Land of Play published in 1906. According to historian Gillian Sutherland, Her work took on somewhat less radical matters after marriage though she remained invoked in community matters through involvement in mothers’ and school organisations.

In 1929, she published Before the Bluestockings which included biographies that she had previously published. In the same year she published her early reminiscences under the title Daguerreotypes.

Wallas died in her house in Chelsea in 1934.
