= Rhymers' Club =

19th century poetry club

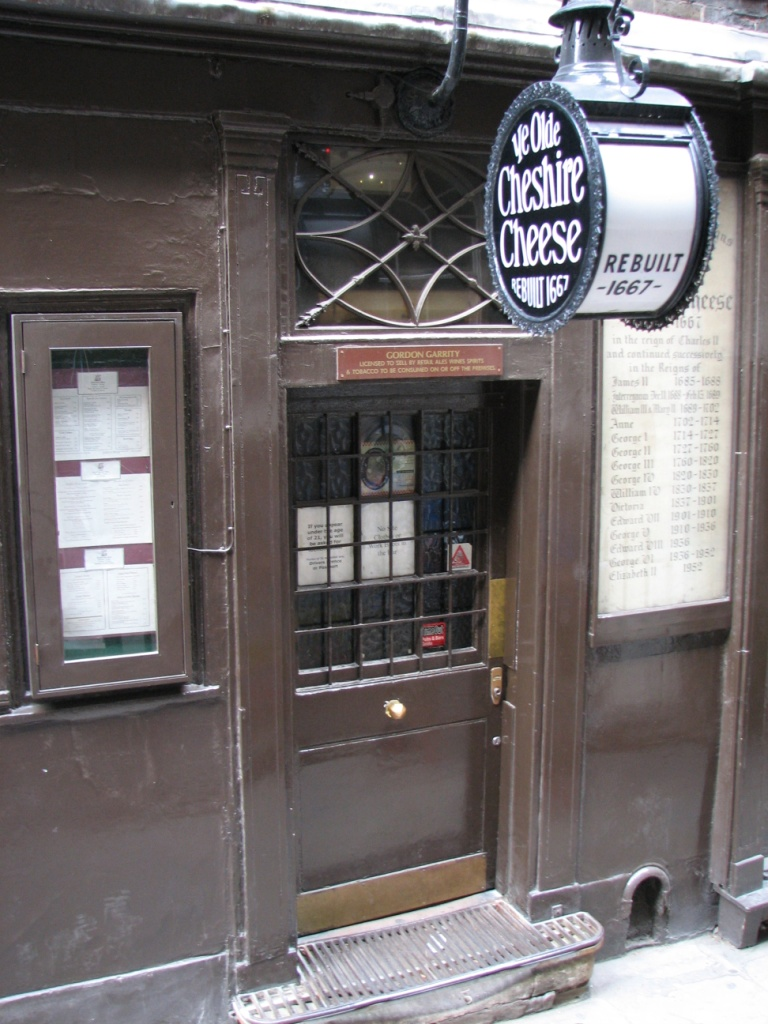
'Olde Cheshire Cheese' in Fleet street

The Rhymers' Club was a group of London-based male poets, founded in 1890 by W. B. Yeats and Ernest Rhys. Originally not much more than a dining club, it produced anthologies of poetry in 1892 and 1894. They met at the London pub ‘Ye Olde Cheshire Cheese’ just off Fleet Street and in the 'Domino Room' of the Café Royal.

Those who took part also included Ernest Dowson, Lionel Johnson, Francis Thompson, Richard Le Gallienne, John Gray, John Davidson, Edwin J. Ellis, Victor Plarr, Selwyn Image, Lord Alfred Douglas, Arthur Cecil Hillier, John Todhunter, G.A. Greene, Arthur Symons, Ernest Radford, and Thomas William Rolleston. Oscar Wilde attended some meetings that were held in private homes. The group as a whole matched quite closely Yeats' retrospective idea of 'the tragic generation', destined for failure and in many cases early death.

Along with the social element of the Rhymers' Club, they published two volumes of verse. The first, entitled The Book of the Rhymers' Club was published by Elkin Mathews in 1892. The Second Book of the Rhymers' Club appeared two years later in 1894, published by the recently merged Elkin Mathews and John Lane. They had print runs of 450 and 650 respectively. Those of the group appearing in these two volumes were: T.W. Rolleston, John Todhunter, W. B. Yeats, Richard Le Gallienne, Lionel Johnson, Arthur Cecil Hillier, Ernest Dowson, Victor Plarr, Ernest Radford, Arthur Symons, G.A. Greene, Edwin J. Ellis, and Ernest Rhys.

The dualistic existence of the club (i.e. informal meetings and producing anthologies of verse) makes the membership indeterminate. There are certain poets who were known to have attended meetings but never had their verse appear in either of the books. Also, certain poets feature in one book without featuring in the other. What is certain is that all the members were male.

By the time Arthur Ransome wrote his Bohemia in London in 1907, the group had already passed into legend: "... the Rhymer's Club used to meet, to drink from tankards, smoke clay pipes, and recite their own poetry". In fact, Ransome's research was less than thorough; the group continued to meet in some form until about 1904.
