= Ernest Rhys =

Welsh-English writer

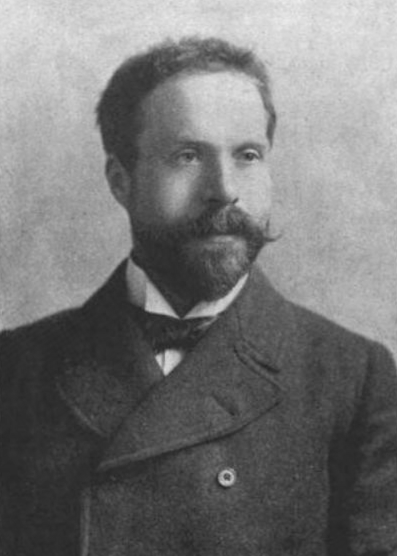
- Rhys in an 1896 publication
- Born: Ernest Percival Rhys; 17 July 1859; Islington, London, England
- Died: 25 May 1946 (aged 86); London, England
- Occupations: Writer, editor
- Spouse: Grace Little (m. 1891; died 1929)
- Children: 5

Ernest Percival Rhys (/riːs/ REESS; 17 July 1859 – 25 May 1946) was a Welsh-English writer, best known for his role as founding editor of the Everyman's Library series of affordable classics. He wrote essays, stories, poetry, novels and plays.

== Early life ==
Rhys was born in Islington in north London, the son of John Rees (his spelling) and his English wife Emma Percival of Hockerill. Shortly afterwards his father set up in the wine and spirits trade, working for Walter Gilbey in premises in Nott Square, Carmarthen, where before marriage he had been in training for the ministry. The family was in Carmarthen for a number of years, and had a Welsh-speaking maid. In 1865 John Rees was transferred to another Gilbey shop, in Newcastle upon Tyne.

After home education with a governess, Rhys spent two years at Bishop's Stortford Grammar School as a boarder, leaving in poor health. He then attended a Newcastle school run by a German master, acquiring some German and French. He then spent a desultory period working in his father's office. In 1876 he took up an apprenticeship as a mining engineer, or "coal viewer". Against the wishes of his father, Rhys did not apply to the University of Oxford.

Rhys worked through his apprenticeship in the Durham coalfield. He passed his mining engineer examination. At this period he lived in a pit village in Lower Weardale, and wrote extensively, poetry and prose, without being published. He set up a library, a book group and a programme of lectures. He described the miners' life in his story collection Black Horse Pit (1925).

On his own account, Rhys owed his first literary commission, and his interest in poetry, to Joseph Skipsey, whom he knew in Newcastle in the early 1880s. He was employed by the Walter Scott Publishing Co. of Newcastle. Initially he edited the works of George Herbert for its Canterbury Poets series. After that he was employed doing editorial work on its Camelot Series, of reprints and translations. Rhys later wrote that the approach was based on the mistaken idea that he was the academic John Rhys.

== Early associations ==
Rhys had connections to the Fabian Society, and the Socialist League led by William Morris, though he did not join the League. He was a friend of Percival Chubb (1860–1960), eventually President of the American Ethical Union. In his early life, Chubb was a disciple of Thomas Davidson, founder of the Fellowship of the New Life, and indirectly of the Fabian Society. Chubb with Rhys at the start of the 1880s mixed in these circles, and also with the Social Democratic Federation. Rhys kept up during the decade with socialists such as Edward Carpenter.

Rhys was one of a number of British socialists who visited Walt Whitman; it followed a postal introduction in 1885 by William Michael Rossetti.

== In London ==
Turning to writing in London as a profession from 1886, Rhys built up a steady reputation as a reviewer for periodicals. The American journey on which the meeting with Walt Whitman occurred is described in Everyman Remembers, Rhys's autobiography. It was also the occasion of his encounter with Edmund Clarence Stedman in New York, and dates to 1887/8. He and Stedman became correspondents. In 1890, he was sharing rooms in Hampstead with Arthur Symons.

Rhys married his wife Grace in 1891. She began to write herself after the marriage, which produced five children. Initially they lived in a cottage on Moel y Gamelin near Llangollen, but it proved impractical for the literary life, and they returned to London. Their first home there was in the Vale of Health area of Hampstead, having according to Rhys a literary association with Leigh Hunt, who moved to the unsalubrious Vale in 1816. They moved on from "Hunt Cottage", but within Hampstead so-called, to a house in Hermitage Lane, now Childs Hill, which they named "Derwen". The Rhyses there held a form of literary salon.

In 1906, Rhys persuaded J. M. Dent the publisher to start out on the ambitious Everyman's Library project. When Rhys died in London on 25 May 1946, 983 Everyman titles had been produced.

== London associations ==
In 1887 Rhys met W. B. Yeats at a Sunday political gathering called by Morris; he later introduced Yeats to the duo Michael Field. It was at a garden party held by Yeats that Rhys first met Grace Little, his future wife.

In February 1890 Rhys was a founder member of the Rhymers' Club in London. In June of that year he met the poet John Davidson at a Sunday gathering in Hampstead held by William Sharp. Davidson became a recruit to the Rhymers' Club. In its early form, the club was for "Celtic" poets. That restriction changed in January 1891, with a meeting at the base of the Century Guild of Artists in Fitzroy Street. Rhys also attended Yeats's evenings in the Woburn Buildings, St. Pancras, meeting there Maud Gonne and the young Rupert Brooke.

Chapter XIX of Everyman Remembers describes an occasion at Rhys's home attended by Yeats, Davidson, Ezra Pound, Ford Madox Hueffer and D. H. Lawrence. It has been argued that this gathering, dated to 1909, must be a conflation of events, since chronology makes it implausible that Davidson and Lawrence were both there. That year, Rhys and Ernest Radford were 1890s figures invited to the founding meeting of the poets' club set up by F. S. Flint and T. E. Hulme.

The Rhyses also knew Arthur Waugh and his family, who included the authors Alec Waugh and Evelyn Waugh; Grace became a close friend of Arthur's wife Catherine. They had settled at Hillfield Road in West Hampstead, having earlier lived off the Finchley Road. Alec Waugh was Ernest Rhys's first biographer in the Oxford Dictionary of National Biography. Evelyn Waugh, on the other hand, came to dislike the Rhys style of family and literary entertainment, by 1920.

== Works ==
- The Great Cockney Tragedy (1891)
- A London Rose: and other rhymes (1894) poems
- The Fiddler of Carne (1896) prose fable, derivative of Fiona Macleod, according to Sutherland, as was The Whistling Maid
- Welsh Ballads (1898) poems
- The Whistling Maid (1900), historical novel set in Wales
- The Man at Odds (1904), historical novel of smuggling on the Welsh coast
- Gwenevere: Lyric Play (1905)
- Lays of the Round Table (1905) poems
- The Masque of the Grail (1908)
- Enid: a lyric play written for music (1908)
- London: The Story of the City (1909)
- Lyric Poetry (1913) criticism
- English Fairy Tales (1913) with Grace Little Rhys
- The Leaf-Burners (1918) poems
- The Growth of Political Liberty (1921)
- Lost in France (1924) poems
- Black Horse Pit (1925) short story collection, worked up from pieces originally published in The Nation and the Manchester Guardian
- Everyman Remembers (1931) autobiography
- Rhymes for Everyman (1933) poems
- Letters from Limbo (1936)
- Song of the Sun (1937) poems
- Wales England Wed (1940) autobiography

== As editor ==
- with John Gwenogvryn Evans, The Text of the Bruts from the Red Book of Hergest (1890) editors
- Literary Pamphlets Chiefly Relating to Poetry from Sidney to Byron (1897) editor
- Lays of the Round Table and Other Lyric Romances (1905) editor
- Fairy Gold: A book of Old English Fairy Tales (1906) editor
- A Century of English Essays (1913) editor
- The New Golden Treasury of Songs and Lyrics (1914) editor
- Browning & His Poetry (1918) editor
- The Golden Treasury of Longer Poems (1921) editor
- The Growth of Political Liberty: A Source Book of English History (1921) editor
- The Haunters and the Haunted: Ghost Stories and Tales of the Supernatural (1921) editor
- 31 Stories by Thirty and One Authors (1923) editor
- Volume 8 of Library of World’s Best Literature Ancient and Modern, Thirty Volumes, edited by Charles Dudley Warner, R. S. Peale and J. A. Hill, publishers, 1897, contains a rather long section (47 pages, pp. 3403–3450), devoted comprehensively to Celtic literature, written by William Sharp and Rhys.
