= Charles Elkin Mathews =

British publisher and bookseller (1851–1921)

- Born: 1851; Gravesend
- Died: 1921 (aged 69–70)
- Occupation: bookseller

Charles Elkin Mathews (1851 – 10 November 1921) was a British publisher and bookseller who played an important role in the literary life of London in the late 19th and early 20th centuries.

Mathews was born in Gravesend, and learned his trade in London and Bath. In 1884 he opened his own shop in Exeter, where he published his first books in collaboration with other local booksellers.

In 1887 he returned to London, and John Lane and he went into partnership and founded The Bodley Head, which first operated as an antiquarian bookshop and later as a publisher. In 1894 they published The Yellow Book and from 1893 they published the Keynotes book series.

In 1892 he published a volume of verse from the Rhymers' Club titled The Book of the Rhymers' Club and in 1894 a follow-up volume The Second Book of the Rhymers' Club was published by him and John Lane.

In 1894 Mathews left The Bodley Head partnership. He set up on his own as Elkin Mathews Ltd. and published works by his neighbour W. B. Yeats, Lionel Johnson, John Masefield, James Joyce, Ezra Pound and Robert Bridges, among others. He also "returned to a great concentration on bookselling".

He died in 1921.

== References and sources ==
Sources

- Papers of Charles Elkin Mathews at the University of Reading Captured March 7, 2005
