= Iron horse (disambiguation) =

"Iron horse" is a literary term for a train or locomotive.

Iron horse or Ironhorse may also refer to:

== Arts and entertainment ==
=== Film and television ===
- The Iron Horse (film), a 1924 silent film directed by John Ford
- Iron Horse (TV series), a 1960s American Western series
- Irumbu Kuthirai (translation: Iron Horse), a 2014 Indian Tamil-language action film

=== Music ===
- The Iron Horse (Scottish band), 1990s
- Iron Horse (band), an American bluegrass band
- Ironhorse, a short-lived offspring of Canadian rock band Bachman-Turner Overdrive
- "Iron Horse", a 1972 song by the band Christie
- "Iron Horse / Born to Lose", a song from the 1979 album On Parole by Motörhead
- "Iron Horse", a Hank Williams Jr. song on the 1995 album Hog Wild
- Iron Horse Music Hall, a live concert venue in Northampton, Massachusetts

=== Other arts and entertainment ===
- "Iron Horse" (poem), by Allen Ginsberg, 1973
- Iron Horse (sculpture), Watkinsville, Georgia
- Iron Horse (board game), released in 1983
- Iron Horse Literary Review, a publication of Texas Tech University
- The Iron Horse, a roller coaster at Freestyle Music Park, Myrtle Beach, South Carolina
- Iron Horse Track, a type of roller coaster track developed by Rocky Mountain Construction

== Businesses (non-motorcycle) ==
- Iron Horse Bicycles, a bicycle manufacturer from 1987 to 2009
- Iron Horse Brewery, a craft brewery and brew pub operator in Ellensburg, Washington
- Iron Horse Night Club, formerly the Strathcona Canadian Pacific Railway Station, a bar in Edmonton, Alberta, Canada
- Iron Horse, an industrial park owned by the Citizen Potawatomi Nation

== Geography ==
- Iron Horse, California, a census-designated place
- Iron Horse, a neighborhood in Tucson, Arizona
  - Iron Horse Expansion Historic District, on the National Register of Historic Places in Pima County, Arizona
- Iron Horse District (disambiguation), any of several Boy Scouts of America regions
- Iron Horse Trail (disambiguation), any of several trails in the United States and Canada
  - Iron Horse State Park, a rail trail in Washington

== Motorcycle-related ==
- Iron Horse (magazine), an American motorcycling publication, 1979-2011
- Operation Iron Horse, a 1965 government investigation of the Grim Reapers Motorcycle Club in the US
- American IronHorse, 1995-2008, a defunct American custom motorcycle manufacturer

== Nicknames ==
- Lou Gehrig (1903–1941), American Hall-of-Fame baseball player
- Alan Ameche (1933–1988), American football player and entrepreneur
- Giant's Causeway (1997–2018), a Thoroughbred racehorse
- Clabber (1936–1947), a Quarter Horse stallion
- 4th Infantry Division (United States)

== Other uses ==
- Iron-horse, a rule in handicapping in xiangqi
- Iron Horse Middle School, San Ramon, California
- D-400 engine, or Iron Horse lawnmower engine, 1950s
- Iron Horse, a Cold War era surveillance network of AN/FLR-9 antenna arrays

== See also ==
- Iron Horsemen, a motorcycle club founded in 1967
- Iron Horse Park, the former repair facilities of the Boston and Maine Railroad in North Billerica, Massachusetts
- North Richland Hills/Iron Horse station, a TEXRail commuter rail station in Texas
