= The Cantos =

Poem by Ezra Pound

- Opening page of the first American edition, published 1933
- Author: Ezra Pound
- Language: English; Ancient Greek; Latin; Italian; French; Chinese
- Genre: Modernist epic
- Publisher: Faber and Faber; New Directions
- Publication place: United States
- Media type: Print
- Preceded by: Hugh Selwyn Mauberley

The Cantos is a long modernist poem by Ezra Pound, written in 109 canonical sections in addition to a number of drafts and fragments added as a supplement at the request of the poem's American publisher, James Laughlin. Most of it was written between 1915 and 1962, although much of the material in the first three cantos was abandoned or redistributed in 1923, when Pound prepared the first instalment of the poem, A Draft of XVI Cantos (Three Mountains Press, 1925). It is a book-length work, widely considered to present formidable difficulties to the reader. Strong claims have been made for it as the most significant work of modernist poetry of the twentieth century. As in Pound's prose writing, the themes of economics, governance and culture are integral to its content.

The most striking feature of the text, to a casual reader, is the inclusion of Chinese characters as well as quotations in European languages other than English. Recourse to scholarly commentaries is almost inevitable for a close reader. The range of allusion to historical events is very broad, and abrupt changes occur with little transition. There is also wide geographical reference; Pound added to his earlier interests in the classical Mediterranean culture and East Asia, selective topics from medieval and early modern Italy and Provence, the beginnings of the United States, England of the seventeenth century, and details from Africa he had obtained from Leo Frobenius.

== Structure ==
The Cantos can appear on first reading to be chaotic or structureless because the poem lacks an obvious plot. R. P. Blackmur, an early critic, wrote, "The work of Ezra Pound has been for most people almost as difficult to understand as Soviet Russia … The Cantos are not complex, they are complicated". Pound and T. S. Eliot had previously approached the subject of fragmentation of human experience: while Eliot was writing, and Pound editing, The Waste Land, Pound had said that he looked upon experience as similar to a series of iron filings on a mirror. Each filing is disconnected, but they are drawn into the shape of a rose by the presence of a magnet.

Nevertheless, there are indications in Pound's other writings that there may have been some formal plan underlying the work. In his 1918 essay A Retrospect, Pound wrote "I think there is a 'fluid' as well as a 'solid' content, that some poems may have form as a tree has form, some as water poured into a vase. That most symmetrical forms have certain uses. That a vast number of subjects cannot be precisely, and therefore not properly rendered in symmetrical forms". Critics like Hugh Kenner who take a more positive view of The Cantos have tended to follow this hint, seeing the poem as a poetic record of Pound's life and reading that sends out new branches as new needs arise with the final poem, like a tree, displaying a kind of unpredictable inevitability.

Another approach to the structure of the work is based on a letter Pound wrote to his father in the 1920s, in which he stated that his plan was:

A. A. Live man goes down into world of dead.
C. B. 'The repeat in history.'
B. C. The 'magic moment' or moment of metamorphosis, bust through from quotidian into 'divine or permanent world.' Gods, etc.

Pound writing that this sturcture was “[r]ather like, or unlike subject and response and counter subject in fugue.” Demetres P. Tryphonopoulos states that this threefold subject correlates to the stages of palingenesis, or rebirth: first is katabasis, or descent; second is dromena, wander; and third epopteia, revelation. In the light of cantos written later than this letter, it would be possible to add other recurring motifs to this list, such as: periploi ('voyages around'); vegetation rituals such as the Eleusinian Mysteries; usura, banking and credit; and the drive towards clarity in art, such as the 'clear line' of Renaissance painting and the 'clear song' of the troubadours.

The poem's symbolic structure also makes use of an opposition between darkness and light. Images of light are used variously, and may represent neoplatonic ideas of divinity, the artistic impulse, love (both sacred and physical) and good governance, among other things. The moon is frequently associated in the poem with creativity, while the sun is more often found in relation to the sphere of political and social activity, although there is frequent overlap between the two. From the Rock Drill sequence on, the poem's effort is to merge these two aspects of light into a unified whole.

The Cantos was initially published in the form of separate sections, each containing several cantos that were numbered sequentially using Roman numerals (except cantos 85–109, first published with Arabic numerals). The original publication dates for the groups of cantos are as given below. The complete collection of cantos was published together in 1987 (including a final short coda or fragment, dated 24 August 1966). In 2002 a bilingual edition of "Posthumous Cantos" (Canti postumi) appeared in Italy. This is a concise selection from the mass of drafts (circa 1915–1965) uncollected or unpublished by Pound, and contains many passages that throw light on The Cantos.

== I–XVI ==
Published in 1925 as A Draft of XVI Cantos by the Three Mountains Press in Paris.

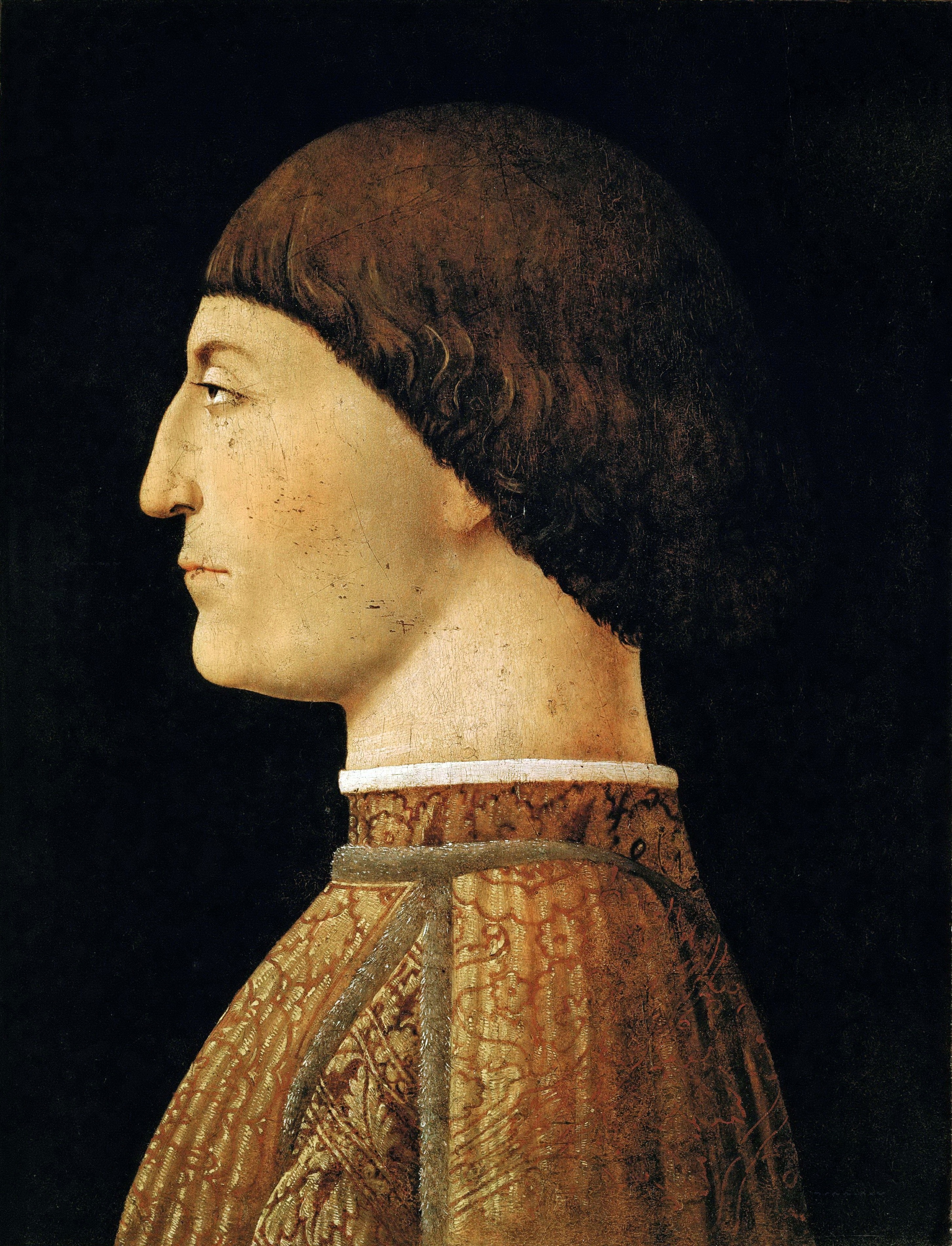
Sigismondo Pandolfo Malatesta "built a temple so full of pagan works" (Canto XI). Portrait by Piero della Francesca.

Pound was discussing the possibility of writing a long poem since around 1905, but work did not begin until sometime in 1915 The initial versions of the first three cantos of the proposed "poem of some length", in what would be later called the "Ur-Cantos", were published in the journal Poetry. In this version, the poem began very much as a direct address by the poet, not to the reader but to the ghost of Robert Browning. Pound came to realise that this need to be a controlling narrative voice was working against the revolutionary intent of his own poetic position, and these first three ur-cantos were soon abandoned and a new starting point sought. The answer was a Latin version of Homer's Odyssey by the Renaissance scholar Andreas Divus that Pound had bought in Paris sometime between 1906 and 1910. Using the metre and syntax of his 1911 version of the Anglo-Saxon poem The Seafarer, Pound made an English version of Divus' rendering of the nekuia episode in which Odysseus and his companions sail to Hades to find out what their future holds. Through this opening passage, Pound introduces a major theme; the excavating of the "dead" past to illuminate both present and future. He also echoes Dante's opening to The Divine Comedy in which the poet also descends into hell to interrogate the dead. The canto concludes with some fragments from the Second Homeric Hymn to Aphrodite, in a Latin version by Georgius Dartona which Pound found in the Divus volume, followed by "So that:"—an invitation to read on.

Canto II opens with some lines rescued from the ur-cantos in which Pound reflects on the indeterminacy of identity by setting side by side four different versions of the troubadour poet Sordello: Browning's poem of that name, the actual Sordello of flesh and blood, Pound's own version of the poet and the Sordello of the brief life appended to manuscripts of his poems. These lines are followed by a sequence of identity shifts involving a seal, the daughter of Lir and other figures associated with the sea: Eleanor of Aquitaine who, through a pair of Homeric epithets that echo her name, shifts into Helen of Troy, Homer with his ear for the "sea surge", the old men of Troy who want to send Helen back over the sea, and an extended, imagistic retelling of the story of the abduction of Dionysus by sailors and his transformation of his abductors into dolphins. Although this last story is found in the Homeric Hymn to Dionysus, also contained in the Divus volume, Pound draws on the version in Ovid's poem Metamorphoses, thus introducing the world of ancient Rome into the poem.

The next five cantos (III–VII), again drawing heavily on Pound's Imagist past for their technique, are essentially based in the Mediterranean, drawing on classical mythology, Renaissance history, the world of the troubadours, Sappho's poetry, a scene from the legend of El Cid that introduces the theme of banking and credit, and Pound's own visits to Venice to create a textual collage saturated with neoplatonist images of clarity and light.

Cantos VIII–XI draw on the story of the 15th-century Sigismondo Malatesta's battle, and ultimate defeat, with modernity. Quoting extensively from primary sources, including Malatesta's letters, Pound especially focuses on the building of the church of San Francesco, also known as the Tempio Malatestiano. Designed by Leon Battista Alberti and decorated by artists including Piero della Francesca and Agostino di Duccio, this was a landmark Renaissance building, being the first church to use the Roman triumphal arch as part of its structure. For Pound, who spent a good deal of time seeking patrons for himself, James Joyce, Eliot and a string of little magazines and small presses, the role of the patron was a crucial cultural question, and Malatesta is the first in a line of ruler-patrons to appear in The Cantos.

Canto XII consists of three moral tales on the subject of profit. The first and third of these treat of the creation of profit ex nihilo by exploiting the money supply, comparing this activity with "unnatural" fertility. The central parable contrasts this with wealth-creation based on the creation of useful goods. Canto XIII then introduces Confucius, or Kung, who is presented as the embodiment of the ideal of social order based on ethics.

This section of The Cantos concludes with a vision of hell. Cantos XIV and XV use the convention of the Divine Comedy to present Pound/Dante moving through a hell populated by bankers, newspaper editors, hack writers and other 'perverters of language' and the social order. In Canto XV, Plotinus takes the role of guide played by Virgil in Dante's poem. In Canto XVI, Pound emerges from Hell and into an earthly paradise where he sees some of the personages encountered in earlier cantos. The poem then moves to recollections of World War I, and of Pound's writer and artist friends who fought in it. These include Richard Aldington, Henri Gaudier-Brzeska, Wyndham Lewis, Ernest Hemingway and Fernand Léger, whose war memories the poem includes a passage from (in French). Finally, there is a transcript of Lincoln Steffens' account of the Russian Revolution. These two events, the war and revolution, mark a decisive break with the historic past, including the early modernist period when these writers and artists formed a more-or-less coherent movement.

== XVII–XXX ==
XVII–XXVII was published by John Rodker in London in 1928 in a luxury edition called A Draft of the Cantos 17–27 of Ezra Pound: With Initials by Gladys Hynes. Pound then wrote three more cantos for Cantos I–XXX published in 1930 in A Draft of XXX Cantos by Nancy Cunard's Hours Press.

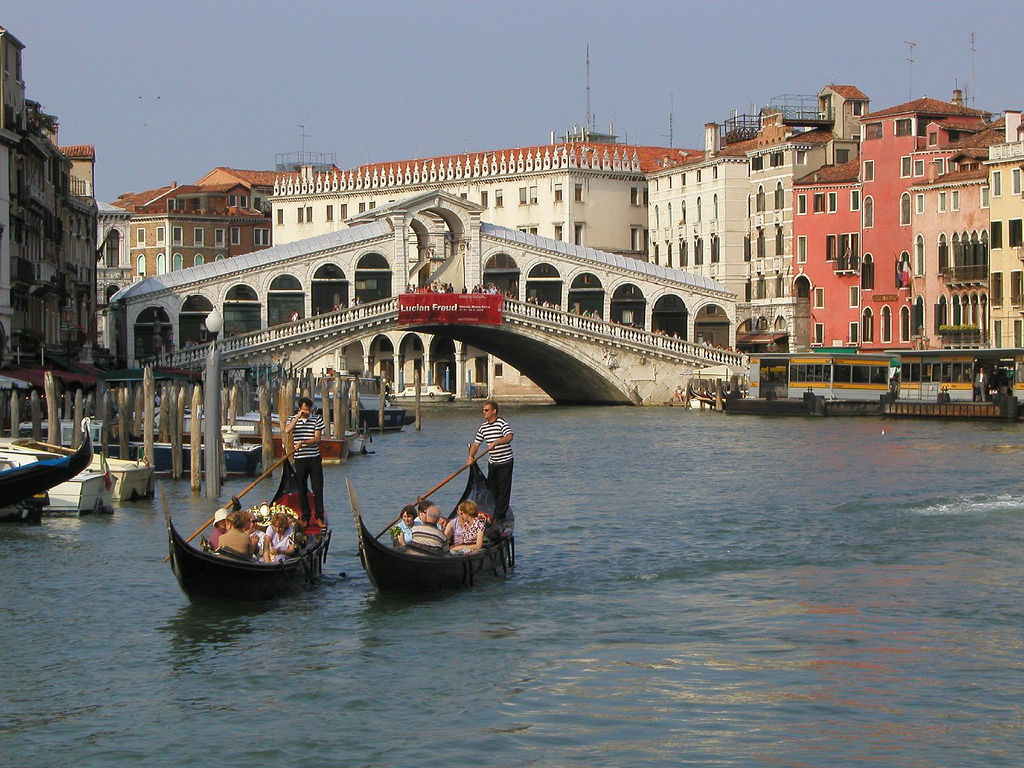
Venice: "Flat water before me, / and the trees growing in water, / Marble trunks out of stillness, / On past the palazzi, / in the stillness, The light now, not of the sun" (Canto XVII)

Originally, Pound conceived of Cantos XVII–XXVII as a group that would follow the first volume by starting with the Renaissance and ending with the Russian Revolution. The major locus of these cantos is the city of Venice.

Canto XVII opens with the words "So that", echoing the end of Canto I, and then moves on to another Dionysus-related metamorphosis story. The rest of the canto is concerned with Venice, which is portrayed as a stone forest growing out of the water. Cantos XVIII and XIX return to the theme of financial exploitation, beginning with the Venetian explorer Marco Polo's account of Kublai Khan's paper money. Canto XIX deals mainly with those who profit from war, returning briefly to the Russian Revolution, and ends on the evil of wars and those who promote them.

Canto XX opens with a grouping of phrases, words and images from Mediterranean poetry, ranging from Homer through Ovid, Propertius and Catullus to the Song of Roland and Arnaut Daniel. These fragments constellate to form an exemplum of what Pound calls "clear song". There follows another exemplum, this time of the linguistic scholarship that enables us to read these old poetries and the specific attention to words this study requires. Finally, this "clear song" and intellectual activity is implicitly contrasted with the inertia and indolence of the lotus eaters. There are references to the Malatesta family and to Borso d'Este, who tried to keep the peace between the warring Italian city states.

Canto XXI deals with the difference of patronage between the Medici family, especially Lorenzo the Magnificent and Thomas Jefferson. A phrase from one of Sigismundo Malatesta's letters inserted into the Jefferson passage ("affatigandose per suo piacere o no") draws an explicit parallel between the two men – neither had the financial power of the Medici, yet assisted in the production of art even though they were of relatively modest means and far from the centres of culture. The next canto continues the focus on finance by introducing the Social Credit theories of C.H. Douglas for the first time.

Canto XXIII returns to the world of the troubadours via Homer and Renaissance neo-platonism. Pound saw Provençal culture as a nexus of survival of the old pagan beliefs, and the destruction of the Cathar stronghold at Montsegur at the end of the Albigensian Crusade is held up as an example of the tendency of authority to crush all such alternative cultures. The destruction of Mont Segur is implicitly compared with the destruction of Troy in the closing lines of the canto.

Canto XXIV then returns to 15th-century Italy and the d'Este family, again focusing on their Venetian activities and Niccolo d'Este's voyage to the Holy Land.

Cantos XXV draws on the Book of the Council Major in Venice and Pound's personal memories of the city. Anecdotes on Titian and Mozart deal with the relationship between artist and patron. Cantos XXVI is a history of Venice. Canto XXVII outlines the Russian Revolution, which is seen as being destructive, not constructive, and echoes the ruin of Eblis from Canto VI.

XXVIII returns to the contemporary scene, with a passage on transatlantic flight. The last two cantos in the series return to the world of "clear song". In Canto XXIX, a story from their visit to the Provençal site at Excideuil contrasts Pound and Eliot on the subject of Christianity, with Pound implicitly rejecting that religion. Finally, the series closes with a glimpse of the printer Hieronymus Soncinus of Fano preparing to print the works of Petrarch.

== XXXI–XLI (Eleven New Cantos) ==
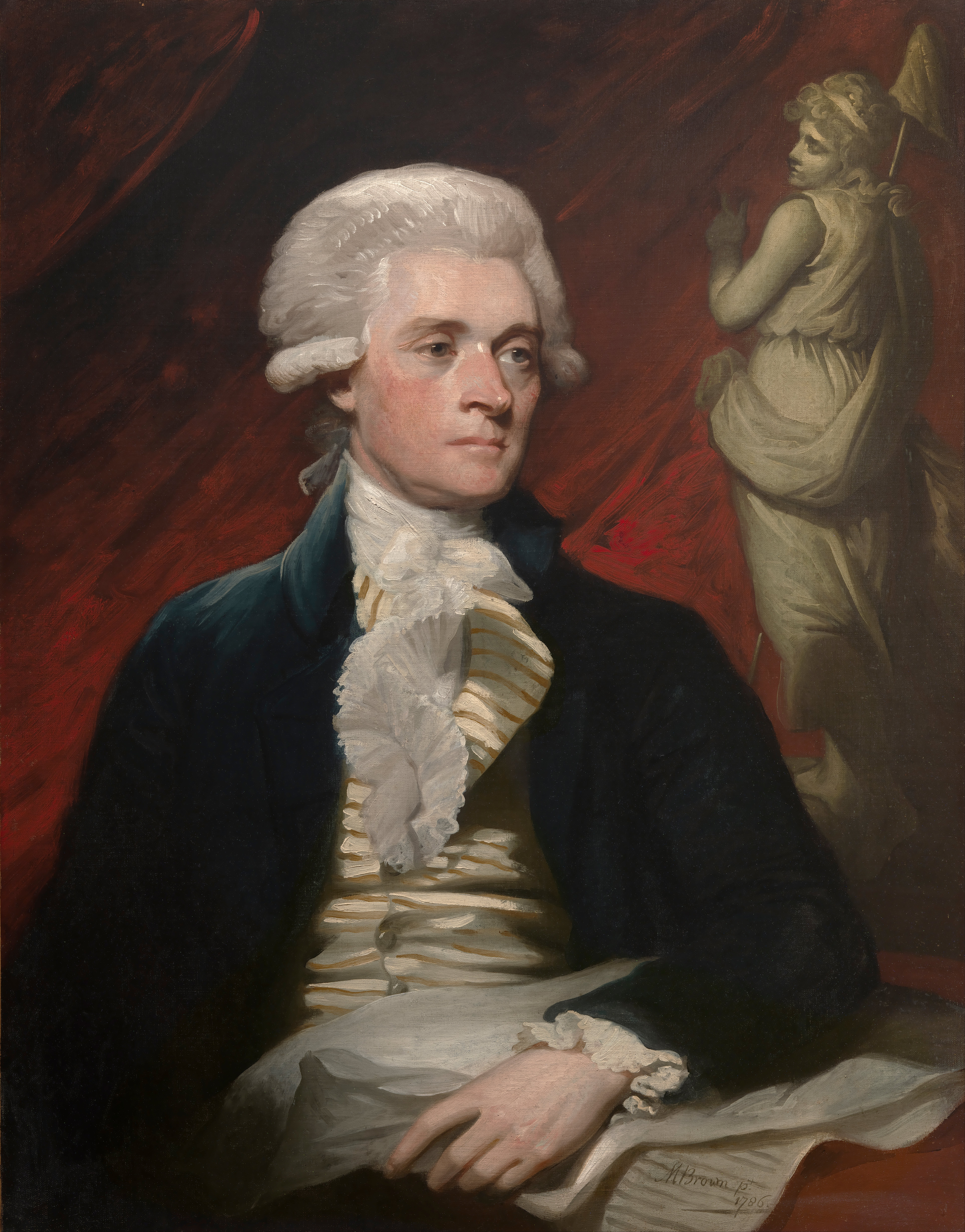
Thomas Jefferson, who was, in Pound's view, a new Sigismondo Pandolfo Malatesta.

Published as Eleven New Cantos XXXI–XLI. New York: Farrar & Rinehart Inc., 1934.

=== History ===
The Eleven New Cantos marks a turn in Pound's career in where his writings starts to incorporate his political engagement with both Italian fascism and the American Revolution. The background of this engagement was the onset of the Great Depression, where Pound looked towards the Social Credit and Gesellism movements as solutions to, as he say "evils of the Depression".

=== Content ===
The first four cantos of this volume (Cantos XXXI–XXXIV) quote extensively from the letters of Thomas Jefferson, John Adams, and the diary of John Quincy Adams, to deal with the emergence of the fledgling United States. Canto XXXI opens with the Malatesta family motto Tempus loquendi, tempus tacendi ("a time to speak, a time to be silent") to link again Jefferson and Sigismundo as individuals and the Italian and American "rebirths" as historical movements.

Canto XXXV contrasts the dynamism of Revolutionary America with the "general indefinite wobble" of the decaying aristocratic society of Mitteleuropa, the Austro-Hungarian empire. This canto contains some distinctly unpleasant expressions of antisemitic opinions. Canto XXXVI opens with a translation of Cavalcanti's canzone Donna mi pregha ("A lady asks me"). This poem, a lyric meditation on the nature and philosophy of love, was a touchstone text for Pound. He saw it as an example of the post-Montsegur survival of the Provençal tradition of "clear song", precision of thought and language, and nonconformity of belief. The canto then continues with the figure of the 9th-century Irish philosopher and poet John Scotus Eriugena, who was an influence on the Cathars and whose writings were condemned as heretical in both the 11th and 13th centuries, and closes with the Italian poet Sordello. Canto XXXVII then returns to the period before the civil war in the United States with a portrait of the American President Martin Van Buren, focusing on the period he was vice-president to Andrew Jackson, who, following his repayment of the debt of the revolutionary war of independence, also ended the Second Bank of the United States in the so-called "Bank War" of 1829–1836.

Canto XXXVIII opens with a quotation from Dante in which he rightly accuses the king of France Philip the Fair, of falsifying the coinage. The canto then turns to modern commerce and the arms trade. The canto has acquired a certain notoriety among scholars for its succinct account of C.H. Douglas's A+B Theorem, which spells out the basis of the Social Credit theory. Canto XXXIX returns to the island of Circe and the events before the voyage undertaken in the first canto and unfolds as a hymn to natural fertility and ritual sex. Canto XL is a diptych: the first section is dedicated to a summary of J. P. Morgan's fraudulent financial career; this is followed by another periplus, a condensed version of Hanno the Navigator's account of his voyage along the West coast of Africa. The collection ends with canto XLI balancing an account of Benito Mussolini during WWI and Thomas Jefferson in Paris, just before the French Revolution.

== XLII–LI (The Fifth Decad) ==
Published as The Fifth Decad of the Cantos XLII–LI. London: Faber & Faber, 1937.

Cantos XLII, XLIII and XLIV move to the Sienese bank, the Banca Monte dei Paschi di Siena and to the 18th-century reforms of Pietro Leopoldo, Habsburg Arch Duke of Tuscany. Founded in 1624, the Monte dei Paschi was a low-interest, credit institution whose funds were guaranteed by taxing the grazing of sheep on community land (the "BANK of the grassland" of Canto XLIII).

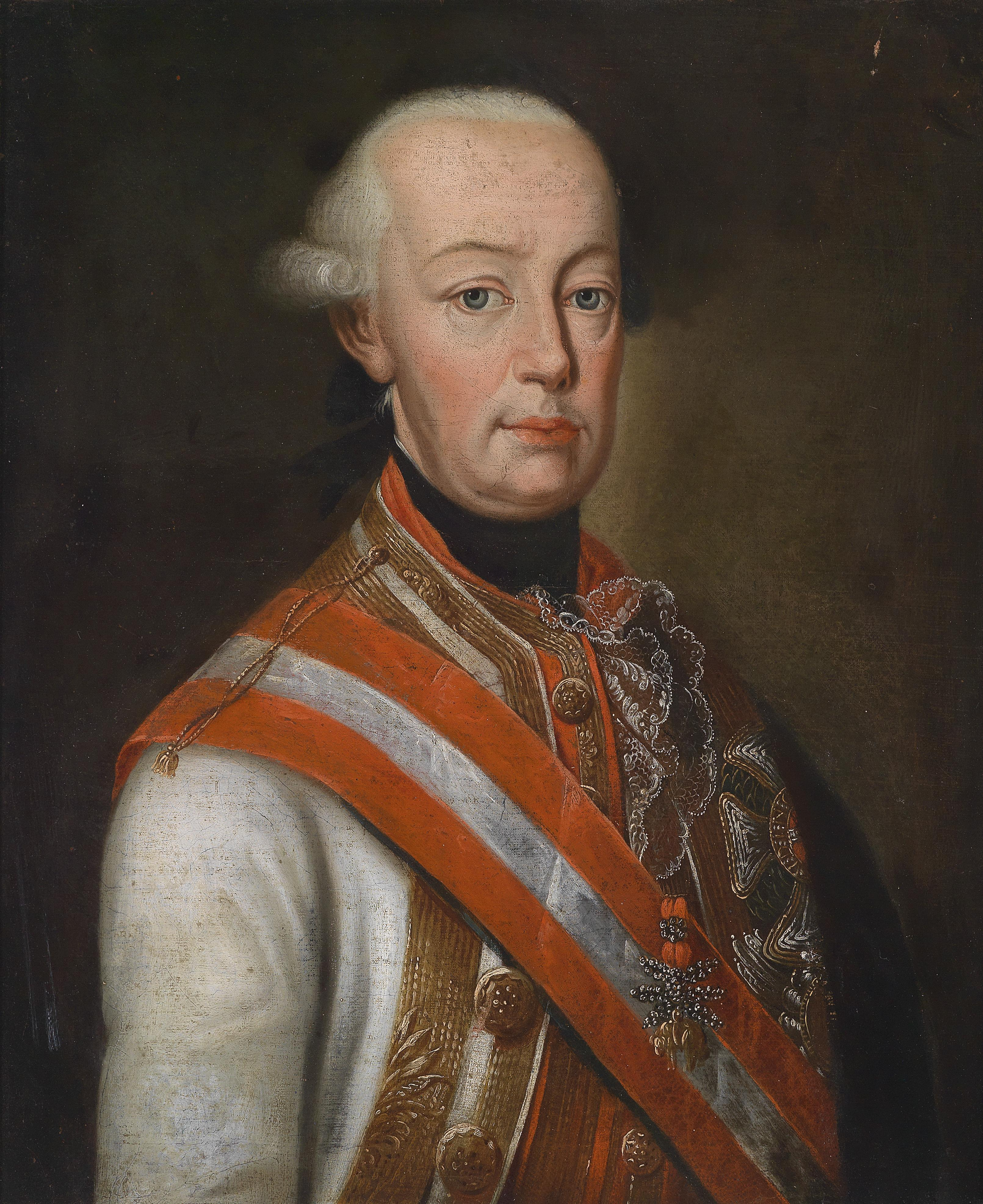
Grand Duke Pietro Leopoldo, who sought to end state debt and protected agricultural implements from sequestration for personal debt. (Portrait by Stefano Gaetano Neri.)

Canto XLV is a litany against Usura or usury, which Pound later defined as a charge on credit regardless of actual production focusing on examples from the arts in which cultural creation is independent of the market. The canto declares usury is both contrary to the laws of nature and inimical to the production of good art and culture. Pound later came to see this canto as a key central point in the poem. Canto XLVI presents the dark heart of usury, i.e. the procedures whereby money is created in liberal institutions such as the Bank of England. In Pound's view, issuing money as a form of state debt was contributing to poverty, social deprivation, crime and implicitly to "bad" art made as a form of investment and profit. At the time of writing the canto (1935) The Bank of England was still a private company, whose activities were primarily subjected to shareholder interest not the British government. The Bank was nationalised in 1946.

The poem returns to the island of Circe and Odysseus about to "sail after knowledge" in Canto XLVII. There follows a long lyrical passage in which a ritual of floating votive candles on the bay at Rapallo near Pound's home every July merges with the cognate myths of Tammuz and Adonis, agricultural activity set in a calendar based on natural cycles, and fertility rituals.

Canto XLVIII presents a suite of instances of what Pound considers to be the degradation of intelligence and civilisation due to usury. At the same time he proposes remedies: travel and exploration, as well as sexual and religious freedom.

Canto XLIX is a poem of tranquil nature derived from a Chinese picture book that Pound's parents brought with them when they retired to Rapallo. Canto L is an investigation of a theory by one of the writers that Pound was in contact with, namely Robert McNair Wilson, a specialist in the life of Napoleon. Wilson's idea was that Bonaparte had been a flawed hero who had fought and been crushed by usury. The canto actively follows this idea but finds rather that Napoleon did not change the financial arrangements of his day, or had any progressive economic idea. Pound also shows how the Rothschild family actively helped the British and Austrian cause against him. The final canto in this sequence returns to the usura litany of Canto XLV, followed by detailed instructions on making flies for fishing (man in harmony with nature) and ends with a reference to the anti-Venetian League of Cambrai. They decad ends with the first Chinese written characters to appear in the poem, representing the Rectification of Names from the Analects of Confucius (the ideogram representing honesty at the end of Canto XXXIV was added when The Cantos was published as a single volume).

== LII–LXI (The Chinese History Cantos) ==
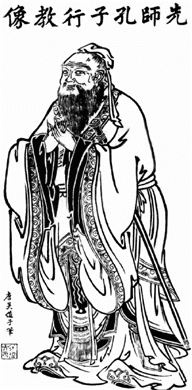
Confucius "cut 3000 odes to 300".

First published in Cantos LII–LXXI. Norfolk Conn.: New Directions, 1940.

These cantos are based on the first eleven volumes of the twelve-volume Histoire generale de la Chine by Joseph-Anna-Marie de Moyriac de Mailla. De Mailla was a French Jesuit who spent 37 years in Peking and wrote his history there. The work was completed in 1730 but not published until 1777–1783. De Mailla was very much an Enlightenment figure and his view of Chinese history reflects this; he found Confucian political philosophy, with its emphasis on rational order, much to his liking. He also disliked what he saw as the superstitious pseudo-mysticism promulgated by both Buddhists and Taoists, to the detriment of rational politics. Pound, in turn, fitted de Mailla's take on China into his own views on Christianity, the need for strong leadership to address 20th-century fiscal and cultural problems, and his support of Mussolini. In an introductory note to the section, Pound is at pains to point out that the ideograms and other fragments of foreign-language text incorporated in The Cantos should not put the reader off, as they serve to underline things that are in the English text.

Canto LII is a diptych contrasting the Western world eroded by usury with the beginnings of Chinese civilisation as evident in the Book of Rites, especially those parts that deal with agriculture and natural increase. The diction is the same as that used in earlier cantos on similar subjects.

Canto LIII covers the period from the founding of the Xia dynasty up to circa 225 BCE including the life of Confucius in the 5th century BC. Special mention is made of emperors that Confucius approved of and the sage's interest in cultural matters is stressed. For example, we are told that he edited the Book of Odes, cutting it from 3000 to 300 poems. Canto LIV moves the story on to around 805 CE. from the first emperor Qin Shi Huang to the middle of the Tang dynasty.

Canto LV is mainly concerned with the decadence of the Tang, The Five Dynasties and Ten Kingdom's period and the rise of the Song dynasty, including the rise of the Tatars and the Tartar Wars, ending about 1200. There is a lot on money policy in this canto and Pound quotes approvingly the Tartar ruler Oulo who noted that the people "cannot eat jewels". This is echoed in Canto LVI when KinKwa remarks that both gold and jade are inedible. This canto is mainly concerned with Ghengis and Kublai Khan and the rise of their Yeun dynasty. The canto closes with the overthrow of the Yuan and the establishment of the Ming dynasty, bringing us to around 1400.

Canto LVII opens with the story of the flight of the emperor Kien Ouen Ti in 1402 or 1403 and continues with the history of the Ming up to the middle of the 16th century. Canto LVIII opens with a condensed history of Japan from the legendary first emperor, Emperor Jimmu, who supposedly ruled in the 7th century BCE, to the late 16th-century Toyotomi Hideyoshi (anglicised by Pound as Messier Undertree), who issued edicts against Christianity and raided Korea, thus putting pressure on China's eastern borders. The canto then goes on to outline the concurrent pressure placed on the western borders by activities associated with the great Tartar horse fairs, leading to the rise of the Manchu dynasty.

The translation of the Confucian classics into Manchu opens the following canto, Canto LIX. The canto is then concerned with the increasing European interest in China during the reign of Emperor Kang Xi, as evidenced by the Sino-Russian border treaty in 1684 and the founding of the Jesuit mission in 1685 under Jean-François Gerbillon. Canto LX deals with the activities of the Jesuits, who, we are told, introduced astronomy, western music, physics and the use of quinine. The canto ends with limitations being placed on Christians, who had come to be seen as enemies of the state.

The final canto in the sequence, Canto LXI, covers the reigns of Yong Tching and Kien Long, bringing the story up to 1790. Yong Tching is shown banning Christianity as "immoral" and "seeking to uproot Kung's laws". He also established just prices for foodstuffs, bringing us back to the ideas of Social Credit. There are also references to the Italian Risorgimento, John Adams, and Dom Metello de Souza, who gained some measure of relief for the Jesuit mission.

== LXII–LXXI (The Adams Cantos) ==
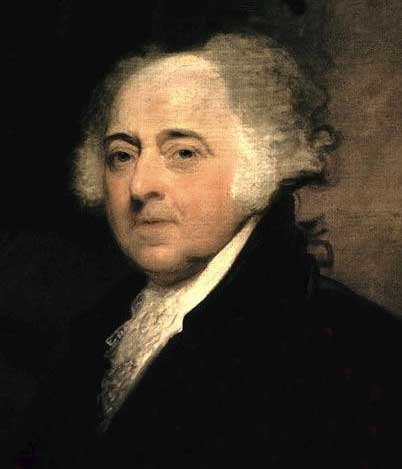
John Adams: "the man who at certain points /made us / at certain points / saved us" (Canto LXII).

First published in Cantos LII–LXXI. Norfolk Conn.: New Directions, 1940.

This section of the cantos is, for the most part, made up of fragmentary citations from the writings of John Adams. Pound's intentions appear to be to show Adams as an example of the rational Enlightenment leader, thereby continuing the primary theme of the preceding China Cantos sequence, which these cantos also follow from chronologically. Adams is depicted as a rounded figure; he is a strong leader with interests in political, legal and cultural matters in much the same way that Malatesta and Mussolini are portrayed elsewhere in the poem. The English jurist Sir Edward Coke, who is an important figure in some later cantos, first appears in this section of the poem. Given the fragmentary nature of the citations used, these cantos can be quite difficult to follow for the reader with no knowledge of the history of the United States in the late 18th and early 19th centuries.

Canto LXII opens with a brief history of the Adams family in America from 1628. The rest of the canto is concerned with events leading up to the revolution, Adams' time in France, and the formation of Washington's administration. Alexander Hamilton reappears, again cast as the villain of the piece. The appearance of the single Greek word "THUMON", meaning heart, returns us to the world of Homer's Odyssey and Pound's use of Odysseus as a model for all his heroes, including Adams. The word is used of Odysseus in the fourth line of the Odyssey: "he suffered woes in his heart on the seas".

The next canto, Canto LXIII, is concerned with Adams' career as a lawyer and especially his reports of the legal arguments presented by James Otis in the Writ of assistance case and their importance in the build-up to the revolution. The Latin phrase Eripuit caelo fulmen ("He snatched the thunderbolt from heaven") is taken from an inscription on a bust of Benjamin Franklin. Cavalcanti's canzone, Pound's touchstone text of clear intellection and precision of language, reappears with the insertion of the lines "In quella parte / dove sta memoria" into the text.

Canto LXIV covers the Stamp act and other resistance to British taxation of the American colonies. It also shows Adams defending the accused in the Boston Massacre and engaging in agricultural experiments to ascertain the suitability of Old-World crops for American conditions. The phrases Cumis ego oculis meis, tu theleis, respondebat illa and apothanein are from the passage (taken from Petronius' Satyricon) that T.S. Eliot used as epigraph to The Waste Land at Pound's suggestion. The passage translates as "For with my own eyes I saw the Sibyl hanging in a jar at Cumae, and when the boys said to her, 'Sibyl, what do you want?' she replied, 'I want to die.'"

The nomination of Washington as president dominates the opening pages of Canto LXV. The canto shows Adams concerned with the practicalities of waging war, particularly of establishing a navy. Following a passage on the drafting of the Declaration of Independence, the canto returns to Adams' mission to France, focusing on his dealings with the American legation in that country, consisting of Franklin, Silas Deane and Edward Bancroft and with the French foreign minister, the Comte de Vergennes. Intertwined with this is the fight to save the rights of Americans to fish the Atlantic coastline. A passage on Adams' opposition to American involvement in European wars is highlighted, echoing Pound's position on his own times. In Canto LXVI, we see Adams in London serving as minister to the Court of St James's. The body of the canto consists of quotations from Adams' writings on the legal basis for the Revolution, including citations from Magna Carta and Coke and on the importance of trial by jury (per pares et legem terrae).

Canto LXVII opens with a passage on the limits on the powers of the British monarch drawn from Adams' writings under the pseudonym Novanglus. The rest of the canto is concerned with the study of government and with the requirements of the franchise. The following canto, LXVIII, begins with a meditation on the tripartite division of society into the one, the few and the many. A parallel is drawn between Adams and Lycurgus, king of Sparta. Then the canto returns to Adams' notes on the practicalities of funding the war and the negotiation of a loan from the Dutch.

Canto LXIX continues the subject of the Dutch loan and then turns to Adams' fear of the emergence of a native aristocracy in America, as noted in his remark that Jefferson feared rule by "the one" (monarch or dictator), while he, Adams, feared "the few". The remainder of the canto is concerned with Hamilton, James Madison and the affair of the assumption of debt certificates by Congress which resulted in a significant shift of economic power to the federal government from the individual states.

Canto LXX deals mainly with Adams' time as vice-president and president, focusing on his statement "I am for balance", highlighted in the text by the addition of the ideogram for balance. The section ends with Canto LXXI, which summarises many of the themes of the foregoing cantos and adds material on Adams' relationship with Native Americans and their treatment by the British during the Indian Wars. The canto closes with the opening lines of Epictetus' Hymn of Cleanthus, which Pound tells us formed part of Adams' paideuma. These lines invoke Zeus as one "who rules by law", a clear parallel to the Adams presented by Pound.

== LXXII–LXXIII (The Italian Cantos) ==
Written between 1944 and 1945.

These two cantos, written in Italian, were not collected until their posthumous inclusion in the 1987 revision of the complete text of the poem. Pound reverts to the model of Dante’s Divine Comedy and casts himself as conversing with ghosts from Italy's remote and recent past.

In Canto LXXII, imitative of Dante's tercets (terza rima), Pound meets the recently dead Futurist writer Filippo Tommaso Marinetti, and they discuss the current war and their excessive love of the past (Pound) and of the future (Marinetti). Then the violent ghost of Dante's Ezzelino III da Romano, brother of Cunizza of Cantos VI and XXIX, explains to Pound that he has been misrepresented as an evil tyrant only because he was against the Pope's party, and goes on to attack the present Pope Pius XII and "traitors" (like king Victor Emmanuel III) who betrayed Mussolini, and to promise that the Italian troops will eventually "return" to El Alamein.

Canto LXXIII is subtitled "Cavalcanti – Republican Correspondence" and is written in the style of Cavalcanti's "Donna mi prega" of Canto XXXVI. Guido Cavalcanti appears on horseback to tell Pound about a heroic deed of a girl from Rimini who led a troop of Canadian soldiers to a mined field and died with the "enemy". (This was a propaganda story featured in Italian newspapers in October 1944; Pound was interested in it because of the connection with Sigismondo Malatesta's Rimini.) Both cantos end on a positive and optimistic note, typical of Pound, and are unusually straightforward. Except for a scathing reference (by Cavalcanti's ghost) to "Roosevelt, Churchill and Eden / bastards and small Jews", and for a denial (by Ezzelino) that "the world was created by a Jew", they are notably free of anti-Semitic content, although it must be said that there are several positive references to Italian fascism and some racist expressions (e.g., "Son marocchini ed altra immondizia"—"They are Moroccans and other trash", Canto LXXII). Italian scholars have been intrigued by Pound's idiosyncratic recreation of the poetry of Dante and Cavalcanti.

== LXXIV–LXXXIV (The Pisan Cantos) ==
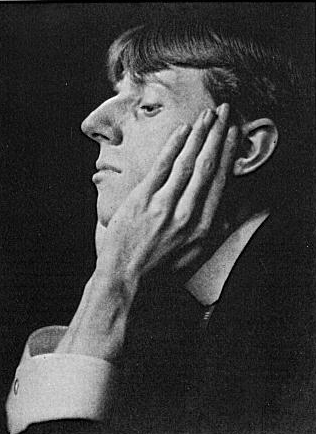
Aubrey Beardsley: "Beauty is difficult, Yeats' said Aubrey Beardsley / when Yeats asked why he drew horrors / or at least not Burne-Jones / and Beardsley knew he was dying and had to / make his hit quickly ... / So very difficult, Yeats, beauty so difficult" (Canto LXXX).

First published as The Pisan Cantos. New York: New Directions, 1948.

With the outbreak of war in 1939, Pound was in Italy, where he remained, despite a request for repatriation he made after Pearl Harbor. During this period, his main source of income was a series of radio broadcasts he made on Rome Radio. He used these broadcasts to express his full range of opinions on culture, politics and economics, including his opposition to American involvement in a European war and his anti-Semitism. In 1943, he was indicted for treason in his absence, and wrote a letter to the indicting judge in which he claimed the right to freedom of speech in his defence.

Pound was captured by Italian partisans in April 1945 and was eventually transferred to the American Disciplinary Training Center (DTC) on 22 May. Here he was held in a specially reinforced cage, initially sleeping on the ground in the open air. After three weeks, he had a breakdown that resulted in his being given a cot and pup tent in the medical compound. Here, he gained access to a typewriter. For reading matter, he had a regulation-issue Bible along with three books he was allowed to bring in as his own "religious" texts: a Chinese text of Confucius, James Legge's translation of the same, and a Chinese dictionary. He later found a copy of the Pocket Book of Verse, edited by Morris Edmund Speare, in the latrine. The only other thing he brought with him was a eucalyptus pip. Throughout the Pisan sequence, Pound repeatedly likens the camp to Francesco del Cossa's March fresco depicting men working at a grape arbour.

With his political certainties collapsing around him and his library inaccessible, Pound turned inward for his materials and much of the Pisan sequence is concerned with memory, especially of his years in London and Paris and of the writers and artists he knew in those cities. There is also a deepening of the ecological concerns of the poem. The awarding of the Bollingen Prize to the book caused considerable controversy, with many people objecting to the honouring of someone they saw as a madman and/or traitor. However, The Pisan Cantos is generally the most admired and read section of the work. It is also among the most influential, having affected poets as different as H.D. and Gary Snyder.

Canto LXXIV immediately introduces the reader to the method used in the Pisan Cantos, which is one of interweaving themes somewhat in the manner of a fugue. These themes pick up on many of the concerns of the earlier cantos and frequently run across sections of the Pisan sequence. This canto begins with Pound looking out of the DTC at peasants working in the fields nearby and reflecting on the news of the death of Mussolini, "hung by the heels".

In the first thread, the figure of Pound/Odysseus reappears in the guise of "OY TIS", or no man, the name the hero uses in the Cyclops episode of the Odyssey. This figure blends into the Australia rain god Wanjina, who had his mouth closed up by his father (was deprived of freedom of speech) because he "created too many things". He, in turn, becomes the Chinese Ouan Jin, or man with an education. This theme recurs in the line "a man on whom the sun has gone down", a reference to the nekuia from Canto I, which is then explicitly referred to. This recalls The Seafarer, and Pound quotes a line from his translation, "Lordly men are to earth o'ergiven", lamenting the loss of the exiled poet's companions. This is then applied to a number of Pound's dead friends from the London/Paris years, including W. B. Yeats, Joyce, Ford Madox Ford, Victor Plarr and Henry James. Finally, Pound/Odysseus is seen "on a raft blown by the wind".

Another major theme running through this canto is that of the vision of a goddess in the poet's tent. This starts from the identification of a nearby mountain with the Chinese holy mountain Taishan and the naming of the moon as sorella la luna (sister moon). This thread then runs through the appearance of Kuanon, the Buddhist goddess of mercy, the moon spirit from Hagaromo (a Noh play translated by Pound some 40 years earlier), Sigismondo's lover Ixotta (linked in the text with Aphrodite via a reference to the goddess' birthplace Cythera), a girl painted by Édouard Manet and finally Aphrodite herself, rising from the sea on her shell and rescuing Pound/Odysseus from his raft. The two threads are further linked by the placement of the Greek word brododactylos ("rosy-fingered") applied by Homer to the dawn but given here in the dialect of Sappho and used by her in a poem of unrequited love. These images are often intimately associated with the poet's close observation of the natural world as it imposes itself on the camp; birds, a lizard, clouds, the weather and other images of nature run through the canto.

Images of light and brightness associated with these goddesses come to focus in the phrase "all things that are, are lights" quoted from John Scotus Eriugena. He, in turn, brings us back to the Albigensian Crusade and the troubadour world of Bernard de Ventadorn. Another theme sees Ecbatana, the seven-walled "city of Dioce", blend with the city of Wagadu, from the tale of Gassire's Lute that Pound learned from Frobenius. This city, four times rebuilt, with its four walls, four gates and four towers at the corners is a symbol for spiritual endurance. It, in turn, blends with the DTC in which the poet is imprisoned.

The question of banking and money also recurs, with an anti-Semitic passage aimed at the banker Meyer Anselm (probably Meyer Rothschild). Pound brings in biblical injunctions on usury and a reference to the issuing of a stamp scrip currency in the Austrian town of Wörgl. The canto then moves on to a longish passage of memories of the moribund literary scene Pound encountered in London when he first arrived, with the phrase "beauty is difficult", quoted from Aubrey Beardsley, acting as a refrain. After more memories of America and Venice, the canto ends in a passage that brings together Dante's celestial rose, the rose formed by the effect of a magnet on iron filings, an image from Paul Verlaine of the human soul as a fountain and a reference to a poem by Ben Jonson in a composite image of hope for "those who have passed over Lethe".

Canto LXXV is mainly a facsimile of the German pianist Gerhart Münch's violin setting of the 16th-century Italian Francesco Da Milano's transcription for lute of French composer Clément Janequin's choral work Le Chant des oiseaux, an ancient song recalled to Pound's mind by the singing of birds on the fence of the DTC, and a symbol for him of an indestructible form preserved and transmitted through many versions, times, nations and artists. (Compare the nekuia of canto I.) Münch was a friend and collaborator of Pound in Rapallo, and the short prose section at the beginning of the canto celebrates his work on other early music figures.

Canto LXXVI opens with a vision of a group of goddesses in Pound's room on the Rapallo hillside and then moves, via Mont Segur, to memories of Paris and Jean Cocteau. There follows a passage in which the poet recognises the Jewish authorship of the prohibition on usury found in Leviticus. Conversations in the camp are then cross-cut into memories of Provence and Venice, details of the American Revolution and further visions. These memories lead to a consideration of what has or may have been destroyed in the war. Pound remembers the moment in Venice when he decided not to destroy his first book of verse, A Lume Spento, an affirmation of his decision to become a poet and a decision that ultimately led to his incarceration in the DTC. The canto ends with the goddess, in the form of a butterfly, leaving the poet's tent amid further references to Sappho and Homer.

The main focus of Canto LXXVII is accurate use of language, and at its centre is the moment when Pound hears that the war is over. Pound draws on examples of language use from Confucius, the Japanese dancer Michio Itô, who worked with Pound and Yeats in London, a Dublin cab driver, Aristotle, Basil Bunting, Yeats, Joyce and the vocabulary of the U.S. Army. The goddess in her various guises appears again, as does Awoi's hennia, the spirit of jealousy from "AOI NO UE", a Noh play translated by Pound. The canto closes with an invocation of Dionysus (Zagreus).

After opening with a glimpse of Mount Ida, an important locus for the history of the Trojan War, Canto LXXVIII moves through much that is familiar from the earlier cantos in the sequence: del Cossa, the economic basis of war, Pound's writer and artist friends in London, "virtuous" rulers (Lorenzo de' Medici, the emperors Justinian, Titus and Antoninus, Mussolini), usury and stamp scripts culminating in the Nausicaa episode from the Odyssey and a reference to the Confucian classic Annals of Spring and Autumn in which "there are no righteous wars".

The moon and clouds appear at the opening of Canto LXXIX, which then moves on through a passage in which birds on the wire fence recall musical notation and the sounds of the camp and thoughts of Mozart, del Cossa and Marshal Pétain meld to form musical counterpoint. After references to politics, economics, and the nobility of the world of the Noh and the ritual dance of the moon-nymph in Hagaromo that dispels mortal doubt, the canto closes with an extended fertility hymn to Dionysus in the guise of his sacred lynx.

Canto LXXX opens in the camp in the shadow of death and soon turns to memories of London, Paris and Spain, including a recollection of Walter Rummel, who worked with Pound on troubadour music before World War I and of Eliot, Lewis, Laurence Binyon and others. The canto is concerned with the aftermath of war, drawing on Yeats' experiences after the Irish Civil War as well as the contemporary situation. Hagoromo appears again before the poem returns to Beardsley, also in the shadow of death, declaring the difficulty of beauty with a phrase from Symons and Sappho/Homer's rosy-fingered dawn woven through the passage.

Pound writes of the decline of the sense of the spirit in painting from a high-point in Sandro Botticelli to the fleshiness of Rubens and its recovery in the 20th century as evidenced in the works of Marie Laurencin and others. This is set between two further references to Mont Segur. Pound/Odysseus is then saved from his sinking raft by Walt Whitman and Richard Lovelace as discovered in the anthology of poetry found in the camp toilet and the other prisoners are compared with Odysseus' crew, "men of no fortune". The canto then closes with two passages, one a pastiche of Browning, the other of Edward Fitzgerald's Rubaiyat of Omar Khayyam, lamenting the lost London of Pound's youth and an image of nature as designer.

Canto LXXXI opens with a complex image that illustrates Pound's technical approach well. The opening line, "Zeus lies in Ceres bosom", merges the conception of Demeter, passages in previous cantos on ritual copulation as a means of ensuring fertility, and the direct experience of the sun (Zeus) still hidden at dawn by two hills resembling breasts in the Pisan landscape. This is followed by an image of the other mountain that reminded the poet of Taishan surrounded by vapors and surmounted by the planet Venus ("Taishan is attended of loves / under Cythera, before sunrise").

The canto then moves through memories of Spain, a story told by Basil Bunting, and anecdotes of a number of familiar personages and of George Santayana. At the core of this passage is the line "(to break the pentameter, that was the first heave)", Pound's comment on the "revolution of the word" that led to the emergence of Modernist poetry in the early years of the century.

The goddess of love then returns after a lyric passage situating Pound's work in the great tradition of English lyric, in the sense of words intended to be sung. This heralds perhaps the most widely quoted passages in The Cantos, in which Pound expresses his realisation that "What thou lovest well remains, / the rest is dross" and an acceptance of the need for human humility in the face of the natural world that prefigures some of the ideas associated with the deep ecology movement.

The opening of Canto LXXXII marks a return to the camp and its inmates. This is followed by a passage that draws on Pound's London memories and his reading of the Pocket Book of Verse. Pound laments his failure to recognise the Greek qualities of Swinburne's work and celebrates Wilfrid Scawen Blunt, Rudyard Kipling, Ford, Whitman, Yeats and others. After an expanded clarification of the Annals of Spring and Autumn / "there are no righteous wars" passage from Canto LXXVIII, this canto culminates in images of the poet drowning in earth and a recurrence of the Greek word for weeping, ending with more bird-notes seen as a periplum.

After a number of cantos in which the elements of earth and air feature so strongly, Canto LXXXIII opens with images of water and light, drawn from Pindar, George Gemistos Plethon, John Scotus Eriugena, the mermaid carvings of Pietro Lombardo and Heraclitus' phrase panta rei ("everything flows"). A passage addressed to a Dryad speaks out against the death sentence and cages for wild animals and is followed by lines on equity in government and natural processes based on the writings of Mencius. The tone of placid acceptance is underscored by three Chinese characters that translate as "don't help to grow that which will grow of itself" followed by another appearance of the Greek word for weeping in the context of remembered places.

Close observation of a wasp building a mud nest returns the canto to earth and to the figure of Tiresias, last encountered in Cantos I and XLVII. The canto moves on through a long passage remembering Pound's time as Yeats' secretary in 1914 and a shorter meditation on the decline in standards in public life deriving from a remembered visit to the senate in the company of Pound's mother while that house was in session. The closing lines, "Down derry-down / Oh let an old man rest", return the poem from the world of memory to the poet's present plight.

Canto LXXXIV opens with the delivery of Dorothy Pound's first letter to the DTC on 8 October. This letter contained news of the death in the war of J.P. Angold, a young English poet whom Pound admired. This news is woven through phrases from a lament by the troubadour Bertran de Born (which Pound had once translated as "Planh for the Young English King") and a double occurrence of the Greek word tethneke ("is dead") remembered from the story of the death of Pan in Canto XXIII.

This death, reviving memories of the poet's dead friends from World War I, is followed by a passage on Pound's 1939 visit to Washington, D.C. to try to avert American involvement in the forthcoming European war. Much of the rest of the canto is concerned with the economic basis of war and the general lack of interest in this subject on the part of historians and politicians; John Adams is again held up as an ideal. The canto also contains a reproduction, in Italian, of a conversation between the poet and a "swineherd's sister" through the DTC fence. He asks her if the American troops behave well and she replies OK. He then asks how they compare to the Germans and she replies that they are the same.

The moon/goddess reappears at the core of the canto as "pin-up" and "chronometer" close to the line "out of all this beauty something must come". The closing lines of the canto, and of the sequence, "If the hoar frost grip thy tent / Thou wilt give thanks when night is spent", sound a final note of acceptance and resignation, despite the return to the sphere of action, prompted by the death of Angold, that marks most of the canto.

== LXXXV–XCV (Section: Rock-Drill) ==
Published in 1956 as Section: Rock-Drill, 85–95 de los cantares by New Directions, New York.

Pound was flown from Pisa to Washington to face trial on a charge of treason in 1946. Found unfit to stand trial because of the state of his mental health, he was incarcerated in St. Elizabeths Hospital, where he was to remain until 1958. Here he began to entertain writers and academics with an interest in his work and to write, working on translations of the Confucian Book of Odes and of Sophocles' play Women of Trachis and two new sections of the cantos; the first of these was Rock Drill.

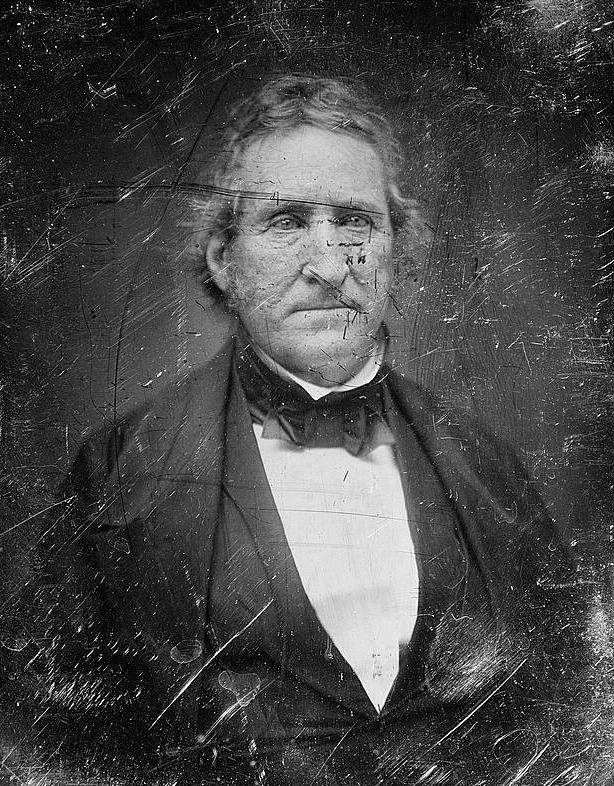
Senator Thomas Hart Benton, who opposed the establishment of the Bank of the United States. His Thirty Years View is a key source for this section of The Cantos.

The two main written sources for the Rock Drill cantos are the Confucian Book of Documents, in an edition by the French Jesuit Séraphin Couvreur, which contained the Chinese text and translations into Latin and French under the title Chou King (which Pound uses in the poem), and Senator Thomas Hart Benton's Thirty Years View: Or A History of the American Government for Thirty Years From 1820–1850, which covers the period of the bank wars. In an interview given in 1962, and reprinted by J. P. Sullivan, Pound said that the title Rock Drill "was intended to imply the necessary resistance in getting a main thesis across — hammering."

The first canto in the sequence, Canto LXXXV, contains 104 Chinese characters from the Chou King, in addition to a number of Latin phrases, mostly taken from Couvreur's translation. There are also a small number of Greek words. The overall effect for the English-speaking reader is one of unreadability, and the canto is hard to elucidate unless read alongside a copy of Couvreur's text.

The core meaning is summed up in Pound's footnote to the effect that the History Classic contains the essentials of the Confucian view of good government. In the canto, these are summed up in the line "Our dynasty came in because of a great sensibility", where sensibility translates the key character Ling, and in the reference to the four Tuan, or foundations, benevolence, rectitude, manners and knowledge. Rulers who Pound viewed as embodying some or all of these characteristics are adduced: Queen Elizabeth I, Cleopatra, Alexander the Great, as are Napoleon III, Franklin D. Roosevelt and Harry Dexter White, who stand for everything Pound opposes in government and finance.

The world of nature, Pound's source of wealth and spiritual nourishment, also features strongly; images of roots, grass and surviving traces of fertility rites in Catholic Italy cluster around the sacred tree Yggdrasil. The natural world and the world of government are related to tekhne or art. Richard of Saint Victor, with his emphasis on modes of thinking, makes an appearance, in close company with Eriugena, the philosopher of light.

Canto LXXXVI opens with a passage on the Congress of Vienna and continues to hold up examples of good and bad rulers as defined by the poet with Latin and Chinese phrases from Couvreur woven through them. The word Sagetrieb, meaning something like the transmission of tradition, apparently coined by Pound, is repeated after its first use in the previous canto, underlining Pound's belief that he is transmitting a tradition of political ethics that unites China, Revolutionary America and his own beliefs.

Canto LXXXVII opens on usury and moves through a number of references to "good" and "bad" leaders and lawgivers interwoven with neo-platonist philosophers and images of the power of natural process. This culminates in a passage bringing together Binyon's dictum slowness is beauty|golden ratio, a room in the church of St. Hilaire, Poitiers built to that rule where one can stand without throwing a shadow, Mencius on natural phenomena, the 17th-century English mystic John Heydon (who Pound remembered from his days working with Yeats) and other images relating to the worship of light including "'MontSegur, sacred to Helios". The canto then closes with more on economics.

The following canto, Canto LXXXVIII, is almost entirely derived from Benton's book and focuses mainly on John Randolph of Roanoke and the campaign against the establishment of the Bank of the United States. Pound viewed the setting up of this bank as a selling out of the principles of economic equity on which the U.S. Constitution was based. At the centre of the canto there is a passage on monopolies that draws on the lives and writings of Thales of Miletus, the emperor Antoninus Pius and St. Ambrose, among others.

Canto LXXXIX continues with Benton and also draws on Alexander del Mar's A History of Money Systems. The same examples of good rule are drawn on, with the addition of the Emperor Aurelian. Possibly in defence of his focus on so much "unpoetical" material, Pound quotes Rodolphus Agricola to the effect that one writes "to move, to teach or to delight" (ut moveat, ut doceat, ut delectet), with the implication that the present cantos are designed to teach. The naturalists Alexander von Humboldt and Louis Agassiz are mentioned in passing.

Apart from a passing reference to Randolph of Roanoke, Canto XC moves to the world of myth and love, both divine and sexual. The canto opens with an epigraph in Latin to the effect that while the human spirit is not love, it delights in the love that proceeds from it. The Latin is paraphrased in English as the final lines of the canto. Following a reference to signatures in nature and Yggdrasil, the poet introduces Baucis and Philemon, an aged couple who, in a story from Ovid's Metamorphoses, offer hospitality to the gods in their humble house and are rewarded. In this context, they may be intended to represent the poet and his wife.

This canto then moves to the fountain of Castalia on Parnassus. This fountain was sacred to the Muses and its water was said to inspire poetry in those who drank it. The next line, "Templum aedificans not yet marble", refers to a period when the gods were worshiped in natural settings prior to the rigid codification of religion as represented by the erection of marble temples. The "fount in the hills fold" and the erect temple (Templum aedificans) also serve as images of sexual love.

Pound then invokes Amphion, the mythical founder of music, before recalling the San Ku/St Hilaire/Jacques de Molay/Eriugena/Sagetrieb cluster from Canto LXXXVII. Then the goddess appears in a number of guises: the moon, Mother Earth (in the Randolph reference), the Sibyl (last encountered in the context of the American Revolution in Canto LXIV), Isis and Kuanon. In a litany, she is thanked for raising Pound up (m'elevasti, a reference to Dante's praise of his beloved Beatrice in the Paradiso) out of hell (Erebus).

The canto closes with a number of instances of sexual love between gods and humans set in a paradisiacal vision of the natural world. The invocation of the goddess and the vision of paradise are sandwiched between two citations of Richard of St. Victor's statement ubi amor, ibi oculuc est ("where love is, there the eye is"), binding together the concepts of love, light and vision in a single image.

Canto XCI continues the paradisiacal theme, opening with a snatch of the "clear song" of Provençe. The central images are the invented figure Ra-Set, a composite sun/moon deity whose boat floats on a river of crystal. The crystal image, which is to remain important until the end of The Cantos, is a composite of frozen light, the emphasis on inorganic form found in the writings of the mystic Heydon, the air in Dante's Paradiso, and the mirror of crystal in the Chou King among other sources. Apollonius of Tyana appears, as do Helen of Tyre, partner of Simon Magus and Justinian and his consort Theodora. These couples can be seen as variants on Ra-Set.

Much of the rest of the canto consists of references to mystic doctrines of light, vision and intellection. There is an extract from a hymn to Diana from Layamon's 12th-century poem Brut. An italicised section, claiming that the 1913 foundation of the Federal Reserve Bank, which took power over interest rates away from Congress, and the teaching of Karl Marx and Sigmund Freud in American universities ("beaneries") are examples of what Julien Benda termed La trahison des clercs, contains anti-Semitic language. Towards the close of the canto, the reader is returned to the world of Odysseus; a line from Book Five of the Odyssey tells of the winds breaking up the hero's boat and is followed shortly by Leucothea, "Kadamon thugater" or Cadmon's daughter) offering him her veil to carry him to shore ("my bikini is worth yr raft").

An image of the distribution of seeds from the sacred mountain opens Canto XCII, continuing the concern with the relationship between natural process and the divine. The kernel of this canto is the idea that the Roman Empire's preference for Christianity over Apollonius and its lack respect for its currency resulted in the almost total loss of the "true" religious tradition for a thousand years. A number of neoplatonic philosophers, familiar from earlier cantos but with the addition of Avicenna, are listed as representing a fine thread of light in these Dark Ages.

Canto XCIII opens with a quote, "A man's paradise is his good nature", taken from The Maxims of King Kati to His Son Merikara. The canto then proceeds to look at examples of benevolent action by public figures that, for Pound, illustrate this maxim. These include Apollonius making his peace with animals, Saint Augustine on the need to feed people before attempting to convert them, and Dante and Shakespeare writing on distributive justice, an aspect of their work that the poet points out is generally overlooked. Central to this aspect is a fragment from Dante, non-fosse cive, taken from a passage in Paradiso, Canto VIII, in which Dante is asked "would it be worse for man on earth if he were not a citizen?" and unhesitatingly answers in the affirmative.

Towards the end of the canto, the Make it new ideograms from Canto LIII reappear as the poem moves back towards the world of myth, closing with another phrase from the Divine Comedy, this time from Purgatorio, Canto XXVIII. The phrase tu mi fai rimembrar translates as "you remind me" and comes from a passage in which Dante addresses Matilda, the presiding spirit of the Garden of Eden. What she reminds him of is Persephone at the moment that she is abducted by Hades and the spring flowers fell from her lap. This blending of a pagan sense of the divine into a Christian context stands for much of what appealed to Pound in medieval mysticism.

We return to the world of books in Canto XCIV. The canto opens with the name of Hendrik van Brederode, a lost leader of the Dutch Revolution, forgotten while William I, Prince of Orange is remembered. This name is lifted from correspondence between John Adams and Benjamin Rush which was finally published in 1898 by Alexander Biddle, a descendant of Pound's "villain" Nicholas. The rest of the canto consists mainly of paraphrases and quotations from Philostratus' Life of Apollonius. At its conclusion, the poem returns to the world of light via Ra-Set and Ocellus.

Canto XCV opens with the word "LOVE" in block capitals and recaps many of the Rock Drill examples of the relationship between love, light and politics. A passage deriving polis from a Greek root word for ploughing also returns us to Pound's belief that society and economic activity are based on natural productivity. The canto, and sequence, then closes with an extended treatment of the passage from the fifth book of the Odyssey in which a drowning Odysseus/Pound is rescued by Leucothea.

== XCVI–CIX (Thrones) ==
First published as Thrones: 96–109 de los cantares. New York: New Directions, 1959.

Thrones was the second volume of cantos written while Pound was incarcerated in St. Elizabeths. In the same 1962 interview, Pound said of this section of the poem: "The thrones in Dante's Paradiso are for the spirits of the people who have been responsible for good government. The thrones in The Cantos are an attempt to move out from egoism and to establish some definition of an order possible or at any rate conceivable on earth … Thrones concerns the states of mind of people responsible for something more than their personal conduct."

The opening canto of the sequence, Canto XCVI, begins with a fragmentary synopsis of the decline of the Roman Empire and the rise of the Byzantine Empire in the east and of the Carolingian Empire, Germanic kingdoms and the Lombards in Western Europe. This culminates in a detailed passage on the Book of the Prefect (or Eparch; in Greek the Eparchikon Biblion), a 9th-century edict of the Emperor Leo VI the Wise. This document, which was based on Roman law, lays out the rules that governed the Byzantine Guild system, including the setting of just prices and so on. The original Greek is quoted extensively and an aside claiming the right to write for a specialist audience is included. The close attention paid to the actual words prefigures the closer focus on philology in this section of the poem. This focus on words ties in closely with what Pound referred to as the method of "luminous detail", in which fragments of language intended to form the most compressed expression of an image or idea act as tesserae in the making of these late cantos.

Canto XCVII draws heavily on Alexander del Mar's History of Monetary Systems in a survey ranging from Abd al Melik, the first Caliph to strike distinctly Islamic coinage, through Athelstan, who helped introduce the guild system into England, to the American Revolution. The canto closes with a passage that sees the return of the goddess as moon and Fortuna together with Greek forms of solar worship and the Flamen Dialis that is intended to integrate gold and silver as attributes of coin and the divine.

After an opening passage that draws together many of the main themes of the poem through images of Ra-Set, Ocellus on light (echoing Eriugena), the tale of Gassire's Lute, Leucothoe's rescue of Odysseus, Helen of Troy, Gemisto, Demeter, and Plotinus, Canto XCVIII turns to the Sacred Edict of the emperor K'ang Hsi. This is a 17th-century set of maxims on good government written in a high literary style, but later simplified for a broader audience. Pound draws on one such popular version, by Wang the Commissioner of the Imperial Salt Works in a translation by F.W. Baller. Comparison is drawn between this Chinese text and the Book of the Prefect, and the canto closes with images of light as divine creation drawn from Dante's Paradiso.

K'ang Hsi's son Iong Cheng published commentaries on his father's maxims and these form the basis for Canto XCIX. The main theme of this canto is one of harmony between human society and the natural order, and a number of passing references are made to related items from earlier cantos: Confucius, Kati, Dante on citizenship, the Book of the Prefect and Plotinus amongst them. Canto C covers a range of examples of European and American statesman who Pound sees as exemplifying the maxims of the Sacred Edict to a greater or lesser extent. At the core of this canto, the motif of Luecothoe's veil (kredemnon) resurfaces; this time, the hero has reached the safety of the shore and returns the magic garment to the goddess.

The focus of Canto CI is around the Greek phrase kalon kagathon ("the beautiful and good"), which calls to mind Plotinus' attitude to the world of things and the more general Greek belief in the moral aspect of beauty. This canto introduces the figure of St. Anselm of Canterbury, who is to feature over the rest of this section of the long poem. Canto CII returns to the island of Calypso and Odysseus' voyage to Hades from Book Ten of the Odyssey. There are a number of references to vegetation cults and sacrifices, and the canto closes by returning to the world of Byzantium and the decline of the Western Empire.

Cantos CIII and CIV range over a number of examples of the relationships between war, money and government drawn from American and European history, mostly familiar from earlier sections of the work. The latter canto is notable for Pound's suggestion that both Honoré Mirabeau in his imprisonment and Ovid in his exile "had it worse" than Pound in his incarceration.

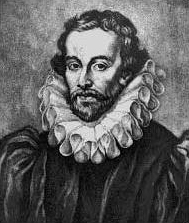
Sir Edward Coke: "the clearest mind ever in England" (Canto CVII).

At the core of Canto CV are a number of citations and quotations from the writings of St. Anselm. This 11th-century philosopher and inventor of the ontological argument for the existence of God who wrote poems in rhymed prose appealed to Pound because of his emphasis on the role of reason in religion and his envisioning of the divine essence as light. In the 1962 interview already quoted, Pound points to Anselm's clash with William Rufus over his investiture as part of the history of the struggle for individual rights. Pound also claims in this canto that Anselm's writings influenced Cavalcanti and François Villon.

Canto CVI turns to visions of the goddess as fertility symbol via Demeter and Persephone, in her lunar, love aspect as Selena, Helen and Aphrodite Euploia ("of safe voyages") and as hunter Athene (Proneia: "of forethought," the form in which she is worshiped at Delphi) and Diana (through quotes from Layamon). The sun as Zeus/Helios also features. These vision fragments are cross-cut with an invocation of the Taoist Kuan Tzu (Book of Master Kuan). This work argues that the mind should rule the body as the basis of good living and good governance.

Another such figure, Sir Edward Coke, dominates the final three cantos of this section. These cantos, CVII, CVIII, CIX, consist mainly of "luminous details" lifted from Coke's Institutes, a comprehensive study of English law up to his own time. In Canto CVII, Coke is placed in a river of light tradition that also includes Confucius, Ocellus and Agassiz. This canto also refers to Dante's vision of philosophers that reveal themselves as light in the Paradiso. In Canto CVIII, Pound highlights Coke's view that minting coin "Pertain(s) to the King onely" and has passages on sources of state revenue. He also draws a comparison between Coke and Iong Cheng. A similar parallel between Coke and the author of the Book of the Eparch is highlighted in Canto CIX.

The canto and section end with a reference to the following lines from the second canto of the Paradiso—

O voi che siete in piccioletta barca,
desiderosi d’ascoltar, seguiti
dietro al mio legno che cantando varca,

tornate a riveder li vostri liti:
non vi mettete in pelago, ché forse,
perdendo me, rimarreste smarriti.

—which read, in the translation by Charles Eliot Norton, "O ye, who are in a little bark, desirous to listen, following behind my craft which singing passes on, turn to see again Your shores; put not out upon the deep; for haply losing me, ye would remain astray." This reference signalled Pound's intent to close the poem with a final volume based on his own paradisiacal vision.

== Drafts and fragments of Cantos CX–CXVII ==
First published as Drafts and Fragments of Cantos CX–CXVII. New York: New Directions, 1969.

In 1958, Pound was declared incurably insane and permanently incapable of standing trial. Consequent on this, he was released from St Elizabeths on condition that he return to Europe, which he promptly did. At first, he lived with his daughter Mary in the Tyrol, but soon returned to Rapallo. In November 1959, Pound wrote to his publisher James Laughlin (speaking in the third person) that he "has forgotten what or which politics he ever had. Certainly has none now". His crisis of belief, together with the effects of aging, meant that the proposed paradise cantos were slow in coming and turned out to be radically different from anything the poet had envisaged.

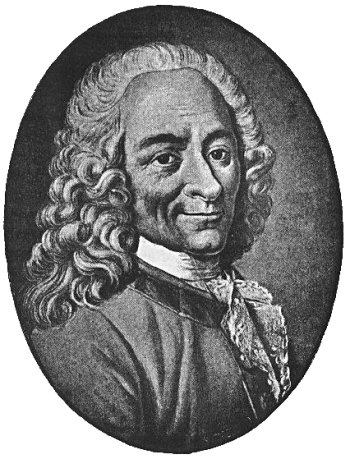
Voltaire, who said "I hate no one / not even Fréron" (Canto CXIV), reflecting the theme of confronting hatred in this section of the poem.

Pound was reluctant to publish these late cantos, but the appearance in 1967 of a pirate edition of Cantos 110–116 forced his hand. Laughlin pushed Pound to publish an authorised edition, and the poet responded by supplying the more-or-less abandoned drafts and fragments he had, plus two fragments dating from 1941. The resulting book, therefore, can hardly be described as representing Pound's definitive planned ending to the poem. This situation has been further complicated by the addition of more fragments in editions of the complete poem published after the poet's death. One of these was labelled "Canto CXX" at one point, on no particular authority. This title was later removed.

Although some of Pound's intention to "write a paradise" survives in the text as we have it, especially in images of light and of the natural world, other themes also intrude. These include the poet's coming to terms with a sense of artistic failure, and jealousies and hatreds that must be faced and expiated.

Canto CX opens with a pun on the word wake, conflating the wake of the little boat from the end of the previous canto and an image of Pound waking in his daughter's house in the Tyrol, both from sleep and, by extension, from the nightmare of his prolonged incarceration. The goddess appears as Kuanon, Artemis and Hebe (through her characteristic epithet Kallistragalos, "of fair ankles"), the goddess of youth. The Buddhist painter Toba Sojo represents directness of artistic handling.

The Noh figure of Awoi (from AOI NO UE), ravaged by jealousy, reappears together with the poet Ono no Komachi, the central character in two more Noh plays translated by Pound. She represents a life spent meditating on beauty which resulted in vanity and ended in loss and solitude. The canto draws to a close with the phrase Lux enim ("light indeed") and an image of the oval moon.

Pound's "nice, quiet paradise" is seen, in the notes for Canto CXI, to be based on serenity, pity, intelligence and individual acceptance of responsibility as illustrated by the French diplomat Talleyrand. This theme is continued in the short extract titled from Canto CXII, which also draws on the work of the anthropologist and explorer Joseph F. Rock in recording legends and religious rituals from China and Tibet. Again, this section of the poem closes with an image of the moon.

Canto CXIII opens with an image of the sun moving through the zodiac, the first of a number of cycle images that occur through the canto, recalling a line from Pound's version of AOI NO UE: "Man's life is a wheel on the axle, there is no turn whereby to escape". A reference to Marcella Spann, a young woman whose presence in the Tyrol further complicated the already strained relationships between the poet, his wife Dorothy and his lover Olga Rudge, casts further light on the recurrent jealousy theme. The phrase "Syrian onyx" lifted from his 1919 Homage to Sextus Propertius, where it occurs in a section that paraphrases Propertius' instructions to his lover on how to behave after his death, reflects the elderly Pound's sense of his own mortality.

The theme of hatred is addressed directly at the opening of Canto CXIV, where Voltaire is quoted to the effect that he hates nobody, not even his archenemy Elie Fréron. The remainder of this canto is primarily concerned with recognising indebtedness to the poet's genetic and cultural ancestors. The short extract from Canto CXV is a reworking from an earlier version first published in the Belfast-based magazine Threshold in 1962 and centres around two main ideas. The first of these is the hostilities that existed among Pound's modernist friends and the negative impact that it had on all their works. The second is the image of the poet as a "blown husk", again a borrowing from the Noh, this time the play Kakitsubata.

Canto CXVI was the last canto completed by Pound. It opens with a passage in which we see the Odysseus/Pound figure, homecoming achieved, reconciled with the sea-god. However, the home achieved is not the place intended when the poem was begun but is the terzo cielo ("third heaven") of human love. The canto contains the following well-known lines:

I have brought the great ball of crystal;

Who can lift it?

Can you enter the great acorn of light?
But the beauty is not the madness
Tho' my errors and wrecks lie about me.
And I am not a demigod,
I cannot make it cohere.

This passage has often been taken as an admission of failure on Pound's part, but the reality may be more complex. The crystal image relates back to the Sacred Edict on self-knowledge and the demigod/cohere lines relate directly to Pound's translation of the Women of Trachis. In this, the demigod Herakles cries out "WHAT SPLENDOUR / IT ALL COHERES" as he is dying. These lines, read in conjunction with the later "i.e. it coheres all right / even if my notes do not cohere", point toward the conclusion that towards the end of his effort, Pound was coming to accept not only his own "errors" and "madness" but the conclusion that it was beyond him, and possibly beyond poetry, to do justice to the coherence of the universe. Images of light saturate this canto, culminating in the closing lines: "A little light, like a rushlight / to lead back to splendour". These lines again echo the Noh of Kakitsubata, the "light that does not lead on to darkness" in Pound's version.

This final complete canto is followed by the two fragments of the 1940s. The first of these, "Addendum for C", is a rant against usury that moves a bit away from the usual anti-Semitism in the line "the defiler, beyond race and against race". The second is an untitled fragment that prefigures the Pisan sequence in its nature imagery and its reference to Jannequin.

Notes for Canto CXVII et seq. originally consisted of three fragments, with a fourth, sometimes titled Canto CXX, added after Pound's death. The first of these has the poet raising an altar to Bacchus (Zagreus) and his mother Semele, whose death was as a result of jealousy. The second centres on the lines "that I lost my center / fighting the world", which were intended as an admission of mistakes made as a younger man. The third fragment is the one that is also known as Canto CXX. It is, in fact, some rescued lines from the earlier version of Canto CXV, and has Pound asking forgiveness for his actions from both the gods and those he loves. The final fragment returns to beginnings with the name of François Bernonad, the French printer of A Draft of XVI Cantos. After quoting two phrases from Bernart de Ventadorn's Can vei la lauzeta mover, a poem in which the speaker determines to abandon love because he has been rejected, the fragment closes with the line "To be men, not destroyers." This stood as the close of The Cantos until later editions appended the two Italian cantos LXXII and LXXIII and a brief dedicatory fragment addressed to Olga Rudge.

== Controversy ==
The Cantos has always been controversial; initially so because of the experimental nature of the writing. The controversy has intensified since 1940 when Pound's public approval for Mussolini's fascism became widely known. Much critical discussion of the poem has focused on the relationship between, on the one hand, the economic thesis on usura, Pound's anti-Semitism, his adulation of Confucian ideals of government and his attitude towards fascism, and, on the other, passages of lyrical poetry and the historical scene-setting that he performed with his "ideographic" technique. At one extreme, George P. Elliot has drawn a parallel between Pound and Adolf Eichmann based on their anti-Semitism while at the other Marjorie Perloff places Pound's anti-Semitism in a wider context by relating it to the political attitudes of many of his contemporaries, and says, "We have to try to understand why and not say let's get rid of Ezra Pound, who also happens to be one of the greatest poets of the 20th C." In another exercise in contextualisation, Wendy Stallard Flory (1939) made a close study of the poem and concluded that it contains, in all, seven passages of anti-Semitic sentiment in the 803 pages of the edition she used.

Pound has always had serious if select defenders and disciples. Louis Zukofsky was both of these, and also Jewish; according to Cookson he defended Pound on the basis of personal knowledge from anti-Semitism on the level of human exchange, even though, as reported by Basil Bunting, their correspondence contained some of Pound's "offensive" views. What is more, Zukofsky's similarly formidable but distinctive long poem "A" follows in its ambitious scope the model of The Cantos.

== Legacy ==
Despite all the controversy surrounding both poem and poet, The Cantos has been influential in the development of English-language long poems since the appearance of the early sections during the 1920s. Among poets of Pound's own generation, both H.D. and William Carlos Williams wrote long poems that show this influence. Almost all of H.D.'s poetry from 1940 onwards takes the form of long sequences, and her Helen in Egypt, written during the 1950s, covers much of the same Homeric ground as The Cantos (but from a feminist perspective), and the three sequences that make up Hermetic Definition (1972) include direct quotations from Pound's poem. In the case of Williams, his Paterson (1963) follows Pound in using incidents and documents from the early history of the United States as part of its material. As with Pound, Williams includes Alexander Hamilton as the villain of the piece.

Pound was a major influence on the Objectivist poets, and the effect of The Cantos on Zukofsky's "A" has already been noted. The other major long work by an Objectivist, Charles Reznikoff's Testimony (1934–1978), follows Pound in the direct use of primary source documents as its raw material. In the next generation of American poets, Charles Olson also drew on Pound's example in writing his own unfinished Modernist epic, The Maximus Poems.

Pound was also an important figure for the poets of the Beat Generation, especially Snyder and Allen Ginsberg. Snyder's interest in things Chinese and Japanese stemmed from his early reading of Pound's writings, and his long poem Mountains and Rivers Without End (1965–1996) reflects his reading of The Cantos in many of the formal devices used. In Ginsberg's development, reading Pound was influential in his move away from the long, Whitmanesque lines of his early poetry, and towards the more varied metric and inclusive approach to a variety of subjects in the single poem that is to be found especially in his book-length sequences Planet News (1968) and The Fall of America: Poems of These States (1973). More generally, The Cantos, with its wide range of references and inclusion of primary sources, including prose texts, can be seen as prefiguring found poetry. Pound's tacit insistence that this material becomes poetry because of his action in including it in a text he chose to call a poem also prefigures the attitudes and practices that underlie 20th-century Conceptual art.

The poetic response to The Cantos is summed up in Bunting's poem, "On the Fly-Leaf of Pound's Cantos":

There are the Alps. What is there to say about them?
They don't make sense. Fatal glaciers, crags cranks climb,
jumbled boulder and weed, pasture and boulder, scree,
et l'on entend, maybe, le refrain joyeux et leger.
Who knows what the ice will have scraped on the rock it is smoothing?

There they are, you will have to go a long way round
if you want to avoid them.
It takes some getting used to. There are the Alps,
fools! Sit down and wait for them to crumble!

== See also ==
- List of cultural references in The Cantos
