= Iron Horse Trail, Ontario =

Recreational trail in Canada

Iron Horse Trail
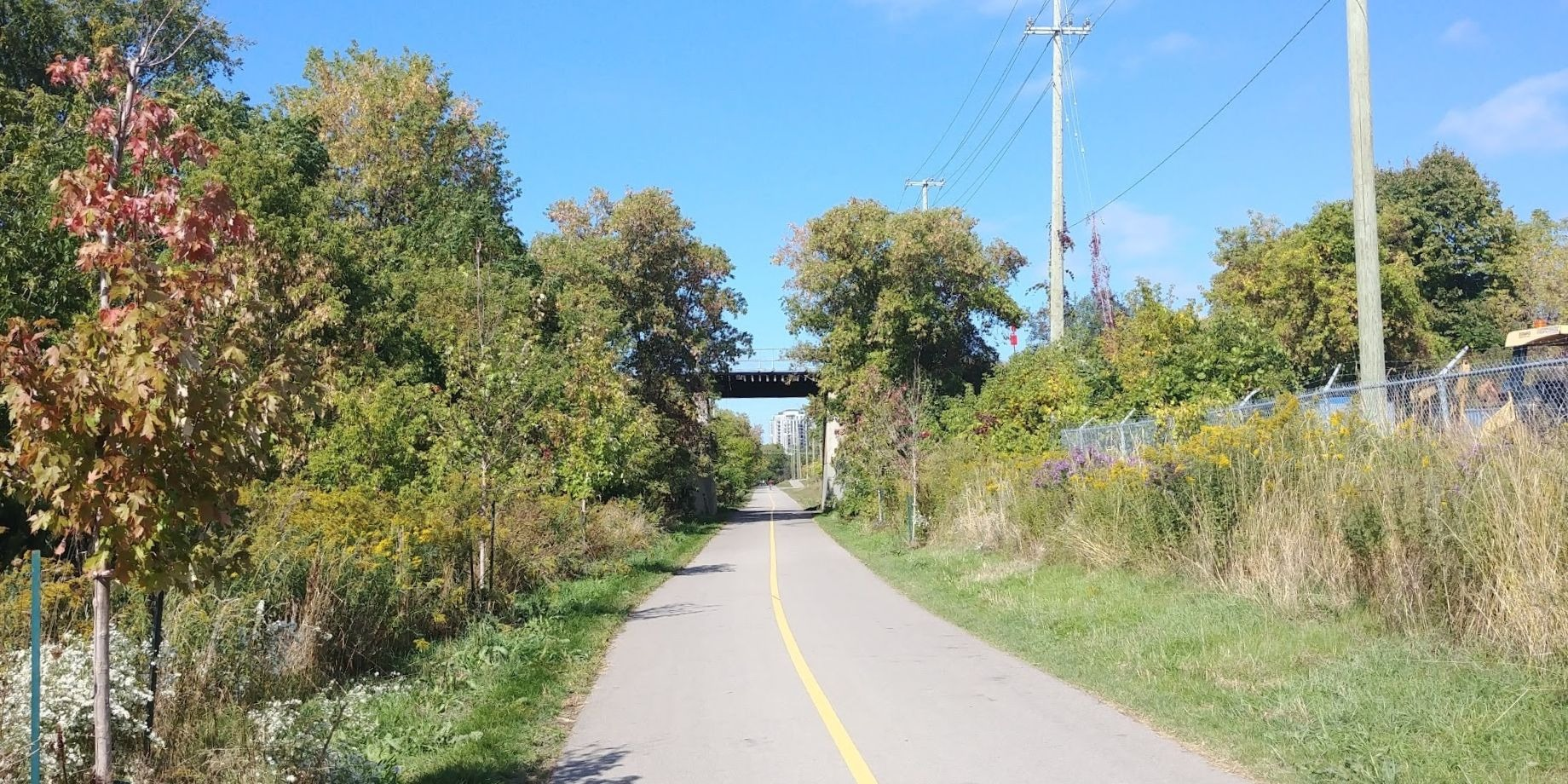
- Length: 5.5 km (3.4 mi)
- Location: Waterloo and Kitchener, Ontario, Canada
- Established: 1997
- Designation: Trans Canada Trail
- Trailheads: Waterloo: Erb Street West; Kitchener: Ottawa Street South
- Use: Walking; cycling
- Hazards: Frequent at-grade crossings with roadways
- Surface: Asphalt
- Right of way: Grand River Railway (partial)
- Maintained by: City of Kitchener, City of Waterloo
Trail map

The Iron Horse Trail is a multi-use urban rail trail which connects the cities of Waterloo and Kitchener, Ontario, Canada. It runs from Erb Street West in the north near Uptown Waterloo, to Ottawa Street South in Kitchener to the south. It covers a distance of 5.5 kilometres (3.4 mi). The trail was opened on 5 October 1997 on abandoned Canadian Pacific Railway right of way sections, including portions of the right-of-way of the now-defunct Grand River Railway. The two cities combined resources to purchase the property. It is a part of the Trans Canada Trail.

== History ==
=== Background ===
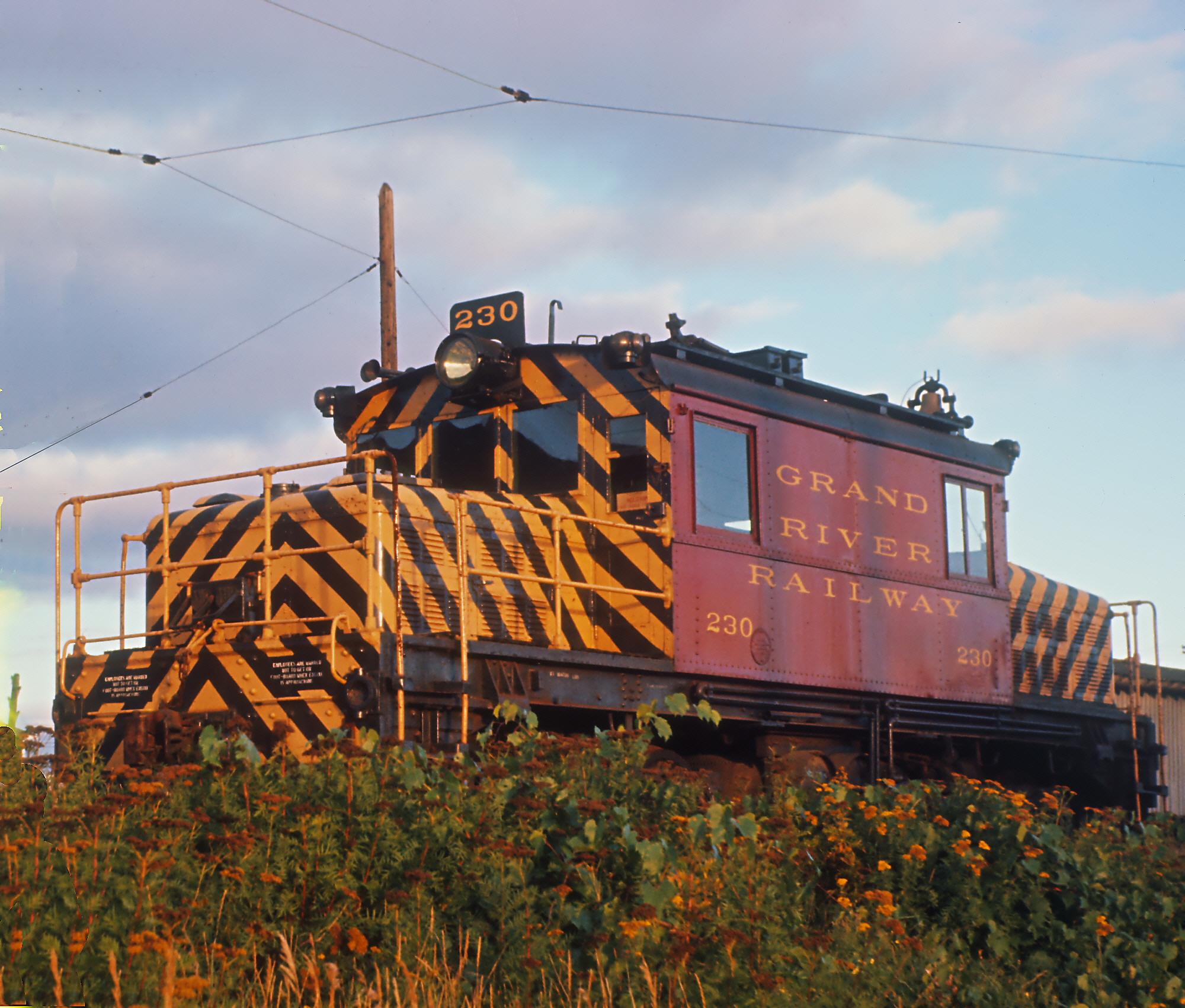
A Grand River Railway freight locomotive in 1963.

Much of the Iron Horse Trail's right of way was originally used for the northern section of the Grand River Railway's main line. The Grand River Railway was an interurban electric railway, which was typical in design and operations for its heyday in the 1920s. Originally terminating at Erb Street in what is now Uptown Waterloo, the line ran south all the way to Galt (via Freeport and Preston), ending at Galt's Main Street, where it joined with the Lake Erie and Northern Railway, which connected Galt with Port Dover via Brantford.

The Grand River Railway was popular with passengers during the period bookended by the two world wars, but suffered from several problems in the 1950s. Increased suburbanization in the area drew populations of commuters into new suburbs which weren't served by the railway, and corresponding increased automobile traffic caused problems due to the GRNR's numerous at-grade crossings, an issue shared by the Iron Horse Trail today. Passenger service was discontinued in 1955, and as portions of the line were closed by CP Rail (the GRNR's parent company), the former right of way was given over to redevelopment, especially in southern Kitchener. Beyond Ottawa Street, the right of way is now lost to redevelopment in the form of the Rockway Municipal Golf Course, suburban residential housing, the Conestoga Parkway, and Highway 8. Other parts of the GRNR right of way are still owned by CP Rail and used for freight operations, which in some areas represent parallel tracks which were used to enable the old two-way electric passenger service.

The portion of the right of way which was converted into the Iron Horse Trail has seen a number of changes in its environment over the years: the northern stretch, which once ran through farm fields, now runs through the Belmont Village and Cherry Hill areas, and the southern portion ends at the Rockway area, which was also developed in the mid-20th century. In contrast, the central section, running just to the south of the Victoria Park neighbourhood, is largely unchanged due to the endurance of the area's 19th-century housing stock. Though once running along the western edge of Kitchener, the right of way now runs through some relatively dense urban areas, giving it its current utility as a pedestrian and cycling thoroughfare with frequent connections to the road system, in contrast to many of the recreational hiking trails in the region, which tend to run through mostly-undeveloped natural areas.

=== Recent history ===
Since its creation, traffic on the trail has increased, and the infrastructure and amenities have gradually been improved. In 2015, over 180,000 people used the trail during a four-month spring-summer period. At that time, the most-travelled section of the trail was the northern, and the least-travelled was the southern section near Ottawa Street.

In 2017, as the Region of Waterloo advanced its plans to shift intercity transit from the Charles Street Terminal and Kitchener station locations to a new transit hub at King and Victoria Streets adjacent to the then-future Ion rapid transit Kitchener Central Station, regional and municipal governments began to explore the possibility of creating a branch of the Iron Horse Trail which would connect to the new transit hub location. Councillors disagreed, however, on the route to be taken, with some willing to accept a less direct route (called Hybrid 2–3) which would (from west to east) diverge from the Iron Horse Trail main route and follow the south side of Gage Avenue, cut through Raddatz Park, follow Waverly Road, pass through Cherry Park, follow along Park Street, and then parallel the CN Huron Spur to the south until reaching Central Station. A simpler and more direct route, Alternative 1, was also proposed, which would simply parallel the Guelph Subdivision until reaching King and Victoria.

Safety issues at crossings have been discussed for a number of years, especially as the number of trail users increased. In January 2018, the City of Kitchener agreed to make some changes in the area that many trail users take to cross that street. At the time, the City indicated that an additional section of the trail would be completed by the end of 2019. On 9 September 2019, a cyclist riding along the trail was struck by a motorist while traversing the uncontrolled crossing at Victoria Street, and was subsequently airlifted to hospital. The City of Kitchener renewed its promise for safety upgrades to the area, proposing a refuge island as an improvement to be rolled into its general trail upgrades.

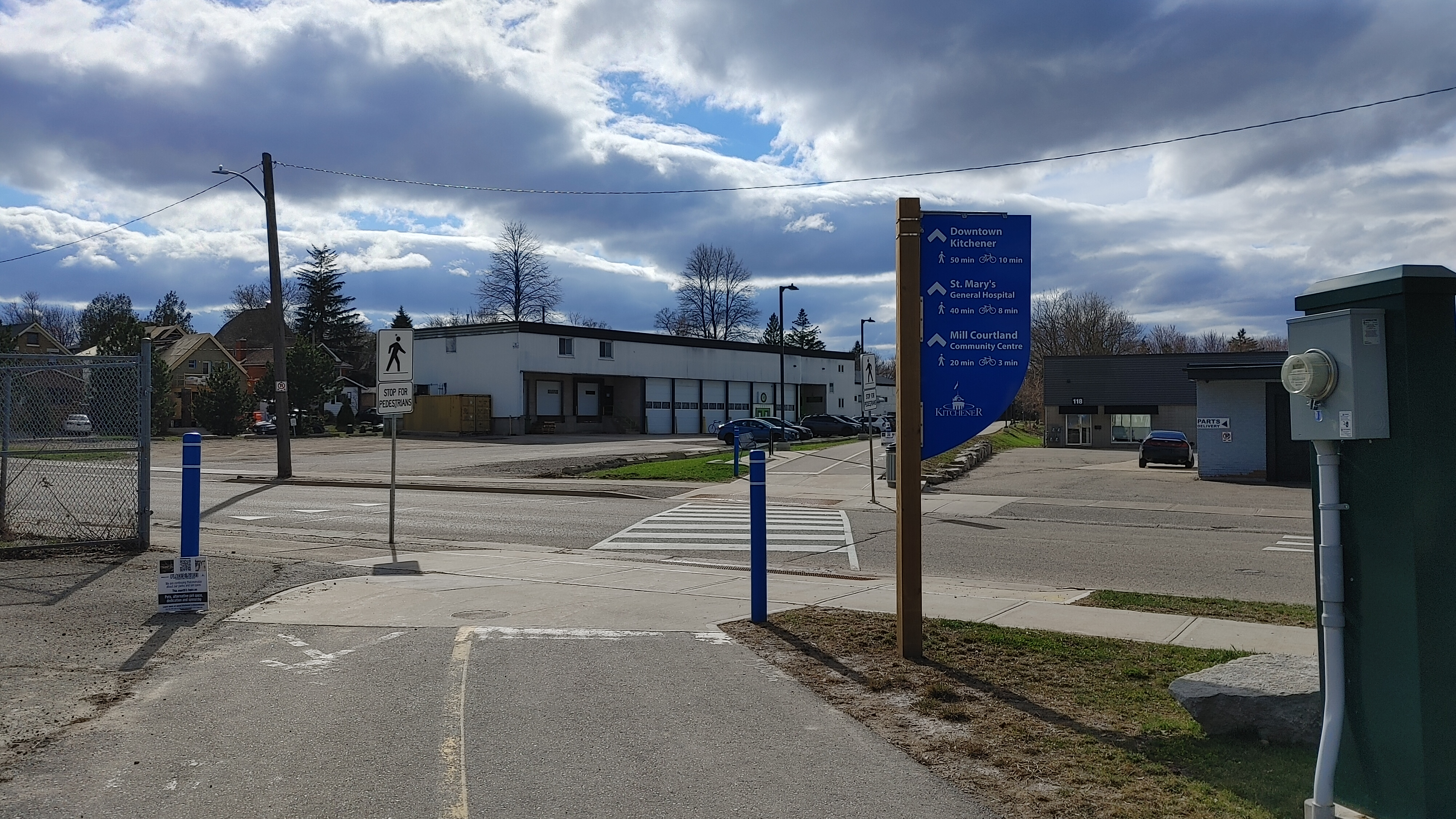
Wayfinding signage at the Kent Avenue crossing in south Kitchener.

The City of Kitchener began a set of comprehensive trail upgrades in 2019, starting with the southern section from Queen Street to Ottawa Street from June to October, and the northern section from John Street to Queen Street from September through the fall. Major features of the upgrade include a focus on rolling out some previous trail improvements to particular areas, such as new benches, lighting, and widening, across the whole trail, as well as implementing new, standardized wayfinding signage, creating a distinctive image for the Iron Horse and making trail entry points easier to find from the street, as well as helping trail users find destinations.

In 2020, it was announced that over $900,000 in joint federal and provincial funding was being allocated to further trail improvements as part of a larger $24 million funding package dedicated to public transit and active transportation in Waterloo Region. These improvements would comprise around 5 kilometres (3.1 mi) of additional pedestrian paths and bikeways intended primarily to better connect the main Iron Horse Trail route to public transit.

== Industrial artifacts ==
A number of artifacts from Kitchener-Waterloo's industrial heritage are displayed along the Iron Horse Trail's route. These include:

- Compression Transfer Press at Peter Street
- Trueing Fixture at Mill Street
- Bull Gear at Cherry Street
- Punch Press at John Street

== See also ==
- Spurline Trail
- Transport in Kitchener, Ontario
- Iron Horse Trail (disambiguation)
- List of rail trails
- List of trails in Canada
