= John Penrose Angold =

John Penrose Angold (c. 1909 – 31 December 1943) was a British poet and translator who died while serving with the RAF during World War II. A Collected Poems appeared in 1952. His death is lamented in Ezra Pound's Pisan Cantos.
