= Iron Horse Trail =

Iron Horse Trail may refer to:

- Iron Horse Trail, Alberta, in Canada
- Iron Horse Trail, Ontario, in Canada
- Iron Horse Trail (Montgomery County, Ohio): See List of rail trails in the United States § Ohio
- Iron Horse Trail (Stark County, Ohio): See List of rail trails in the United States § Ohio
- Iron Horse Trail, Pennsylvania, in the Tuscarora State Forest
- Iron Horse Regional Trail, in the San Francisco Bay Area in California
- Iron Horse State Park in Washington, United States, also known as the Iron Horse Trail
