= Iron Horse District =

There are several Boy Scouts of America geographic regions called the Iron Horse District:

- Iron Horse District - Crossroads of America Council, BSA (Indiana)
- Iron Horse District - Golden Empire Council, BSA (California)
- Iron Horse District - Mount Diablo Silverado Council, BSA (California)
- Iron Horse District - Northeastern Pennsylvania Council, BSA (Pennsylvania)
