= Planet News =

Book by Allen Ginsberg

First edition

Planet News is a book of poetry written by Allen Ginsberg and published by City Lights Bookstore in 1968. It is number twenty three in the Pocket Poets series. It contains poems written by Ginsberg between 1961 and 1967, many written during his travels to India, Japan, Europe, Africa, and many other places. Poems in this collection include:

- "Television was a Baby Crawling Toward that Deathchamber"
- "This form of Life needs Sex"
- "Stotras to Kali Destroyer of Illusions"
- "Describe: The Rain on Dasaswamedh"
- "Death News"—about his first reactions upon hearing of the death of William Carlos Williams
- "The Change: Kyoto-Tokyo Express"
- "Why is God Love, Jack?"—addressing Jack Kerouac
- "After Yeats"
- "I am a Victim of Telephone"
- "Kral Majales"—about being nominated "The King of May"
- "Who Be Kind To"
- "First Party at Ken Kesey's with Hell's Angels"
- "Wichita Vortex Sutra"
- "City Midnight Junk Strains"
- "Wales Visitation"
