= Iron Horse (board game) =

Iron Horse is a 1983 board game published by Icarus Games.

== Gameplay ==
Iron Horse is a game in which the historical era involving the railroad network in the United States divided the country into a transportation system spanning North America.

== Reception ==
Creede Lambard reviewed Iron Horse in Space Gamer No. 69. Lambard commented that "I recommend the game, but those of us who prefer a more challenging railroad simulation should stick to Rail Baron or Empire Builder (or HO layouts). Anyone who comes to play without thoroughly washing and drying his hands should be tied up and left on the track in front of a speeding freight train."
