= Iron Horse Brewery =

Brewery in Washington, US

- Type: Brewery
- Location: 1621 Vantage Hwy, Ellensburg, Washington, USA
- Annual production volume: 22,300 barrels (2019)
- Website: ironhorsebrewery.com

Iron Horse Brewery is an independent craft brewery and brew pub operator in Ellensburg, Washington, USA. As of 2019, the brewery is the sixth largest producer of beer in Washington at 22,300 barrels.

== Beers ==
The Iron Horse Brewery produces Quilter's Irish Death, a dark beer that has a beer rating of 87 (very good) from Beer Advocate.

Beer Made by Iron Horse Brewery
Beer	ABV	Description	Availability
Cozy Sweater	5.00%	Vanilla milk stout	September - December
High Five Hefe	6.00%	American Hefeweizen with Ginger and Honey	Year-Round
Irish Death	7.80%	Dark, Smooth Ale	Year-Round
Mel's Magic	6.80%	India Pale Ale, Reference to Ellensburg legend Mel's Hole	Year-Round
Send It	5.25%	Dry hopped Pale Ale	Year-Round
Timothy Hay-z	6.25%	Hazy India Pale Ale	Year-Round

Irish Death Seasonal Variations
Beer	ABV	Description	Approx. Availability
PB & Death	6.53%	Ale, brewed with peanut butter	January - April
Aloha Death	6.53%	Ale, brewed with coconut	May - August
Mocha Death	7.50%	Ale, brewed with coffee and cocoa	October - December

== Locations ==
=== Brewery ===
Iron Horse Brewery operates in a 17,342 square foot production facility just outside the city limits of Ellensburg, WA. The production facility is only available to visit through scheduled tours.

The production facility space houses a 30bbl brewhouse, fermentation tanks, brite tanks, a centrifuge, a canning line, a bottling line, a kegging line, quality control testing equipment, and cold storage. Iron Horse beer is shipped from that location to bars, restaurants, and grocery stores in Alaska, Idaho, Montana, Oregon, and Washington. In 2020, Iron Horse started shipping beer directly to consumers.

=== Pub ===
Iron Horse Brewery operates a brewpub with a patio in historic downtown Ellensburg, WA. The 412 N Main St location is said to be the origin of the Great Ellensburg Fire. As of January 2021, the downtown Ellensburg location has closed. A new brewpub location opened in June 2022 in Ellensburg.
