= Wales Visitation =

1967 poem by Allen Ginsberg

"Wales Visitation", also styled as "Wales—A Visitation", is a poem by Allen Ginsberg written in July 1967 while Ginsberg was staying in Wales with his British publisher Tom Maschler. The poem makes reference to Romantic literary traditions and utilises imagery of the Welsh landscape. It was published in The New Yorker on 11 May 1968 and also in Ginsberg's collection Planet News in the same year.

== Background and inspiration ==
Ginsberg had been invited by R. D. Laing to speak at the Dialectics of Liberation Congress in London in July 1967.

After the conference, Ginsberg travelled with Tom Maschler to Wales and, according to Ginsberg's biographer Barry Miles, they stopped at Tintern Abbey on July 29 to allow Ginsberg access to the same source of inspiration as Wordsworth. They stayed at Maschler's stone cottage called Carney in the Black Mountains near Capel-y-ffin.

The pair took LSD and, in the fifth hour of the acid trip, Ginsberg wrote the poem.

== Form and content ==
The poem is written in free verse and has nine stanzas.

Ginsberg employs a cataloguing technique, commonly used in Walt Whitman's poetry (who Ginsberg was strongly influenced by), in which descriptions of many entities of the landscape are presented to provide the reader with a rich absorbing image of the natural environment.

The most prevalent poetic device Ginsberg employs is personification, which helps to unite the objects described in the poem by recognising the humanity in all entities, ultimately building upon the primary theme of the poem, oneness.

== Cultural impact ==
Ginsberg was interviewed on May 7 1968 by William F. Buckley Jr. on his television show Firing Line and he recited the poem in front of Buckley and the live audience.

Philip Glass composed a piece of music called Echorus in the winter of 1994–95 for the Compassion Through Music project. This was first performed in 1996 with Ginsberg reading his poem Sunflower Sutra over the music. In a later recording in 2001 with the Czech Philharmonic Chamber Orchestra, Echorus was performed again but with Wales Visitation being recited instead.

An exhibition was installed at the National Museum Cardiff called "Wales Visitation: Poetry, Romanticism and Myth in Art" in 2014, in which the poem was used as a origin to explore other works that were inspired by or connected to the culture and landscape of Wales.
