= Iron Horse (poem) =

Book by Allen Ginsberg

First edition

Iron Horse is a poem written by Allen Ginsberg. It is an important part of his The Fall of America: Poems of These States sequence of poems written in the mid-to-late 1960s. Iron Horse was published in January 1973 by Coach House Press of Toronto, Canada. Also in 1973 in Göttingen, Germany by Udo Breger's Expanded Media Editions. The first American edition was a 1974 booklet by City Lights Bookstore in San Francisco.

== Content ==
The first part of Iron Horse was composed July 22, 1966, as Ginsberg rode a train from the West Coast to Chicago. It was initially dictated to tape and later transcribed. The second part of the poem takes place on a Greyhound bus.

The poem is typified by its fluctuating observations, and uses many of the same devices and expressions found in other poems in The Fall of America.

Some of the topics Ginsberg touches upon in the poem include: a group of soldiers riding the train some of them probably on their way to Vietnam and their mentality; a nostalgic feeling for his past and youth, ruminations on his own public persona, entertaining the thought of retiring to some solitary life; current events, headlines, conversations (overheard or imaginary) taking place on the train, and sights; both on and off the train.

== Notes ==
- Schumacher, Michael. (1992) Dharma Lion. St. Martins Press, New York. ISBN 0-312-11263-7
