= Liverpool Giants =

The Liverpool Giants are a set of giant marionettes built by French theatre company Royal de Luxe and displayed in a series of shows in Liverpool, in England.

The shows were:

- Sea Odyssey: Giants Spectacular in 2012, featuring their Little Girl, Uncle (Diver) and Dog (Xolo) giants
- Memories of August 1914 in 2014, featuring the Grandmother, Little Girl and Xolo
- Liverpool's Dream in 2018, featuring the Little Boy, Adult (Castaway) and Xolo

== See also ==
- La Princesse, a giant mechanical spider shown in Liverpool in 2008 by French company La Machine
