= Voyage à Nantes =

Tourism and arts organisation in France

- Company type: Arts festival
- Founded: 2011
- Headquarters: Nantes, France
- Key people: Jean Blaise
- Website: levoyageanantes.fr

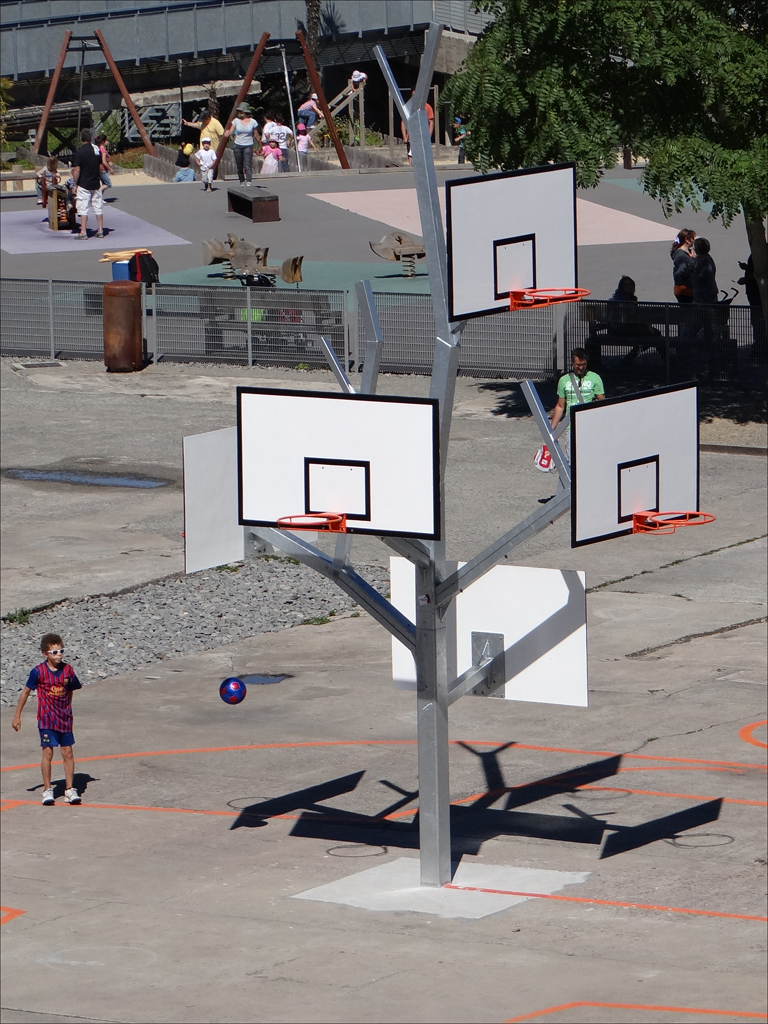
L'arbre à Basket

The Voyage à Nantes is a tourist organisation which promotes the culture of Nantes in Pays de la Loire, France. It was created in 2011 as a société publique locale (local public company). The name also refers to a number of permanent public artworks in the area, as well as a yearly summer festival.

Each year since 2012, for the months of July and August, the Voyage à Nantes event hosts a number of cultural activities, mostly free of charge. All over the city of Nantes, a route with around 50 locations is marked by a green line painted on the ground which allows visitors to discover original, contemporary artworks alongside heritage sites, architecture and numerous viewpoints of the town and parts of Estuaire, an open-air art collection along the banks of the Loire river and the Saint-Nazaire coast.

Since 2022, there has been a winter edition called Voyage en Hiver.

In 2011, Nantes Metropolis (presided over at the time by Jean-Marc Ayrault) brought together the Office of Tourism, the Château des ducs de Bretagne (which includes the Nantes local history museum), les Machines de l'île and the existing Estuaire Nantes-Saint-Nazaire biennial to form a new brand called Voyage en France. Jean Blaise was appointed director.

Since its creation, the organisation has been based at 1 Rue Crucy in a former warehouse of the LU biscuit factory, designed by architect Auguste Bluysen. After the LU business moved out in the 1980s, the building was part of a reconstruction project completed in 1990 to convert it into offices.

In 2011, Gaëtan Chataigner made a promotional film, Jackie et Julie. The short film was released in spring 2012 and starred Julie Depardieu and Jackie Berroyer. In October 2012, Chataigner directed the short film Estuaire showing 28 works of art located on the estuary from Nantes to Saint-Nazaire, featuring singer Julien Doré in the lead role. The film was presented to the press and launched online on 28 January 2013.

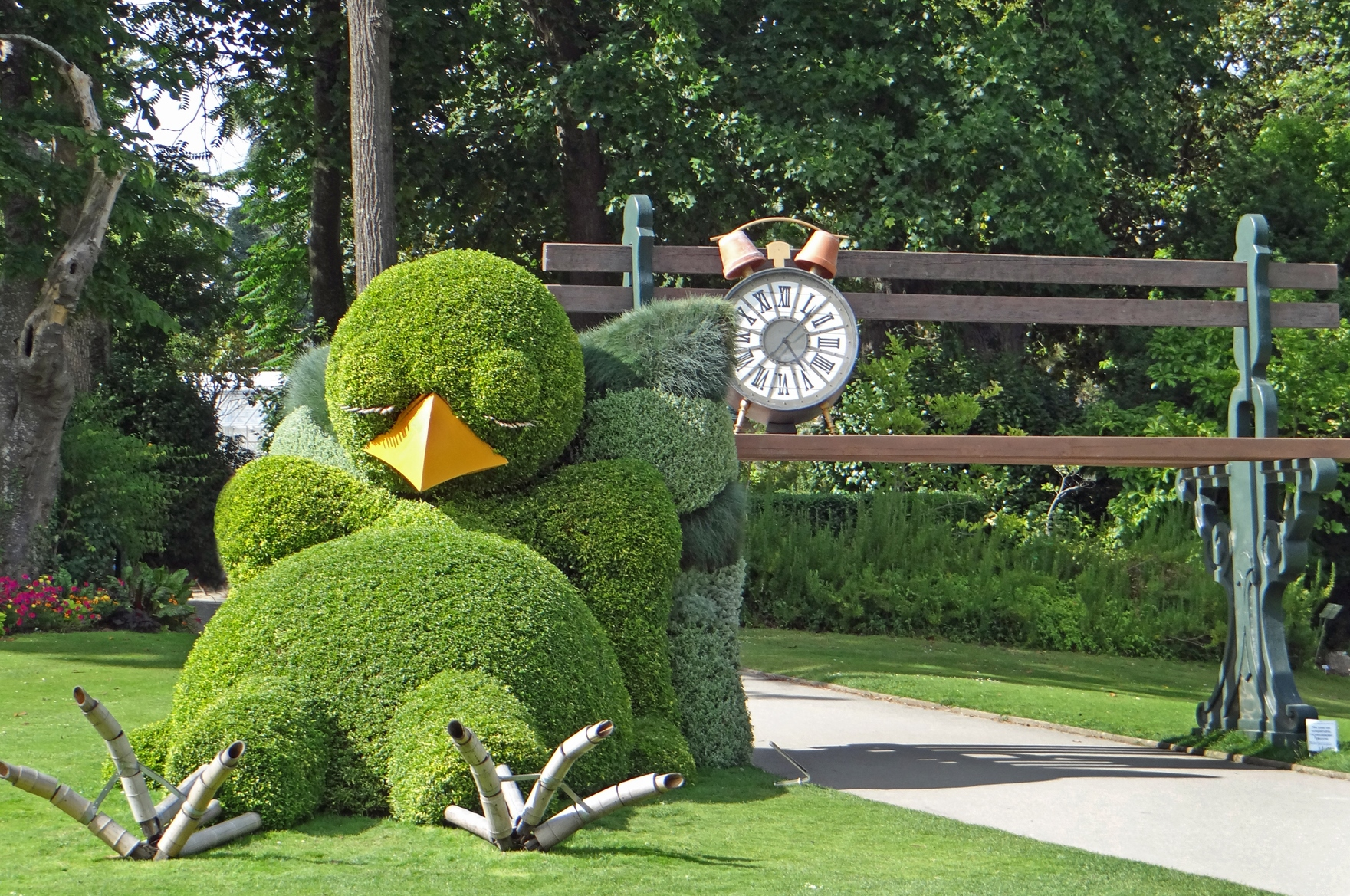
Claude Ponti's installation at the Jardin des Plantes

== Locations ==
- The Jardin des plantes de Nantes, which each year hosts landscapes designed by Claude Ponti
- Le Nid, panoramic bar on the 32nd floor of the Tour Bretagne (closed since 2020)
- The Memorial to the Abolition of Slavery, on quai de la Fosse, where 2,000 plaques represent the slave expeditions which departed from Nantes
- The Machines of the Isle of Nantes. On the site of a former shipyard, François Delarozière's La Machine company has its workshop in the Chantiers park, which is home to large animated puppets and attractions, including the Carrousel des mondes marins and
- L'Arbre à Basket in the Chantiers park, an artificial tree for playing basketball
- The Tomb of Francis II, Duke of Brittany in the cathedral.
- The Château des ducs de Bretagne located in the medieval quarter and home to the Museum of the History of Nantes.
- Le Lieu unique: former biscuit factory now home to galleries, cinema and performance spaces
- La Cantine, foodhall in a former banana warehouse
- Des stations gourmandes: picnic sites where the public can pick fruit and vegetables
