= Artichoke (company) =

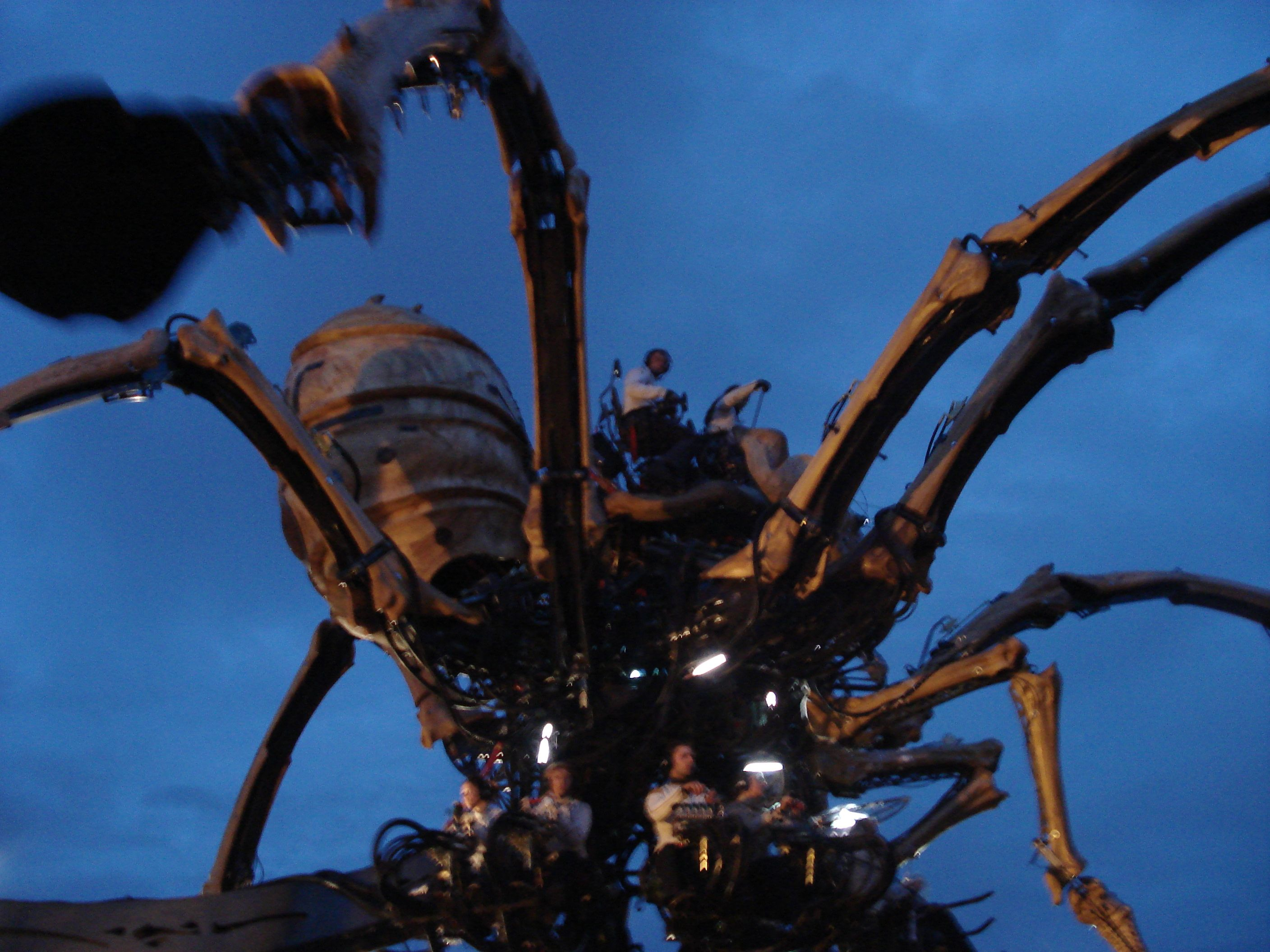
La Princesse in the streets of Liverpool, September 2008

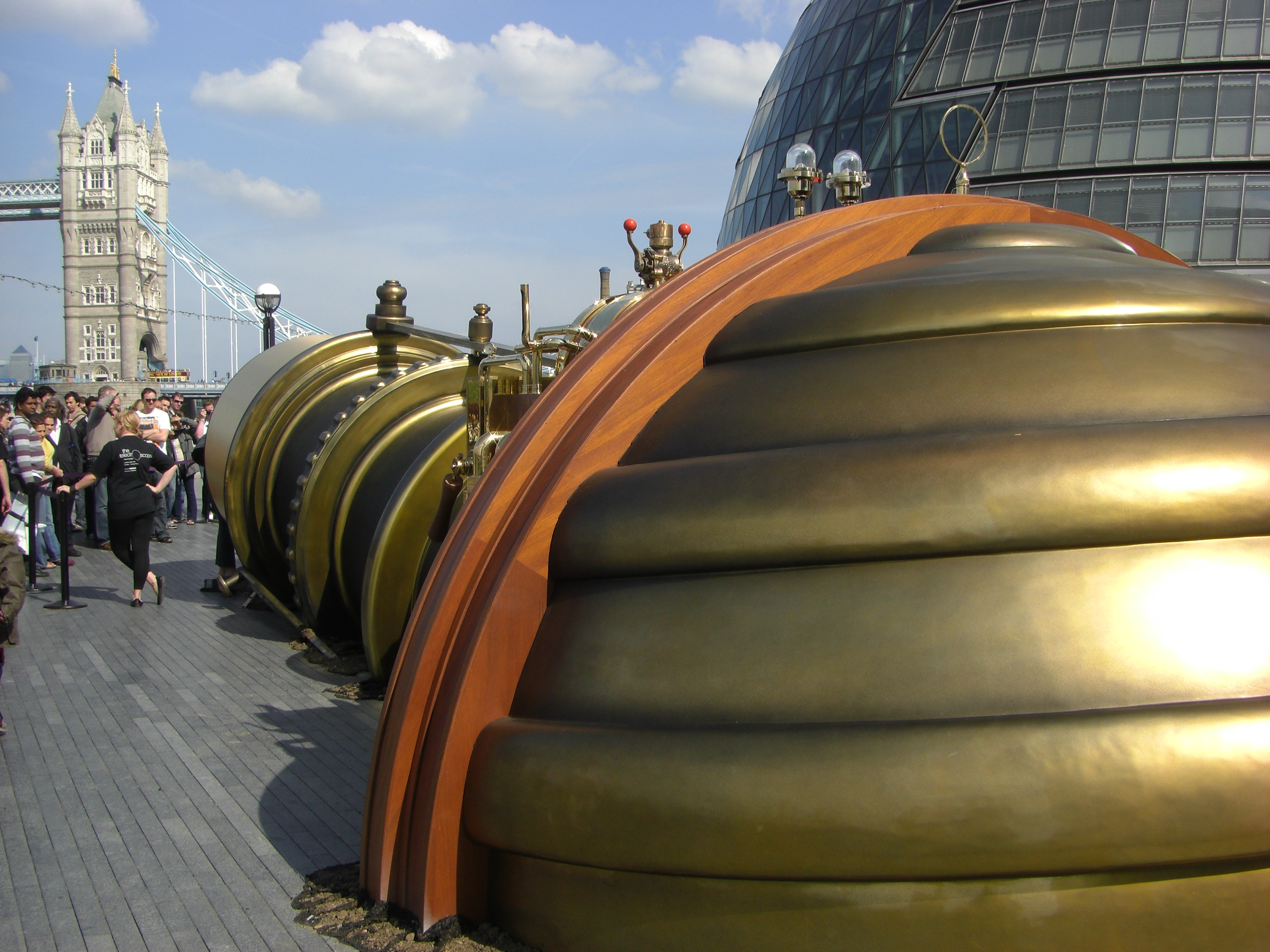
Paul St. George's Telectroscope installation at London City Hall (May 24, 2008), linking New York City and London, produced by Artichoke

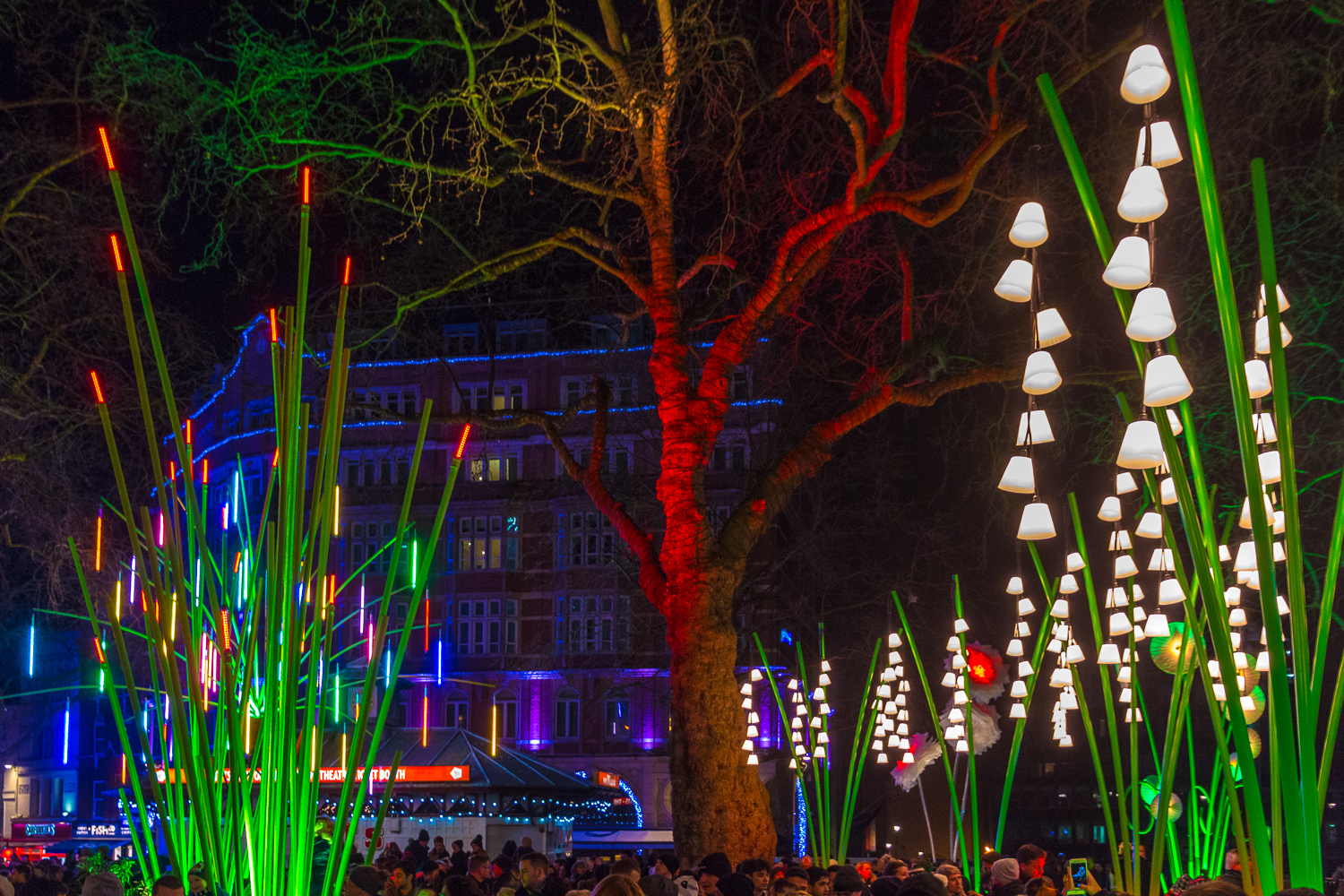
Light sculptures transform Leicester Square as part of Lumiere London 2016

Artichoke, also known as the Artichoke Trust, is a London-based British company and registered charitable trust that stages arts spectacles and live events. It was founded in 2005 by Helen Marriage, former director of the Salisbury International Arts Festival, and Nicky Webb.

== Description ==
Artichoke specialises in working in unusual places, such as streets, public spaces and the countryside, and are frequently on a large scale. The company's website states:

We don’t believe the arts should take place only behind the closed doors of our theatres and art galleries. Instead, we put on shows that, though ambitious and complex, have something to say to the widest possible audience.

The company produced French street theatre company Royal de Luxe'sThe Sultan's Elephant, the biggest piece of free theatre ever staged in London, which attracted a million people over a four-day period in 2006, and the recent event in Liverpool featuring La Machine, a giant mechanical spider. Artichoke has received praise from the press for their productions: a review in The Observer wrote: "a two-woman company called Artichoke ... are one of the most vital of theatrical forces", and Marriage and Webb transformed the Salisbury Festival from a local event into what The Times called "a miracle of modern British culture". Marriage and Webb won the 2006 Women of the Year Shine Award for an outstanding achievement in the arts, and were listed in Time Out's list of 100 Movers and Shakers in London in November of the same year. Their production of The Sultan's Elephant won the Visit London Award for Cultural Event of the Year in 2006. In October 2007 Artichoke mounted a one-day conference, Larger Than Life, on all aspects of staging large-scale productions.

The Artichoke Trust is a registered charity (Reg Charity No 1112716), funded by the Arts Council and the Calouste Gulbenkian Foundation, and raising significant funds from other trusts, foundations and businesses, as well as by public donation. Artichoke also works as a consultant through its non-charitable company, Artichoke Productions Ltd.

== Selected productions ==
Nicky Webb and Helen Marriage worked together intermittently on productions prior to founding Artichoke in 2002. In all, their productions have included:

- 1990 and 1992-3 Canary Wharf. Productions to mark the new development at Canary Wharf in London.
- 1999 Salisbury Festival: Dining with Alice at the Larmer Tree Pleasure Gardens in Wiltshire, a performance based on Alice's Adventures in Wonderland. This will be re-staged in 2009.
- 1999 Salisbury Festival: Last Words. A poetry festival without a single poem being read.
- 1999-2000 Salisbury Festival: Eye Openers in Salisbury and at Old Sarum.
- 2002 The Queen's Jubilee Commissioned for the Golden Jubilee of Queen Elizabeth II.

As Artichoke:

- 2003 Imber, a requiem for the village of Imber on Salisbury Plain, which was requisitioned by the British Army in World War II for training purposes and its inhabitants evacuated. Commissioned by Artangel.
- 2006 The Sultan's Elephant in London, in association with French performance arts company Royal de Luxe. This is the largest free public arts event ever to have been staged in London
- 2006 A Portrait of London in Trafalgar Square, created by film director Mike Figgis to mark the 50th anniversary of the London Film Festival.
- 2008 Telectroscope, in association with artist Paul St George, linking New York City and London.
- 2008 La Princesse, a giant mechanical spider that roamed the streets of Liverpool as part of the European City of Culture celebrations. In association with French performance art company La Machine.
- 2009 One & Other, Antony Gormley's Fourth Plinth project in Trafalgar Square, which placed 2400 people on the empty plinth for one hour at a time over 100 days.
- 2009 – present Lumiere, a light festival first held in Durham, containing over 20 installations and new commissions that transformed the city for four nights. Repeated in Derry and London.
- 2018 – PROCESSIONS, a mass participation artwork on 10 June 2018, with marches of women in Belfast, Cardiff, Edinburgh and London, to commemorate the 100th anniversary of the Representation of the People Act 1918, which granted suffrage to many British women.

== Related reading ==
Nicky Webb (editor), 2006, Four Magical Days in May: How an Elephant Captured the Heart of a City London: Artichoke Trust
