= Larmer Tree Gardens =

Park in Tollard Royal, Wiltshire, England

Coordinates: 50°57′6.82″N 2°4′59.86″W

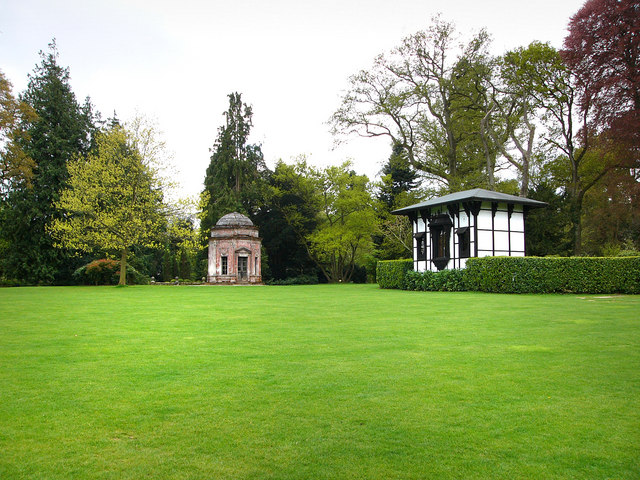
The Roman Temple and The General's Room

The Larmer Tree Gardens near Tollard Royal in south Wiltshire, England, were created by landowner Augustus Pitt Rivers in 1880 as pleasure grounds for "public enlightenment and entertainment". They were the first private gardens opened for public enjoyment in the United Kingdom, and were free to enter. The 11-acre (4.5 ha) Grade II* listed gardens are within the Rushmore Estate in Cranborne Chase, an ancient royal hunting ground and now an Area of Outstanding Natural Beauty.

== Description ==
The gardens lie in the far south of Wiltshire, on the county border with Dorset, south of Tollard Royal village and about 1 1/2 miles (2 km) southwest of Rushmore House. They cover around 11 acres (4.5 ha).

The main entrance is on the south side, where there is a two-storey lodge or caretaker's cottage, built in 1881. Apart from a central lawn the site is planted with mature trees, mostly conifers, oak, and yew, with laurel beneath, and is surrounded by further woodland on all sides except the south.

Three Grade II listed buildings dating from around 1880 surround the lawn: the Temple, in limestone ashlar, octagonal with a domed roof and pedimented doors; and two timber-framed ornamental Indian pavilions, brought here and re-erected. Originally there were six pavilions, provided as places where parties could hold picnics while being entertained from a central bandstand. In 1895 an open-air theatre with a semicircular proscenium arch was added; called the Singing Theatre, it is also Grade II listed. Other buildings are the New Pavilion and the Jubilee Hall.

The gardens are listed as Grade II* on the Register of Parks and Gardens of Special Historic Interest in England by English Heritage.

== 19th century ==
In 1880, Augustus Lane Fox inherited the Rushmore Estate, centred on Rushmore House (now part of Sandroyd School); a condition of the will was that he should change his name to Pitt Rivers. He started making the Larmer Tree Pleasure Grounds almost immediately, and they were opened to the public in 1885.

The gardens are named after the Larmer Tree, a landmark tree on the ancient county boundary. The tree was possibly an ancient Wych elm (Ulmus glabra) under which King John (1167–1216) and his entourage were reputed to have met when they were out hunting. The original tree was still living as late as 1894, around which time it was replaced by an oak, which was planted in the centre of the decayed rim.

King John deer hunting, from a manuscript in the British Library

Pitt Rivers built several structures around the main lawn which were intended to educate and enlighten visitors to the garden. There was also a racecourse, an eighteen link golf course, a bowling green and lawn tennis courts. There were eight picnic areas, each enclosed by cherry laurel (Prunus laurocerasus) hedges and with thatched buildings in case of inclement weather. Pitt Rivers provided "crockery, knives and forks for picnickers, gratis", as well as "chairs, tables and dumb waiters" and accommodation for 20 horses.

Music and entertainment was provided at the Singing Theatre, where plays were performed by workers from the estate, and poetry recitals given. A band was provided on Sunday afternoons during summer. Thousands of Vauxhall lights, hanging glass lamps lit by candles, illuminated the gardens in the evening, when there was open-air dancing. On the night that Thomas Hardy danced with Pitt River's daughter Agnes in 1895, he described the gardens as "Quite the prettiest sight I ever saw in my life".

By 1899 the gardens were attracting over 44,000 people a year, some of them making a day trip from the growing seaside resort of Bournemouth. A map of 1900 names the area as Larmer Park. After Pitt Rivers' death in that year the gardens closed, opening only occasionally after that time.

=== Thomas Hardy and the gardens ===
In early September 1895 Thomas Hardy and his wife Emma were staying with the Pitt Rivers at Rushmore. An annual sports day was held at the Larmer Tree Gardens on 4 September 1895, followed by a night-time dance. Hardy led off the country dancing with Agnes Grove, Pitt Rivers' youngest daughter and the wife of Walter (later Sir Walter) Grove. Agnes later became a literary pupil of Hardy's, and after her death in 1926 Hardy wrote the poem Concerning Agnes, reflecting on the night they first met. The first two stanzas read:

I am stopped from hoping what I have hoped before —

Yes many a time! —

To dance with that fair woman yet once more

As in the prime

Of August, when the wide-faced moon looked through

The boughs at the faery lamps of the Larmer Avenue

I could not, though I should wish, have over again

That old romance,

And sit apart in the shade as we sat then

After the dance

The while I held her hand, and, to the booms

Of contrabassos, feet still pulsed from the distant rooms.

== Restoration ==
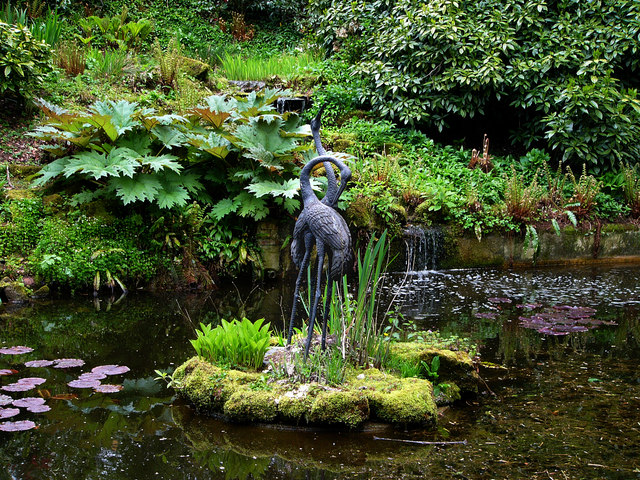
Ornamental pond

Restoration of the gardens started in 1991 under the direction of Michael Pitt-Rivers. In the 90-odd years that the gardens had been closed, the cherry laurel had taken over almost all the gardens apart from the main lawn, and many of the buildings had decayed. The gardens were re-opened to the public in 1995. In 1999 a new Larmer Tree was planted to mark the new millennium.

== Today ==
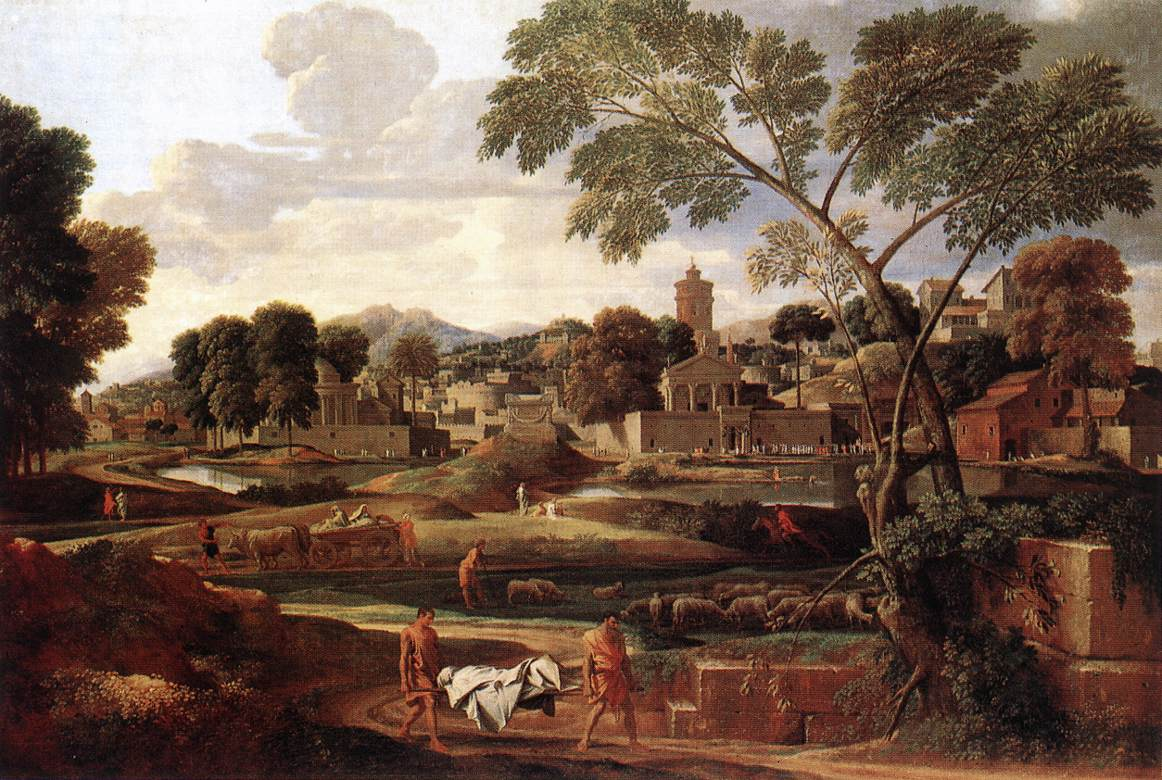
Nicolas Poussin's The Funeral of Phocion, a copy of which forms the backdrop to the open-air theatre at the Larmer Tree Gardens.

Many of the Victorian buildings, including the Nepalese Room, the Roman Temple and the Colonial-style pavilion which was originally the Tea Room, remain. The open-air theatre has a backdrop painted by the scenery department at the Welsh National Opera based on The Funeral of Phocion, a 1648 painting by Nicolas Poussin which is in the National Museum Cardiff. Wide cherry laurel-hedged rides radiate out from the lawn, leading to woodland beyond. There are displays of camellias, rhododendrons, hydrangeas and eucryphias among the other trees and shrubs. Peacocks and free-flying macaws, neither indigenous to the United Kingdom, roam the gardens.

The woods contain one of the largest discrete areas of semi-natural broad-leaved woodland in southern England, which were managed and exploited for the hazel underwood trades for many centuries, involving coppicing to produce strong, straight hazel wands.

The gardens are privately owned and are open on a fee-paying basis from Easter to the end of September each year, but closed on Fridays and weekends as they are used for weddings and events. True to the spirit of Pitt Rivers, picnickers are encouraged at the gardens, croquet equipment and deckchairs are provided at no charge, and free music is played on Sunday afternoons. The gardens have been grant-aided by English Heritage.

Film director Ken Russell first visited the gardens as a child and used the gardens in a number of his projects over the years, including The Debussy Film (1965) and The Music Lovers (1970).

== Festivals, events and concerts ==
Larmer Tree Festival in 2009

A music and arts festival, the Larmer Tree Festival, was held at the gardens in July of every year since 1990; it was cancelled in 2020 during the COVID-19 pandemic and has yet to return. Since 2006 another music festival, the End of the Road Festival, is held in late August or early September every year. The Enchanted Garden, a music festival that was part of The Big Chill, took place from 1998 to 2002.

Other events and concerts take place at the gardens throughout the summer. In 1999 Dining with Alice, based on Alice's Adventures in Wonderland and produced by Artichoke, the company that went on to produce The Sultan's Elephant and La Princesse, was performed at the gardens as part of the Salisbury International Arts Festival.
