= Le Manège d'Andrea =

Carousel in France

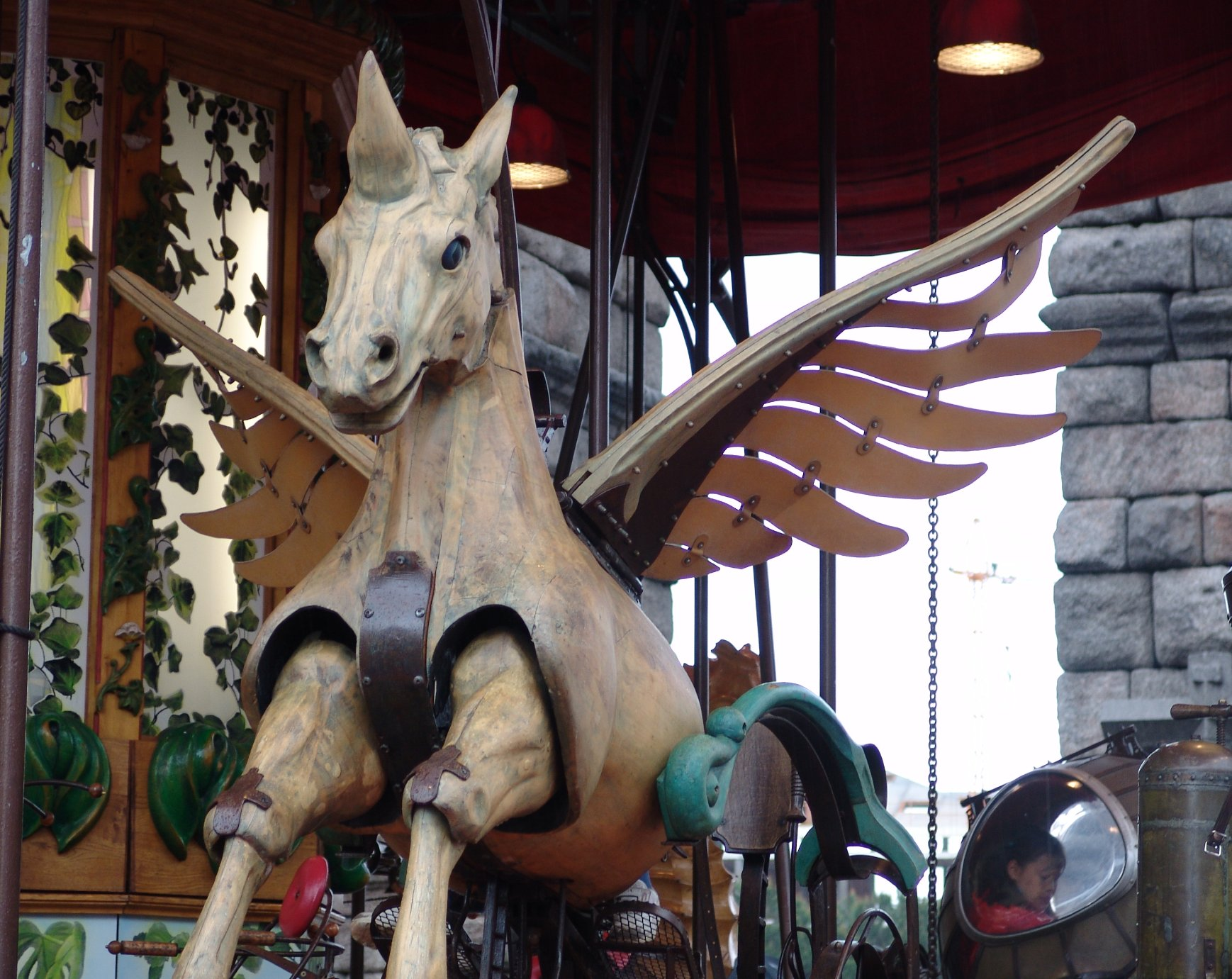
One of the horses on Le Manège d'Andrea

Le Manège d'Andrea (Andrea's Merry-go-round) is a carousel that was built by La Machine in Toulouse, France, in 1999 under the artistic and technical direction of François Delarozière. The ride was made with materials such as wood, leather, glass, iron, feathers, steel, tin and copper, together with several pieces from junk (motorbikes, electric fans, etc.). Every figure or seat has several mechanisms that can be activated by the children riding them, including a steering wheel on the Petit Poisson that turns the head and tail of the fish, a lever on the seahorse that nods its head, and a crank on a steam engine that releases "steam." The carousel is portable and travels frequently around France and neighboring countries, but is often operated in Nantes with the Machines of the Isle of Nantes, also developed by La Machine.
