= Processions (artwork) =

2018 mass participation artwork in Britain

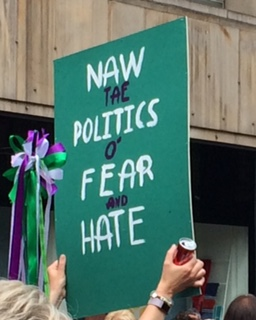
Banner at the Edinburgh PROCESSIONS

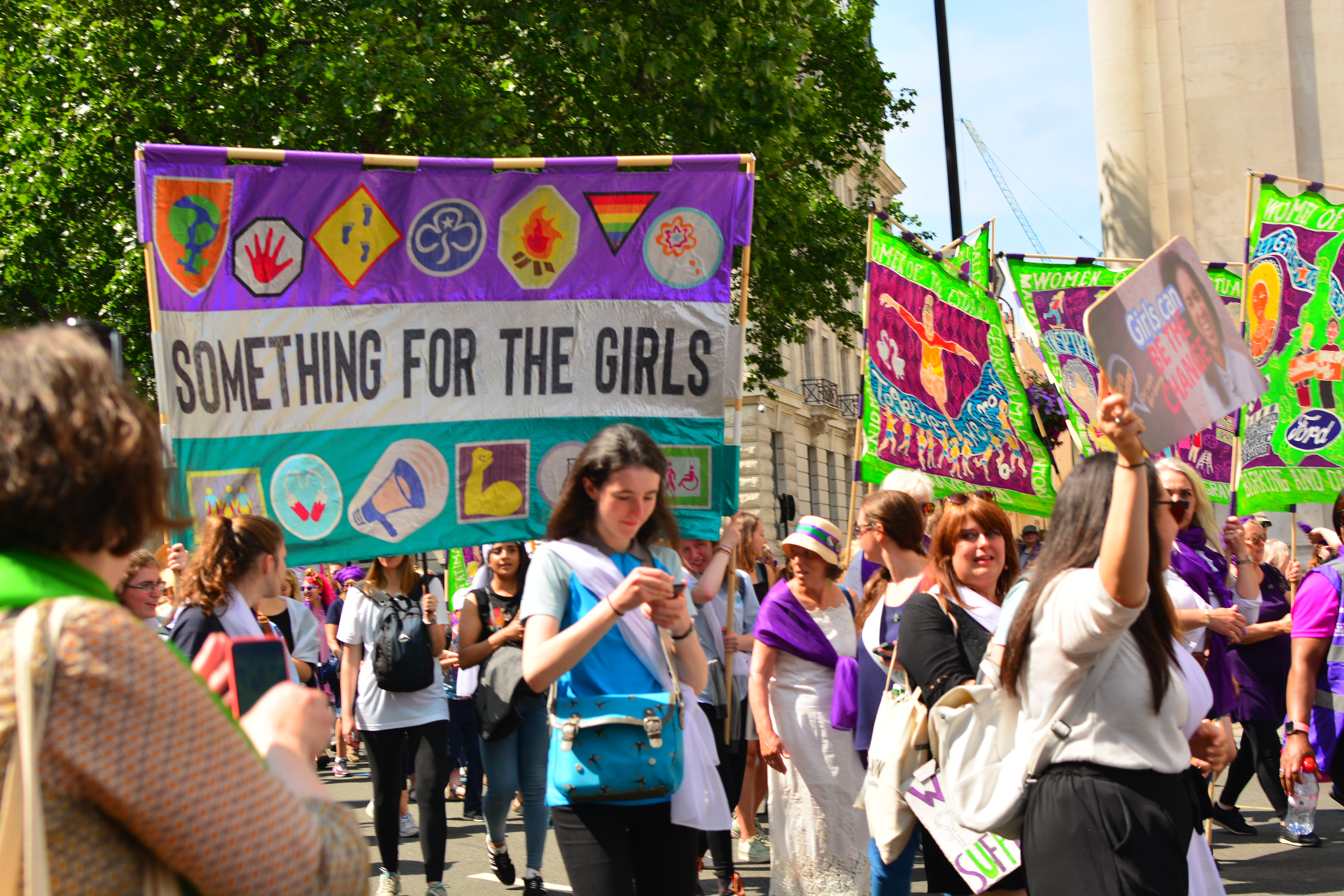
Banners at the London PROCESSIONS

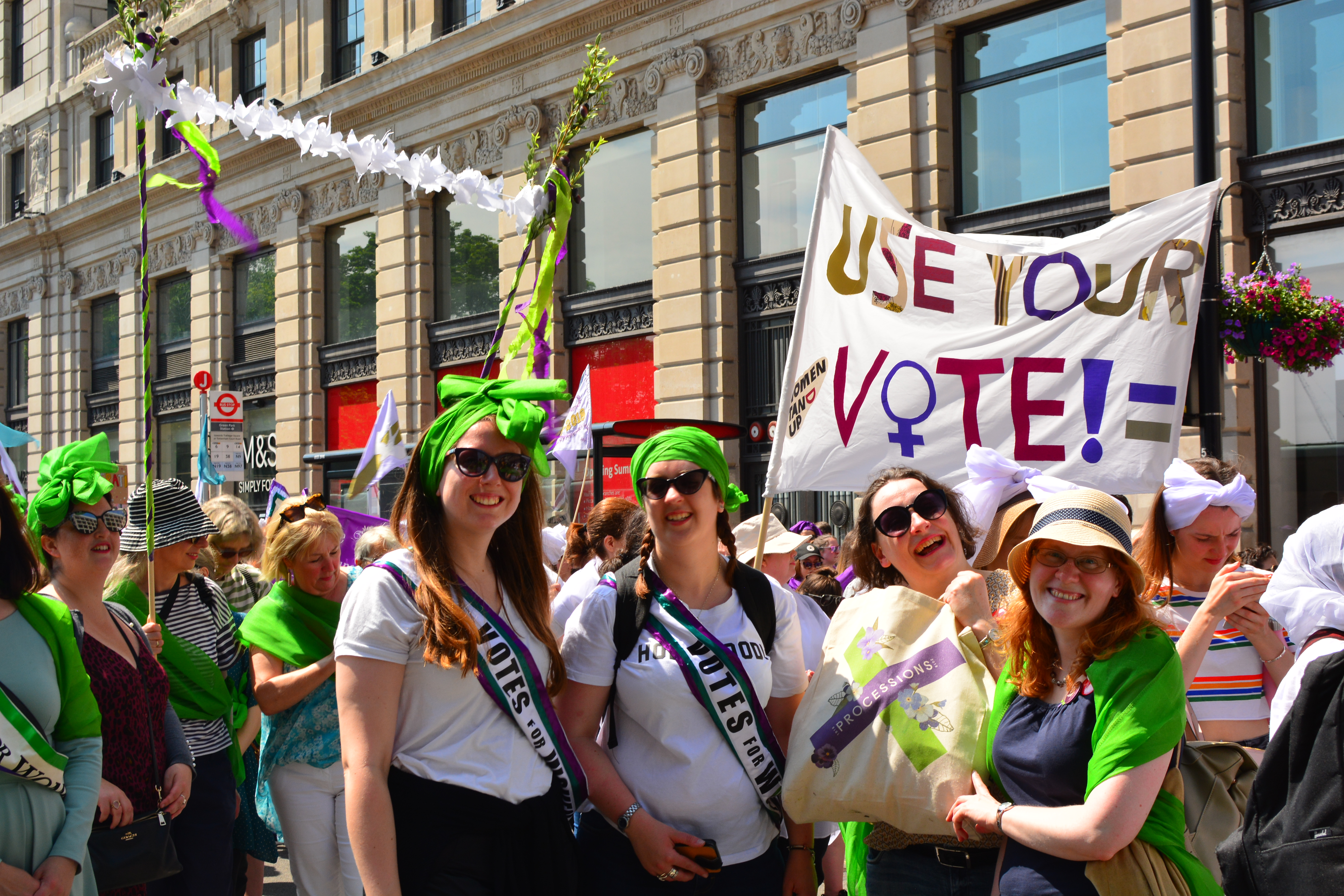
Use Your V♀te! banner

PROCESSIONS was a mass participation artwork that took place in several British cities on 10 June 2018. The piece consisted of women and girls marching in cities and "forming a living portrait of women in the 21st century and a visual expression of equality, strength and cultural representation". Many men joined women in the subsequent marches.

One hundred textile banners created by female artists were carried during the four marches. Scarves in the suffragette colours of green, white and violet were worn by the marching women in parallel streams through the cities.

The piece commemorated the 100th anniversary of the Representation of the People Act 1918, which granted suffrage to many British women. It was one of a number of works commissioned by the British government's 14–18 NOW project to mark the events of World War I in the United Kingdom.

Marches took place in Belfast, Cardiff, Edinburgh and London. The piece was produced by Artichoke.

== See also ==
- Statue of Millicent Fawcett, a statue of the suffrage campaigner Millicent Fawcett unveiled in Parliament Square as part of 14–18 NOW
