= Sea Odyssey: Giant Spectacular =

Performance art event

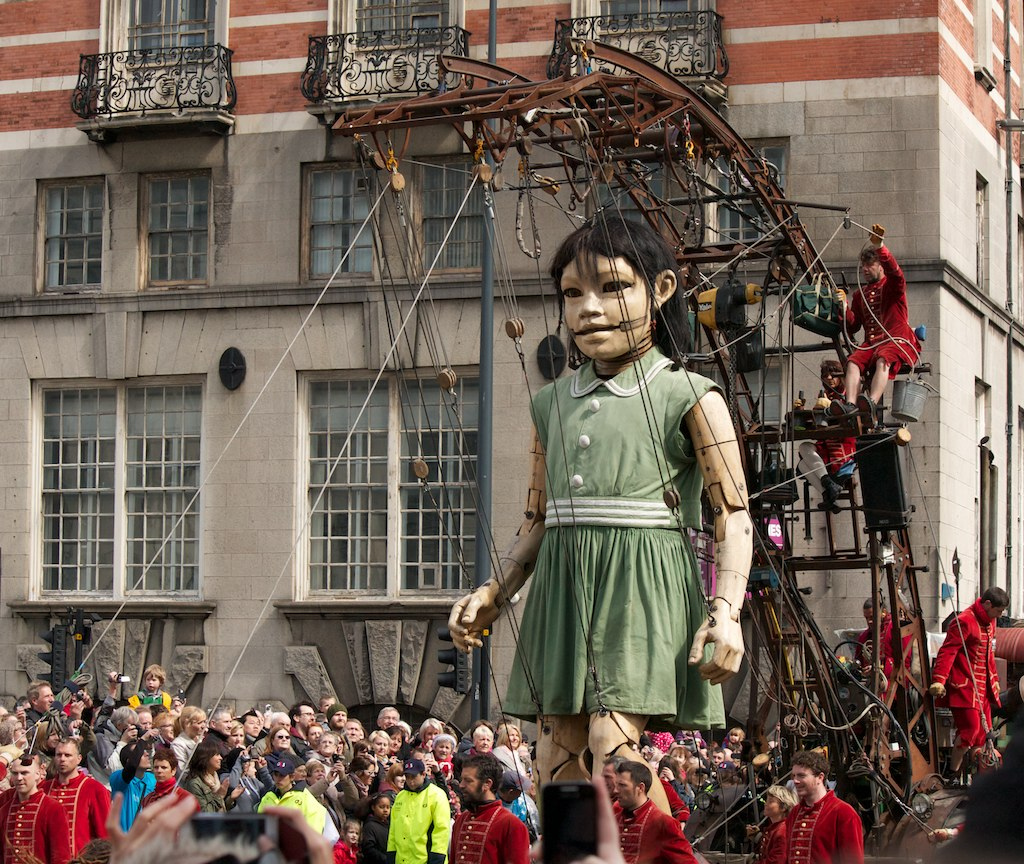
Little Girl Giant in front of Albion House – the former headquarters of White Star Line

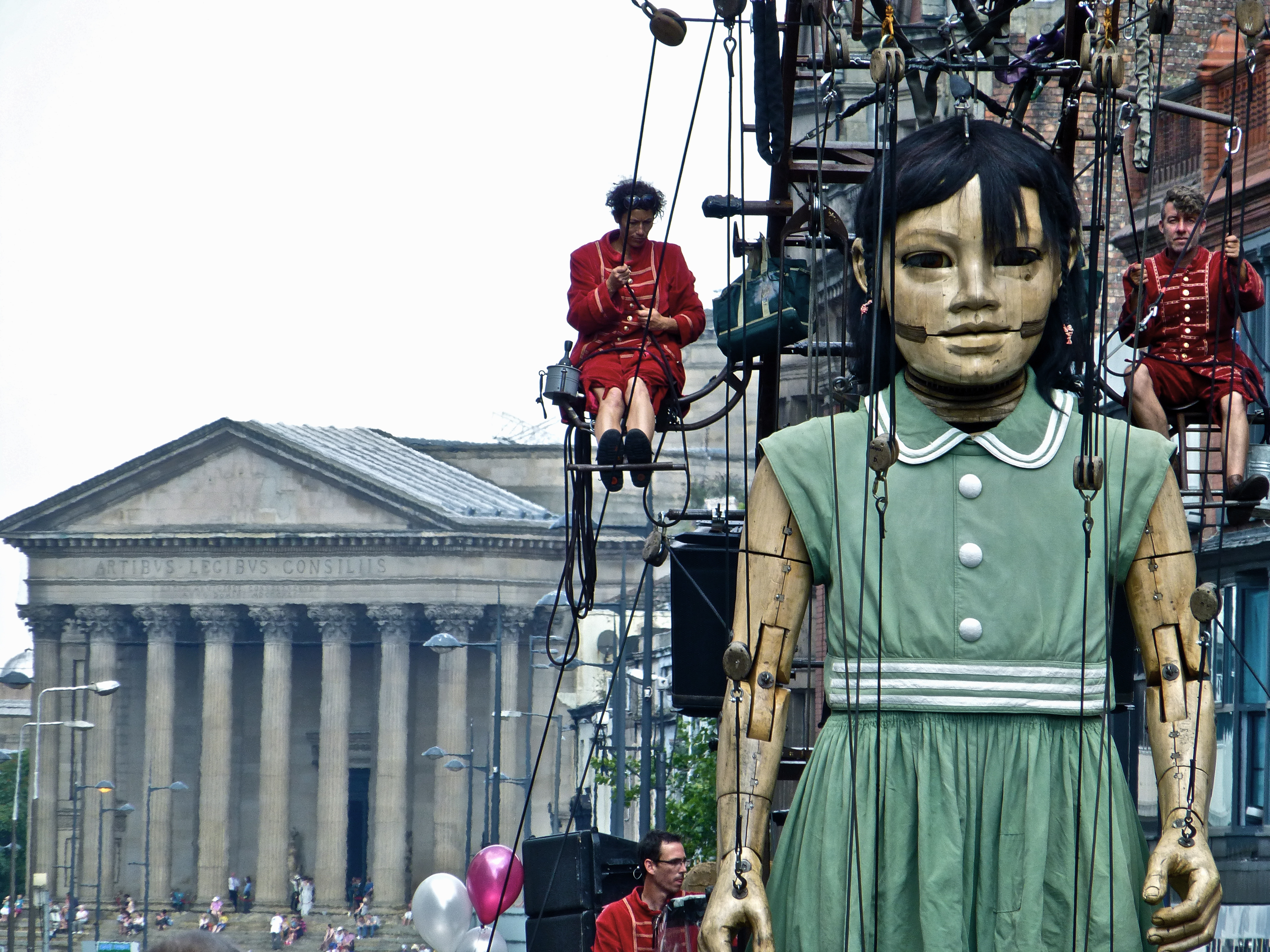
Little Girl Giant at St George's Hall

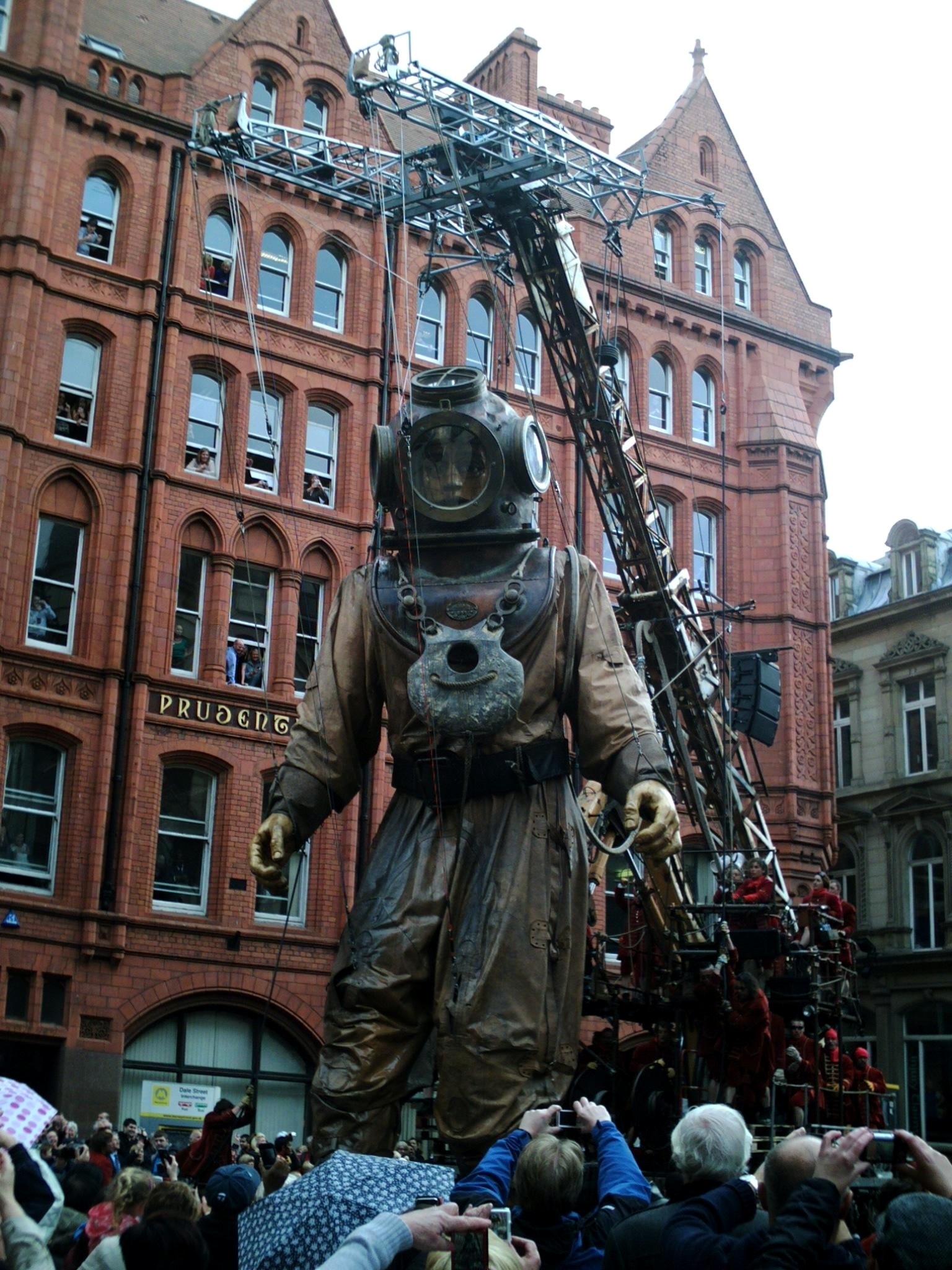
The Giant Uncle on Dale Street

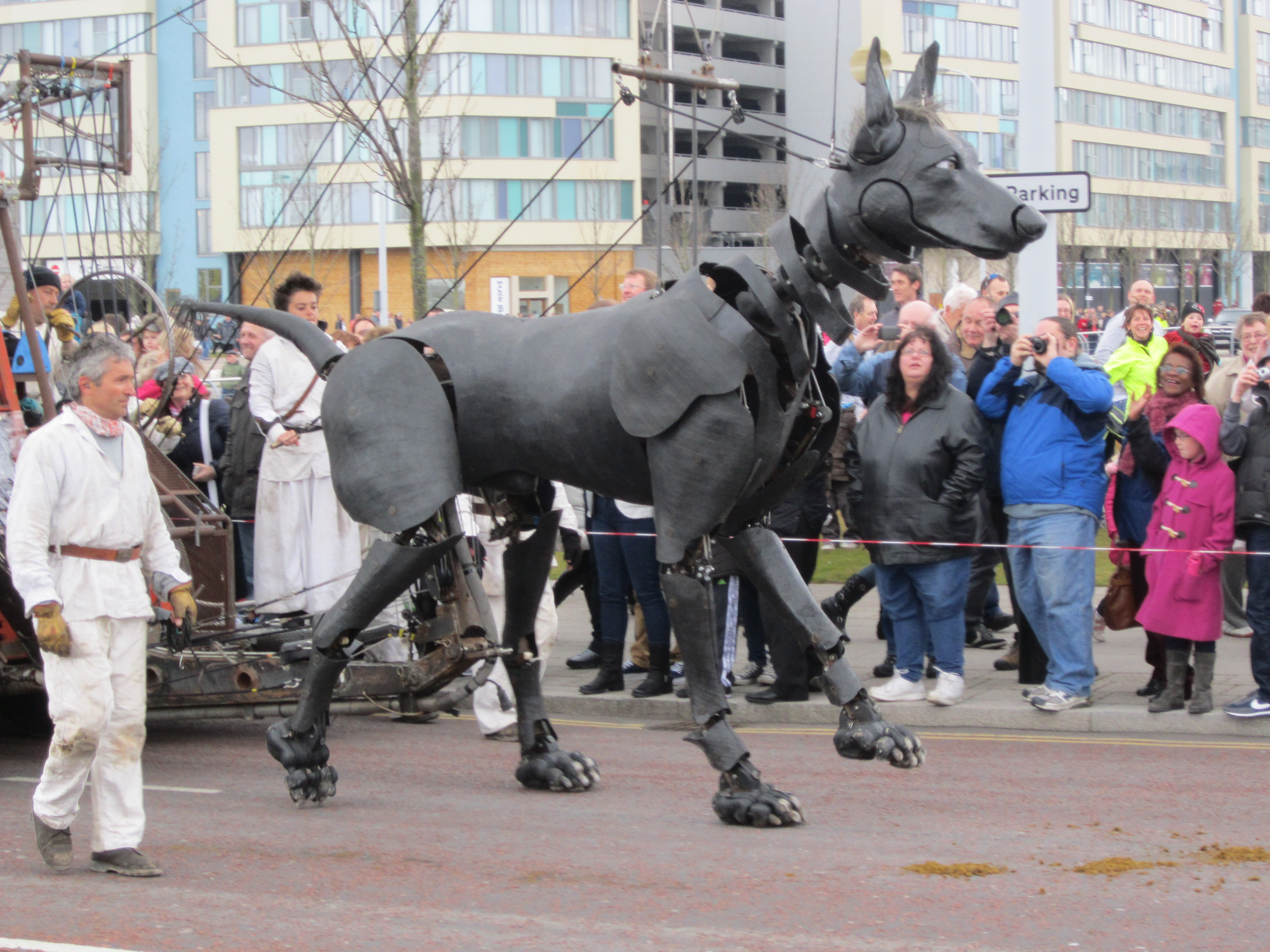
Xolo the dog, out for a walk

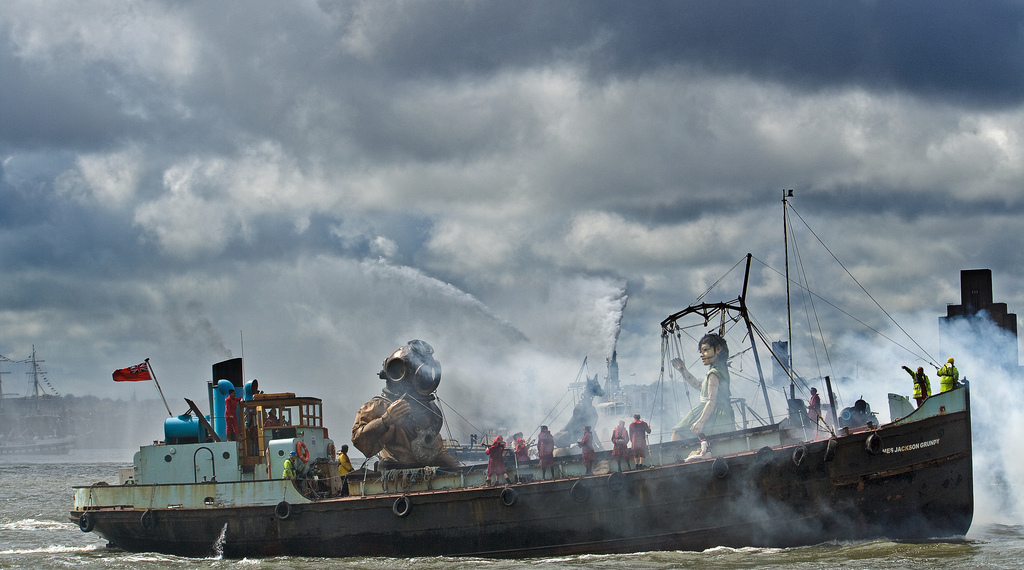
All three giants leaving Liverpool aboard a boat

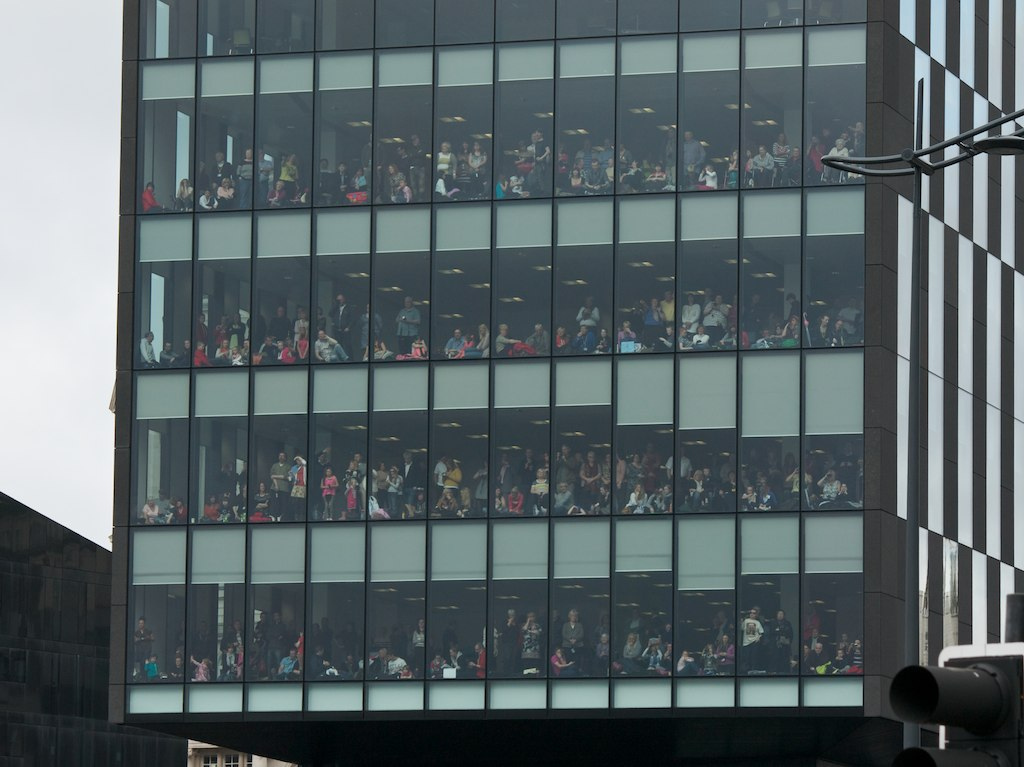
Spectators inside Mann Island Buildings

Sea Odyssey: Giant Spectacular was a three-day outdoor performance art event featuring giant marionettes, that took place in Liverpool, England, from 20 to 22 April 2012.

It was designed and operated by French street theatre company Royal de Luxe, and featured three giants, the 9-metre (30-foot) tall Little Giant Girl, the 15-metre (50-foot) tall Giant Uncle, and the girl's dog, Xolo.

It was estimated that, over the course of the three days, 600,000 people watched the event whilst Liverpool City Council recorded a footfall in the main shopping district of 900,000.

An independent report into the impact of Sea Odyssey concluded it was the most successful event in Liverpool's history. The report showed that 800,000 people took part in the event, which resulted in an economic impact of £32 million.

== Event ==
The event, staged to commemorate the 100th anniversary of the sinking of the RMS Titanic, was inspired by a letter written by a 10-year-old girl, May McMurray, in 1912 to her father William, a bedroom steward on the Titanic who did not survive the sinking. The letter did not arrive until after the Titanic sailed, and was returned to the sender and is now on display at Liverpool's Maritime Museum.

The cost of the event, estimated at £1.5m, was partly met by European legacy funding from Liverpool's 2008 Capital of Culture year. Early forecasts suggested it resulted in a £12 million boost to the city's economy.

With initial expectations of around 250,000 people attending, immediately after the event it was estimated that 600,000 people watched the event over the three days.

The show was led by Royal de Luxe's artistic director, Jean-Luc Courcoult, who celebrated its conclusion by jumping into the River Mersey.

== Story ==
The story, written by Jean-Luc Courcoult, envisages the girl's uncle, a diver, searching the wreck of the Titanic, and having found his brother's letter, coming ashore to bring it and the news of the ship's fate to his niece.

Rising from the water at Liverpool's Salthouse Dock, the giant uncle wanders around the city in search of the girl, who simultaneously awakes in the city's Stanley Park and, accompanied by her dog Xolo, sets out to look for her uncle.

The two miss each other several times, finally meeting up at the King's Dock at the end of the second day of the event. The following day, the pair set out together for a final walk around the city centre, and then board a boat at Canning Dock and leave Liverpool via the River Mersey.

Between them, by the end of the three days, the giants covered a distance of 23 miles (37 km), taking in the areas around the football grounds of Liverpool F.C. and Everton F.C., the city centre, Pier Head, Chinatown, and the Albert Dock and King's Dock complexes.

== Giants ==
The giants taking part in the event comprised the Little Giant Girl, measuring 9 metres (30 feet), the Giant Uncle, measuring 15 metres (50 feet), and the girl's dog, Xolo. The girl and the uncle are constructed from poplar wood, lime wood and steel, and have eyes made from street lights and hair made from horse hair. The dog, Xolo, is made from papier-mâché and steel. All three are controlled using ropes, pulleys and motors.

During the three days, the puppets, cranes, and other equipment required a team of 110 operators, who call themselves Lilliputians after the characters from the 1726 Jonathan Swift novel Gulliver's Travels. A total of 20 cranes were required to move them around the city. The uncle requires 31 people to control, with the girl operated by a team of 24 puppeteers, and the dog a team of 21.

During the tour the giants were accompanied by a group of live musicians, and used a number of props, including the girl's boat, on which she sailed for part of her journey, her scooter, deck chair, bed, and radio.

== See also ==
- La Princesse, a 15-metre (50-foot) mechanical spider that roamed around Liverpool in 2008
- The Sultan's Elephant, an event performed by Royal de Luxe in London in 2006, and in other cities
- Memories of August 1914, a later event in Liverpool with the same giant marionettes
