= Lumiere (festival) =

British light festival

Lumiere festival
- Status: active
- Genre: light art
- Frequency: Biennially in Durham, Occasional elsewhere
- Locations: Durham and touring
- Country: United Kingdom
- Years active: 2009–2025
- Established: Durham, November 2009
- Most recent: Durham, November 2025
- Organiser: Artichoke
- Website: www.lumiere-festival.com

Lumiere is the UK's largest light festival. The festival, produced by London-based creative company Artichoke, debuted in Durham in 2009. The festival was part inspired by the Fête des lumières in Lyon. Hosted in winter time, and free to attend, the festival typically comprises a number of light art-installations, as well as illuminating iconic buildings and locations. The festival takes place biennially in November in Durham, and since 2013 has occasionally toured to other locations, both reusing popular illuminations from Durham and creating new bespoke installations. In October 2025 it was announced by Artichoke that Lumiere 2025 would be the final iteration of festival, ending the popular illuminations after 16 years.

== Durham ==
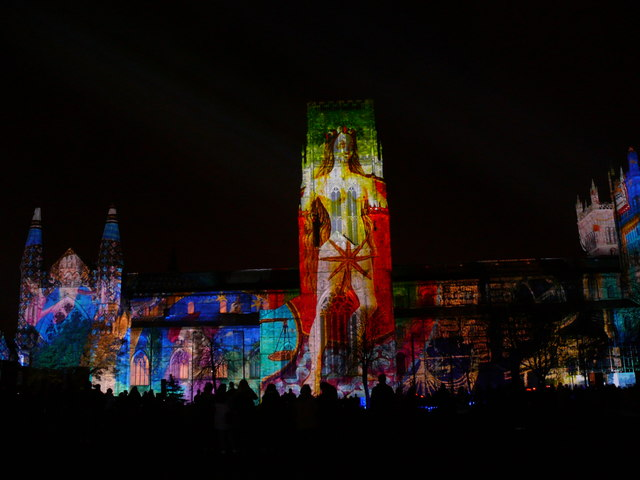
The projection display on Durham Cathedral during the 2015 Lumiere festival

The first Lumiere festival took place in Durham in 2009 and has been recommissioned by Durham County Council every two years since then. 75,000 people attended the four-day event in 2009, the central exhibit of which was Durham Cathedral illuminated with projected images from the Lindisfarne Gospels. The festival returned to Durham in 2011 at a significantly larger size, attracting more than 150,000 visitors and generating £4.3 million for the local economy. A further event was held in 2013 with crowds of 175,000 and highlights including a 3D projection of a walking elephant installed over the Elvet Bridge. The festival returned to Durham for the fifth time in November 2017, returned for its 10-year anniversary in November 2019, and then again in 2021 for the sixth festival. For the first time in its history, artworks were spread across Durham County, rather than being concentrated in Durham City Centre.

In October 2025, Durham County Council, now led by Reform UK following the May local elections, announced that the 2025 edition of Lumiere would be the “last of the current format”. The decision was framed as part of a wider cost-cutting and funding review, citing escalating event costs and the need for a “reset” of the festival going forward. While the announcement emphasised that a future “refreshed and revitalised” event could return if a sustainable funding strategy is found, the festival’s long-running biennial programme in Durham has effectively ended under the current arrangement.

== Elsewhere ==
=== Derry ===
In 2013, the light show was taken to Derry in Northern Ireland where almost 180,000 people visited 17 separate art installations around the city, including illuminated sculptures placed around the Peace Bridge and projections on Austins department store. For the four nights of the festival, a fire garden was held at St Columb's Park.

=== London ===
In January 2016, the festival was brought to London for the first time, with light installations sited around Piccadilly, Grosvenor Square, and King's Cross. The front of Westminster Abbey was illuminated with coloured light projected onto statues by artist Patrice Warrener. 3-metre-high (9.8 ft) neon letters from the top of the Centre Point building were temporarily set up in Trafalgar Square, and in Leicester Square a 'Garden of Light' was created by French artists TILT, centred around the statue of William Shakespeare.

On Saturday, some installations had to be temporarily switched off and King's Cross station was evacuated due to overcrowding caused by the festival.

In January 2018, the festival returned for its second London edition. For four days, over 50 works of art were on public display in King's Cross, Fitzrovia, Mayfair, West End, Westminster, Victoria, South Bank, and Waterloo.

== List of festivals ==
Year	City
2009	Durham
2011	Durham
2013	Durham / Derry
2015	Durham
2016	London
2017	Durham
2018	London
2019	Durham
2021	Durham
2023	Durham
2025	Durham

== Gallery ==
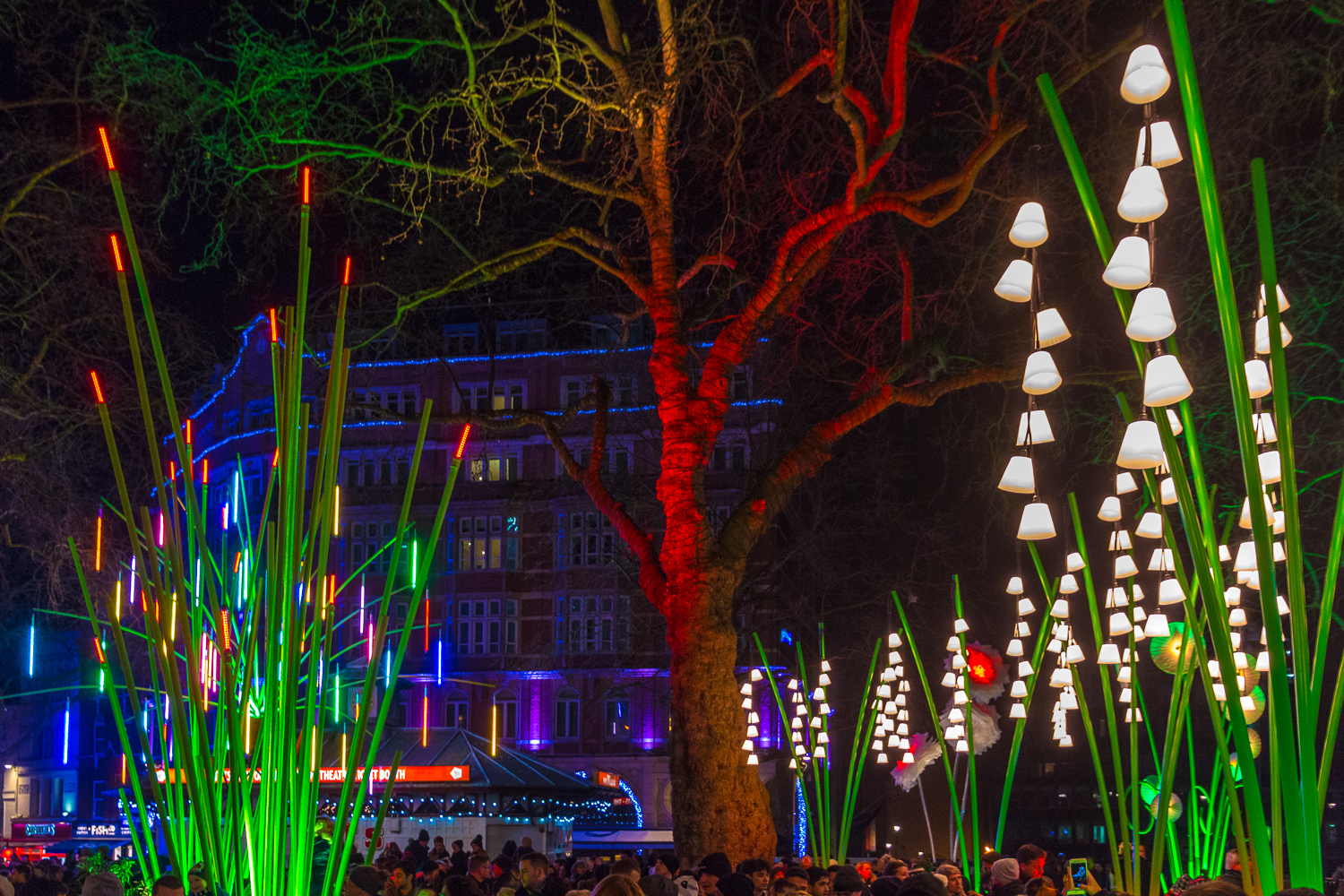
Light sculptures transform Leicester Square in London.

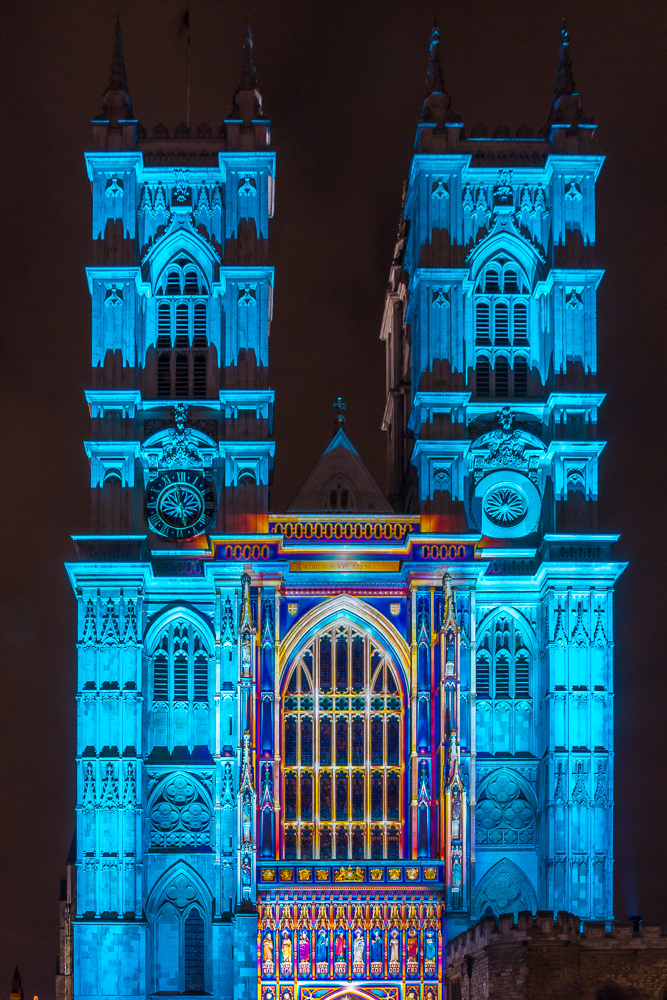
Coloured light projected onto Westminster Abbey by artist Patrice Warrener.

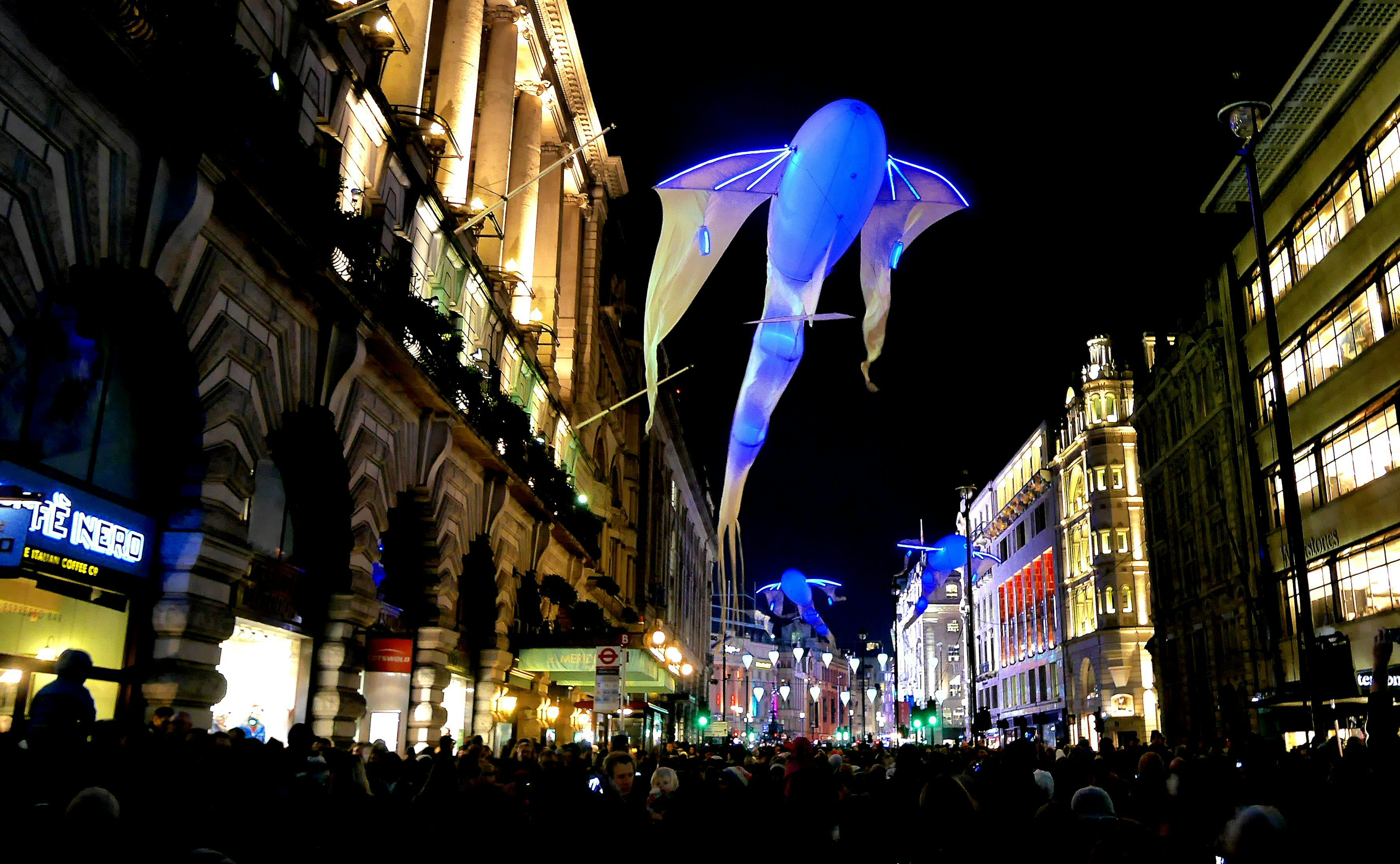
Luminéoles by Porté par le vent fly along Piccadilly London.

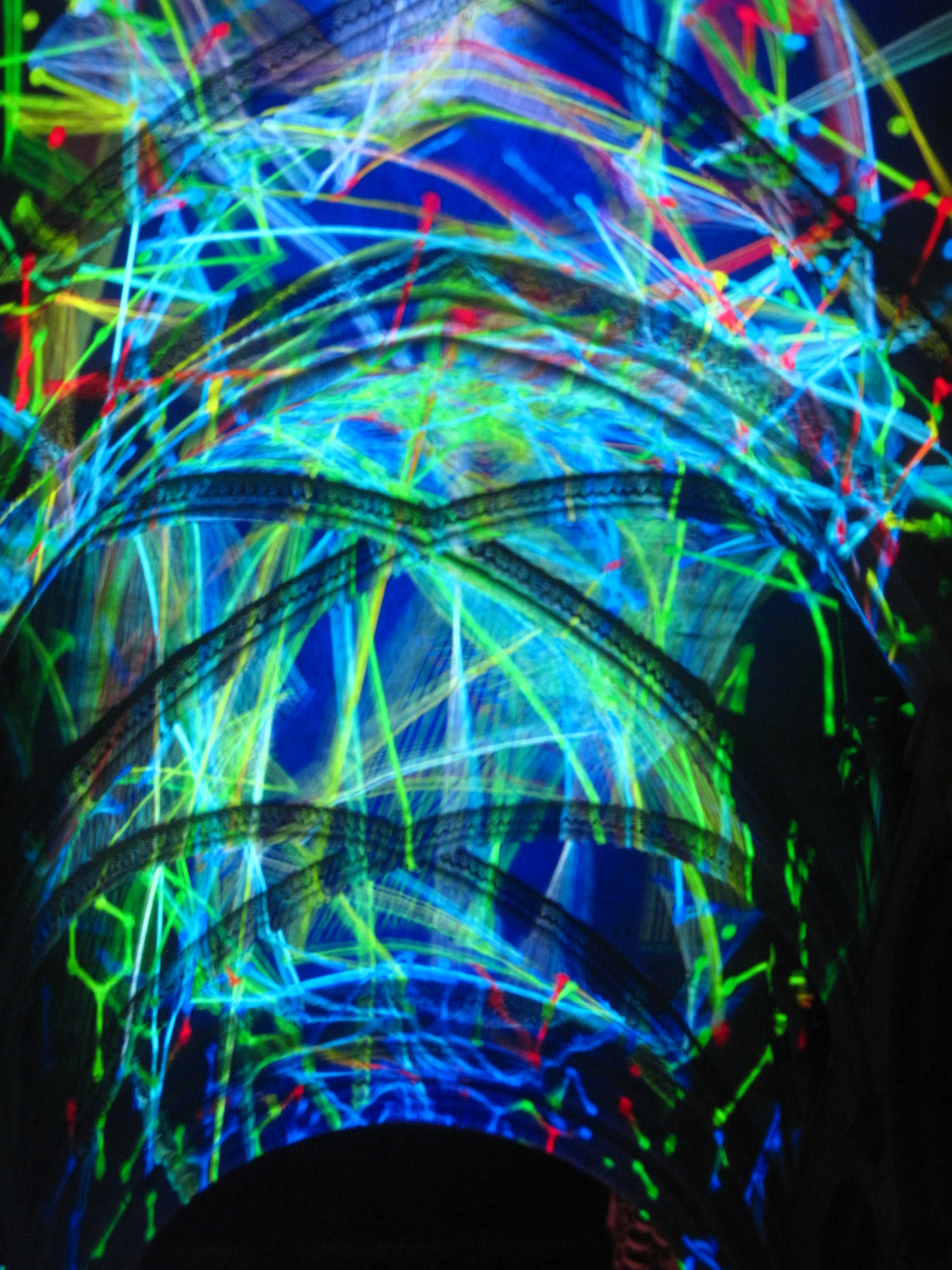
Complex Meshes: A light projection on the ribbed vault ceiling of Durham Cathedral by artist Miguel Chevalier.
