= Memories of August 1914 =

Performance art event

Memories of August 1914 was a five-day outdoor performance art event featuring giant marionettes, and took place in Liverpool, England, from 23 to 27 July 2014. The event started with the sleeping Grandmother on display in St George's Hall. On the Friday, approximately 300,000 people watched the giants in the city. On the final day, the giants left the city in a boat on the River Mersey, after making their way from Clarence Dock via The Strand. Crowd estimates show that over the course of the weekend, more than 1.5 million people attended the event.

It was designed and operated by the French street theatre company Royal de Luxe, and featured two of the three giants, the Little Giant Girl and her dog, Xolo, that were used in the Sea Odyssey: Giant Spectacular in 2012. The event is to mark 100 years since the start of World War I.

== See also ==
- La Princesse, a 15-metre (50-foot) mechanical spider that roamed around Liverpool in 2008
- The Sultan's Elephant, an event performed by Royal de Luxe in London in 2006, and in other cities
