= François Delarozière =

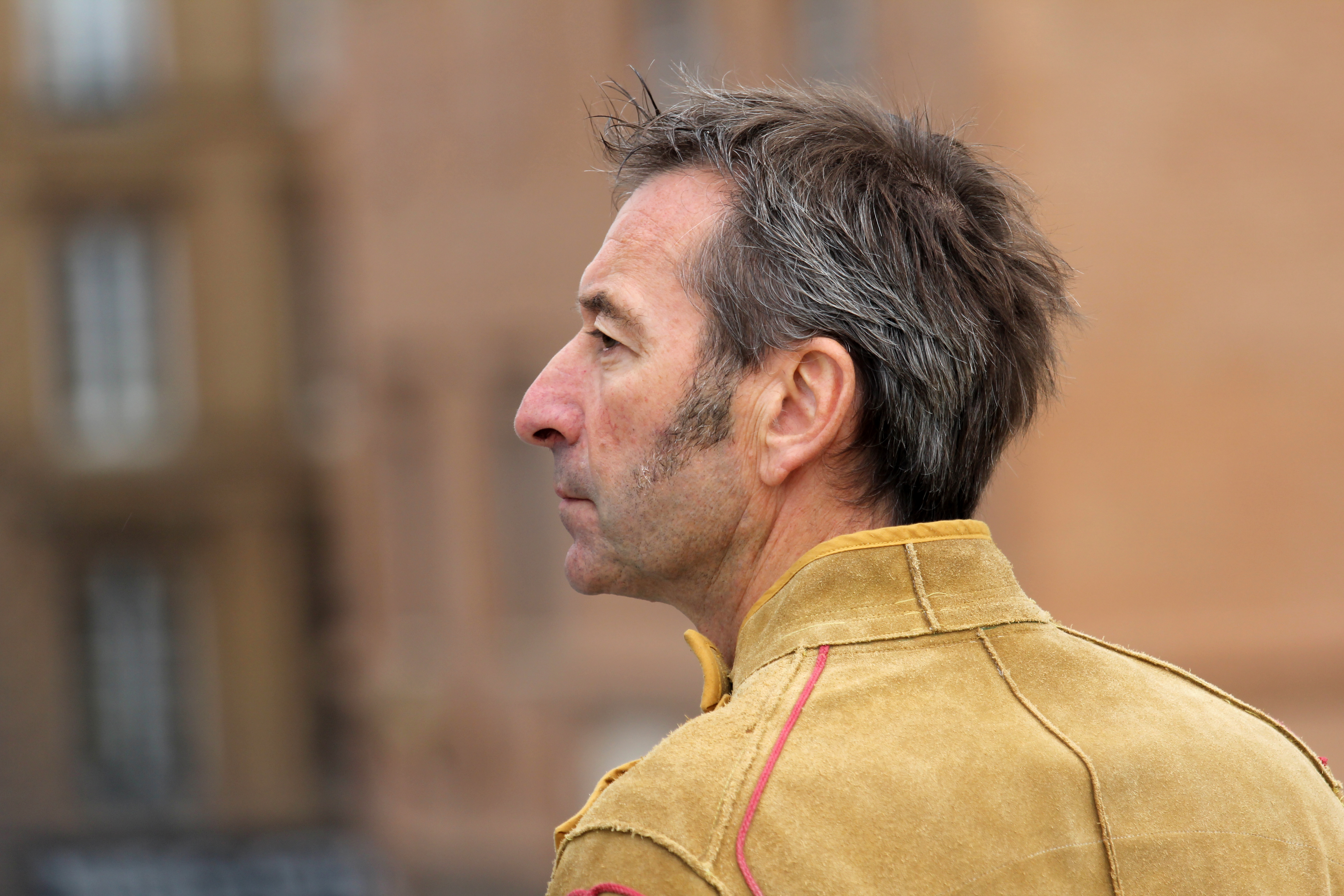
on the Pont Neuf in Toulouse

François Delarozière (born 1963) is the art director of La Machine, a French company which is a collaboration between artists, designers, fabricators and technicians and which specialises in producing giant performing machines, often creatures. He has collaborated with French and international companies in productions ranging from traditional theatre to experimental street art.

== Life and work ==
Delarozière was born in 1963 in Marseille and studied there at the École des Beaux Arts. He has worked in theatrical-based productions for over 20 years, first designing theatre sets and interiors. In 1987 he met Jean-Luc Courcoult, the artistic director of the French street theatre company Royal de Luxe and over a period of years, from 1991 to 2008, Delarozière, Courcoult and their engineers designed and created a host of huge performing creatures, which toured various European cities. These included giraffes, rhinos, a giant Gulliver, and The Sultan's Elephant.

In 2008 Delarozière severed his 21-year collaboration with Royal de Luxe to focus on his own company, La Machine. La Princesse, the giant mechanical spider that visited Liverpool in September of that year, is the first in a series of six planned creatures that will debut around the world.

All his pieces start with hand-drawn blueprints, described as "think Jules Verne via Leonardo and Heath Robinson", and his trademark materials are unpainted wood and metal, with the workings exposed.

He described his influences as

Leonardo da Vinci, Jules Verne, Gustave Eiffel, Antonio Gaudi, surrealism, dadaism but also everyday architecture, bridges, shipyards, railway bridges or my training in fine art. My father was a cabinet-maker, but he also built houses; that's how I came to brickwork, to plumbing, welding and mechanics. But I think what inspires me most is a study of nature; before I invent, I observe life.

Delarozière has been described as an "engineering genius", and Radio France said of him

He creates machines, machines which are both beautiful and crazy, giant animals, strange contraptions which play music, boats which sail across the land, birds from where you can have a drink in a daydream, a world which is both real and dreamlike and which invades cities for beautiful, moving and crazy celebrations.
