= Jean Blaise =

French artistic director (born 1951)

- Born: 1951 (age 74–75)
- Occupation: French artistic director

Jean Blaise (French pronunciation: [ʒɑ̃ blɛz]; born 1951) is a French artistic director for special events.

Blaise was born in 1951 in Algiers. His family left Algeria for the Parisian suburbs and settled in Ris-Orangis.

In 1976 he received his Licencié en lettres and became head of a cultural center in the Bordeaux region, then another in Seine-et-Marne, and a third in 1980, in Guadeloupe.

In 1982–1983, he founded the Centre de recherche pour le développement culturel, or Research Center for Cultural Development, in Nantes.

In 1990, he created the festival Les Allumées in Nantes.

In 1997 the festival Fin de Siècle took the baton from Les Allumées.

In 2000, he created Le Lieu unique in Nantes.

In 2002, he became the artistic director of the first Nuit Blanche, in Paris.

In 2007 he organized the cultural event Estuaire 2007.
