= La Princesse =

Robotic mechanical spider

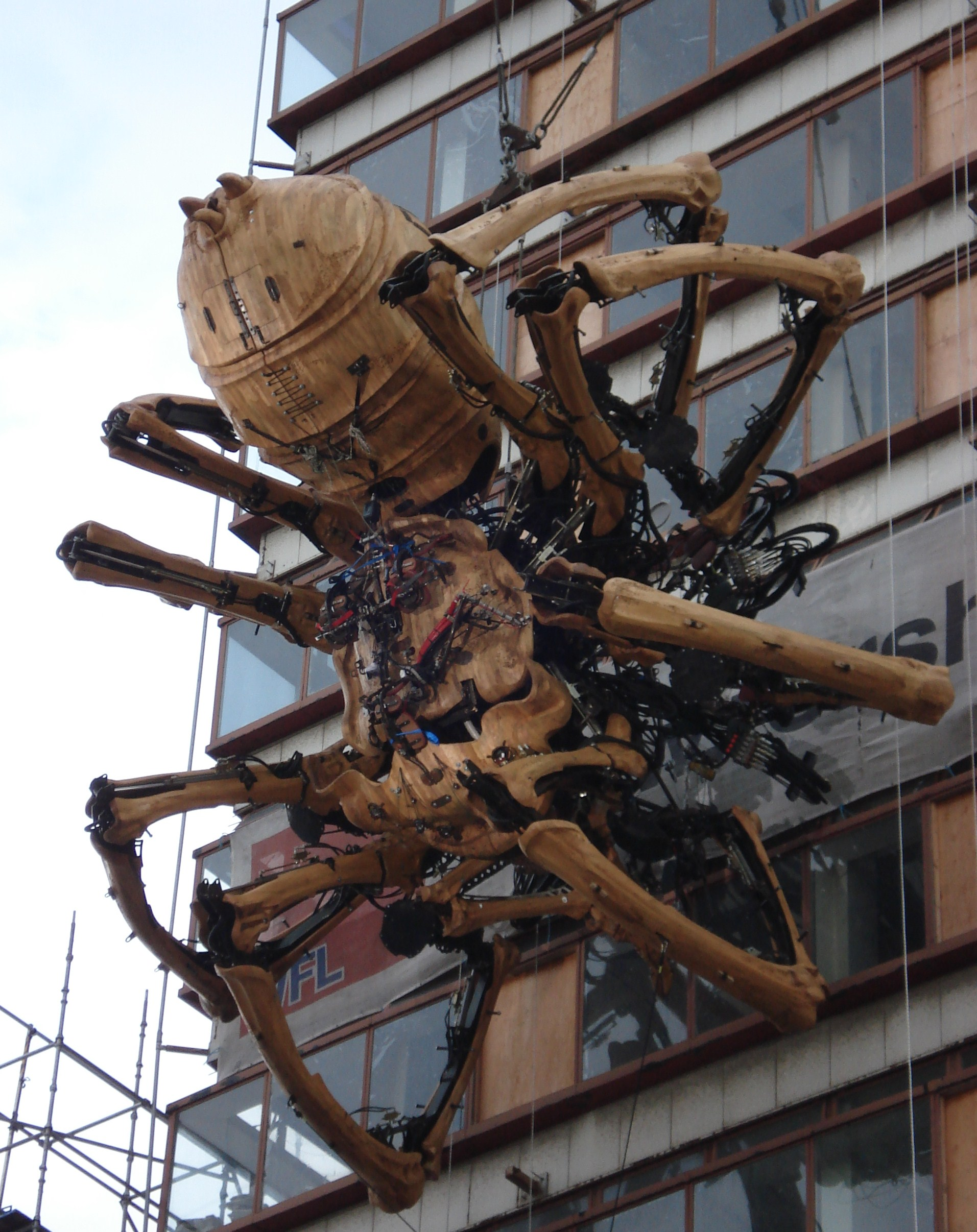
La Princesse as it first appeared at Concourse House.

La Princesse is a 15-metre (50-foot) mechanical spider designed and operated by French performance art company La Machine. The spider was showcased in Liverpool, England, as part of the 2008 European Capital of Culture celebrations, travelling around the city between 3–7 September. In 2009, it was on display in Yokohama, Japan, as part of Yokohama's 150th anniversary of its port opening. Arts reviewer Lyn Gardner wrote in The Guardian "There were times when it seemed to be leading the entire population of the city on a merry dance, like some kind of arachnid pied piper."

== Design ==
A performer on a leg of La Princesse in Lord Street, Liverpool

The spider was designed by La Machine's François Delarozière, who also designed the mechanical elephant and the giant girl for Royal de Luxe's performance of The Sultan's Elephant which visited London in May 2006. Both projects were brought to the UK by the company and charitable trust Artichoke. The spider was built in Nantes in France, using steel and poplar wood and complex hydraulics, and took an entire year to construct. It was shipped to Merseyside and assembled in a secret location, the Cammell Laird shipyard in Birkenhead. It weighs 37 tonnes, has 50 axes of movement and is operated by up to 12 people strapped to its body. When operated, it moves at 2 miles per hour; to move it around the streets requires 16 cranes, six forklift trucks, eight cherry pickers and 250 crew.

== Performance and narrative ==
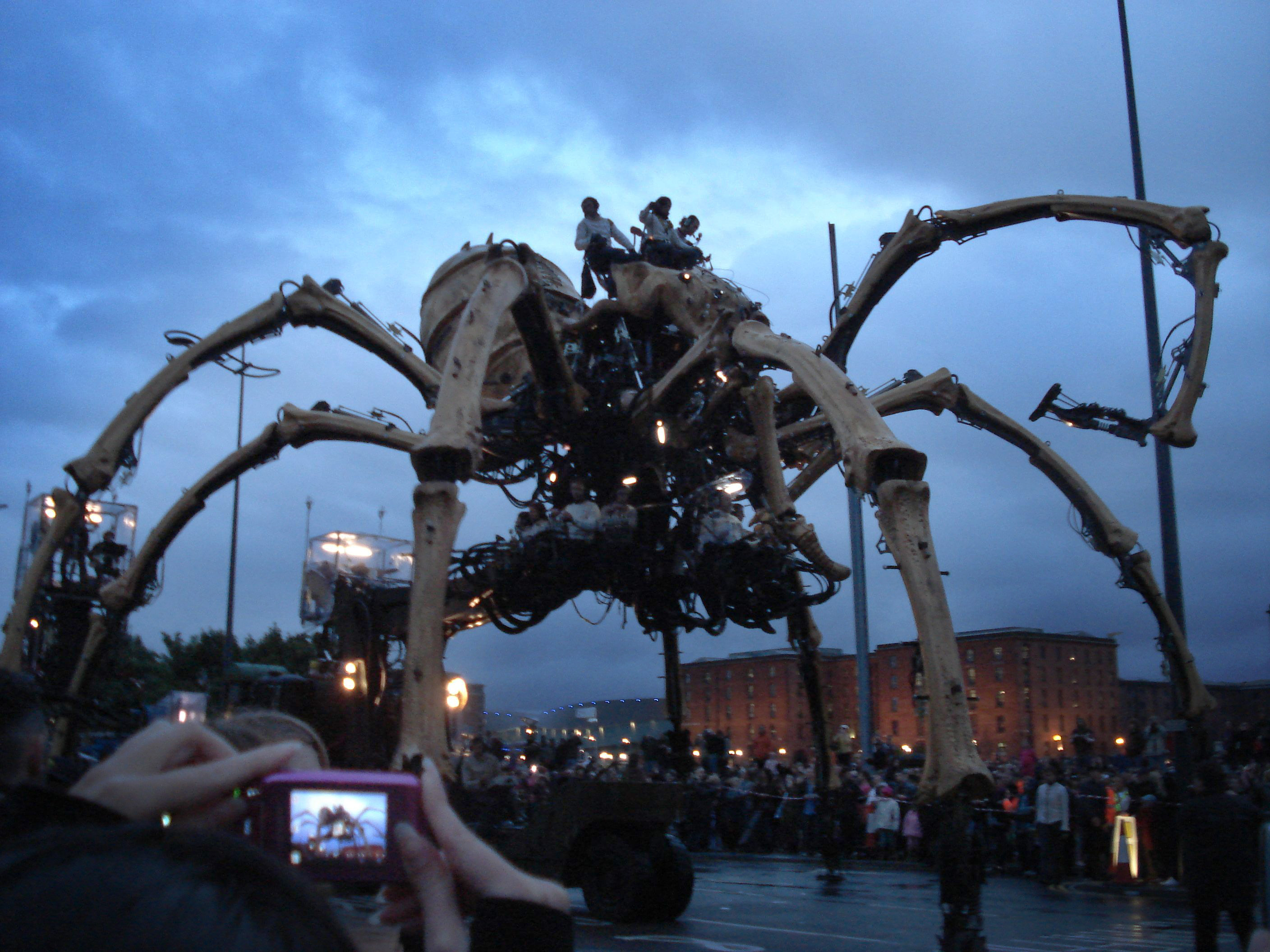
La Princesse moving through the streets of Liverpool

The performance artists of La Machine created a story about the spider with one member of the company playing scientist Joseph Browning who gave interviews to the press. The spider was followed by a full live band, housed in their own platforms on top of forklift trucks and cherry pickers. The musicians played specially composed music by Dominique Malan, the special effects were designed by Thierry Loridant and the costumes were designed by Gaelle Choveau.

=== First appearance ===
On 3 September 2008, the spider appeared for the first time on the side of Concourse House, a derelict tower block in Lime Street, which had been designed by architect Richard Seifert and was scheduled for demolition.

=== 'The journey begins' ===
On the morning of 5 September, the spider moved to the Albert Dock, and it became active at lunchtime, moving in a small area and spraying the public with water. In the evening the spider travelled from the Albert Dock to the Cunard Building, via Salthouse Dock. A huge crowd turned out despite the heavy rain. The performance moved around the Albert Dock and proceeded onto The Strand. The moving cordon of stewards surrounded the spider as it moved through the crowd. The spider sprayed water onto the crowds and interacted with members of the public. It then turned off the Strand and back into the Albert Dock. Here, it paused and was lifted from its traction body by a huge crane and into Salthouse Dock, where it was sprayed (along with the crowd) by huge water cannons. After its 'bath', it returned to its traction body and walked along The Strand to its resting place for the night next to the Royal Liver Building.

=== 'City centre rampage' ===
On 6 September, the spider was due to travel through the streets of Liverpool, 'walking' from the Cunard Building via Water Street, Castle St, Lord St, Parker St and Ranelagh Place back up to Concourse House. At 2:30 pm, the Performance started with the spider ‘awakening’ and starting to walk up Water Street towards the city centre. Liverpool was crowded with its usual Saturday afternoon shopping crowd and the tens of thousands who had turned out to see the spider. The spider ‘walked’ through the middle of the Saturday shopping crowd, up through the city centre's streets, and right into the heart of the city's shopping district. The crowd was dispersed by the moving cordon around the spider. Local media reported that the scene was more representative of a victory parade of a football team or the crowds attracted by the Beatles to the city centre in their heyday. One bride could not get through the crowds to her wedding at the Town Hall and had to be helped through the crowd on foot by the police. The spider's musicians played an impromptu wedding march as they fought through the crowd. Various set pieces took place along the spider's route, involving smoke, fireworks and water cannon. The spider worked its way towards the main shopping area, passing Liverpool One. When the spider reached the centre of Lord Street, it was covered by a snow shower from above to make it go to sleep. It came to a rest at around 5 pm, taking a break before its further exploits that evening.

=== 'The city fights back' ===
The next chapter of the story continued the same day and involved the city ‘fighting back’ and attempting to halt the path of the invading spider. At 7:30 pm the spider ‘awoke’ and continued to move up the main shopping street, Church Street. When it reached the top of the street, it was met by a barrage of flame cannons. These consisted of long copper pipes, fired with high pressure gas. The heat and noise produced by this halted the spider in its tracks, while a mechanical digger moved in to attempt to fell the beast. The spider then changed its path to escape this and moved upwards towards Lime Street. Upon reaching Lime Street the spider was met by huge fans, which blew air to attempt to hold it back. The performance continued onwards towards Lime Street Station and the empty Concourse Tower, where it had first been sighted on Wednesday. A further barrage of flames stopped the spider from moving on any further and it turned towards the station. Cranes then moved in to lift it from its traction body, and with the operators still on board, it started to move into a vertical position. The spider then moved from one crane to another and amazingly attached itself to the side of the tower. A snow shower then engulfed the spider and it went to sleep for the evening.

=== 'The creature departs' ===
On 7 September, a large crowd of spectators went to the Concourse House to see it climb back down the building. The spider then crawled down the streets of Liverpool city centre, spraying the crowd with water. The spider then moved across St Georges Plateau amongst a huge crowd and down towards the Queensway Tunnel. Fireworks erupted from surrounding buildings as it passed. Watched by tens of thousands of people, it investigated the area outside the Queensway Tunnel's entrance, setting off huge water cannons and flames around the area, followed by hundreds of fireworks which detonated above the spider and the public. The spider then turned to face the crowd and moved backwards as it disappeared in a cloud of smoke into the tunnel entrance.

== Cost ==
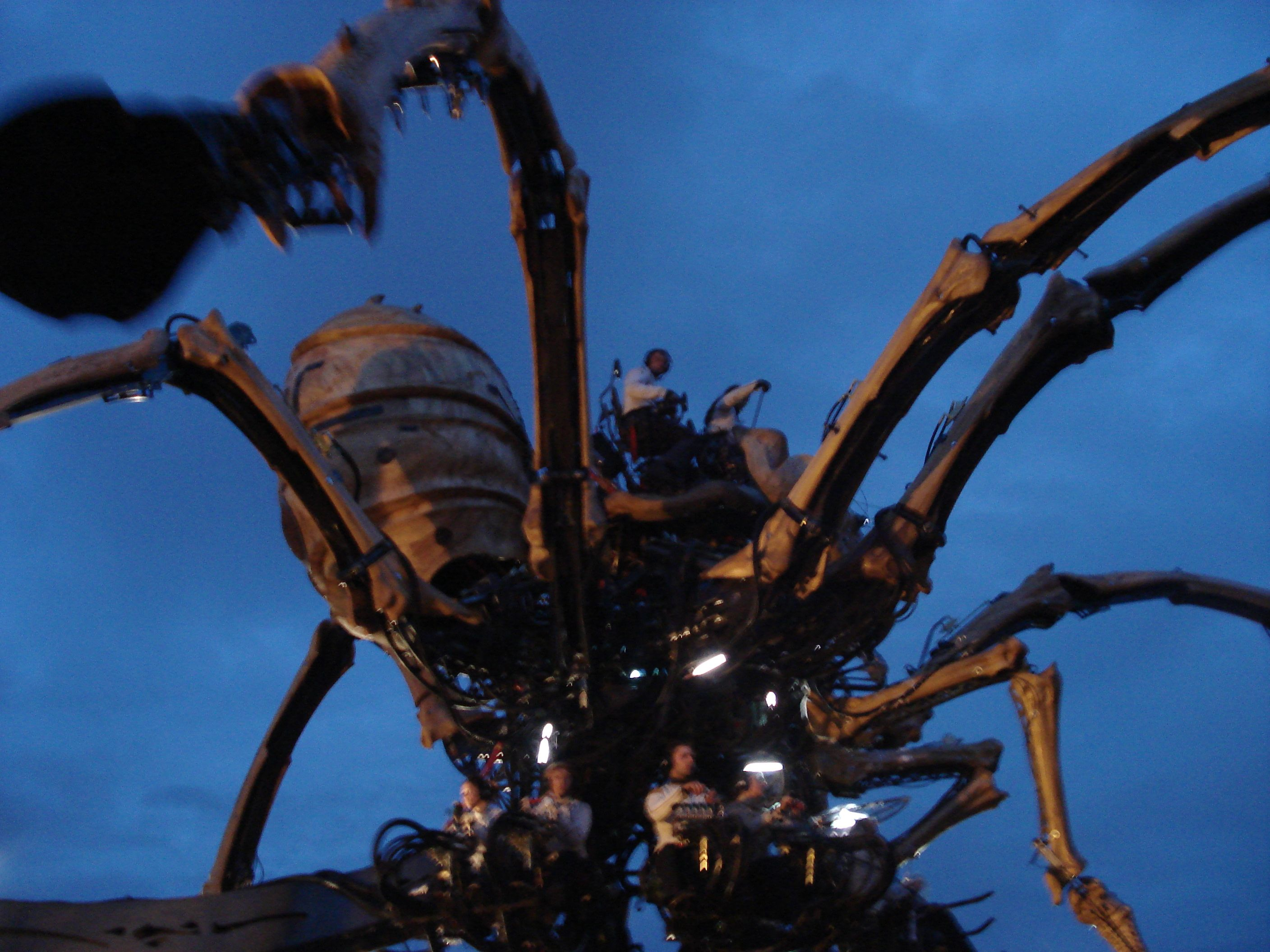
Showing the puppeteers: three ride on top of the spider and nine under her body, one to operate each leg and one for other operations

The project, which was free to the public, cost between £1.8 and £1.9 million to stage, of which £1.5 million came from the Liverpool Culture Company (in turn funded by the city, the Arts Council and the Department of Culture, Media and Sport). The cost of the project has been defended by Phil Redmond, who is responsible for the performance as Liverpool Culture Company's artistic director. He said "At £1.5m I think it's actually cheaper than (booking) Macca (Sir Paul McCartney) and it has got us on the front of the South China Morning Post. So it's good value for money." However, the project has come in for criticism in some quarters: the UK mental health charity Anxiety has highlighted the potentially traumatic effect of the production upon those suffering with arachnophobia. The vast majority of the public response was positive, however, with most of the belief that "The Liverpool Princesse's" performance was the highlight of the city's Capital of Culture 2008 celebrations. On 8 September, BBC North West Tonight, a regional news programme, revealed that plans were afoot to secure La Princesse to stay permanently in Liverpool, and talks had already been held with La Machine.

Although the event was free to the public, there has been a shortfall of between £300,000 and £400,000 in funding for the project, exacerbated by the falling exchange rate with the Euro, the currency in which the French participants are paid. Artichoke has appealed for donations to help fund the project.

La Princesse walking down Lord Street, Liverpool, 2008

== See also ==
- Sea Odyssey: Giant Spectacular, an event held in Liverpool in 2012
- Memories of August 1914, an event held in Liverpool in 2014
- Cultural depictions of spiders
