= La Machine (production company) =

Production company

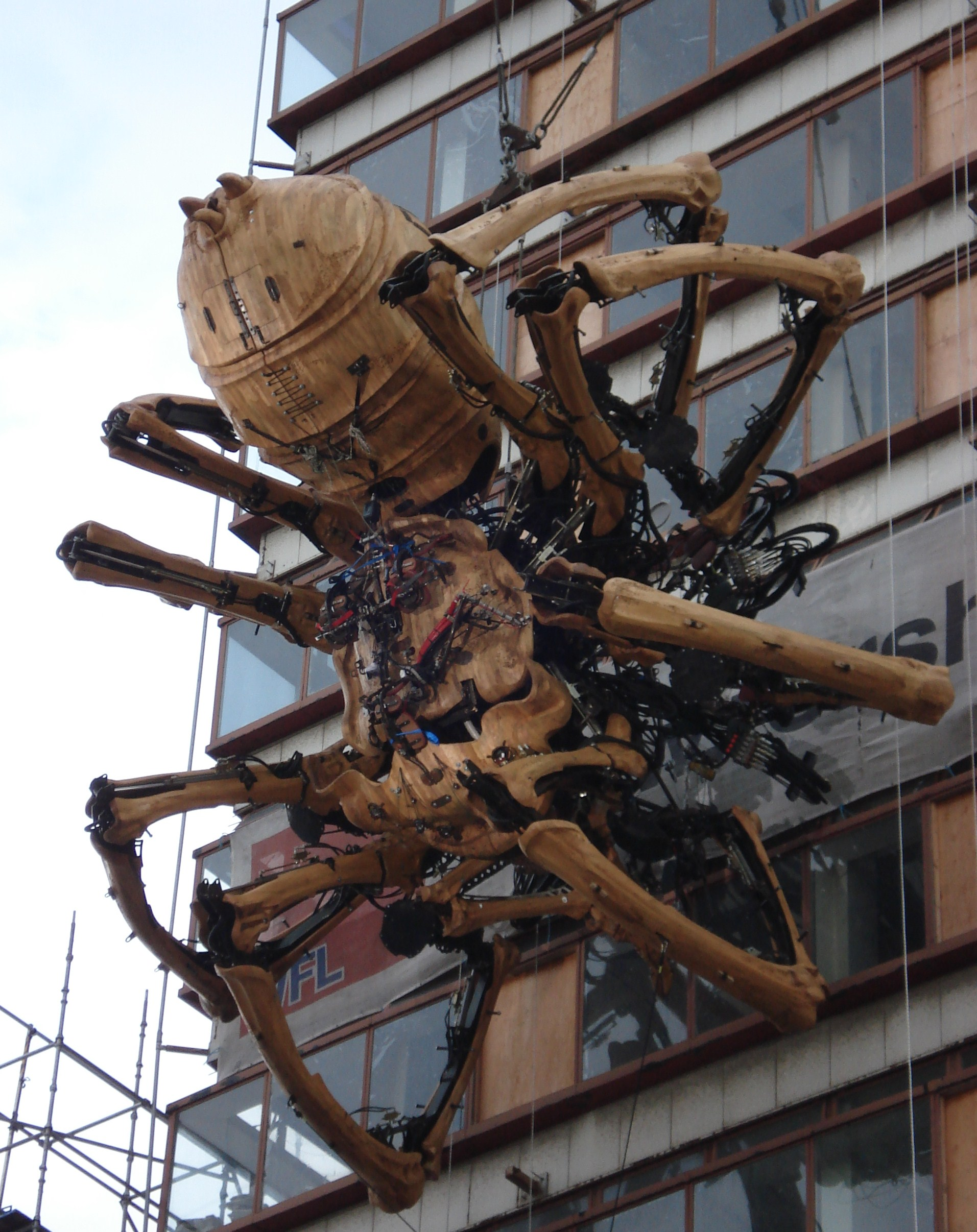
La Princesse as it first appeared at Concourse House.

La Machine is a French production company based in Nantes, France, which is famous for La Princesse, a 50-foot mechanical spider constructed in Nantes, France.

== Background ==
The group was formed by artists, designers, fabricators and technicians in early 1990s and is currently led by François Delarozière, Artistic Director and creator of La Princesse. It is known for its theatrical machines, permanent installations, and also its own theatrical productions.

== Past productions ==
=== 1999 ===
==== Le Manège d'Andrea ====
Le Manège d'Andrea is an art carousel made of steel, wood, and copper. Instead of horses, the merry-go-round has non-traditional animals including a stag beetle, a blowfish, and a sea monster, as well as objects such as an ocean liner and a biplane.

=== 2003 ===
==== Symphonie Mécanique ====
A classical live performance in collaboration with industrial machines. Scores were composed by Dominique Malan.

==== Le Grand Répertoire ====
Exhibition of machines created to be shown in public places. Has visited Nantes, Calais, Antwerp, Toulouse, and Marseille, as well as Paris in 2006, where it was seen by over 50,000 people.

=== 2007 ===
==== Les Machines de l'Île ====
Les Machines de l'Île or Machines of the Isle of Nantes is a gallery containing Le Grand Éléphant, as well as other creations by La Machine, which the public can visit. It is at the edge of the river Loire, in an old shipyard. Other productions are expected to appear there, with Le Carrousel du Monde Marins, a merry-go-round, opened to the public in 2012 but also La Galerie des Machines, a place where new productions are exposed to be tested by the audience.

=== 2008 ===
==== Le Manège Carré Sénart ====
Le Manège Carré Sénart is a square merry-go-round, which showed off insects and buffalo, and appeared just outside Paris. It is scheduled to visit Madrid in late 2008, and St Petersburg in 2009.

==== La Princesse ====
A 60-foot mechanical spider named La Princesse was installed in Liverpool in early September 2008, as part of the city's European Capital of Culture 2008 celebrations. It was operated by 12 people controlling the 8 legs and other movements of the spider. It was toured around city landmarks such as St George's Hall and the Albert Dock, and was seen walking down streets and climbing onto the side of a derelict tower block at the end of each performance. The performance was seen by Liverpool residents and tourists estimated at estimated 150,000 over the weekend, despite the poor weather, and attracted worldwide media attention to the city. The show's £1.8 million price tag was criticised by some.

== See also ==
- Royal de Luxe - a similar French mechanical marionette street theatre company
