= Royal de Luxe =

Street theatre company

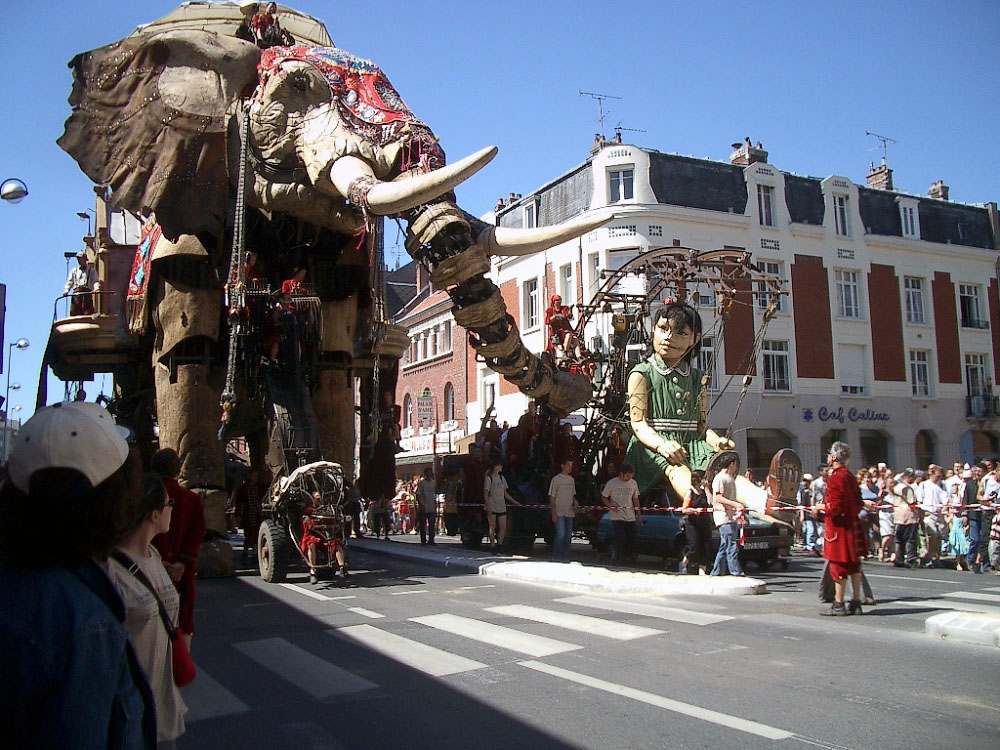
Royal de Luxe, Amiens from 2005

Royal de Luxe is a French mechanical marionette street theatre company which specialises in giant puppets. They were founded in 1979 in Aix-en-Provence by Jean-Luc Courcoult. After some years based in Toulouse, the company moved to Nantes in 1989. The company has performed in France, Belgium, England, Germany, Iceland, Chile, Australia, Mexico, Canada, Switzerland, the Netherlands and Ireland.

== Giants spectacular ==
| Title | City | Country | Date | Event | Audience size |
|---|---|---|---|---|---|
| The Giant who fell from the sky | Le Havre | France | September 1993 | | |
| The Giant who fell from the sky | Calais | France | June 1994 | Channel Tunnel's opening | |
| The Giant who fell from the sky | Nîmes | France | July 1994 | | |
| The Giant who fell from the sky | Nantes | France | August 1994 | | |
| The Giant who fell from the sky | Bayonne | France | September 1994 | | |
| The Giant who fell from the sky, last voyage | Le Havre | France | October 1994 | | |
| The Giant who fell from the sky in Barcelona | Barcelona | Spain | July 1997 | | |
| Rhinoceros | Arles | France | July 1997 | Arles International Photography Festival | |
| Rhinoceros | Lisbon | Portugal | May 1998 to September 1998 | 1998 Lisbon World Exposition | |
| Return from Africa | Le Havre | France | June 1998 | | |
| Return from Africa | Nantes | France | June 1998 | | |
| Return from Africa | Calais | France | July 1998 | | |
| Return from Africa | Antwerp | Belgium | August 1998 | Zomer van Antwerpen | |
| Giraffes Hunter | Nantes | France | September 2000 | | |
| Giraffes Hunter | Le Havre | France | October 2000 | | |
| Giraffes Hunter | Calais | France | October 2000 | | |
| The Sultan of the Indies visit on his time travelling Elephant | Nantes | France | May 2005 | Jules Verne Death Centenary | 150,000 |
| The Sultan of the Indies visit on his time travelling Elephant | Amiens | France | June 2005 | Jules Verne Death Centenary | |
| The Sultan of the Indies visit on his time travelling Elephant | London | England | May 2006 | | 1 million |
| The Sultan of the Indies visit on his time travelling Elephant | Antwerp | Belgium | July 2006 | Zomer van Antwerpen | 650,000 |
| The Sultan of the Indies visit on his time travelling Elephant | Calais | France | September 2006 | | |
| The Sultan of the Indies visit on his time travelling Elephant | Le Havre | France | October 2006 | | 300,000 |
| The Giant : visits the pont du Gard | Vers-Pont-du-Gard | France | August 2006 | | |
| The Hidden Rhinoceros | Santiago | Chile | January 2007 | Santiago a Mil International Theater Festival | 2 million |
| The geyser of Reykjavik | Reykjavík | Iceland | May 2007 | Reykjavík Arts Festival | 50,000 |
| The fabulous story of the warrior buried alive of Santa Maria | Santa Maria da Feira | Portugal | May 2008 | International Theatre Festival of Santa Maria da Feira | |
| The Giantess of the Titanic and the deep-sea diver | Nantes; Saint-Nazaire | France | June 2009 | Biennial contemporain art opening 'Estuaire' 2009 | 350,000 |
| The Berlin appointment | Berlin | Germany | October 2009 | 20th Anniversary of the Fall of the Berlin Wall | 1.5 million |
| The Invitation Chile | Santiago | Chile | January 2010 | Celebrations of the Bicentennial of Chile | 3 million |
| The deep-sea diver, his hand, and the Little Girl-Giant | Antwerp | Belgium | August 2010 | Zomer van Antwerpen | 800,000 |
| The Giant of Guadalajara | Guadalajara | Mexico | November 2010 | Bicentennial celebrations of the Mexican War of Independence; Mexican Revolution Centenary | 3.5 million |
| The wall fallen from the sky in Guadalajara | Guadalajara | Mexico | November 2010 | Fresco painted in the style of Mexican artist Diego Rivera | - |
| El Xolo | Nantes | France | May 2011 | | 600,000 |
| The wall fallen from the sky in Nantes | Nantes | France | May 2011 | Fresco painted in the style of Mexican artist Diego Rivera | - |
| Sea Odyssey | Liverpool | England | April 2012 | Centenary of the sinking of the Titanic | 800,000 |
| Planck's wall | Nantes | France | June 2014 | | 500,000 |
| Memories of August 1914 | Liverpool | England | July 2014 | Liverpool's World War I centenary commemorations | 1 million |
| The Grandmother fallen from the galaxy into a field in Munster | Limerick | Ireland | September 2014 | National City of Culture 2014 | 250,000 |
| The Incredible and Phenomenal Journey of the Giants to the Streets of Perth | Perth | Australia | February 2015 | Perth International Arts Festival; Anzac Centenary | 1.4 million |
| The Giants | Antwerp | Belgium | June 2015 | Zomer van Antwerpen | 900,000 |
| Les Géants - La grande invitation | Montreal | Canada | May 2017 | Montreal's 375th birthday | |
| The Knight of the Lost Time (Le chevalier du temps perdu) | Geneva | Switzerland | September–October 2017 | | 850,000 |
| Big skate in de ice/Fight against the water | Leeuwarden | Netherlands | August 2018 | European Capital of Culture 2018 | 425,000/450,000 |
| Liverpool's Dream | Liverpool | England | October 2018 The End | 10 Year Anniversary of Liverpool's European Capital of Culture | 1.3 million over 44 performances |
| Bull Machin de Villeurbanne | Villeurbanne | France | September, 2022 | At the invitation of the Theatre Carouge and the city of Geneva | 300,000 |

== Technical data ==
Sources: Portraits des géants on the Nantes website.

| Name | Date of Creation | Height | Length | Weight | Shoe size | Number of operators | Notes |
|---|---|---|---|---|---|---|---|
| The Big Giant | 1993 | 9.5 m | - | 2.2 t | 237 | 32 | Structure of 14 m high 8.50 m width |
| Le Rhinocéros | 1997 | 2.5 m | 5.0 m | - | - | 17 | |
| Le Petit Géant noir | 1998 | 5.5 m | - | 1 t | - | 18 | |
| La Grande Girafe | 2000 | 12.0 m | 15.3 m | 25 t | - | 25 | 4 km/h normally but can run up to 10 km/h |
| La Petite Girafe | 2000 | 5 m | - | - | - | 25 | |
| The Sultan's Elephant | 2005 | 12 m | 21.0 m | 48 t | - | 22 | is moving at 1.5 km/h |
| La Petite Géante | 2005 | 5.5 m | - | 0.8 t | 166 | 18 en 2011; 22 en 2009 | 2.5 km/h by foot 4 km/h with scooter |
| Le Géant en colère (the father of the little giant girl) | 2007 | - | - | - | - | 3 | Presented in Reykjavik only The head of the great giant |
| Le Scaphandrier | 2009 | 9.5 m | - | 2 t | 237 | 30 | The big giant in a diving suit |
| El Xolo | 2011 | 2.8 m | 3.5 m | 0.2 t | - | 20 | Height at withers: 1.8 m Walking speed: 4 km/h Running speed: 6 km/h. |
| El Campesino | 2011 | 9.5 m | - | 2.5 t | 237 | 32 | Mexican for "Le grand géant" |
| La Grand-Mère | 2014 | 7.5 m | - | 1.7 t | 276 | 25 | The first talking giant |
| Bull Machin | 2022 | 4.4 m | | 0.86 t | - | | |

== Gallery ==
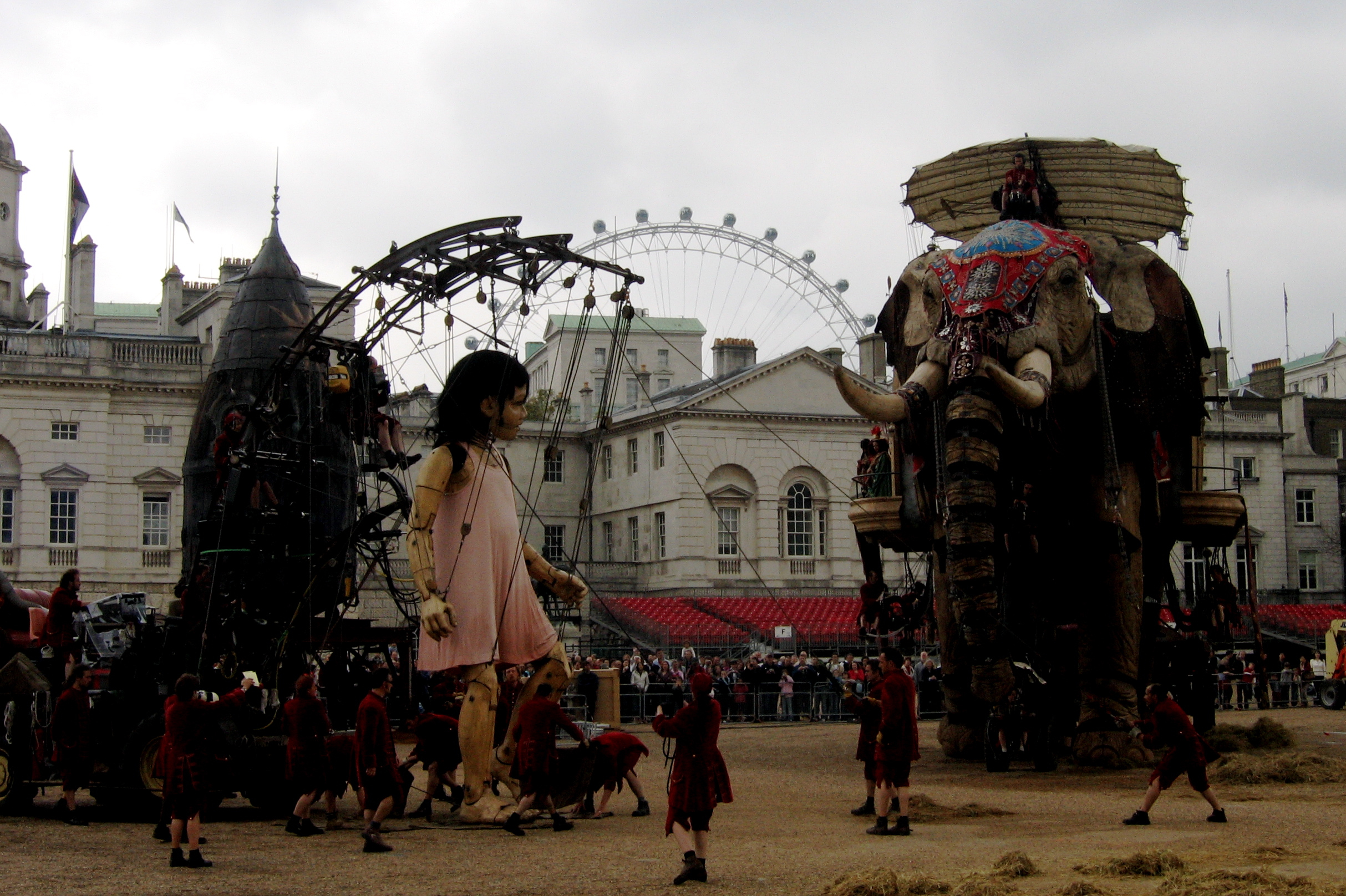
The Sultan's Elephant in London (2006)

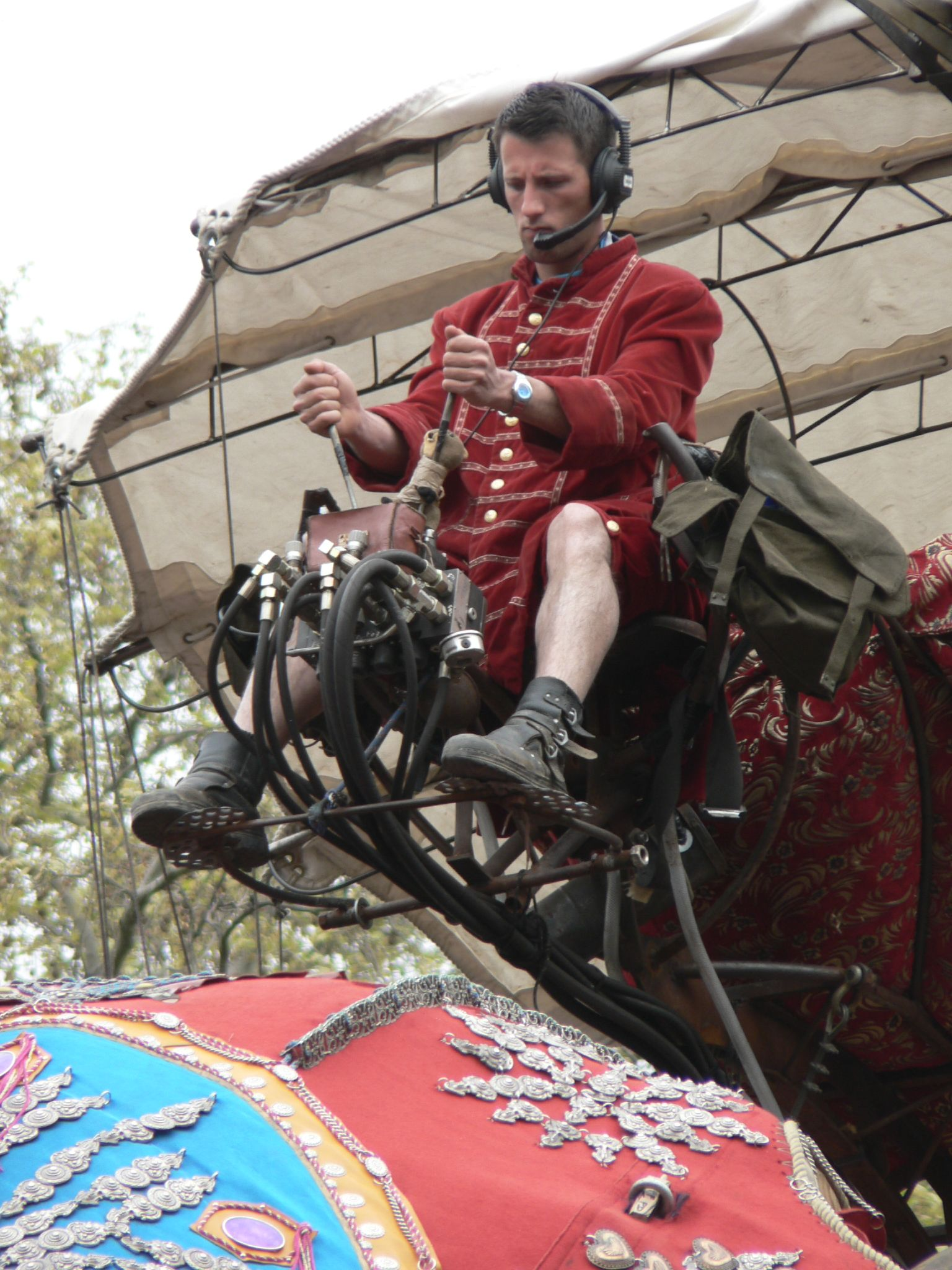
A Royal de Luxe operator manipulates the Sultan's Elephant head.

== Other works ==
- The true history of France
- Roman photo tournage
- The Peplum (with odorama)
- Revolt of the Mannequins. After Nantes in February 2008 and Antwerp, in July 2008, It was played in Berlin, in November 2008
- They were also said to have made another giant, more lightweight elephant used in Take That Presents: The Circus Live, atop which the four band members performed "The Garden". This elephant had to be made much more lightweight to be transported between venues.

== See also ==
- La Princesse, a giant mechanical spider designed by the same man who designed the Sultan's Elephant but produced by La Machine - a different performing arts company.
- Les Balayeurs du désert, an accompanying band who perform much of the music for productions run by the Royal de Luxe.
- Machines of the Isle of Nantes
