= Machines of the Isle of Nantes =

Art project in Nantes, France

Coordinates: 47.20600°N 1.56482°W

The Machines of the Isle (French: Les Machines de l'île; Breton: Mekanikoù an Enez) is an artistic, tourist and cultural project based in Nantes, France. The project is based in the old covered buildings of the former shipyards in Nantes that were at one time used for ship construction (les nefs), and later used as business sites.

== Exhibits ==
The Great Elephant (2007) is a mechanical elephant, 12 metres (39 ft) high and 8 metres (26 ft) wide, made from 45 tons of wood and steel. It can take up to 49 passengers for a 45-minute walk. It is an inexact replica of The Sultan's Elephant from Royal de Luxe, which toured the world from 2005 to 2007; the main difference being that this elephant is designed to carry spectators. The elephant has a water cannon that is used to spray guests and riders with a variable pressure.

The Marine Worlds Carousel (2012) is a gigantic carousel, rising nearly 25 m high and measuring 20 m in diameter. It features 35 moving underwater creatures on three levels: the ocean floor, the depths, and sea and boats. Visitors will be able to move about amidst a ballet of aquatic animals and sea carriages, as well as climb aboard and guide the movements of the Machines.

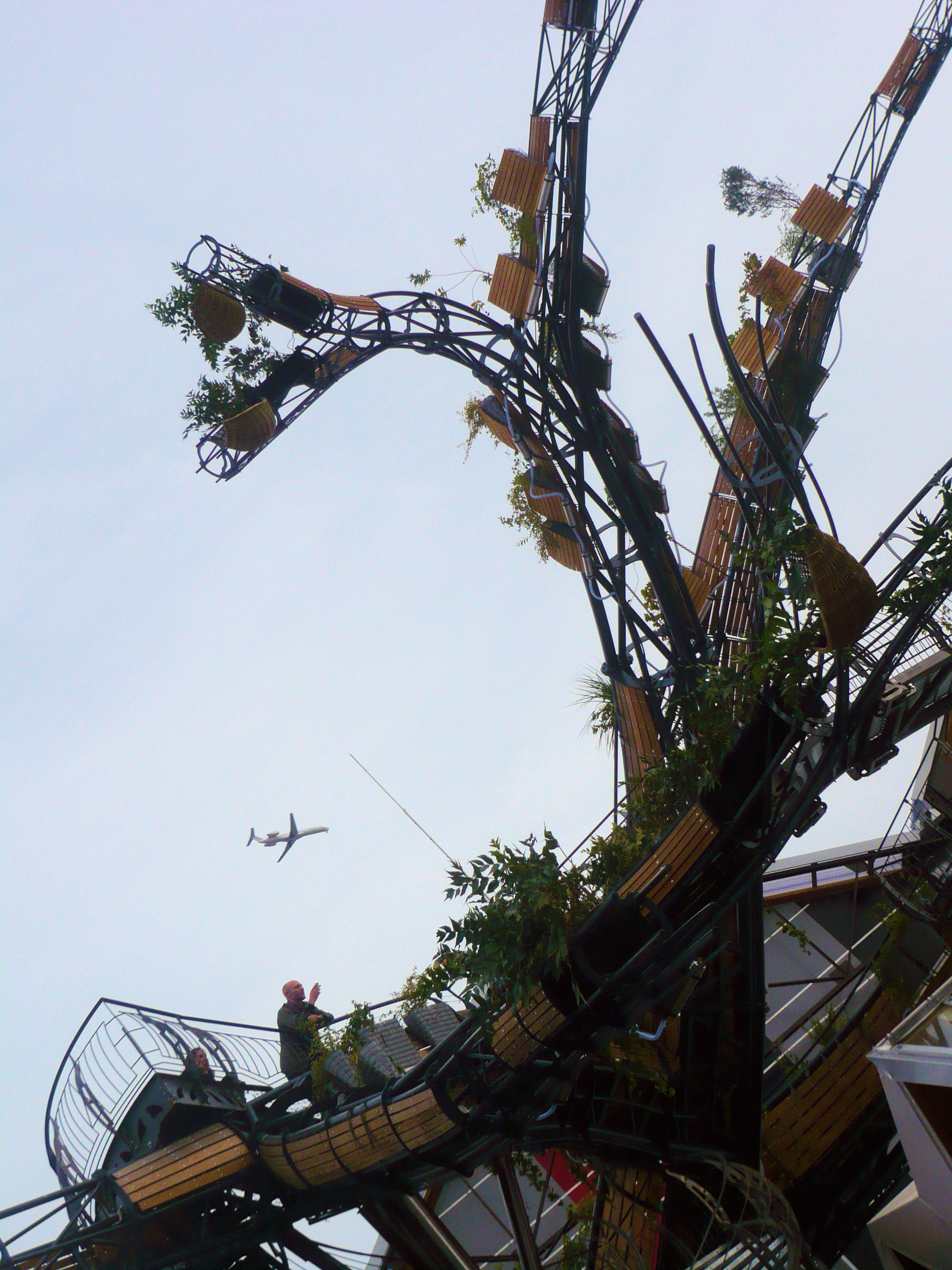
The branch prototype of the Heron Tree

The Heron Tree was an under-construction steel structure planned to be 50 metres in diameter and 30 metres in height, topped with two herons. The project plans to allow visitors to climb either onto the back or onto the wings of the birds for a circular flight over the hanging gardens of the tree. The project was canceled in 2023.

The Machine Gallery is an exhibition place to illustrate the background story of the machines. Some visitors are invited to control marine animals or the European Flight Test Center. The entire process of the construction is on display by sketches, models and films.
