= The Sultan's Elephant =

Show by the Royal de Luxe theatre company

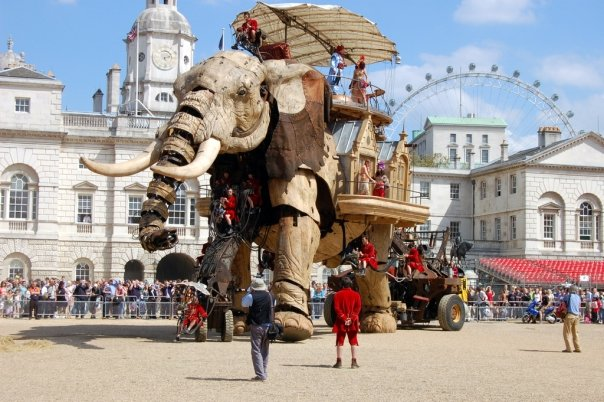
At Horse Guards Parade, London

The Sultan's Elephant was a show created by the Royal de Luxe theatre company, involving a huge moving mechanical elephant, a giant marionette of a girl and other associated public art installations. In French it was called La visite du sultan des Indes sur son éléphant à voyager dans le temps (literally, "Visit from the Sultan of the Indies on His Time-Travelling Elephant"). The show was commissioned to commemorate the centenary of Jules Verne's death, by the two French cities of Nantes and Amiens, funded by a special grant from the French Ministry of Culture and Communication. The show was performed at various locations around the world between 2005 and 2006.

== Design and construction ==
The elephant was designed by François Delarozière. It was made mostly of wood, and was operated by 22 'manipulateurs' using a mixture of hydraulics and motors. It weighed 42 tons, as much as seven African elephants.

[With] hundreds of moving parts and scores of pumping pistons (22 in the trunk alone), the elephant appealed to the same part of the British psyche that admires Heath Robinson contraptions and reveres eccentric inventors. More than 56 square metres of reclaimed poplar was combined with steel ribs to create the elephant's sturdy skeleton. The attention to detail was extraordinary, from the flapping leather ears and deep wrinkles around the eyes to the puffs of dust sent up by its plodding feet, and the snaking, reticulated trunk.

The elephant no longer exists: Helen Marriage of Artichoke, the company that produced the London performance, said "Royal de Luxe were so fed up with being invited all over the world to perform The Sultan's Elephant, they just destroyed it."

A non-exact replica, Le Grand Eléphant (The Great Elephant) was built in Nantes (France) in 2007, as part of the Machines of the Isle of Nantes permanent exhibition. It is 20 feet tall.

== Performances ==
=== Nantes and Amiens ===
The show was first performed in the French cities of Amiens, from 16 to 19 June 2005 and Nantes, from 19 to 22 May 2005.

=== London ===
The Sultan's Elephant show was performed in London from 4 to 7 May 2006. The show started with a rocket "crashing" in Waterloo Place on Thursday May 4, smashing up the tarmac, with smoke coming out from the bottom.

On Friday the elephant arrived along with the Sultan. An oversize marionette emerged from the rocket: this was the girl from the Sultan's dreams. The girl met the elephant. On the Friday evening the elephant wandered around St James's, while the girl went on a journey around London on an opentop AEC Routemaster bus.

On the Saturday the elephant walked to Trafalgar Square, where it rested during lunchtime. Then the girl marionette was lifted by a crane onto the elephant's trunk and was carried in a Grand Parade back to Horseguards Parade while the Sultan appeared with a troop of dancers on top of the elephant.

The girl had a needle and thread, and the things she sewed included a series of cars that were "sewn" to the tarmac.

On the Sunday the show finished with a Grand Finale in which the girl climbed into the rocket, which then 'took off'. This involved the rocket firing, with smoke and flames coming out of the bottom. When the top was removed from the rocket by a crane the girl had disappeared. She had travelled in time.

While they were in London the elephant and the girl were stored at Battersea Power Station, and they were transported with a police escort to the various sites in the early hours of each morning. Many lampposts and traffic lights were removed to allow the elephant through. Between the performance days both the elephant and the girl were left "sleeping" at Horseguards Parade. After each performance the elephant was once again transported in the early hours of the morning back to Battersea Power Station. The return journeys took longer than expected as some of the street furniture had been put back in place too early.

The event, the biggest piece of free theatre ever staged in London, attracted audiences of up to a million people. It was brought to England by the production company Artichoke, which was also responsible for bringing the giant mechanical spider La Princesse to Liverpool in September 2008.

=== Antwerp ===
The Sultan's Elephant show was performed in Antwerp, Belgium, 7–9 July 2006. Besides the elephant, the rocket and the small giant, there was also a carousel with fantasy vehicles.

=== Calais and Le Havre ===
Performed in the French cities of Calais 28 September–1 October 2006 and Le Havre 26–29 October 2006.

=== Associated performances ===
The giant girl performed alone, without the elephant, in Santiago, Chile 25–28 January 2007 and in Reykjavík, Iceland, from 9–12 May 2007.

== Related links ==
- London
  - Official Site
  - BBC report 4 May 2006
  - BBC report 5 May 2006
  - BBC report 6 May 2006
  - BBC report 7 May 2006
  - BBC photographs 5 May 2006
  - BBC photographs 7 May 2006
  - BBC video 5 May 2006
  - The Observer review by Susannah Clapp
  - The Guardian comment by Catherine Bennett
  - The Guardian review by Emma Brockes
  - The Guardian report by Lynn Gardner
  - The Independent on Sunday review by Howard Jacobson
- Antwerp
  - BBC video 10 July 2006
- Calais and Le Havre
  - The Sultan's Elephant in Le Havre on October 2006. Pictures & videos
