= Culture of Liverpool =

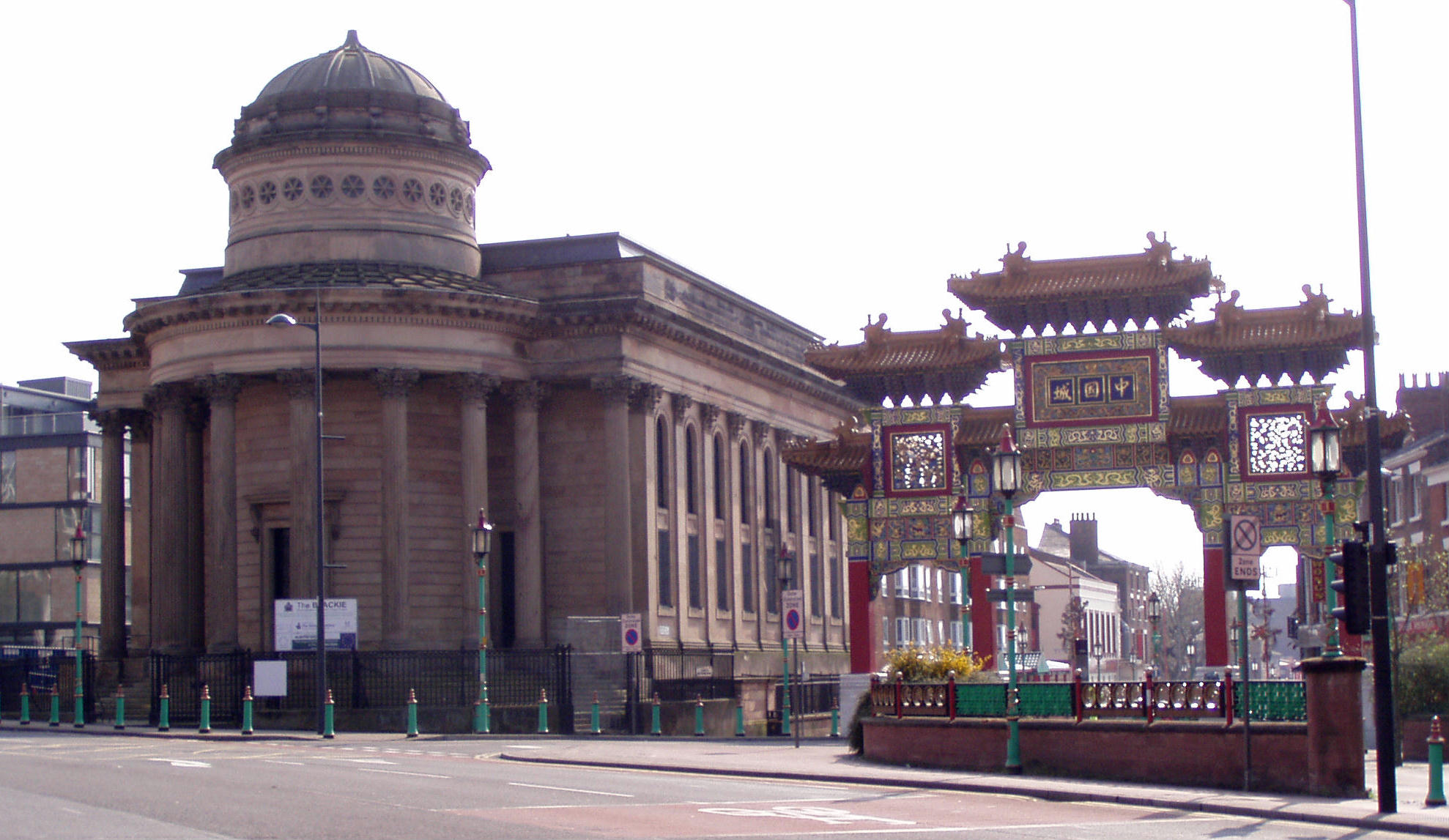
The Black-E community arts centre and the Chinese Arch

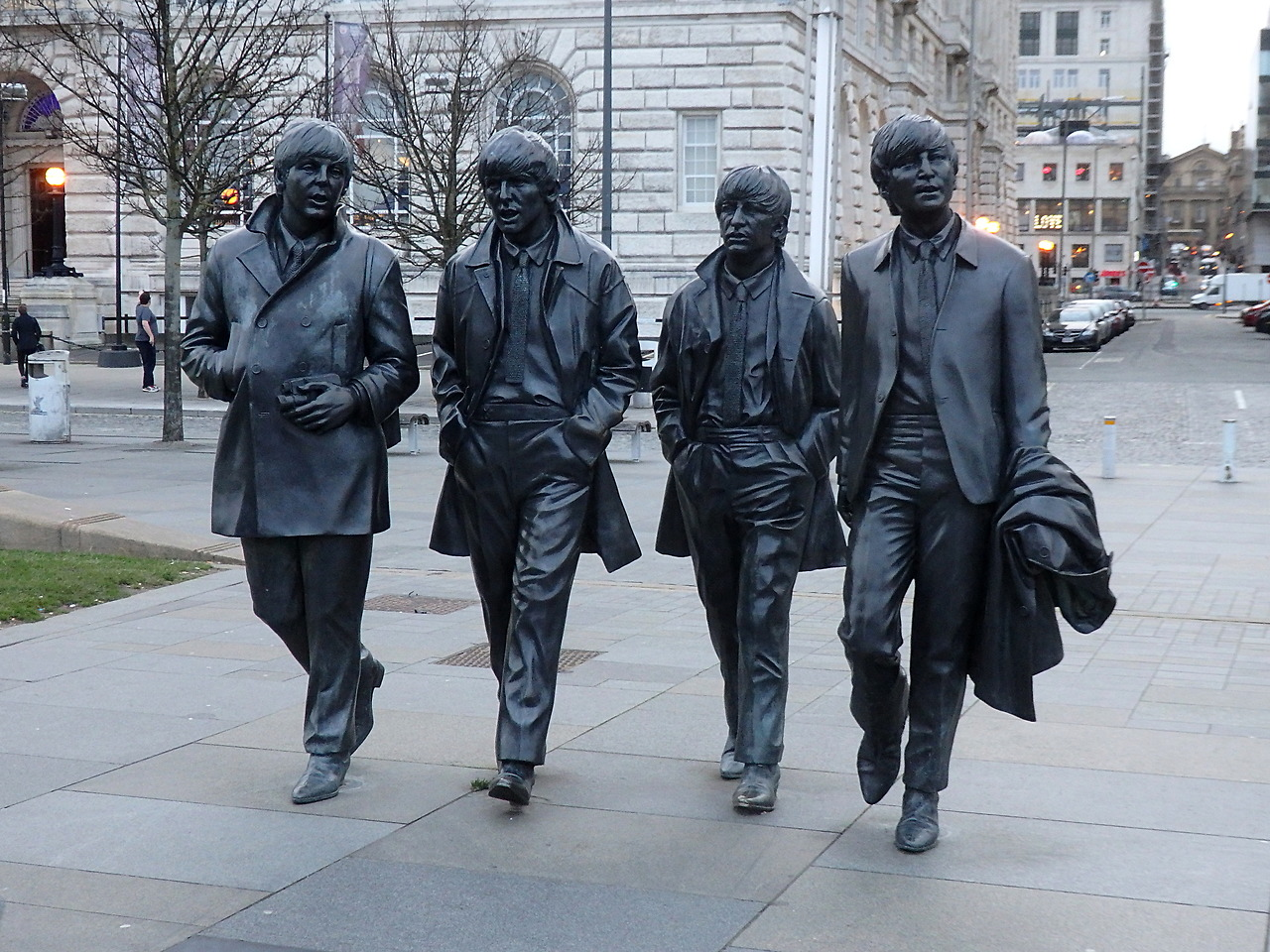
The Beatles statue

The culture of Liverpool goes back as far back as 1715 when Thomas Steers built the world's first commercial dock (Old Dock) paving the way for Liverpool to become one of the world's greatest seaports and was a contributing factor in the Industrial Revolution that began shortly after, bringing culture from all over the world. Examples include the Blue Funnel Line that brought the first Chinese community to Europe and a million Irish people passing through to the New World at the Port of Liverpool. The city is widely known for having the strongest Irish heritage and culture of any UK city and has the highest concentration of Irish pubs per capita, making it the second-highest globally.

Liverpool was named the European Capital of Culture in 2008. Since 2015, Liverpool has been a UNESCO City of Music and Liverpool Maritime Mercantile City held the status of UNESCO World Heritage Site from 2012 to 2021.

Liverpool's musical culture has become popular worldwide and has also become popular among numerous football clubs in the UK. You Will Never Walk Alone from Merseybeat band Gerry and the Pacemakers is the anthem for Liverpool F.C., Borussia Dortmund and Glasgow Celtic. The Beatles' hit single Hey Jude is the anthem for Brentford F.C., Manchester City F.C. and Arsenal F.C.. Other clubs have adopted the song as a pre-match and during the match terrace anthem. Another Beatles hit single, Yellow Submarine, is Villarreal CF's football anthem. Supporters of England national football adopted, as their anthem, Three Lions by the Liverpool rock band The Lightning Seeds, which became a cultural phenomenon in England. Ian Broudie's song is the first song in history with the same performing line-up to top the UK singles chart on four separate occasions.

Liverpool's culture in athletics goes back as far as 1865, when John Hulley, Gymnasiarch of Liverpool was the founder of the British Olympic movement

Liverpool is known for its cultural scene, encompassing a vibrant music heritage and a thriving arts and theatre scene from its Black African and Irish communities, all rooted in its maritime past. Many Sea shanty songs refer to Liverpool and musician Stan Hugill to when Cunard Yanks brought Rock and roll to Liverpool.

The Mersey Ferrys are an integral part of Liverpool culture, serving as a vital transport link and a symbol of the city region's identity for over 800 years beginning in 1150, connecting communities and attracting visitors, made famous in the 1960s with the Gerry and the Pacemakers hit single Ferry Cross the Mersey.

The Beatles exemplified changing culture dynamics, not only in music, but in fashion and lifestyle. Over half a century after their emergence, they continue to have a worldwide cultural impact.

== Capital of Culture ==
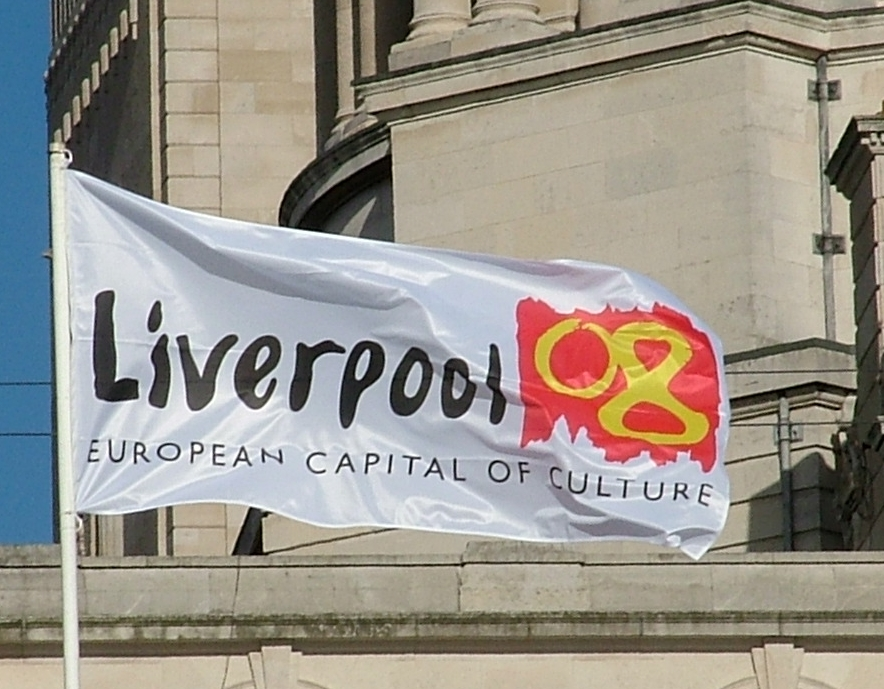
Liverpool European Capital of Culture 2008 flag, flying in front of the Port of Liverpool Building

On 4 June 2008, Liverpool was named a European Capital of Culture for 2008, the other site being Stavanger, Norway.

== Literature ==
Beryl Bainbridge, one of England's greatest contemporary writers, grew up in Liverpool. Many of her stories are set there.

A number of notable authors have visited Liverpool including Daniel Defoe, Washington Irving, Thomas De Quincey, Herman Melville, Nathaniel Hawthorne, Charles Dickens, Gerard Manley Hopkins and Hugh Walpole all of whom spent extended periods in the city. Hawthorne was stationed in Liverpool as United States consul between 1853 and 1856. Although he is not known to have ever visited Liverpool, Jung famously had a vivid dream of the city which he analysed in one of his works.

== Cultural media ==
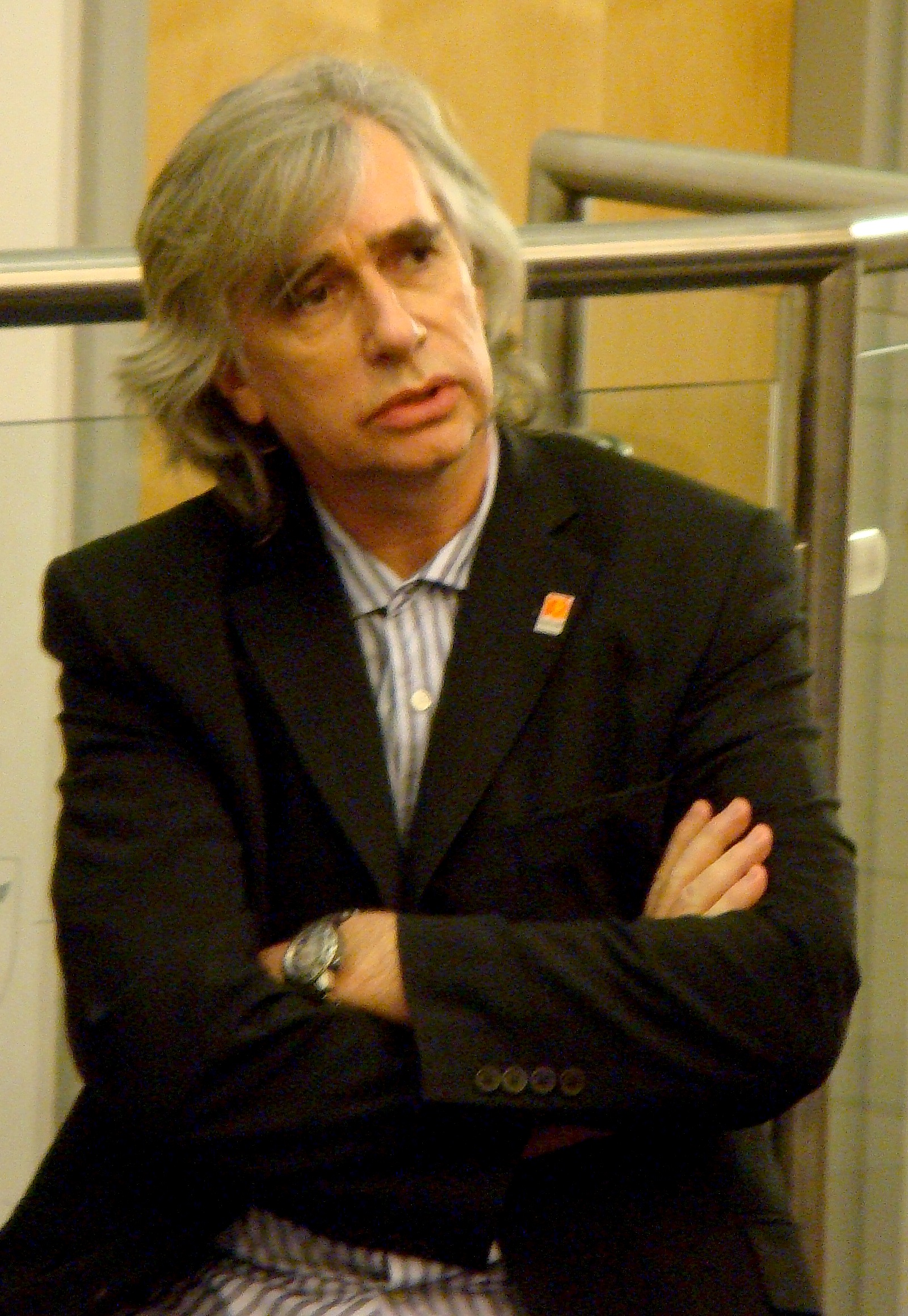
Phil Redmond, writer of Brookside and Hollyoaks TV series filmed in Liverpool

Liverpool is a popular filming location. It also has a TV station, Liverpool TV, and several radio stations including Radio Merseyside. Jimmy McGovern has been awarded Freedom of Liverpool for his TV writing contributions to Liverpool.

Liverpool F.C., featured in the first edition of Match of the Day, with the BBC screening highlights of their match against Arsenal F.C. at Anfield in August 1964. The programme's audience was estimated at only 20,000 less than half the attendance at the Anfield stadium. Televised football has become a significant global cultural phenomenon, and this growth in broadcast attendance continued when Liverpool F.C. officially became the most watched team globally in the Premier League, with a cumulative audience of 471 million for all 38 top-flight games in the 2024–25 season.

Our World was the first live multinational, multi-satellite television production, broadcast in 25 countries with audiences of 400-700 million people. The Beatles performing All You Need Is Love topped the event and became an anthem for Counterculture embracing flower power philosophy.

The Grand National is among the most famous and televised watched horse racing shows, globally viewed by about 800 million around the world. The event is prominent in British culture, dating back to 1829.

== Music ==
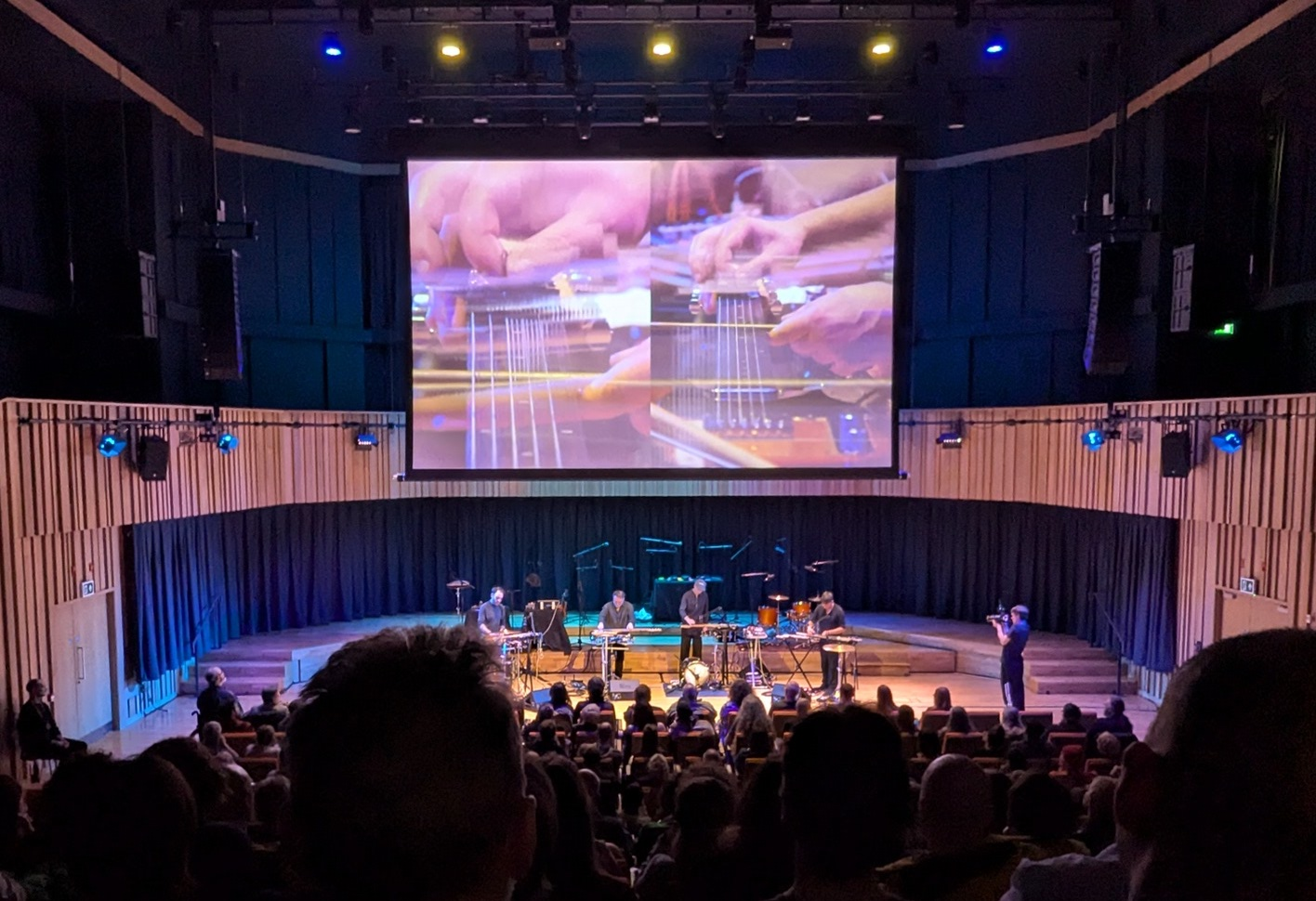
Tung Auditorium, Yoko Ono Lennon Centre

Liverpool is in the Guinness World Records for the city with the most number one hits in the UK singles chart with 58, and the British Music Experience is based in Liverpool

The Beatles have the most number one hits on the Billboard Hot 100 with a total of 20 songs reaching the top spot.

Paul McCartney had nine number one hits on the Billboard Hot 100 charts, both as a solo artist, and as co-writer of A World Without Love (credited as Lennon–McCartney), although the song was written entirely by Paul. It was recorded by Peter and Gordon; the former was co-writer of Elton John's cover of Lucy in the Sky with Diamonds, while the latter was co-writer of Stars on 45 (song). Paul was co-writer of Michael Jackson's Say Say Say and wrote the song Ebony and Ivory, performed by Stevie Wonder.

Liverpool was the centre of Merseybeat in the 1960s. The Beatles set a record that may never be broken – five songs held the Billboard Hot 100 top five songs, and since then, has been home to music scenes The Cavern Club and Eric's Club. The music coming out of Liverpool during that time was so profound that American rock and roll star Chuck Berry paid tribute to the city by writing and producing studio album St. Louis to Liverpool, with the song The Liverpool Drive as one of the tracking records.

The first British woman to have a number one hit in the UK music charts was Lita Roza with her 1953 record of (How Much Is) That Doggie in the Window?. The Liverbirds, a band from Liverpool, are widely considered to be one of the world's first All-female bands emerging on the Merseybeat scene in 1963, and Cilla Black is the highest- placed female artist on the List of best-selling singles of the 1960s in the United Kingdom with her 1964 single Anyone Who Had a Heart.

Ken Dodd is third on the List of best-selling singles of the 1960s in the United Kingdom with his single Tears.

Paul McCartney and Wings is first on the List of best-selling singles of the 1970s in the United Kingdom with his single Mull of Kintyre, and was the third best selling artist of the 1970s after Led Zeppelin and Elton John.

The Real Thing was the first all-black British band credited as the first to achieve a UK number one hit with their song You to Me Are Everything. Their success was a cultural achievement of black British musicians demonstrating that home-grown talent could rival their American counterparts.

Apple Records, founded by members of The Beatles, launched the careers of James Taylor and Mary Hopkin with one of the best-selling singles of the 1960s, Those Were the Days.

Nigel Olsson was a member of the Liverpool Merseybeat band The Big Three before joining Elton John as the drummer in the Elton John Band in 1970.

Aynsley Dunbar, a member of Journey, was inducted into the Rock and Roll Hall of Fame and was ranked by Rolling Stone as the 27th greatest drummer of all time.

Liverpool musician Gordon Stretton took Jazz culture to Argentina and is credited for bringing jazz culture to Latin America.

Frankie Goes to Hollywood gained notoriety in the 1980s for their provocative music, raunchy visuals and unashamedly sexual themes, particularly with their hit song Relax, that challenged mainstream norms and became a cultural phenomenon, particularly with the LGBTQ+ community; their unvarnished depiction of life, including their sexuality, ushered in a brief era of mainstream acceptance of gay culture. The song is second on the List of best-selling singles of the 1980s in the United Kingdom.

Elvis Costello produced and was backing vocalist alongside Dick Cuthell, trumpet musician with The Specials; their 1984 single Free Nelson Mandela had a role in the downfall of Apartheid, as it raised awareness of the issue and became an anthem of the anti-apartheid movement in South Africa. The Guardian referred to it as one of the most effective protest songs in history.

American singer and entertainer Michael Jackson performed The final European show of his Bad World Tour in Liverpool at Aintree Racecourse to a crowd of 125,000 people – the largest show of the tour – it was also the largest concert ever performed by a solo artist in the United Kingdom at that time.

Liverpool is also home to the UK's oldest-established orchestra, the Royal Liverpool Philharmonic Orchestra, headquartered in the Philharmonic Hall, and a youth orchestra. Sir Adrian Boult was brought up and his family connected in the Liverpool shipping and oil trade, and internationally renowned conductor Sir Simon Rattle also hails from Liverpool. Max Bruch was one of the most notable conductors of the RLPO and dedicated his composition Kol Nidre to the city's Jewish community. Sir Edward Elgar dedicated his famous Pomp and Circumstance March No.1 to the Liverpool Orchestral Society, and the piece had its first performance in the city in 1901. Among Liverpool's curiosities, the Austrian émigré Fritz Spiegl is notable for not only becoming a world expert on the etymology of Scouse, but for composing the music for Z-Cars, as well as the Radio 4 UK Theme. It hosted the Eurovision Song Contest 2023.

The Yoko Ono Lennon Centre opened in Liverpool in 2022 including a world-class medium-size concert hall with space for a 70 piece orchestra (symphony/philharmonic size) and seating capacity for 400 people.

== Poetry ==
During the late 1960s the city became well known for the Liverpool poets, who include Roger McGough and the late Adrian Henri. An anthology of poems, The Mersey Sound, written by Henri, McGough and Brian Patten, has sold over 500,000 copies since first being published in 1967.

== Theatre ==
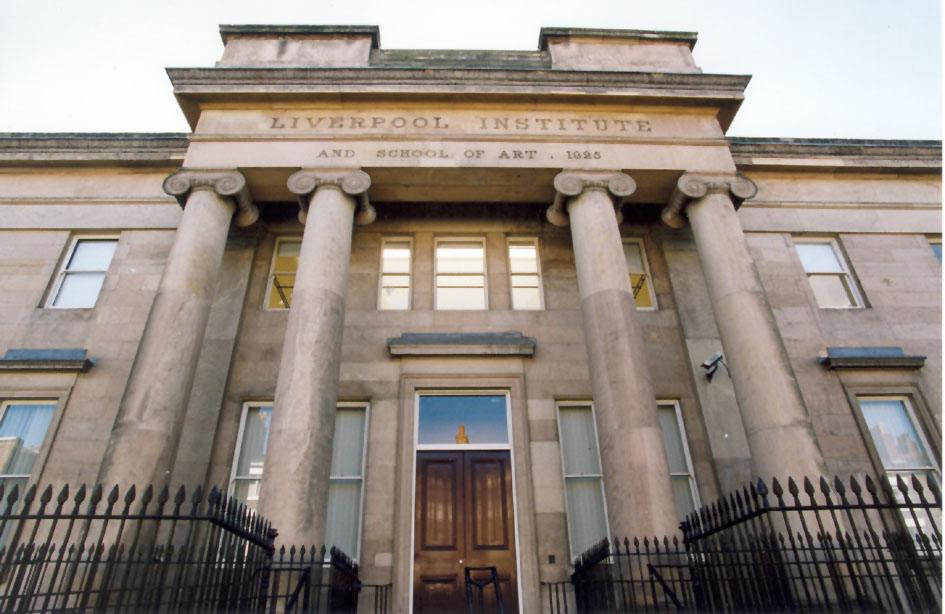
Liverpool Institute for Performing Arts

Liverpool also has a history of performing arts, reflected every summer in its annual theatrical highlight, the Liverpool Shakespeare Festival, and by the number of theatres in the city. These include the Empire, Everyman, Playhouse, Royal Court, and Unity Theatres. The Everyman, Unity, and Playhouse Theatres all run their own theatre companies.

== Visual arts ==
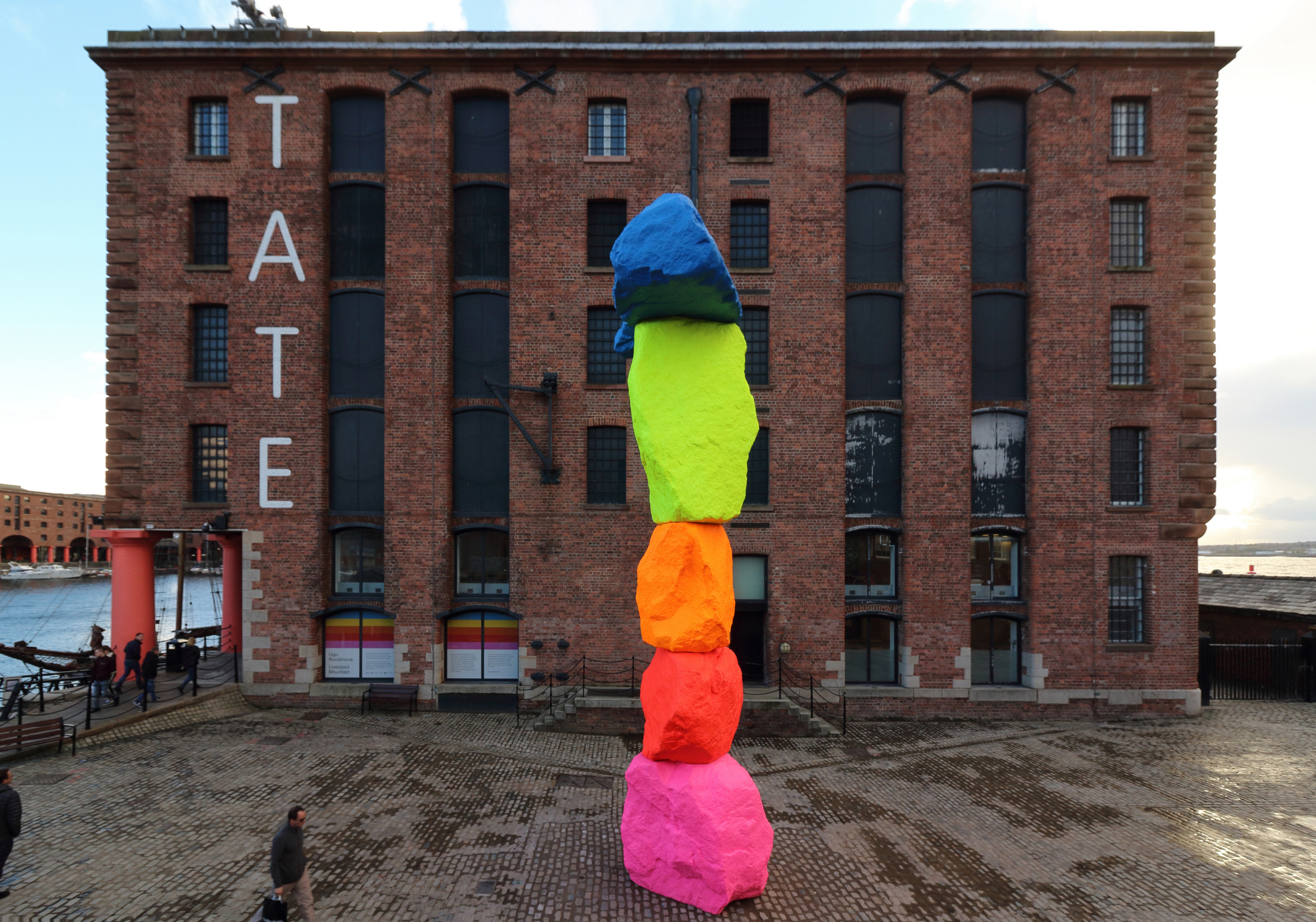
Tate Liverpool at the Albert Dock

Liverpool has more galleries and national museums than any other city in the United Kingdom apart from London. National Museums Liverpool is the only English national collection based wholly outside London. The Tate Liverpool gallery houses the modern art collection of the Tate in the North of England and was, until the opening of Tate Modern, the largest exhibition space dedicated to modern art in the United Kingdom. The FACT centre hosts touring multimedia exhibitions, whilst the Walker Art Gallery houses an extensive collection of Pre-Raphaelites. Sudley House contains another major collection of pre-20th-century art, and the number of galleries continues to expand: Ceri Hand Gallery opened in 2008, exhibiting primarily contemporary art, and Liverpool University's Victoria Building was re-opened as a public art gallery and museum to display the university's artwork and historical collections which include the second-largest display of art by Audubon outside the US.

The Sheppard-Worlock Statue is a statue of Derek Worlock, the English archbishop of Liverpool who played a crucial role in the 1982 visit by Pope John Paul II to the United Kingdom, the first papal visit to the UK for 400 years. A million people lined the route from Liverpool airport to the city, showcasing the immense public interest in The Pope's visit. The Pope attended services at Liverpool Metropolitan Cathedral and Liverpool Anglican Cathedral.

Superlambanana reflects the history of Liverpool when the Elder Dempster Lines played a crucial role in the banana trade. It was Alfred Lewis Jones, the controlling partner of Elder Dempster, who is credited with introducing the banana to the British mass market in 1884. Liverpool Blue Star Line and Vestey was the largest retailer of meat in the world at that time.

The John Lennon Peace Monument is dedicated to the memory of John Lennon, a prominent figure in the peace movement, particularly during the Vietnam War, through his music, activism and his Bed-in for peace events with Yoko Ono, most notably with Give Peace a Chance and Imagine.

Memories of August 1914 was an event staged in July 2014 to mark 100 years since the start of World War I.

Sea Odyssey: Giant Spectacular was an event staged in April 2012 to commemorate the 100th anniversary of the sinking of the RMS Titanic.

Liverpool's Dream was an event staged in October 2018 to mark the 10th anniversary of Liverpool's year as European Capital of Culture in 2008.

La Princesse was a 15-metre mechanical spider that roamed around Liverpool in 2008.

Liverpool and the surrounding area boasts several beaches including the Crosby Beach, featuring Antony Gormley's Another place statues.

Artists have also come from the city, including painter George Stubbs who was born in Liverpool in 1724, as well as Luke Fildes and Richard Ansdell.

Liverpool's maritime heritage has produced many painters of Marine art, including Samuel Walters, William Halsall and many more.

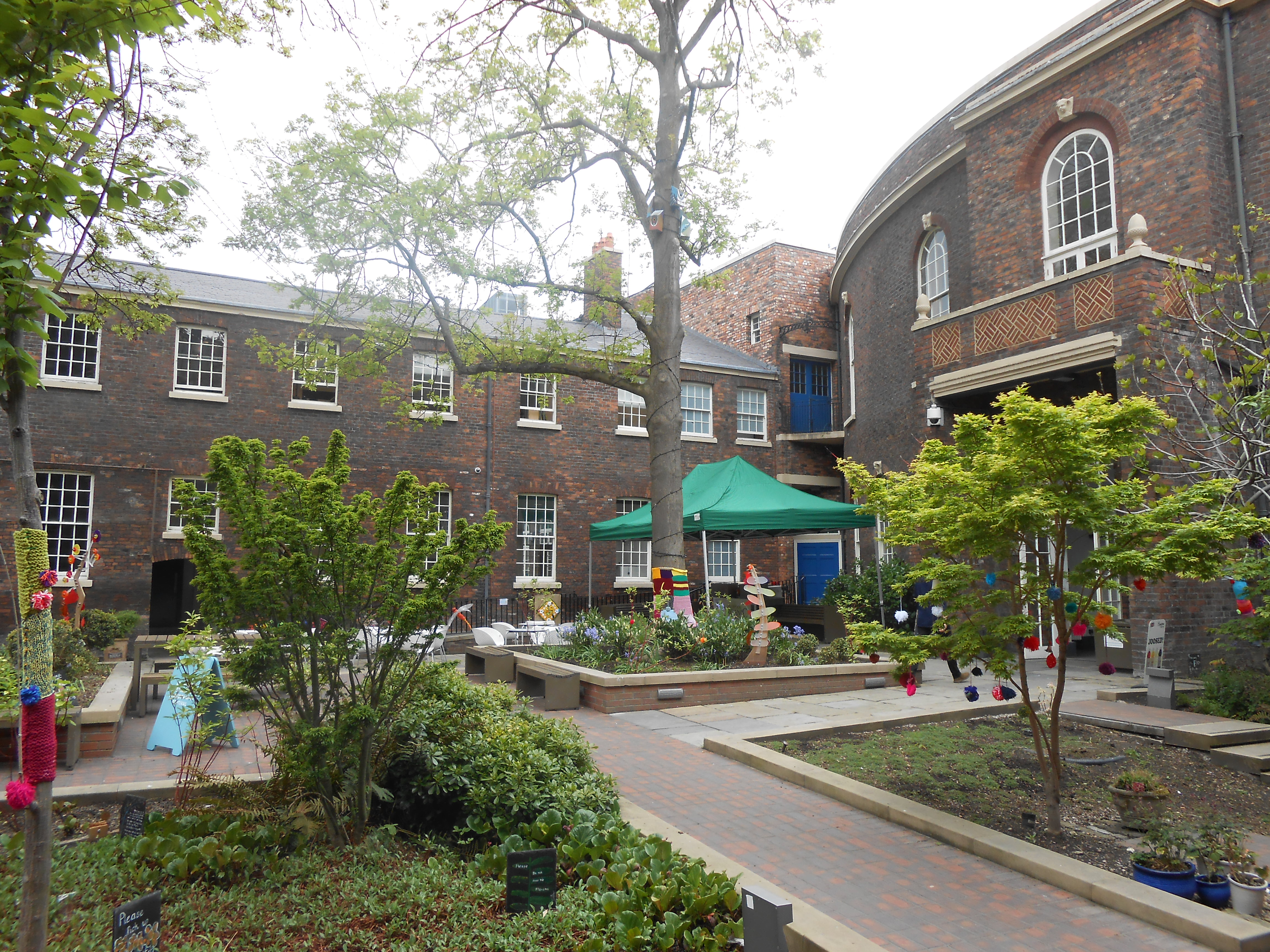
Bluecoat Chambers Arts centre

The Liverpool Biennial Festival of Arts runs from mid-September to late November and comprises three main sections; the International, The Independents and New Contemporaries, although fringe events are timed to coincide. It was during the 2004 Festival that Yoko Ono's work "My Mother is Beautiful" caused widespread public protest when photographs of a naked woman's pubic area were exhibited on the main shopping street. Despite protests, the work remained in place.

== Cuisine ==
Salt and pepper chips are believed to have been invented in Liverpool as a fusion of Chinese and Scouse cuisine.

Global international food producers and retailers Vestey Foods was founded in the Port of Liverpool in 1897.

Scouse is associated with the Port of Liverpool.

John West Foods was established in the Port of Liverpool, bringing canned fish such as tuna and salmon to the UK.

Princes Group was also founded in Liverpool's seaport, and, like John West Foods, brought canned food to the UK.

== Heritage and parades ==
=== St. Patrick's Day ===
Liverpool's celebration of St. Patrick's Day is particularly prominent due to the city's significant historical and cultural ties to Ireland. Often referred to as "the 33rd county of Ireland," Liverpool has a large population of Irish descent, a connection that was solidified by the substantial influx of Irish migrants during the Great Famine in the 1840s. This migration deeply embedded Irish culture within the city, influencing its unique cultural identity, particularly its music, social customs, and the local Scouse accent.

The focal point of the annual celebration is a large parade that winds through the city center. This event draws thousands of spectators and features floats, marching bands, and participants celebrating Irish heritage. Beyond the parade, the city becomes a hub of festivities, with many of Liverpool's authentic Irish pubs, such as O'Neill's and The Flanagan's Apple, serving as centers of activity with bands and traditional food and drink.

=== Orange Order ===
The Liverpool Provincial Grand Orange Lodge is a Protestant fraternity within the Orange Order. It is a part of the Grand Orange Lodge of England. The Liverpool Grand Lodge is one of the most active branches of the Orange Order in England, with a history in the city dating back to the early 1800s. Orange Order member John Houlding, founder of Liverpool F.C, was a prominent figurehead particularly in relation to the religious and political affiliations that were prevalent in the city at the time.

The first Twelfth of July parade in Liverpool took place in 1819, and the organization has since become a fixture in Liverpool's cultural and social fabric. The annual Twelfth parade, which commemorates the Battle of the Boyne, is a major spectacle, with Orange Lodges under the Grand Orange Lodge of England from across the nation joining the procession. The parades feature marching bands, elaborate banners and ceremonial attire, and are held in both Liverpool and nearby Southport.

== See also ==
- Architecture of Liverpool
- List of public art in Liverpool
