= List of Freemen of the City of Liverpool =

The title of Freedom of the City is an honorary title granted by a city or corporation. It is granted to individuals to recognise exceptional services, usually to the city, or occasionally to the nation. Since the enactment of the Honorary Freedom of Boroughs Act 1885, councils of boroughs and cities in England and Wales have been permitted to resolve to admit "persons of distinction" to be honorary freemen. This list is based on that published by the Liverpool City Council. The Honour can also be awarded to Military Units or other Uniformed Services. when done this is referred to as the "Freedom of Entry".

Name	Dates	Appointed	Notes
Lieutenant General Sir Andrew Clarke	1824–1902	7 July 1886	Military engineer, then colonial official who became Governor of the Straits Settlements; earlier he helped to stabilise the dam at Lake Vyrnwy.
Sir Andrew Barclay Walker	1824–93	9 November 1889	Developer of breweries, local politician, benefactor, and founder of the Walker Art Gallery.
William Cliff		7 January 1891	Liverpool merchant who paid for the building of the Home for Ancient Mariners.
William Rathbone MP	1819–1902	3 June 1891	Liverpool merchant who worked to improve the nursing services in the city, and helped to found Liverpool University; he was MP for the Liverpool constituency.
Henry Tate	1819–99	3 June 1891	Sugar refiner in Liverpool, founder of the Tate Gallery, and benefactor of Liverpool University.
William Ewart Gladstone MP	1809–98	5 October 1892	Politician, born in Liverpool, who was Prime Minister four times.
Samuel Greg Rathbone	1823–1903	14 February 1894	Merchant who established considerable trade between Britain and China. Long time member of the city council and promoter of elementary education.
Thomas Hughes	c1838–1923	27 October 1897	Mayor of Liverpool 1889–1890 and Lord Mayor 1896–1897. Took a prominent part in securing the extension of the city boundaries in 1895. As a magistrate worked for the reform of the licensing of public houses. Later knighted.
John Brancker	c1818–1903	17 January 1900	Businessman and banker, chairman of the Mersey Docks and Harbour Board
Benn Wolfe Levy		24 April 1901	Born in New South Wales, established the David Lewis Trust for the benefit of the working classes of Liverpool and Manchester.
Henry Yates Thompson	1838–1928	24 April 1901	Born in Liverpool, a collector of illuminated manuscripts, proprietor of the Pall Mall Gazette, and benefactor.
Field Marshal Frederick Sleigh Earl Roberts	1832–1914	24 April 1901	Army officer in charge of British troops in the Second Boer War.
Sir William Bower Forwood	1840–1928	4 June 1902	Merchant, ship owner and politician; involved in financing the building of Liverpool Cathedral. First chairman of the Liverpool Overhead Railway.
Frederick Arthur Stanley, Earl of Derby	1841–1908	3 February 1904	Politician and Governor General of Canada.
Robert Durning Holt	1832–1908	3 February 1904	Liverpool's first Lord Mayor.
Andrew Carnegie	1835–1919	3 August 1911	Steelmaker and philanthropist who founded many free public libraries.
Robert Gladstone	1833–1919	3 August 1911	Merchant who gave his name to Gladstone Dock: chairman of the Mersey Docks and Harbour Board, and involved in the founding of Liverpool University and the planning of Liverpool Cathedral.
Edward George Villiers Stanley, 17th Earl of Derby	1865–1948	3 July 1912	Politician who twice became Secretary of State for War and was the British Ambassador to France from 1918 to 1920.
William Morris Hughes	1862–1952	29 March 1916	Prime Minister of Australia 1915–1923
Sir William Benjamin Bowring	1837–1916	6 September 1916	Senior partner in a shipping firm, and local politician who gave the Roby Hall estate to the city; it is now known as Bowring Park, Knowsley. He married Isabel Maclean Jarvis, who was sympathetic to the suffering and needy among the poor of Liverpool.
Sir Charles Petrie		6 June 1917	Chairman of the Tramways Committee.
Admiral Sir David Beatty	1871–1936	4 December 1918	Admiral in the First World War and later First Sea Lord.
Field Marshal Sir Douglas Haig	1861–1928	4 December 1918	Commander of the British Expeditionary Force in the First World War.
John Rankin		7 December 1921	An early benefactor of what was to become the University of Liverpool.
Sir Archibald Tutton Salvidge	1863–1928	2 September 1925	Political organiser, once described as 'the king of Liverpool'.
Sir Thomas White		24 September 1934	Chairman of the Joint Tunnel Committee who developed the Queensway Tunnel.
Sir James Sexton	1856–1938	24 September 1934	Trade unionist who was head of the National Union of Dock Labour in Liverpool and a founder member of the Independent Labour Party.
Sir Frederick Charles Bowring	1856–1936	24 September 1934	Chairman of C T Bowring & Co., merchants and shipowners. Lord Mayor of Liverpool 1925–1927.
Frederick Marquis, Lord Woolton	1883–1964	1 May 1946	Businessman and politician who was involved in the management of Lewis's department store, was Minister of Food in the Second World War, and later Chairman of the Conservative Party.
Admiral Sir Max Kennedy Horton	1883–1951	1 May 1946	Submarine commander in the First World War and commander-in-chief of the Western Approaches in the Second World War.
Alfred Earnest Shennan	1887–1959	1 May 1946	Architect who designed many of Liverpool's art deco cinemas.
Sir Charles Sydney Jones	1872–1947	1 May 1946	Partner in Alfred Holt & Co., benefactor of Liverpool University and Lord Mayor of Liverpool.
Lord Cohen of Birkenhead	1900–1977	30 April 1970	Birkenhead-born doctor who became the senior physician at Liverpool Royal Infirmary, Professor of Medicine at Liverpool University, and served in other major positions in the medical profession.
Major Sir Arthur Harold Bibby	1889–1986	30 April 1970	A partner in the Bibby Line and the first Bibby baronet.
Sir Joseph Jackson Cleary	1902–1993	30 April 1970	Politician who was Labour MP for the Liverpool Wavertree constituency and later Lord Mayor of Liverpool.
Sir Alan Cecil Tod	1887–1970	30 April 1970	Chairman of the Liverpool Cathedral Executive Committee who helped to raise money towards its building.
Elizabeth Margaret Braddock MP	1899–1970	30 April 1970	Known as "Bessie" Braddock, a trade union activist and Labour MP for the Liverpool Exchange constituency.
Sir John Moores	1896–1993	30 April 1970	Businessman and philanthropist who established Littlewoods Football pools and Littlewoods mail-order business. Liverpool John Moores University is named after him.
Robert Paisley	1919–1996	23 November 1983	Better known as Bob Paisley; player for Liverpool F.C., then captain, and later manager and director of the club.
John Lennon	1940–1980	7 March 1984	Musician, composer, and political activist; member of The Beatles.
George Harrison	1943–2001	7 March 1984	Musician and composer; member of The Beatles.
Paul McCartney	1942 –	7 March 1984	Musician, composer and animal rights activist; member of The Beatles.
Richard Starkey	1940 –	7 March 1984	Better known as Ringo Starr, drummer of The Beatles.
Eric Heffer MP	1922–1991	27 March 1991	Left-wing politician, president of the Liverpool Trades Council, later MP for the Liverpool Walton constituency.
President Mandela	1918 –2013	6 July 1994	Anti-apartheid activist who became the first black President of South Africa.
David Sheppard, Bishop of Liverpool	1929–2005	24 August 1994	International cricketer who became Bishop of Liverpool. Worked closely with Archbishop Derek Worlock.
Derek Worlock, Archbishop of Liverpool	1920–1996	24 August 1994	Bishop of Portsmouth, then Archbishop of Liverpool. Worked closely with Bishop David Sheppard.
Roy Castle	1932–1994	24 August 1994	Entertainer and charity worker; the Roy Castle Lung Cancer Foundation is named after him.
Ken Dodd	1927 – 2018	31 January 2001	Liverpool comedian, actor, singer, composer, entertainer, and charity worker.
Adrian Henri	1932–2000	31 January 2001	Birkenhead-born poet and painter; one of the Liverpool poets.
Roger McGough	1937 –	31 January 2001	Liverpool-born poet; one of the Liverpool poets.
Brian Patten	1946 –	31 January 2001	Liverpool-born poet and author of children's books; one of the Liverpool poets.
Terry Leahy	1956 –	31 January 2001	Businessman born in Liverpool who became the chief executive of Tesco.
Simon Weston	1961 –	31 January 2001	British soldier injured in the Falklands War who later became recognised for his charity work.
Professor Rex Makin	1925–2017	11 June 2003	Liverpool solicitor who has been involved in high profile and controversial cases.
Gerry Marsden	1942 – 2021	28 January 2009	Musician; onetime leader of Gerry & the Pacemakers
Norah Button		28 January 2009	Principal of the Liverpool Theatre School
Professor Peter Toyne	1939–	3 March 2010	First Vice-Chancellor of Liverpool John Moores University
Stephen Yip		18 January 2012	Founder of the children's charity Kind.
Lord Heseltine	1933–	13 March 2012	President of the Board of Trade (nicknamed "Minister for Merseyside") for helping to rebuild the city after the 1981 Toxteth riots.
Wally Brown		7 November 2012	Former principal of Liverpool Community College; mediator in the 1981 Toxteth riots.
Ricky Tomlinson		6 October 2014	English actor.
97 Hillsborough victims		22 September 2016	All those who died in the Hillsborough disaster of 1989. (Note: The names of those awarded, in alphabetical order, and with their ages at the time of death are as follows: John Alfred Anderson (62); Colin Mark Ashcroft (19); James Gary Aspinall (18): Kester Roger Marcus Ball (16); Gerard Baron Snr (67): Simon Bell (17): Barry Sidney Bennett (26); David John Benson (22); David William Birtle (22); Tony Bland (22); Paul David Brady (21); Andrew Mark Brookes (26); Carl Brown (18); David Steven Brown (25); Henry Thomas Burke (47); Peter Andrew Burkett (24); Paul William Carlile (19); Raymond Thomas Chapman (50); Gary Christopher Church (19): Joseph Clark (29); Paul Clark (18); Gary Collins (22); Stephen Paul Copoc (20); Tracey Elizabeth Cox (23); James Philip Delaney (19); Christopher Barry Devonside (18); Christopher Edwards (29); Vincent Michael Fitzsimmons (34); Thomas Steven Fox (21); Jon-Paul Gilhooley (10); Barry Glover (27); Ian Thomas Glover (20); Derrick George Godwin (24); Roy Harry Hamilton (34); Philip Hammond (14); Eric Hankin (33); Gary Harrison (27); Stephen Francis Harrison (31); Peter Andrew Harrison (15); David Hawley (39); James Robert Hennessy (29); Paul Anthony Hewitson (26); Carl Darren Hewitt (17); Nicholas Michael Hewitt (16); Sarah Louise Hicks (19); Victoria Jane Hicks (15); Gordon Rodney Horn (20); Arthur Horrocks (41); Thomas Howard (39); Thomas Anthony Howard (14); Eric George Hughes (42); Alan Johnston (29); Christine Anne Jones (27); Gary Philip Jones (18); Richard Jones (25); Nicholas Peter Joynes (27); Anthony Peter Kelly (29); Michael David Kelly (38); Carl David Lewis (18); David William Mather (19); Brian Christopher Matthews (38); Francis Joseph McAllister (27); John McBrien (18); Marian Hazel McCabe (21); Joseph Daniel McCarthy (21); Peter McDonnell (21); Alan McGlone (28); Keith McGrath (17); Paul Brian Murray (14); Lee Nicol (14); Stephen Francis O'Neill (17); Jonathon Owens (18); William Roy Pemberton (23); Carl William Rimmer (21); David George Rimmer (38); Graham John Roberts (24); Steven Joseph Robinson (17); Henry Charles Rogers (17); Colin Andrew Hugh William Sefton (23); Inger Shah (38); Paula Ann Smith (26); Adam Edward Spearritt (14); Philip John Steele (15); David Leonard Thomas (23); Patrick John Thompson (35); Peter Reuben Thompson (30); Stuart Paul William Thompson (17); Peter Francis Tootle (21); Christopher James Traynor (26); Martin Kevin Traynor (16); Kevin Tyrrell (15); Colin Wafer (19); Ian David Whelan (19); Martin Kenneth Wild (29); Kevin Daniel Williams (15); Graham John Wright (17); Andrew Devine (55).)
Bishop James Jones	1948–	19 January 2017	Chairman of the Hillsborough Independent Panel.
Tony McGann		1 July 2017	Chairman of the Eldonians Community Based Housing Association.
BBC Radio Merseyside	1968-	15 March 2018	Local radio
Phil Redmond	1949–	2 November 2018	Television producer and writer
Thomas Williams	1948–	30 September 2021	Auxiliary Bishop of Liverpool.
James Stanley McGovern	1949–	19 March 2022	English Screenwriter and Producer.
Jürgen Klopp	1967–	2 November 2022	German football manager of Liverpool F.C.
Sue Johnston	1943–	19 June 2024	English Actress
