= British Poetry since 1945 =

Poetry anthology

British Poetry since 1945 is a poetry anthology edited by Edward Lucie-Smith, published in 1970 by Penguin Books, with a second and last edition in 1985. The anthology is a careful attempt to take account of the whole span of post-war British poetry, including poets from The Group, a London-centred workshop that Lucie-Smith himself had once been chairman of, following the departure of founder Philip Hobsbaum.

While the first section, "Sources," includes older poets such as Robert Graves, John Betjeman and Dylan Thomas, the second section "New Voices" includes Seamus Heaney, and also Liverpool poets Adrian Henri, Roger McGough and Brian Patten, who at the time were not accepted by mainstream critics (although they were included in the best-selling The Mersey Sound anthology from 1967).

Lucie-Smith wrote in the introduction:

The evidence seems to be in favour of the notion that British poetry is currently in a period of exploration, and that it is not in the thrall of any dominant figure, or even of any dominant literary of political idea. It is for this reason that I have cast my net so wide, and have chosen to represent so many writers.

The first edition of the anthology was reprinted several times. A revised edition appeared in 1985; it omitted some poets and added new ones. The new sections recognised the increasing influence of the Northern Irish and "university" poets.

== Poets in British Poetry since 1945 (first edition) ==
A. Alvarez - Kingsley Amis - George Barker - Patricia Beer - Martin Bell - Francis Berry - John Betjeman - D. M. Black - Thomas Blackburn - Alan Bold - Alan Brownjohn - Basil Bunting - Miles Burrows - Charles Causley - Barry Cole - Tony Connor - Iain Crichton Smith - Peter Dale - Donald Davie - Lawrence Durrell - D. J. Enright - Paul Evans - Ian Hamilton Finlay - Roy Fisher - John Fuller - Roy Fuller - Robert Garioch - David Gascoyne - Karen Gershon - Henry Graham - W. S. Graham - Robert Graves - Harry Guest - Thom Gunn - Michael Hamburger - Ian Hamilton Finlay - Lee Harwood - Spike Hawkins - Seamus Heaney - John Heath-Stubbs - Adrian Henri - Geoffrey Hill - Philip Hobsbaum - Anselm Hollo - Ted Hughes - Elizabeth Jennings - Brian Jones - David Jones - Philip Larkin - Peter Levi - Christopher Logue - Edward Lucie-Smith - George MacBeth - Norman MacCaig - Hugh MacDiarmid - Roger McGough - George Mackay Brown - Louis MacNeice - Barry MacSweeney - Derek Mahon - Matthew Mead - Christopher Middleton - Adrian Mitchell - Dom Moraes - Edwin Morgan - Edwin Muir - Jeff Nuttall - Stewart Parker - Brian Patten - Sylvia Plath - Peter Porter - Tom Raworth - Peter Redgrove - Jon Silkin - Stevie Smith - Bernard Spencer - Jon Stallworthy - Nathaniel Tarn - Dylan Thomas - D. M. Thomas - Anthony Thwaite - Charles Tomlinson - Rosemary Tonks - Gael Turnbull - Vernon Watkins - David Wevill

== Poets in British Poetry since 1945 (second edition) ==
The following poets in the first edition are not in the second edition:

Paul Evans - Spike Hawkins - Anselm Hollo - Barry MacSweeney - Stewart Parker - Rosemary Tonks

The following were added:

David Constantine - Douglas Dunn - James Fenton - Tony Harrison - Michael Longley - Medbh McGuckian - Andrew Motion - Paul Muldoon - Tom Paulin - Craig Raine - Peter Scupham - C. H. Sisson - Ken Smith - David Sweetman - George Szirtes - R. S. Thomas - Kit Wright

== See also ==
- 1970 in poetry
- 1970 in literature
- English poetry
- Irish poetry
- List of poetry anthologies
