= Alan Jackson (poet) =

Scottish poet

Alan Jackson (born 1938) is a Scottish poet.

== Early life and education ==
He was born in Liverpool in 1938, to Scottish parents who returned to Edinburgh in 1940. He attended the Royal High School in Edinburgh (1952–56) and Edinburgh University (1956–59).

== Reading career ==
He began a reading career on Edinburgh Festival fringe in 1960, with the London poets Pete Brown, Mike Horovitz and Libby Houston. In 1965 Jackson founded the yearly series of readings during the Edinburgh Festival in the Traverse Theatre (with Tony Jackson, no relation). These readings became a platform for the Liverpool poets Brian Patten, Adrian Henri and Roger McGough and for the older Scottish poets Edwin Morgan, Robert Garioch and Norman McCaig. Hamish Henderson brought folk singers Pentangle played there, as did The Scaffold. Poets such as Pete Morgan and Pete Roche (editor of the influential 1967 anthology Love Love Love: The New Love Poetry) first appeared at these Traverse readings.

Jackson went on from this time till the early 1970s to give hundreds of readings throughout Britain, often solo, but mostly with Patten, Mitchell, Morgan, Houston and others of the poets mentioned above.

In 1973, Jackson announced that he was retiring from the "reading scene". The time had come he said "to obey the poetry", rather than merely purveying it to others. This move of Jackson’s only makes sense when it is considered that his poetry had never been one of nature description or social anecdote, but had themes of self-inquisition and self-undoing.

Heart of the Sun (published in 1986 by Open Township) has a long introduction entitled "Reasons for the Work", describing his poetic evolution through the years since the decision to "retire". Jackson had always had considerable philosophical and historical interests and a main feature of the introduction is his account of how experiences of his own led him to the work of Rudolf Steiner, the Austrian Christian initiate.

This new phase in Jackson’s life led to the writing of short stories, in italics because they are not so much realist, but have something of the nature of myth and fable. He was also writing ideas pieces, investigating and expressing "the spirit forces" at work in our time.

== Publications ==
He self-published Underwater Wedding in 1961.

In 1968, he was published in Penguin Modern Poets 12, and in 1969 by the avant garde Fulcrum Press (publishers of Ed Dorn and Gary Snyder).

In June 1971 the whole issue of Lines Review 37, the Scottish literary magazine, was devoted to Jackson's essay "The Knitted Claymore", which expressed his conviction that rising nationalist sentiment in Scotland was infiltrating and distorting the realm of literature. As could be expected, the essay was widely welcomed and widely attacked.

A CD of his readings at The Netherbow Arts Centre on the High Street in Edinburgh in 1977/78 is available which are hilarious and sombre in equal measure

== Recognition ==
Jackson's short poem "Young Politician" is to be found carved in the outer wall of the new Scottish Parliament along with quotations from Robert Burns, Walter Scott, Robert Louis Stevenson and Hugh MacDiarmid.

== Selected bibliography ==
- Underwater Wedding, 1961
- Sixpenny poems, 1962
- Well Ye Ken Noo, 1963
- All Fall Down, 1963
- The Worstest Beast, 1965
- Penguin Modern Poets #12, 1968
- The Grim Wayfarer (Fulcrum Press), 1969
- The Knitted Claymore (Lines Review), 1971
- Idiots Are Freelance, 1973
- The Guardians Arrive, 1978
- Star Child, 1984
- To Stand Against The Wind, 1985
- Heart Of The Sun, 1986
- Light Hearts, 1987
- Salutations (Collected Poems), Polygon, 1990
- Dear Avalanche, 1996
