= Merseybeat (disambiguation) =

Merseybeat, or beat music, is a musical genre that originated in Liverpool, England in the 1950s.

Merseybeat, Merseybeats, Mersey Beat, or Mersey Sound may refer to:

- Mersey Beat, a music newspaper
- Merseybeat (TV series), a television series
- The Merseybeats, an English beat band
- The Mersey Sound (anthology), a 1967 anthology of poems by Liverpool poets Roger McGough, Brian Patten, and Adrian Henri

== See also ==
- Liverpool poets, 1960s poets from Liverpool, influenced by 1950s Beat poetry
