= Jim Bennett (poet) =

British writer

Jim Bennett (born 1951 in Liverpool) is a British poet. He performed alongside Roger McGough and Adrian Henri in the late 1960s.

== Early life ==
He was adopted into the Bennett family at 2 years of age. He began writing poetry and short stories in the 1960s and was performing his poetry in O'Connor's Tavern in Liverpool long before he was of age to go in legally. He had several jobs after leaving university but in 1976 gave up working in the conventional sense to pursue a life of writing, lecturing and performing his poetry. Bennett has written freelance journalism, short stories and poetry for the years since.

== Career ==
Bennett left Liverpool in the early 1970s and went on to perform his poetry in the United States. After a period performing as Richard Dripping, which included appearances at punk venues in Liverpool and Manchester. After returning to Liverpool he worked at the University of Liverpool. He used to perform regularly with the Dead Good Poets in the Everyman Bistro.

His lecturing has included creating courses in Transport and Safety Studies, Creative Writing, Media, Journalism, Speculative Writing, Travel Writing and various Poetry Courses, for Universities and other educational organisations. He has written 64 (as of 2011) books ranging from Transport Studies, Children's and Poetry, and in addition has written many songs and had a CD of his poetry and songs released, and many booklets and brochures of his poetry have been produced to tie in with various performances.

Bennett's career as a performance poet has earned him many awards amongst which are three DaDaFest awards, and a Silver Stake from the Manchester Slam. He has also won awards for his poetry including the 2006 Frost Award, and the Fante Award in 2002. In 2005 his book The Man Who Tried to Hug Clouds was voted Best Poetry Book in English at the Berlin Book Festival. He has been nominated five times for a Pushcart Award and has twice won the performance award the San Francisco Beat Festival and was Poetry Superhighway Favourite Poet of the Year 2000.

His poetry has been published widely and Bennett has grasped the internet as a tool for poets and helped create the most visited independent website in the world for poets and writers, Poetry Kit. Poetry Kit was created in 1998 by Ted Slade and Bennett worked with him on developing and editing on-line Poetry magazines until Ted's death in 2004 when he took over as the sole owner and principal editor of the site and its spin off magazines.

In August 2010 Bennett contributed to an eBook collection of political poems entitled Emergency Verse - Poetry in Defence of the Welfare State edited by Alan Morrison

He continues to write, tour and lecture regularly and in recent years has produced a series of internet based poetry courses which receive wide acclaim.

== Biographies ==
- Wade, Stephen (ed.); Gladsongs and Gatherings - Poetry in Liverpool.
- Jaki Florek and Paul Whelan; Liverpool Eric's 2009 Feeedback (sic)

== Bibliography ==
- Cartographer / Heswall - 2012 - Indigo Dreams
- Larkhill - 2009 - Searle Publishing
- The Man Who Tried to Hug Clouds - 1st 2005 reprint 2006 - Bluechrome
- Bold Street - 2008 - Mainstream
- 56 A Life in Pieces - 2008 - Starwood
- Down in Liverpool - 2001 CD spoken word and song - Long Neck Media

Other titles by Jim Bennett Poetry books

Pen Pictures (Starwood - 1992) Abercromby Anthology 1 (ed) (Liverpool University - 1997) Abercromby Anthology 2 (ed) (Liverpool University - 1998) Waiting For The Bone-yard... (allstar - 1985) One More For The Bone-yard (allstar - 1988) Abercromby Anthology 3 (Liverpool University - 1999) Drums at New Brighton (Starwood 1996)

Chapbooks

Clocks (1997) The Green Man of Bidston Moss (2002) Elvis in Liverpool (2003) Made in Liverpool (2004) Never a Crossword (2005) Other Than (2006) 56; A Life in Pieces (2008) A Trip Down Jimgling Lane (2009)
