= Martin Bax =

British consultant paediatrician (1933–2024)

Martin Charles Owen Bax (13 August 1933 – 24 March 2024) was a British consultant paediatrician who founded the arts magazine Ambit in 1959.

== Life ==
Bax was the son of Cyril Bax, a civil servant, and his wife Eleanor Bayne, a teacher, and a grandson of Ernest Belfort Bax. He was educated at Dauntsey's School. He read medicine at New College, Oxford, and became a medical student at Guy's Hospital, graduating in 1961. He went on to become a lecturer there.

Bax organised regular readings in the UK for Ambit magazine and jazz events, presented at various venues in London and elsewhere including The Betsey Trotwood in Clerkenwell, London and Chelsea Arts Club. He edited the medical journal Developmental and Child Neurology from 1978, following the death of Ronald MacKeith. From 1959, Bax, MacKeith, and other members of the "Little Club", named for William John Little, worked on a definition of cerebral palsy. Bax edited and published it in 1964, and it received wide recognition.

Bax lived in London, and was elected a Fellow of the Royal Society of Literature in 2002. He died on 24 March 2024, at the age of 90, and his ashes were interred in Highgate Cemetery.

== Works ==
Bax's first published novel was The Hospital Ship published by Cape and New Directions in 1976. His novel Love on the Borders was published by Seren in 2005. In the 1970s, using text from The Hospital Ship, he developed The Vietnam Symphony with jazz trumpeter Henry Lowther, which was performed at the Institute of Contemporary Arts and subsequently on BBC Radio 3. He also wrote for children, and his book Edmund went Far Away was published in the US and the UK.

== Ambit ==
Since Bax created it, Ambit has published poetry, prose, and artwork from the likes of Fleur Adcock, Peter Porter, Tennessee Williams, J. G. Ballard, Eduardo Paolozzi, and many others. He retired as editor in 2013.
