= City of Liverpool College =

British college, established 1992

The City of Liverpool College

Location
- The Learning Exchange (Main Site); Liverpool, Merseyside, L1 9DW; England; 53°24′03″N 2°58′30″W

Information
- Type: Community
- Established: April 1992
- Department for Education URN: 130487 Tables
- Ofsted: Reports
- Chairperson: Tony Cobain
- Principal: Elaine Bowker
- Gender: Coeducational
- Age: 16+
- Enrolment: 22,000
- Website: www.liv-coll.ac.uk

The City of Liverpool College is a further education and higher education college in Liverpool, England.

The college is located over several sites across the Knowledge Quarter – a district in the Liverpool city centre. Community-based provision has been disestablished in response to reduction in funding provision by central government. ESOL (English for Speakers of Other Languages) courses are likely to be the sole community-based provision.

== History ==
It was created in 1992, as City of Liverpool Community College, from the merger of four further education (FE) colleges in Liverpool, including Millbank College of Commerce. The college left LEA control in 1993, when it was incorporated as Liverpool Community College, under Companies House legislation. The college's first principal was Wally Brown. The college changed its name to The City of Liverpool College in 2013.

== Organisation and administration ==
The board is made up of representatives from local businesses and communities. Funding for The City of Liverpool College is provided through the Education and Skills Funding Agency, and includes a "Local Offer" as required by the Liverpool City Region Combined Authority, as Local Authority under the Children and Families Act.

== College Campus ==
There are four main college centres, all of which are within the City Centre area.

=== The Arts Centre ===
The Arts Centre is the provider of arts teaching within the City of Liverpool College corporation. The college runs both college and university level courses from the college.

Creative Apprenticeships are run at this centre along with courses in:

- Art and Design
- Dance
- Drama
- Musical Theatre
- Events Management
- Fashion
- Graphic Design
- Interactive Design
- Journalism
- Media
- Theatre Technology
- 3D Design
- Music
- Music Technology
- Multimedia
- Photography
- ICT and Digital technologies

HE programmes in Creative and Digital Arts are also run at the Arts Centre.

== Clarence Street ==
Clarence Street centre was opened in 2001. The following courses can be chosen:

- English and Humanities
- GCSEs
- A-levels(not anymore)
- Science
- Access to Science/Health
- Business Studies
- Higher Education Courses
- Teacher Education

== Duke Street ==
Opened in 2003, Duke Street offers the following course types:

- Hospitality and Catering
- Bakery and Confectionery
- Travel, Tourism and Leisure
- Hairdressing and Beauty Therapy
- Holistic and Complementary Therapies
- Makeup Artistry
- English for Speakers of Other Languages
- English as a Foreign Language
- Professional Development

== Vauxhall Road ==
Opened in 2003 at a cost of over £10 million, this centre specialises in construction and engineering. The following course types can be chosen:

- Brickwork
- Plastering
- Joinery
- Building services
- Electrical and gas installation
- Plumbing
- Motor Vehicle Engineering
- Electronic Engineering
- Manufacturing

== The Learning Exchange ==
The £35 million Learning Exchange on Roscoe Street is central to the College's city centre campus and houses all its student support services, including finance, exams and careers advice and guidance.

The Learning Exchange is the location for courses in health care and child studies and Sport, Exercise & Fitness - including Uniformed Services. It is also home to HE programmes in computing and business with accounting.

== Qualifications available ==
The college offers traditional academic qualifications such as GCSEs, as well as vocational courses at national certificate, diploma and higher national level. It also offers programmes at foundation and master's degree level.

On GCSE results day 2026, the decision was announced that first year A-level courses would not take place affecting approximately 80 students and staff. The college attributed the inconvenience to a lack of demand for A-level courses that year, forcing the affected students to pursue alternative options.

The college also provides a range of professional qualifications such as Microsoft Systems Administrator, Microsoft Office Specialist and CISCO CCNA. Students studying these areas may have chosen these as a way to enhance their prior knowledge.

== Awards ==
Several awards have been won by students and staff alike for their involvement in the local area.

- Clatterbridge Cancer Centre NHS Foundation Trust and the College won the HSJ Patient Safety Award for Virtual or Remote Care Initiative of the Year for an innovation patient video.
- One of the college's staff, Christopher Butler, who was involved in the HSJ Award, is nominated for Innovator of the Year in the Liverpool City Region Culture and Creativity Awards.

== See also ==
- Liverpool Knowledge Quarter
