= Wally Brown (educator) =

British academic administrator

Wally Brown, CBE DL was Principal of Liverpool Community College from its creation in 1992 until his retirement in 2008. Born in Toxteth, Liverpool, Brown was previously Head of Community Education in Lambeth, and an adult education manager in Manchester.

At the time of the Toxteth riots, in 1981, Brown was living locally, was Chair of the Community Relations Council, and acted as a mediator between the police and the local community.

Brown was appointed CBE in 2001. In 2012, he was made a Freeman of the City of Liverpool for his services to education in the city and in 2014 he was made an Honorary Doctor of Education by Edge Hill University. In 2015 he was appointed a Deputy Lieutenant of Merseyside. In 2023 Brown published Wally Brown: A Life - Born and Raised in Liverpool 8, with a foreword by Professor Stephen Small (UC Berkeley) with Writing on the Wall.
