= Ambit (magazine) =

Literary magazine

- Issue 230 of Ambit
- Categories: Literary magazine
- Frequency: Quarterly
- Format: A4
- Founder: Martin Bax
- Founded: 1959; 67 years ago
- First issue: 1959; 67 years ago
- Final issue Number: April 2023; 3 years ago 249
- Country: United Kingdom
- Based in: London
- Language: English
- Website: www.ambitmagazine.co.uk
- ISSN: 0002-6972
- OCLC: 1369005155

Ambit was a quarterly literary periodical published in the United Kingdom. The magazine was founded in 1959 by Martin Bax, a London novelist and consultant paediatrician.

With its first 32 page issue published the Summer of 1959, the magazine united art, fiction, poetry and reviews. Distributed internationally, the magazine appeared quarterly until going on indefinite hiatus in April 2023. Notable Ambit contributors have included J. G. Ballard, Edwin Brock, Eduardo Paolozzi, Ralph Steadman, Lionel Kearns, Stevie Smith, Henry Graham, Peter Porter, Carol Ann Duffy, Fleur Adcock, Carole Satyamurti, Julia Casterton, Peter Blake, and David Hockney, to name but a few. Despite the wealth of recognisable names, Ambit also featured the work of new, unpublished writers.

In the 1960s Ambit became well known for testing the boundaries and social conventions, and published many anti-establishment pieces, including an issue with works written under the influence of drugs. Edwin Brock was poetry editor, and J. G. Ballard became fiction editor alongside, later, Geoff Nicholson. Henry Graham and Carol Ann Duffy joined Edwin Brock as poetry editors. Michael Foreman was art editor for 50 years. Across the magazine's history, Derek Birdsall (Omnific), Alan Kitching, John Morgan Studio and Stephen Barrett were notable designers.

In 2013, poet Briony Bax (daughter of the poet Adrian Mitchell) became editor, successfully transitioning Ambit to gain charitable status, with the intention to continue Ambit's mission of using art and literature to expand upon the times. Former co-editor with Martin Bax, Kate Pemberton, became fiction editor (until 2022), with poetry editors including Declan Ryan and Ralf Webb, and Olivia Bax and Jean-Philippe Dordolo as art editors. The magazine held launches at the Tate Modern Gallery and was a regular in Soho, although much of the legacy of Ambit began at the Chelsea Arts Club. After seven years, Briony Bax became editor emeritus, having recruited author, poet and performer, Kirsty Allison (who was first published in Ambit in 2007) first as managing editor, then as editor.

Kirsty Allison introduced Lias Saoudi (Fat White Family) as a guest editor for the first Ambit Pop issue, Ambit 243, which invited him to commission and expand on the Poems, Stories and Art legacy of Ambit. This issue published Rob Doyle, Jenni Fagan, Ben Myers, Wayne Horse, Neal Fox (Le Gun), Zaffar Kunial and more. The Art Editor was Mireille Fauchon, who introduced Stephen Barrett as designer (Stephen Barrett also designed Kirsty Allison's debut novel, Psychomachia (Wrecking Ball Press).

Ambit was in continuous publication from 1959 to 2023. In this time, the magazine was the proud publisher of thousands of poets, fiction writers and artists. Despite this, Ambit remained a small enterprise with many volunteers and sparse resources but with an intense commitment to the work. Due to unwelcome financing factors including the loss of its archive sale and the death of a major patron, Ambit had to close its doors in April 2023. Ambit 249 (Magick) was its last issue.

== Review ==
Ambit magazine was described by artist Ralph Steadman as "a surreptitious peek inside a private world. Without it such vital sparks of inspiration could well be lost forever." The magazine professes not to include in its publication criticisms, essays, articles and lengthy reviews but prefers including real work, the likes and dislikes associated with the readers, creating never a dull moment and always sparking off feedbacks. To quote Carol Ann Duffy, "Ambit continues to surprise, exasperate and delight". Ambit ran as a quarterly from unsolicited, previously unpublished poetry and short fiction submissions, latterly as skinnier issues with guest editors, such as Savage Pencil, or showcasing winners of the Annual Ambit Awards for Poems, Stories and Art. Following the presentation of "the War issue" 248, the final issue of Ambit 249 carried the theme of Magick with more submissions than ever received before. Following the loss of several patrons, "the most stolen magazine from Harvard Library" was put into hiatus by the board, closing as a charity on 28 April 2023.

== Editors ==
- Martin Bax
- Micheal Foreman
- Edwin Brock
- J. G. Ballard
- Henry Graham
- Geoff Nicholson
- Carol Ann Duffy
- Julia Casterton
- Kate Pemberton
- Declan Ryan
- Liz Berry
- Briony Bax
- Olivia Bax
- Jean-Philippe Dordolo
- Mike Smith
- Gary Budden
- Ralf Webb
- George Jackson
- Imogen Cassels
- Rob Newton
- Andre Naffis-Sahely
- Jade Cuttle
- Mireille Fauchon
- Mathis Clement
- Gwendolen MacKeith
- George Laver
- Romalyn Ante
- Kostya Tsolakis
- Kirsty Allison
