= David Macleod Black =

Scottish poet and psychoanalyst

David Macleod Black (born 8 November 1941) is a South African-born Scottish poet and psychoanalyst. He is author of six collections of poetry and is included in British Poetry since 1945, Emergency Kit (Faber), Wild Reckoning (Calouste Gulbenkian), Twentieth Century Scottish Poetry (Faber) and many other anthologies. As a psychoanalyst he has published many professional papers, an edited volume on psychoanalysis and religion, and a collection of essays relating to values and science.

== Life ==
David Black was born in South Africa in 1941, and lived in Malawi and Tanzania before moving to Scotland in 1950. After leaving school he spent a year in France before going to Edinburgh University, where he studied Philosophy. Later he studied Buddhism and Hinduism under Ninian Smart at Lancaster. While at Edinburgh he met the Scottish poet Robert Garioch, who became a lasting influence and inspiration. In the late 1960s he lived in London and taught philosophy and literature at Chelsea School of Art, where he met the American poet Martha Kapos and the painters Ken Kiff and John McLean, who became lifelong friends.

Following six months teaching in Japan, and a year at the Findhorn Foundation on the Moray Firth, Black trained in psychotherapy first at the Westminster Pastoral Foundation (WPF) and later with the British Psychoanalytical Society/Institute of Psychoanalysis. After the unexpected death in 1980 of WPF's founder, William Kyle, Black chaired the executive committee for a year until the appointment of the new Director, Derek Blows. Later he worked for many years as a psychoanalyst in London. Retired since 2016, he is a Fellow and former Hon Secretary of the British Psychoanalytical Society. He is married to Juliet Newbigin and lives in London and Wiltshire.

== Career ==
As a poet, under the name D. M. Black, he was at his most prolific in the 1960s and 70s, publishing With Decorum (1967), The Educators (1969), The Happy Crow (1974) and Gravitations (1979). Much of this early poetry was narrative, initially surrealist but becoming increasingly "psychological" as time went on. The last of these early collections, Gravitations, consisted largely of three long narrative poems, two of them written in a hendecasyllabic metre derived from Algernon Swinburne. During this period Black's work also appeared in Penguin Modern Poets 11 (1968) and Edward Lucie-Smith's Penguin anthology, British Poetry since 1945, and in many other places, and was widely commented on in Scottish contexts, for example in Robin Fulton's Contemporary Scottish Poetry (1974) and in reviews by Anne Stevenson (Lines Review 69, 1979) and Andrew Greig (Akros 16:46, 1981). In 1991 Polygon published his Collected Poems 1964-77with an introduction by the translator of Osip Mandelstam. Since then Black has published a collection of translations of poems by Johann Wolfgang von Goethe, Love As Landscape Painter (Fras 2006) and two further original collections, Claiming Kindred (Arc 2011) and The Arrow-maker (Arc 2017). In 2021 NYRB Classics published his translation and commentary on Dante's Purgatorio. (This translation won the 2022 National Translation Award in Poetry, organised by the American Literary Translators Association.)

Under a different form of his name, David M. Black, his psychoanalytic papers have appeared in the International Journal of Psychoanalysis, British Journal of Psychotherapy, Journal of Consciousness Studies and elsewhere. In 1991 he authored the official early history of the Westminster Pastoral Foundation, A Place For Exploration (WPF). In 2006 he edited Psychoanalysis and Religion in the 21st Century: competitors or collaborators? (Routledge) and in 2011 published a collection of original papers, Why Things Matter: the place of values in science, psychoanalysis, and religion(Routledge).

While at Edinburgh University in the 1960s, Black edited the poetry magazine Extra Verse, and in the early 2000s he was a regular reviewer of poetry for the journal Poetry London. He has written uncollected articles on many Scottish poets, Robert Garioch, George MacBeth, Hugh MacDiarmid, Ian Hamilton Finlay and Edwin Morgan. He has written with particular admiration about the work of the American poet, Richard Wilbur.

== Works ==
=== Poetry ===
- The Rocklestrakes (1960)
- From the Mountain (1963)
- Theory of Diet (1966)
- With Decorum (1967)
- A Dozen Short Poems (1968)
- Penguin Modern Poets 11 (with Peter Redgrove and D.M. Thomas) (1968)
- The Educators (1969)
- The Old Hag (1972)
- The Happy Crow (1974)
- Gravitations (1979)
- Collected Poems 1964-87 (1991)
- Claiming Kindred (2011)
- The Arrow-maker (2017)
- The Bi-Plane (2017)

=== Translations ===
- Love as Landscape Painter: selected poems [of J. W. von Goethe] (2006)
- Purgatorio, by Dante Alighieri (2021)
- Paradiso, by Dante Alighieri (2025)

== Reviews ==
- Relich, Mario (1975), review of Happy Crow, in Calgacus 1, Winter 1975, p. 58 & 59, ISSN 0307-2029

== Sources ==
- Official Website of D M Black
- D M Black at the Scottish Poetry Library
