= Liverpool poets =

1960s English poets influenced by Beat poetry

The Liverpool poets are a number of influential 1960s poets from Liverpool, England, influenced by 1950s Beat poetry.

Their work is characterised by its directness of expression, simplicity of language, suitability for live performance and concern for contemporary subjects and references. There is often humour, but the full range of human experience and emotion is addressed.

The kids didn't see this poetry with a capital p, they understood it as modern entertainment, as part of the pop-movement. (Roger McGough)

== Poets ==
The poets most commonly associated with this label are Adrian Henri, Roger McGough and Brian Patten. They were featured in a 1967 book The Liverpool Scene edited by Edward Lucie-Smith, with a blurb by Ginsberg and published by Donald Carroll.

Although he was born in Sussex, Adrian Mitchell shared many of the concerns of the Liverpool poets and is often linked with them in critical discussion.

Other related poets include the Londoner Pete Brown (who wrote lyrics for Cream), Pete Morgan and Alan Jackson (both associated with the 1960s Edinburgh poetry scene), Tom Pickard and Barry MacSweeney (both from Newcastle), Spike Hawkins, Jim Bennett, Heather Holden, Mike Evans, Pete Roche and Henry Graham.

The poets generally came from a working-class background and went to art college rather than university. There was a strong allegiance with pop music, and the values and effectiveness of that in reaching out to a wide audience informed the poetry. Readings took place in a pub or club environment.

== The Mersey Sound ==
The anthology The Mersey Sound was published by Penguin in 1967, containing the poems of Adrian Henri, Roger McGough and Brian Patten, and has remained in print ever since, selling in excess of 500,000 copies. It brought the three poets to "considerable acclaim and critical fame", and has been widely influential. In 2002 they were given the Freedom of the City of Liverpool.

== Bands ==
=== The Liverpool Scene ===
The Liverpool Scene was a poetry band, which included Adrian Henri, Andy Roberts, Mike Evans, Mike Hart, Percy Jones and Brian Dodson. It grew out of the success of The Incredible New Liverpool Scene, a CBS LP featuring Henri and McGough reading their work, with accompaniment by the guitarist Roberts. Liverpool DJ John Peel, who was then working on the pirate radio station Radio London, picked up on the LP and featured it on his influential late-night Perfumed Garden show. After Radio London closed down, Peel visited Liverpool and met the band; as a consequence, they were featured in session on his BBC Top Gear and Night Ride shows, and in 1968 he produced their first LP. Four LPs were issued with Henri's poetry heavily featured.

Despite Peel's support the albums achieved little success, although the band did become popular on the UK university and college circuit. Their public performances included a 1969 tour when they opened for Led Zeppelin; they also toured the US but did not attract much acclaim from US critics and audiences. Henri was described in performance as "bouncing thunderously and at risk to audience and fellow performers, the stage vibrating out of rhythm beneath him."

The albums were:

- The Incredible New Liverpool Scene (CBS 1967)
- Amazing Adventures of (RCA 1968)
- Bread on the Night (RCA 1969)
- St. Adrian & Co., Broadway and 3rd (RCA 1970)
- Heirloon (RCA 1971)
- Recollections (Charisma 1972)

There were at least three "best of" albums and a single "Love Is" / "Woo-Woo".

=== The Scaffold ===
The best-known band to emerge was The Scaffold (1963–1974), which featured John Gorman, Mike McCartney (brother of Paul McCartney) and Roger McGough. Initially Adrian Henri was a member, when they were known as The Liverpool, One Fat Lady, All Electric Show. ("One Fat Lady" is the bingo term for 8, and they mostly lived in the Liverpool 8 district.)

In January 1968 Thank U Very Much (sung with a Liverpool accent) reached number 4 in the charts. A year later Lily the Pink reached number 1. Ringo Starr's bass drum was used; also featured were Jack Bruce from Cream, Graham Nash from The Hollies and Reg Dwight, later renaming himself Elton John. Both hits were in the spirit of cheery and humorous drinking songs.

=== Grimms ===
A touring and recording ensemble, Grimms (1971–76), contained an ever-changing cast of Adrian Henri, Brian Patten, Roger McGough, John Gorman, Mike McGear (McCartney), George "Zoot" Money, Neil Innes, Vivian Stanshall, Michael Giles, Kate Robbins, John Megginson, Andy Roberts, David Richards, Peter "Ollie" Halsall, Norman Smedles, Brian Jones, Ritchie Routledge, Valerie Movie, Gerry Conway, Pete Tatters and Timmy Donald (amongst many others).

== Criticism ==
=== For ===
S.N. Radhika Lakshmi observes "the Liverpool poets' approach to poetry differs from that of other poets in that they consistently give the impression of being real people getting to grips with real and pressing situations." She continues:

Like the French Symbolists, Baudelaire and Rimbaud, 'The Liverpool poets' believe that the effect that a poem produces is more important than the poem itself; a poem should be considered as an 'agent' (that conveys the poet's message), rather than as an 'object'. The poetry of 'The Liverpool poets' is also characterized by the undercurrent of sarcasm, irony and pungent wit, which runs through many of their poems. They are also noted for their directness of expression, simplicity of style, and, (in the manner of Robert Frost), their deft handling of complicated ideas in uncomplicated language.

Adrian Henri was described by Lucie-Smith as "the theoretician of the group" and asserted the need to be in touch with contemporary life, following T. S. Eliot's dictum "to purify the dialect of the tribe" and pointing out that his tribe included everyone from motor-bike specialists through consultant gynaecologists and Beatles fans to admen and peeping toms. His conclusion was:

the whole post-Gutenberg galaxy of expanding communications can become the subject-matter of the poet, it's just that most poets are afraid to face up to the consequences of it."

=== Against ===
The emergence of the Liverpool poets as pioneers of "pop poetry" in the UK engendered hostility from the literary establishment. Ian Hamilton said:

A lot was going on that we were in opposition to: there was the Group; there was pop poetry; there was the Liverpool Scene. And when Lucie-Smith, arch-organiser of the Group, went off and edited a book called The Liverpool Scene, praising those people to the skies we thought: 'Treasonable clerk. This is the sort of thing you'd expect from these corrupt, opportunistic, careerist-type figures.' So we went at them. As for nurturing talent, the talent that was around we... nurtured.

Al Alvarez wrote about "the fashion for the diluted near-verse designed for mass readings and poetry-and-jazz concerts", linking it with pop lyrics as "the logic of a traditional form at its weariest", scolding "the poet resigns his responsibilities" and concluding, "what he offers is not poetry", a criticism remarkably similar to that made by F. Dalton in The Times Literary Supplement, on 31 June 1917 about "The Love Song of J. Alfred Prufrock": "The fact that these things occurred to the mind of Mr. Eliot is surely of the very smallest importance to anyone, even to himself. They certainly have no relation to poetry...".

== Legacy ==
Alan Bleasdale said, "The poetry of Henri, Patten and McGough has stayed with me for 35 years. The beauty is its accessibility."

Roger McGough in a 2019 interview said, "I like to think that young poets on Merseyside will see me as one of their own, a poet they can get along with."

== See also ==
- The Mersey Sound (book)
- British Poetry since 1945
- English poetry
- Culture of Liverpool
- Merseybeat
