= Liverpool Shakespeare Festival =

The Liverpool Shakespeare Festival is an annual celebration of the works of William Shakespeare produced by the Lodestar Theatre Company. Originally centered on Liverpool Cathedral, each summer sees different plays performed in various exciting venues – some by the festival's organisers and others by visiting companies.

== Festival history ==
=== 2007 ===
The festival's first production, Macbeth, played from 16 August to 8 September 2007. The first half was staged inside Liverpool Catholic Cathedral, the second half in St James Cemetery. The production was very well received, the cast and direction lauded by most critics, although the production received some criticism as a result of the cathedral's disadvantageous acoustics).

=== 2008 ===
To coincide with Liverpool's year as European Capital of Culture, 2008's festival is broader than previously. On their first visit to Liverpool, Shakespeare's Globe Theatre's perform The Winter's Tale in Liverpool Cathedral and St James Cemetery in August. The festival also includes open air cinema nights and of course, the main event: Lodestar's production of A Midsummer Night's Dream, performed from 13 August to 7 September entirely within St. James' Cemetery.

The production received excellent reviews: 'Wonderful. . .outstanding . . .faultless!' (Liverpool Confidential) "a group that has seemed to gel incredibly well to produce a fantastic ensemble piece".

=== 2009 ===
In 2009, Lodestar presented a double bill: Hamlet at St George's Hall, Liverpool, and Rosencrantz & Guildenstern are Dead by Tom Stoppard at Novas Contemporary Urban Centre. Both plays were, for the first time in U.K., performed by the same company of actors and the festival won a Liverpool Daily Post Arts award.

=== 2010 ===
The 2010 festival was postponed due to a lack of confirmed funding. But returned in 2011 with the planned production of Romeo & Juliet at St George's Hall.

=== 2011 ===
The Liverpool Shakespeare Festival returns! In 2011, events will include a new production of Romeo & Juliet, Three community-led pieces created by 150 local residents with professional artists, and a theatrical experiment: 'Come and have a go if you think you're BARD enough' in which 100 actors will do battle in a unique production of 'Richard 3'.

Performances take place in the concert rooms at St George's Hall, Liverpool between 25 August – 11 September.
