= Liverpool's Dream =

2018 performance art event in Liverpool, England

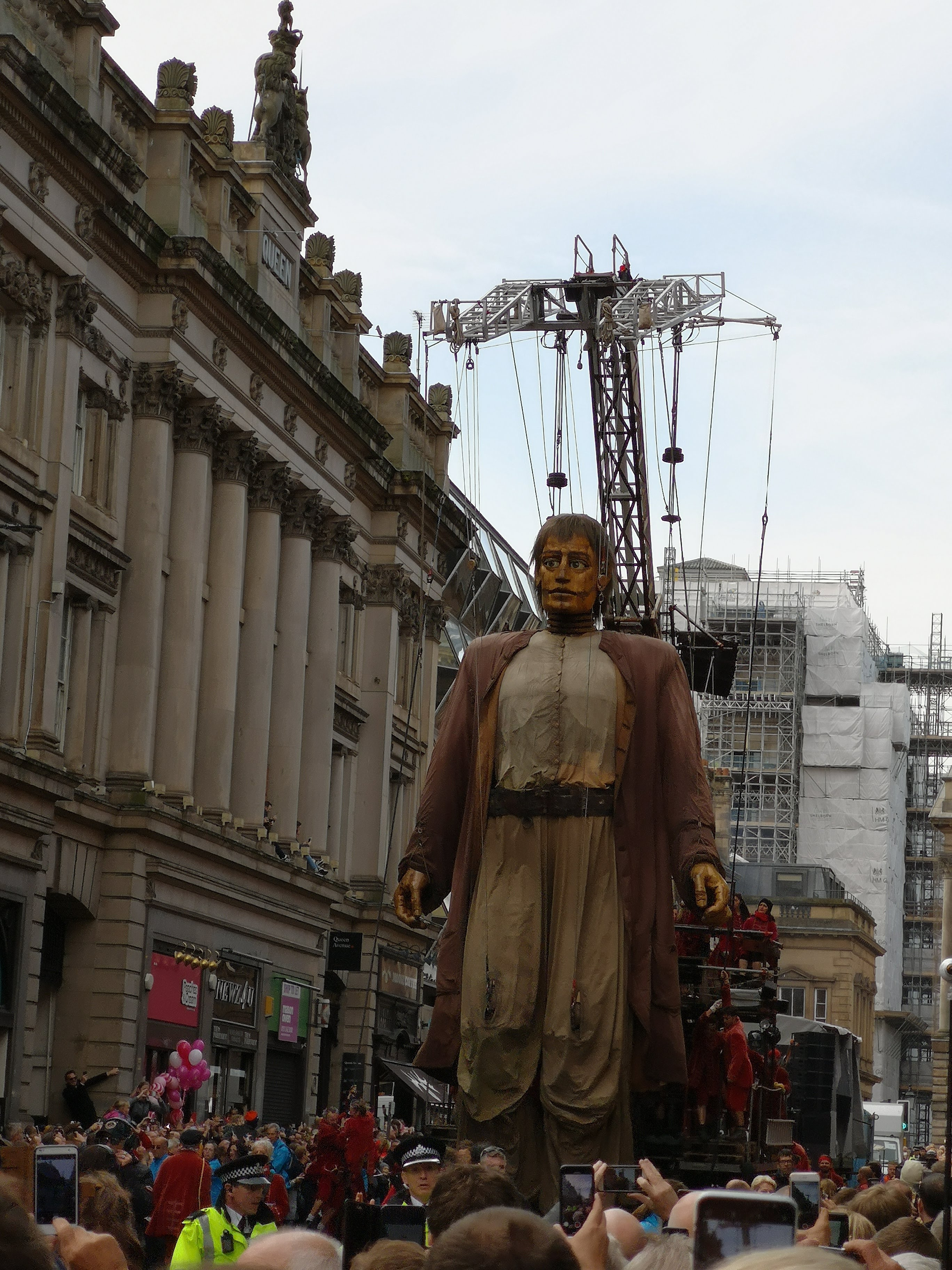
Royal de Luxe's Big Giant parades along Liverpool's Dale Street

Liverpool’s Dream was a three-day outdoor performance art event featuring giant marionettes, that took place in Liverpool, England, from 5 to 7 October 2018. The event attracted more than a million visitors to the city and was, in part, a celebration of the 10th anniversary of Liverpool’s year as European Capital of Culture in 2008. It was billed as being the last appearance of the giants and the final show of the ‘Giants Trilogy’ after Sea Odyssey and Memories of August 1914.

== Company & Cast ==
The performance was designed and performed by Royal de Luxe who are based in Nantes, France, alongside locally-recruited participants and volunteers. The performance featured four giant marionettes. A Little Boy and Little Girl giant, an adult giant (the "Castaway") and Xolo the dog. The Little Boy Giant first appeared in a performance in Cameroon and was 6 m (20 ft) high and required 27 People to operate. The Giant Man was 10 m (33 ft) high and required 44 operators. The Little Girl Giant appeared in the previous two Liverpool giant events was not originally billed as being part of the performance but was revealed as a surprise on the Sunday afternoon. Xolo the dog had appeared in the previous two Liverpool Giants performances. The Giants collectively covered a distance of 21 miles (34 km) across Liverpool and, for the first time in such an event across the river Mersey in New Brighton.

In September 2018 Jean-Luc Courcoult, the artistic director of the company stated that this would be the final performance involving the marionette giants and that they were working on a performance based around a giant silverback gorilla.

== Security ==
As part of Project Servator specially trained police, both visibly armed and covert, were deployed at the event. Project Servator employs tactics such as behavioural detection officers, automatic number plate recognition and CCTV. Merseyside Police stated that previous giants events had not been policed in such a manner.
