= Ceri Hand Gallery =

Former art gallery in London, England

Coordinates: 51.5031°N 0.0973°W

The Ceri Hand Gallery was a commercial contemporary art gallery based in London, England. It opened in Liverpool in July 2008 and relocated to 71 Monmouth Street, Covent Garden, London, WC2 in June 2012, later moving to 6 Copperfield Street, London, SE1 in 2013. The gallery closed on 30 April 2014.

The gallery was named as one of the Top 500 Galleries in the World by Blouin Artinfo and Modern Painters magazine in 2013.

The gallery showed up to ten contemporary art exhibitions per year, providing artists with opportunities to develop their ideas and new bodies of work, in solo and group shows.

The exhibitions programme included represented artists alongside emerging and mid-career international artists. The gallery aimed to support artists through publishing, commissioning new work on and off-site, attending art fairs and securing them opportunities at other galleries.
