= Henry Graham (poet) =

British poet (1930–2019)

Henry Graham (born 1 December 1930 in Liverpool - 20 March 2019) was a British poet. Educated at the Liverpool College of Art in the early 1950s, he was part of the Liverpool poetry scene in the 1960s, and was one of the poetry editors of the British literary magazine Ambit. Graham was a lecturer in Art at The John Moores University for many years and his most recent book of poems was published in 2002 by Driftwood Publications on Merseyside. His achievements were noted by the award of Arts Council Literature Awards in 1969, 1971 and 1975.

== Publications ==
- Kafka in Liverpool (2002)
- Bar Room Ballads (1999)
- The Eye of the Beholder (1997)
- The Very Fragrant Death of Paul Gauguin (1987)
- Bomb (1985)
- Europe After Rain (1981)
- Poker in Paradise Lost (with Jim Mangnall) (1977)
- Passport to Earth (1971)
- Good Luck to You, Kafka/You Need It, Boss (1969)
- Soup City Zoo (with Jim Mangnall) (1968)
