= Brian Patten =

English poet (1946–2025)

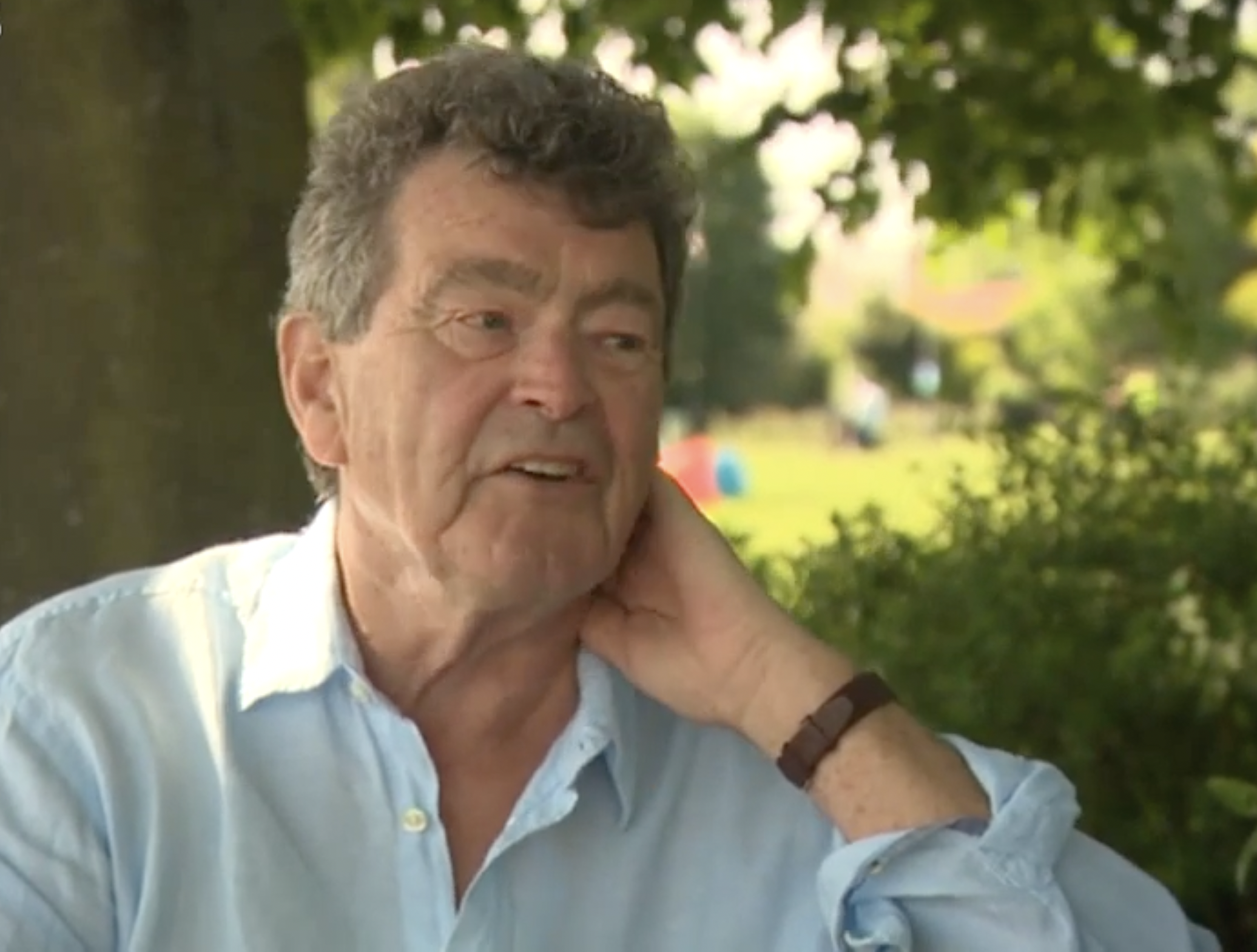
- Patten in 2018
- Born: 7 February 1946; Bootle, Lancashire, England
- Died: 29 September 2025 (aged 79); Torbay, Devon, England
- Occupation: Poet
- Spouse: Linda Cookson
- Writing career
- Notable awards: Eric Gregory Award (1967); Cholmondeley Award (2002)
- Website: brianpatten.co.uk

Brian Patten (7 February 1946 – 29 September 2025) was an English poet and author. He came to prominence in the 1960s as one of the Liverpool poets, and wrote primarily lyrical poetry about human relationships. His famous works included Little Johnny's Confession, The Irrelevant Song, Vanishing Trick, Emma's Doll, and Impossible Parents.

== Life ==
Patten was born in Bootle, Lancashire, on 7 February 1946, to Arthur and Stella Patten. His parents separated shortly after, and he went to live with his grandparents in Wavertree, south Liverpool. He was schooled at Sefton Park Secondary Modern in the Smithdown Road area, where his early poetic writing was encouraged. He left school at 15 and began work for The Bootle Times writing a column on popular music. At the age of 18, he moved to Paris, France, where he lived rough for a time, earning money by writing poems in chalk on the pavements.

Together with another two Liverpool poets, Roger McGough and Adrian Henri, Patten published The Mersey Sound in 1967. One of the best-selling poetry anthologies of modern times, The Mersey Sound aimed to make poetry accessible to a broader audience. It has been described as "the most significant anthology of the twentieth century".

Together with Henri and McGough, Patten was awarded the Freedom of the City of Liverpool in 2001. He received the Cholmondeley Award for poetry in 2002, and he was elected a Fellow of the Royal Society of Literature in 2003.

From 1970 to 1975, Patten was in a relationship with Mary Moore, the daughter of artist Henry Moore; his collection The Irrelevant Song is dedicated to her. From 1994 he was in a lasting and committed relationship with travel writer Linda Cookson, to whom he dedicated several books and a series of love poems. The pair married in 2015 and lived in Dittisham, Devon. She was by his bedside at his death.

Patten died in Torbay, Devon, on 29 September 2025, at the age of 79.

== Work ==
Patten's first published solo volumes of poems were Little Johnny's Confession (1967), Notes to the Hurrying Man (1969) and The Irrelevant Song (1971). In 1972 he was featured alongside Libby Houston, Gillian Barron, Spike Hawkins, Heather Holden, Alan Jackson and Ted Milton in The Old Pals' Act, edited by Pete Brown. Patten's next published works were Vanishing Trick (1976) and Grave Gossip (1979). In 1983, along with McGough and Henri, he published New Volume, a follow-up to The Mersey Sound. Patten's later solo collections, Storm Damage (1988) and Armada (1996), are more varied, the latter featuring a sequence of poems concerning the death of his mother and memories of his childhood. Armada is perhaps Patten's most mature and formal book, dispensing with much of the playfulness of former work. He has also written comic verse for children, notably Gargling With Jelly and Thawing Frozen Frogs.

Patten's style is generally lyrical and his subjects are primarily love and relationships. His 1986 collection Love Poems draws together his best work in this area from the previous sixteen years. Charles Causley commented that he "reveals a sensibility profoundly aware of the ever-present possibility of the magical and the miraculous, as well as of the granite-hard realities. These are undiluted poems, beautifully calculated, informed – even in their darkest moments – with courage and hope."

The actor Paul Bettany, in his contribution to the poetry collection Poems That Make Grown Men Cry (2014), said of Patten's work: "Reading Brian Patten's poetry does that trick that art should do, which is to sort of adhere you to the surface of the planet, just long enough that you don't go spinning off into the loneliness of space – 'Somebody else has felt this too', you think. And you breathe a little easier."

Patten's poem "So Many Different Lengths of Time" has, in recent times, become a popular poem recited at funerals. At the service to remember Ken Dodd in Liverpool's Anglican Cathedral, the actor Stephanie Cole read "So Many Different Lengths of Time" to a congregation of thousands within and outside the building. Opening his poem with verse by Pablo Neruda, Patten's poem argues that it is the act of remembrance which offers family members the best antidote to the anguish of loss. In tackling the subject of grief, Patten views poetry as performing an important social function: "Poetry helps us understand what we've forgotten to remember. It reminds us of things that are important to us when the world overtakes us emotionally."

== Selected bibliography ==
=== Publications with others ===
- The Mersey Sound, 1967, ISBN 978-0141189260
- The Old Pals' Act, 1972, ISBN 978-0850310153
- New Volume, 1983, ISBN 978-0140423198
- The Drifted Stream, 2024, ISBN 978-1916938700

=== Poetry collections for adults ===
- Little Johnny's Confession, 1967, ISBN 978-0048210135
- Notes to the Hurrying Man, 1969
- When You Wake Tomorrow, illustrated by Pip Benveniste, 1971
- The Irrelevant Song, 1971
- And Sometimes It Happens, 1972
- Vanishing Trick, 1976, ISBN 978-0048210388
- Grave Gossip, 1979
- Love Poems (anthology), 1986, ISBN 978-0586092057
- Storm Damage, 1988, ISBN 978-0006547709
- Grinning Jack (anthology), 1992
- Armada, 1996, ISBN 978-0007333752
- Selected Poems (anthology), 2007, ISBN 978-0141027135
- Collected Love Poems (anthology), 2007, ISBN 978-0007246496
- The Book of Upside Down Thinking, 2018, ISBN 978-1907860102

=== Books for children ===
- The Elephant and the Flower, 1970, ISBN 978-0048230928
- Jumping Mouse, 1972, ISBN 978-1903458990
- Emma's Doll, 1976, ISBN 978-0140562453
- Gargling With Jelly, 1985, ISBN 978-0670806447, 2015 reissue ISBN 978-0141316505
- Mr Moon's Last Case, 1988, ISBN 978-0140327144
- Thawing Frozen Frogs, 1992, ISBN 978-1847802699
- Impossible Parents, illustrated by Arthur Robins, Walker Books, 1994, OCLC 31708253, ISBN 978-1406306132
- Jimmy Tag-Along, 1995
- The Blue and Green Ark: An Alphabet For Planet Earth, 1999, ISBN 978-0439079693
- Juggling With Gerbils, 2000, ISBN 978-0141304786
- The Impossible Parents Go Green, illus. Robins, Walker Books, 2001, ISBN 978-0744559545
- The Story Giant, 2004, ISBN 978-0007119431
- The Most Impossible Parents, illus. Robins, Walker Books, 2010, ISBN 978-1406321869

=== As editor ===
- The Puffin Book of Utterly Brilliant Poetry, 1998, ISBN 978-0140384215
- The Puffin Book of Modern Children's Verse, 2006

=== Recordings ===
- Brian Patten: Reading His Poetry, Caedmon Records, Inc., 1969
