= Roger McGough =

English poet and performer (b. 1937)

Roger McGough CBE FRSL
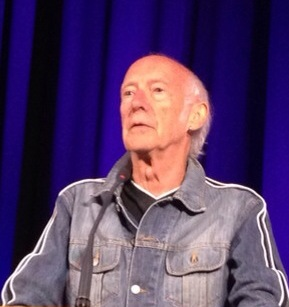
- Born: Roger Joseph McGough; 9 November 1937 (age 88); Litherland, Lancashire, England
- Education: University of Hull
- Occupations: Poet; broadcaster; writer; children's author; playwright
- Writing career
- Language: English
- Notable work: The Mersey Sound 1967
- Notable awards: OBE 1997; CBE 2004; Cholmondeley Award 1998
- Movement: Liverpool poets
- Website: rogermcgough.org

Roger Joseph McGough CBE FRSL (/məˈɡɒf/; born 9 November 1937) is an English poet, performance poet, broadcaster, children's author and playwright. He presents the BBC Radio 4 programme Poetry Please, as well as performing his own poetry. McGough was one of the leading members of the Liverpool poets, a group of young poets influenced by Beat poetry and the popular music and culture of 1960s Liverpool. He is an honorary fellow of Liverpool John Moores University, a fellow of the Royal Society of Literature and President of the Poetry Society.

== Early life ==
McGough was born in Litherland, Lancashire, on the outskirts of Liverpool, to Roger Francis, a docker, and Mary (McGarry) McGough. His ancestry is Irish and he was raised in the Roman Catholic faith. He was a pupil at St Mary's College in Crosby, before going on to study French and Geography at the University of Hull. McGough lived in one of the university residences, Needler Hall, for three years from 1955 and served as hall librarian. Contemporaneously, the poet Philip Larkin became the university's librarian; newly arrived at Hull, he served as a sub-warden at Needler Hall, though he lived in private accommodation nearby. Several years later McGough corresponded with Larkin about poetry, sending him some of his own poems as he still lacked the confidence to approach the man directly. Larkin replied, thanking McGough for the poetry, which he had enjoyed reading. He added that he believed that McGough walked an impressionistic tightrope which, though exhilarating, meant that on occasion he fell off.

== The Scaffold and GRIMMS ==
Returning to Merseyside in the early 1960s, McGough worked as a French teacher and, with John Gorman, organised arts events. McGough and Gorman later met Mike McGear (Mike McCartney) and together formed the trio The Scaffold; they worked the Edinburgh Festival Fringe until they were signed to Parlophone records in 1966. The Scaffold performed a mixture of comic songs, comedy sketches and the poetry of McGough. The group scored several hit records, reaching number one in the UK Singles Chart in 1968 with their version of "Lily the Pink". McGough wrote the lyrics for many of the group's songs and also recorded the musical comedy/poetry album McGough and McGear.

In 1971 GRIMMS was formed, originally as a merger of the Scaffold, the Bonzo Dog Band and the Liverpool Scene. Group member Neil Innes said about the formation of the group: "I don't know what attracted the Scaffold to the Bonzos; we were incredibly anarchic, which was probably something shared by the Scaffold as well."

== Poetry ==
As a poet, McGough came to national prominence through the publication of The Mersey Sound in 1967. The Mersey Sound is an anthology of poetry by three Liverpool poets: McGough, Brian Patten, and Adrian Henri. It went on to sell more than 500,000 copies, becoming one of the bestselling poetry anthologies of all time; remaining in continuous publication, it was revised in 1983 and again in 2007. The title of the anthology was a conscious association of the three Liverpool poets with the musical phenomenon caused by the eruption of the Beatles and associated bands from the same city, known collectively as the "Merseybeat", on the world. McGough's personal connection with the Beatles was referenced in a much later comic poem, "To Macca's Trousers", contained in the book That Awkward Age (2009). McGough discovered a long forgotten pair of Paul McCartney's blue mohair trousers in his attic; the trousers had been given to him, via McCartney's brother Mike, in the early 1960s.

Let me die a youngman's death
not a free from sin tiptoe in
candlewax & waning death
not a curtains drawn by angels borne
'what a nice way to go' death

— from "Let Me Die a Youngman's Death" (1967),
The Mersey Sound

One of McGough's early poems, Let Me Die a Youngman's Death (but not, as the poem states, before the poet reaches 73, 91 or 104 years of age), was included in a BBC anthology of the British nation's hundred favourite poems. McGough has been nicknamed "the patron saint of poetry" by Carol Ann Duffy.

Philip Larkin included McGough's poetry in The Oxford Book of Twentieth Century English Verse, which he edited in 1973. Writing to McGough in 1980, Larkin congratulated him on the well-thumbed state of the copies of his books in Hull University's library, when compared to Larkin's own.

Possibly his shortest, most memorable and overtly political poem, was entitled "Conservative Government Unemployment Figures". The text of poem repeats the words of the title, with layout and punctuation resulting in an arch critique. The poem was referenced in a parliamentary debate in the House of Commons in 2004.

The poetry of McGough has been the subject of academic study. It has been characterised, at least from its early examples, as being reliant on play with words and their meanings. It has also been noted to exhibit a stylised wit, and, at times, a sadness based on themes of lost youth, unfulfilled relationships, and the downside of city life. The form of some of his verse, it has been claimed, has been influenced by his experience of writing song lyrics. A major critical examination of McGough's poetry, by American academic Ben Wright, was published in 2006. The author's stated aim was "to examine and evaluate the accessibility of Roger McGough's message to a wide, general readership, as well as appraising it by the most rigorous literary standards". McGough's popularity, commercial success, use of humour, and the lack of pretension of his verse has tended to restrict appreciation of his work as "serious poetry". Wright's study challenges this under-appreciation.

== Other activities ==
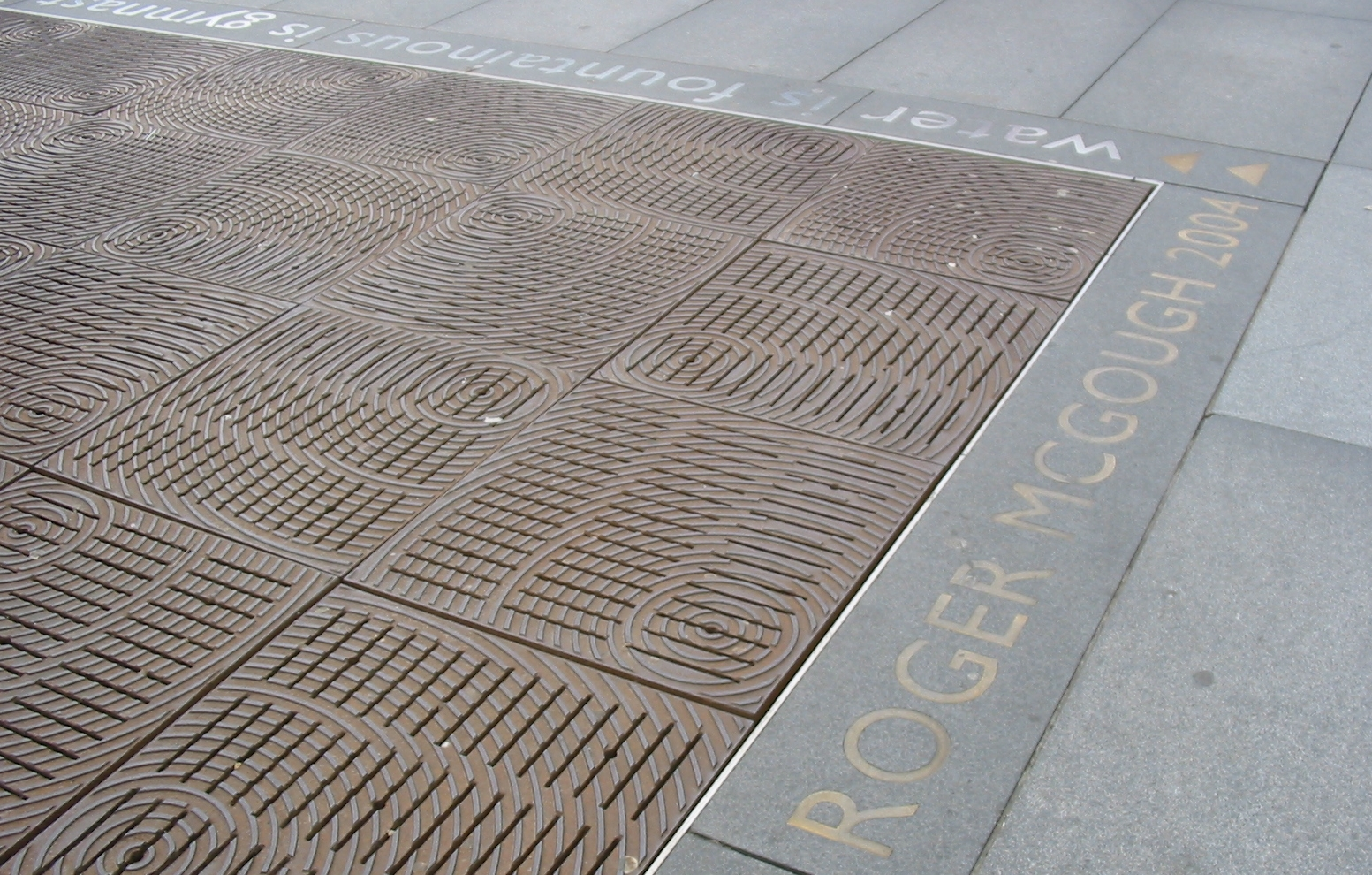
A 2004 sculptural fountain installation in Liverpool, quoting Roger McGough's poetical evocation of water

McGough was responsible for much of the humorous dialogue in the Beatles' animated film Yellow Submarine, although he did not receive an on-screen credit.

only trouble with
Japanese haiku is that
You write one, and then

only seventeen
syllables later you want
to write another.

— from "Two Haiku" (1982),
Waving at Trains

On 2 March 1978, McGough appeared in All You Need Is Cash, a mockumentary detailing the career of a Beatles-like group called the Rutles. Interviewed by Eric Idle, the introduction of McGough takes so long that he is only asked one question, "Did you know the Rutles?" to which McGough cheerfully responds "Oh yes", before the documentary is forced to move along to other events. In 1980 he recited a high-speed one-minute version of Longfellow's poem "The Wreck of the Hesperus", complete with sound effects, on the album Miniatures produced by Morgan Fisher.

One of McGough's more unusual compositions was created in 1981, when he co-wrote an "electronic poem" called Now Press Return with the programmer Richard Warner for inclusion with the Welcome Tape of the BBC Micro home computer. Now Press Return incorporated several novel themes, including user-defined elements to the poem, lines which changed their order (and meaning) every few seconds, and text which wrote itself in a spiral around the screen. He contributed poetry to and narrated a programme in 1991 for Channel 4 called Equinox: The Elements about the elements. He made a guest appearance on quiz panel show QI in 2006.

Three plays written by the 17th-century French playwright Molière have been translated by McGough and directed by Gemma Bodinetz. Tartuffe premièred at the Liverpool Playhouse in May 2008 and transferred subsequently to the Rose Theatre, Kingston. The Hypochondriac (The Imaginary Invalid) was staged at the Liverpool Playhouse in July 2009. The Misanthrope was staged at the Liverpool Playhouse in February–March 2013 before touring with the English Touring Theatre.

McGough has also done some voiceover work narrating The Very Hungry Caterpillar and Other Stories by Eric Carle, and TV advertisements for the supermarket chain Waitrose.

He is a patron of Barnes Literary Society. In 2019 he became the President of Arts Richmond for one year.

== Awards ==
McGough won a Cholmondeley Award in 1998, and was appointed an Officer (OBE) in 1997, and later, in 2004, Commander (CBE) of the Order of the British Empire.

He holds an honorary MA from Nene College of Further Education, and honorary Doctor of Letters (D.Litt.) degrees from the University of Hull (2004), Roehampton University (2006), and the University of Liverpool (2006). He was made a Fellow of the Royal Society of Literature in 2004.

== Academic posts ==
McGough was Fellow of Poetry at Loughborough University (1973–75), Honorary Fellow at John Moores University, and Honorary Professor at Thames Valley University (1993).

== Personal life ==
In 1970, McGough married Thelma Monaghan, and they had two children; they divorced in 1980. He married Hilary Clough in December 1986, with whom he has two children. He lives in Barnes, south west London; he and Clough previously lived on Portobello Road in Notting Hill Gate.

== Books ==
=== Poetry collections ===
- Young Commonwealth Poets '65, Heinemann, 1965
- The Mersey Sound (with Adrian Henri and Brian Patten), Penguin, 1967
- Frinck, A Life in the Day of, and Summer with Monika: Poems, Joseph, 1967
- Watchwords, Cape, 1969
- After the Merrymaking, Cape, 1971
- Out of Sequence, Turret Books, 1972
- Gig, Cape, 1973
- Sporting Relations, Eyre Methuen, 1974
- In the Glassroom, Cape, 1976
- Mr Noselighter, André Deutsch, 1976
- Holiday on Death Row, Cape, 1979
- Unlucky for Some, Bernard Stone, 1980
- Waving at Trains, Cape, 1982
- Crocodile Puddles, New Pyramid Press, 1984
- Sky in the Pie, Puffin, 1985 (children's)
- Melting into the Foreground, Viking, 1986
- Noah's Ark, Dinosaur, 1986
- Worry, Toni Savage, 1987
- Nailing the Shadow, Viking Kestrel, 1987
- Counting by Numbers, Viking Kestrel, 1989
- Selected Poems, 1967–1987, Cape, 1989
- You at the Back: Selected Poems, 1967–87, Cape, 1991
- Defying Gravity, Viking, 1992
- Pen Pals: A New Poem, Prospero Poets, 1994
- Ferens, the Gallery Cat, Ferens Art Gallery, 1997
- Todays Yodal, Over years ago, 1999
- Until I Met Dudley, Frances Lincoln, 1997
- The Way Things Are, Viking, 1999
- Dotty Inventions, Francis Lincoln, 2002
- Everyday Eclipses, Viking, 2002
- Collected Poems, Viking, 2003
- That Awkward Age, Penguin, 2009
- As Far As I Know, Penguin, 2012
- Joinedupwriting, Viking, 2019
- Safety In Numbers, Viking, 2021

=== Plays ===
- Tartuffe (English adaptation of Molière's play)
- The Hypochondriac (English adaption of Molière's play)
- The Misanthrope (English adaptation of Molière's play)

=== Autobiography ===
- Said And Done, Random House, 2005

== See also ==
- Liverpool poets
