= Adrian Henri =

British poet and painter (1932–2000)

- Born: 10 April 1932; Birkenhead, Cheshire, England
- Died: 20 December 2000 (aged 68); Liverpool, England
- Education: King's College, Newcastle
- Occupations: Poet and painter
- Writing career
- Notable works: The Liverpool Scene; The Mersey Sound

Adrian Henri (10 April 1932 – 20 December 2000) was a British poet and painter best remembered as the founder of poetry-rock group The Liverpool Scene and as one of three poets in the best-selling anthology The Mersey Sound, along with Brian Patten and Roger McGough. The trio of Liverpool poets came to prominence in that city's Merseybeat zeitgeist of the 1960s and 1970s. He was described by Edward Lucie-Smith in British Poetry since 1945 as the "theoretician" of the three. Henri's characterisation of popular culture in verse helped to widen the audience for poetry among 1960s British youth. He was influenced by the French Symbolist school of poetry and surrealist art.

== Life and career ==
Front cover of the best-selling anthology The Mersey Sound, which featured Henri, with Roger McGough and Brian Patten

Adrian Henri's grandfather was a seaman from Mauritius who settled in Birkenhead, Cheshire, where Henri was born. In 1938, at the age of six, he moved to Rhyl in Wales. He studied art at King's College (now Newcastle University) and for a short time taught art at Preston Catholic College before going on to lecture in art at both Manchester and Liverpool Colleges of Art. He was closely associated with other artists of the area and the era including the Pop artist Neville Weston and the conceptual artist Keith Arnatt. In 1972 he won second prize for his painting Meat Painting II – In Memoriam Rene Magritte in the John Moores competition. He was president of the Merseyside Arts Association and Liverpool Academy of the Arts in the 1970s and was an honorary professor of the city's John Moores University.

Henri had a 10-year relationship with Carol Ann Duffy, who later became Poet Laureate of the United Kingdom. The pair met when she was 16, him 39 at the time, and lived together until 1982. Henri married once, to Joyce; the couple later separated. He had no children. For the last 15 years of his life his partner was Catherine Marcangeli. His career spanned everything from artist and poet to teacher, rock-and-roll performer, playwright and librettist. He could name among his friends John Lennon, George Melly, Allen Ginsberg, Willy Russell, John Willett and Paul McCartney. Unlike McGough and Patten, Henri turned his back on the trendier London scene, and chose to remain in Liverpool, saying there was nowhere he loved better.

His numerous publications include The Mersey Sound (Penguin, 1967), with McGough and Patten, a best-selling poetry anthology that brought all three of them to wider attention, Collected Poems, 1967–85 (Allison & Busby, 1986), Wish You Were Here (Jonathan Cape, 1990) and Not Fade Away (Bloodaxe Books, 1994).

THE MARCHING DRUMS

hideous masked Breughel faces of old ladies in the crowd yellow masks of girls in curlers and headscarves smelling of factories Masks Masks Masks red masks purple masks pink masks

crushing surging carrying me along down the hill past the Philharmonic The Labour Exchange excited feet crushing the geraniums in St Luke's Gardens placards banners posters Keep Britain White End the War in Vietnam God Bless Our Pope

— Excerpt from "The Entry of Christ into Liverpool", published in The Mersey Sound

He was the leading light of a band, The Liverpool Scene, which released four LPs of poetry and music. Earlier, in 1955, he had played washboard in the skiffle group of King's College, Newcastle. He was a firm believer in live poetry reading, and read his poetry at many and varied venues as well as holding poetry workshops at schools and colleges. One of his last major poetry readings was at the launch of The Argotist magazine in 1996.

In 1986, Henri became the first President of the National Acrylic Painters' Association, a post he held until 1991, after which he became its first Fellow and Patron until his death in 2000.

He died in Liverpool, aged 68, having never properly recovered from a stroke that he had suffered two years previously. The night before his death, Liverpool City Council conferred on him the Freedom of the City in recognition of his contribution to Liverpool's cultural scene. He also received an honorary doctorate from the University of Liverpool.

He described his early philosophy as: "If you think you can do it and you want to do it—then do it."

In 2012 Adrian Henri: Total Artist was released. Total Artist concentrates on Henri's work from the 1960s and 1970s, as well as capturing some of the excitement and dynamics of the art scene in Britain during this time. Henri was at the centre of a distinctive yet highly connected counter-culture, providing an opportunity to consider his embrace of total art as a template for interdisciplinary art practice. Published by Occasional Papers, the Exhibition Research Centre, Liverpool John Moores University and Université Paris Diderot.

== The Liverpool Scene ==
The Liverpool Scene was a poetry band, formed around 1967, which included Adrian Henri, Andy Roberts, Mike Evans, Mike Hart (ex Liverpool Roadrunners), Percy Jones and Brian Dodson. Four LPs were issued with Henri's poetry heavily featured. The first one was produced by Liverpool DJ John Peel, who was then working on the pirate radio station Radio London. Despite his support, the album achieved little success: the following three were equally unsuccessful. Public performances by the band included a (financially unsuccessful) 1969 tour when they opened for Led Zeppelin. Henri was described in performance as "bouncing thunderously and at risk to audience and fellow performers, the stage vibrating out of rhythm beneath him." The Liverpool Scene disbanded in April 1970.

The albums were:

- The Incredible New Liverpool Scene
- The Amazing Adventures Of
- Bread on the Night
- St. Adrian & Co., Broadway and 3rd
- Heirloon (rarities and outtakes)

There were at least three "best of" albums and two non-LP singles, "Love Is"/"The Woo-Woo" and "Son, Son"/"Baby".

== Bibliography ==
- Biggs, Bryan; Hudek, Antony; Marcangeli, Catherine. Adrian Henri: Total Artist. London: Occasional Papers, 2014.

== See also ==
- Liverpool poets
- Peter Edwards
