= Biennale =

Event occurring every two years

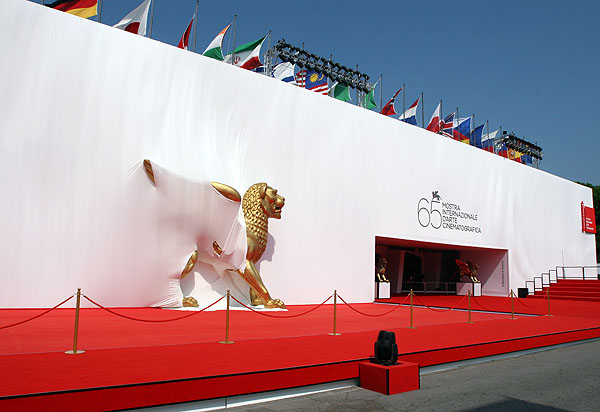
The Venice International Film Festival is part of the Venice Biennale. The famous Golden Lion is awarded to the best film screening at the competition.

In the art world, a biennale (/ˌbiːɛˈnɑːleɪ, -li/ BEE-en-AH-lay, -lee, Italian: [bi.enˈnaːle]; Italian for 'biennial' / 'every other year'), is a large-scale international contemporary art exhibition. The term was popularised by the Venice Biennale, which was first held in 1895, but the concept of such a large scale, and intentionally international event goes back to at least the 1851 Great Exhibition in London. The 1990s saw the boom of art biennials, a period of multiplication of this exhibition form during which art biennials grew from approximately five to over 250 internationally.

Although typically used to refer to art festivals or exhibitions which occur every two years, the term is not always applied strictly. Since the 1990s, the terms biennale and biennial have both been used to refer to large-scale international survey shows of contemporary art that recur at regular intervals (Documenta is held every five years, and Skulptur Projekte Münster every ten).

The term has also derived a suffix for other creative events, as in "Berlinale" for the Berlin International Film Festival and "Viennale" for the Vienna International Film Festival, both of which are actually held annually.

== Characteristics ==
According to author Federica Martini, what is at stake in contemporary biennales is the diplomatic and international relations potential as well as urban regeneration plans. Besides being mainly focused on the present (the "here and now" where the cultural event takes place and their effect of "spectacularisation of the everyday"), because of their site-specificity cultural events may refer back to, produce or frame the history of the site and communities' collective memory.

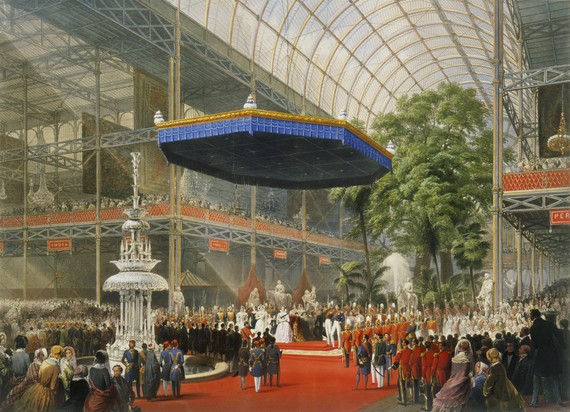
The Great Exhibition in The Crystal Palace in Hyde Park, London, in 1851, the first attempt to condense the representation of the world within a unitary exhibition space.

An influential example of biennales and of large-scale international exhibitions in general is the Crystal Palace, the gigantic and futuristic London architecture that hosted the Great Exhibition in 1851. According to philosopher Peter Sloterdijk, the Crystal Palace is the first attempt to condense the representation of the world in a unitary exhibition space, where the main exhibit is society itself in an a-historical, spectacular condition. The Crystal Palace's main motives were the affirmation of British economic and national leadership and the creation of moments of spectacle. In this respect, 19th century World fairs provided a visual crystallization of colonial culture and were, at the same time, forerunners of contemporary theme parks.

=== The Venice Biennale as an archetype ===
The structure of the Venice Biennale in 2005 with an international exhibition and the national pavilions.

The Venice Biennale, a periodical large-scale cultural event founded in 1895, served as an archetype of the biennales. Meant to become a World Fair focused on contemporary art, the Venice Biennale used as a pretext the wedding anniversary of the Italian king and followed up to several national exhibitions organised after Italy unification in 1861. The Biennale immediately put forth issues of city marketing, cultural tourism and urban regeneration, as it was meant to reposition Venice on the international cultural map after the crisis due to the end of the Grand Tour model and the weakening of the Venetian school of painting. Furthermore, the Gardens where the Biennale takes place were an abandoned city area that needed to be re-functionalised. In cultural terms, the Biennale was meant to provide on a biennial basis a platform for discussing contemporary art practices that were not represented in fine arts museums at the time. The early Biennale model already included some key points that are still constitutive of large-scale international art exhibitions today: a mix of city marketing, internationalism, gentrification issues and destination culture, and the spectacular, large scale of the event.

=== Biennials after the 1990s ===
The situation of biennials has changed in the contemporary context: while at its origin in 1895 Venice was a unique cultural event, but since the 1990s hundreds of biennials have been organized across the globe. Given the ephemeral and irregular nature of some biennials, there is little consensus on the exact number of biennials in existence at any given time. Furthermore, while Venice was a unique agent in the presentation of contemporary art, since the 1960s several museums devoted to contemporary art are exhibiting the contemporary scene on a regular basis. Another point of difference concerns 19th century internationalism in the arts, that was brought into question by post-colonial debates and criticism of the contemporary art "ethnic marketing", and also challenged the Venetian and World Fair's national representation system. As a consequence of this, Eurocentric tendency to implode the whole word in an exhibition space, which characterises both the Crystal Palace and the Venice Biennale, is affected by the expansion of the artistic geographical map to scenes traditionally considered as marginal. The birth of the Havana Biennial in 1984 is widely considered an important counterpoint to the Venetian model for its prioritization of artists working in the Global South and curatorial rejection of the national pavilion model.

== International biennales ==
In the term's most commonly used context of major recurrent art exhibitions:

- Adelaide Biennial of Australian Art, South Australia
- Asian Art Biennale, in Taichung, Taiwan (National Taiwan Museum of Fine Arts)
- Athens Biennale, in Athens, Greece
- Diriyah Contemporary Art Biennale, in Diriyah, Saudi Arabia
- Bienal de Arte Paiz, in Guatemala City, Guatemala
- Arts in Marrakech (AiM) International Biennale (Arts in Marrakech Festival)
- Bamako Encounters, a biennale of photography in Mali
- Bat-Yam International Biennale of Landscape Urbanism
- Beijing Biennale
- Berlin Biennale (contemporary art biennale, to be distinguished from Berlinale, which is a film festival)
- Bergen Assembly (triennial for contemporary art in Bergen, Norway)www.bergenassembly.no
- Beta – Timișoara Architecture Biennial, Romania
- Bi-City Biennale of Urbanism\Architecture, in Shenzhen and Hong Kong, China
- Bienal de Arte de Ponce in Ponce, Puerto Rico
- Biënnale van België, Biennial of Belgium, Belgium
- BiennaleOnline Online biennial exhibition of contemporary art from the most promising emerging artists.
- Biennial of Hawaii Artists
- Biennale de la Biche, the smallest biennale in the world held at deserted island near Guadeloupe, French overseas region
- Biwako Biennale, in Shiga, Japan
- La Biennale de Montreal
- Biennale of Luanda : Pan-African Forum for the Culture of Peace, Angola
- Boom Festival, international music and culture festival in Idanha-a-Nova, Portugal
- Bucharest Biennale in Bucharest, Romania
- Bushwick Biennial, in Bushwick, Brooklyn, New York
- Canakkale Biennial, in Canakkale, Turkey
- Cello Biennale, Amsterdam, the Netherlands
- Cerveira International Art Biennial, Vila Nova de Cerveira, Portugal
- Changwon Sculpture Biennale in Changwon, South Korea
- Dakar Biennale, also called Dak'Art, biennale in Dakar, Senegal
- Documenta, contemporary art exhibition held every five years in Kassel, Germany
- Estuaire (biennale), biennale in Nantes and Saint-Nazaire, France
- EVA International, biennial in Limerick, Ireland
- Göteborg International Biennial for Contemporary Art, in Gothenburg, Sweden
- Greater Taipei Contemporary Art Biennial, in Taipei, Taiwan
- Gwangju Biennale, Asia's first and most prestigious contemporary art biennale
- Havana biennial, in Havana, Cuba
- Helsinki Biennial, in Helsinki, Finland
- Herzliya Biennial For Contemporary Art, in Herzliya, Israel
- Incheon Women Artists' Biennale, in Incheon, South Korea
- Iowa Biennial, in Iowa, US
- Istanbul Biennial, in Istanbul, Turkey
- International Roaming Biennial of Tehran, in Tehran and Istanbul
- Jakarta Biennale, in Jakarta, Indonesia
- Jerusalem Biennale, in Jerusalem, Israel
- Jogja Biennale, in Yogyakarta, Indonesia
- Karachi Biennale, in Karachi, Pakistan
- Keelung Harbor Biennale, in Keelung, Taiwan
- Kochi-Muziris Biennale, largest art exhibition in India, in Kochi, Kerala, India
- Kortrijk Design Biennale Interieur, in Kortrijk, Belgium
- Kobe Biennale, in Japan
- Kuandu Biennale, in Taipei, Taiwan
- Lagos Biennial, in Lagos, Nigeria
- Light Art Biennale Austria, in Austria
- Liverpool Biennial, in Liverpool, UK
- Lofoten International Art Festival (LIAF), on the Lofoten archipelago, Norway
- Manifesta, European Biennale of contemporary art in different European cities
- Mediations Biennale, in Poznań, Poland
- Melbourne International Biennial 1999
- Mediterranean Biennale in Sakhnin 2013
- MOMENTA Biennale de l'image (formerly known as Le Mois de la Photo à Montréal), in Montreal, Canada
- MOMENTUM, in Moss, Norway
- Moscow Biennale, in Moscow, Russia
- Munich Biennale, new opera and music-theatre in even-numbered years
- Mykonos Biennale
- Nakanojo Biennale
- NGV Triennial, contemporary art exhibition held every three years at the National Gallery of Victoria, Melbourne, Australia
- October Salon – Belgrade Biennale, organised by the Cultural Center of Belgrade, in Belgrade, Serbia
- OSTEN Biennial of Drawing Skopje, North Macedonia
- Biennale de Paris
- Riga International Biennial of Contemporary Art (RIBOCA), in Riga, Latvia
- São Paulo Art Biennial, in São Paulo, Brazil
- SCAPE Public Art Christchurch Biennial in Christchurch, New Zealand
- Prospect New Orleans
- Seoul Biennale of Architecture and Urbanism
- Sequences, in Reykjavík, Iceland
- Shanghai Biennale
- Sharjah Biennale, in Sharjah, UAE
- Singapore Biennale, held in various locations across the city-state island of Singapore
- Screen City Biennial, in Stavanger, Norway
- String Quartet Biennale Amsterdam, the Netherlands
- Biennale of Sydney
- Taipei Biennale, in Taipei, Taiwan
- Taiwan Arts Biennale, in Taichung, Taiwan (National Taiwan Museum of Fine Arts)
- Taiwan Film Biennale, in Hammer Museum, Los Angeles, U.S.
- Thessaloniki Biennale of Contemporary Art, in Thessaloniki, Greece
- Dream city, produced by ART Rue Association in Tunisia
- Vancouver Biennale
- Visayas Islands Visual Arts Exhibition and Conference (VIVA ExCon) in the Philippines
- Venice Biennale, in Venice, Italy, which includes:
  - Venice Biennale of Contemporary Art
  - Venice Biennale of Architecture
  - Venice Film Festival
- Vladivostok biennale of Visual Arts, in Vladivostok, Russia
- Whitney Biennial, hosted by the Whitney Museum of American Art, in New York City, NY, US
- Web Biennial, produced with teams from Athens, Berlin and Istanbul.
- West Africa Architecture Biennale, Virtual in Lagos, Nigeria.
- WRO Biennale, in Wrocław, Poland
- Music Biennale Zagreb
- [SHIFT:ibpcpa] The International Biennale of Performance, Collaborative and Participatory Arts, Nomadic, International, Scotland, UK.
- Yerevan Print Biennale

== See also ==
- World's fair
- Art exhibition
- Art festival
- Art biennials in Africa
- Filipovic, Elena (2010). Marieke van Hal, Solveig Øvsteø (ed.). The Biennial Reader. Bergen, Norway: Bergen Biennial Conference.
- Checa-Gismero, Paloma (2024), Biennial Boom: Making Contemporary Art Global, Durham: Duke University Press
- (Spanish) Niemojewski, Rafal (2013) "Venecia o La Habana: Una polémica sobre la génesis de la bienal contemporánea." Denken Pensée Thought Mysl... Criterios, Issue 47 (October).
- Jones, Caroline (March 29, 2006), Biennial Culture, Institute national d'histoire de l'art, Paris
- (in English and Italian) Vittoria Martini e Federica Martini, Just another exhibition. Histories and politics of biennials, Postmedia Books, 2011 ISBN 978-88-7490-060-2, ISBN 978-88-7490-060-2
- Federica Martini, Cultural event in Mobile A2K Methodology guide, 2002.
- Manifesta Journal No 2 Winter 2003/ Spring 2004 - Biennials. Artimo Foundation. June 1, 2003. ISBN 978-90-75380-95-8.
- Morris, Jane (May 1, 2019). "Why is the Venice Biennale still so important?". The Art Newspaper.
- Niemojewski, Rafal (2006) "Whence Come You, and Whither Are you Going? On the Memory and Identity of Biennials" Manifesta Journal, MJ – Journal of Contemporary Curatorship, N°6 Winter 2005/06
- Niemojewski, Rafal (2014) "Turning the Tide: the oppositional past and uncertain future of the contemporary biennial" Seismopolite: Journal of Art and Politics, Volume 1, Issue 6, (February).
- Niemojewski, Rafal (2018) "Contemporary Art Biennials: Decline or Resurgence?" Cultural Politics, Duke University Press, Volume 14, Issue 1, (Spring).
- Niemojewski, Rafal (2021) Biennials: The Exhibitions We Love to Hate, Lund Humphries. ISBN 978-1-84822-388-2
- Vanderlinden, Barbara (June 2, 2006). Elena Filipovic (ed.). The Manifesta Decade: Debates on Contemporary Art Exhibitions and Biennials in Post-Wall Europe (illustrated ed.). The MIT Press. ISBN 978-0-262-22076-7.
