= Peter Feldstein =

Peter Feldstein may refer to:

- Peter Feldstein (photographer) (1942–2017)
- Peter Feldstein (translator)
