= Youmna Chlala =

Lebanese-American artist and writer

Youmna Chlala is a Lebanese-American artist and writer.

== Biography ==
She was born in Beirut and grew up there and in Los Angeles. Chlala received a MFA in creative writing from the California College of the Arts. She is a visiting member of the faculty at LaGuardia Community College and the Pratt Institute.

With Gayle Romasanta, Chlala founded the literary journal Eleven Eleven.

Chlala's art has been exhibited at the Institute of Contemporary Arts in London, the International Film Festival Rotterdam, at the Museum of Contemporary Art Detroit, at the San Jose Museum of Art, at the Arab American National Museum and at the Yerba Buena Center for the Arts. She has participated in group exhibitions at the Performa Biennial and the International Roaming Biennial of Tehran.

She has been artist in residence at the Henie Onstad Kunstsenter in Norway, at the Triangle Arts and Makkan in Shatana, Jordan and at the Headlands Center for the Arts in California. Chlala received a fellowship from the Fine Arts Work Center in Provincetown, Massachusetts.

Her writing has appeared in Guernica, in Bespoke, in CURA, in the MIT Electronic Journal of Middle Eastern Studies and in XCP: Journal of Cross Cultural Poetics. Chlala also contributed to the book Nation, Gender, and Belonging: Arab and Arab American Feminist Perspectives.

Her work explores the interaction of fate and architecture through various media including sculpture, drawing, video, installation and performance.

== Awards and honours ==
She has been nominated for the Ruth Lilly Poetry Prize. In 2009, Chlala received a Joseph Henry Jackson Literary Award for her poetry manuscript The Paper Camera. Chlala's short story "Nayla" was included in the 2018 O. Henry Award collection.
