= Estuaire =

Estuaire may refer to:

- Estuaire (Gabon), a province in Gabon
- Estuaire (biennale), a contemporary art exhibition in France
