= Lundahl & Seitl =

Swedish artist duo

Lundahl & Seitl is a Stockholm-based artist duo formed in 2003 by Christer Lundahl (born 1978 Jönköping, Sweden) and Martina Seitl (born 1979, Jönköping, Sweden). The duo's practice consists of site-specific situations and cross-disciplinary projects, "where the line between action and perception is renegotiated", as noted by Frida Sandström.

The duo's working method has been described as being a combination of staging, choreographed movement, instructions, sculpture, spatial sound, and augmented and virtual reality, through the exploration of notions such as freedom, autonomy, reality, imagination, memory, and the relation between humans and technology.

== Selected artworks ==
In 2019, Lundahl & Seitl in collaboration with ScanLAB Projects created The Eternal Return series, which consists of three choreographed and mixed-reality artworks that examine virtual reality. The Unknown Cloud series was brought to life in 2015 and it is an artwork, which is based on visitor participation through the usage of an application and guidance of audio-visual instructions. According to Josephine Machon, the work tackles themes such as human perception, inclusion, and interconnectedness. In the Symphony of a Missing Room series (2009), the audience experiences a museum venue through participation, which has been created through various technical, choreographed, and voice stimuli, as Ronald Jones described. The artwork investigates the nature of memory.

== Exhibitions ==
Lundahl & Seitl had solo and group exhibitions in several venues, such as Royal Academy of Arts (London, 2014), Martin-Gropius-Bau (Berlin, 2016); Kunstmuseum Bonn (2017); Accelerator (2017, Stockholm); ‘Tunnelvision’, Momentum 8, Nordic Biennale of Contemporary Art (2015, Moss, Norway); ‘An Imagined Museum’, Centre Pompidou Metz (France, 2016-2017); ‘forming in the pupil of an eye’, Kochi Muziris Biennale (India, 2016); ‘Temple of Alternative Histories’ at Staatsteater Kassel (Kassel, 2022); Screen City Biennial: ‘Other Minds’ (Berlin, 2022).

== Awards ==
- 2010 - Stockholm Art Prize
- 2010 - Birgit Cullberg Prize
- 2011 - Salzburg Festival Young Directors Award (Montblanc)
- 2011 - Edstrandska Foundation for Contemporary Art Award
- 2019 - Sven Harrys Art Prize
- 2020 - Shortlisted for the Lumen Prize
- 2022 - STRP ACT Award, co-artists Untold Garden
