= Iowa Biennial =

- Genre: biennale, focus on contemporary miniature printmaking
- Frequency: biennial, every two years.
- Website: http://www.iowabiennial.org

The Iowa Biennial Exhibition and Archive (TIBEA) began in 2004 as an international survey of contemporary miniature printmaking with its initial exhibition held at the University of Iowa in Iowa City, Iowa. Works juried for the exhibition travel for exhibitions within the U.S. as well as internationally, with exhibitions in Cedar Rapids, Iowa and Riga, Latvia, to date.

The Iowa Biennial Exhibition is a non-profit endeavor that serves to support a collection of works accessioned within an open archive, The Iowa Biennial Exhibition Archive, while making the public collection available for academic education, research, museums, artists, and print students. Works within the archive are used to promote a greater awareness of the uniqueness and beauty of the print, print media, and printmaking (both traditional and non-traditional). Submissions for works are accepted on even years beginning in January through April. The Iowa Biennial Exhibition is an all-volunteer, non-profit, cultural and research-oriented event, and no profits are sought from its submissions or participants, while submitted and accepted works will never be sold.

Distinguished jurors invited to participate are established professionals from a diverse selection of art disciplines within Iowa. Notable jurors have included: Virginia A. Myers, Peter Feldstein, and Dr. Rachel M. Williams, all from the University of Iowa’s School of Art & Art History; Julie Leonard from the University of Iowa’s Center for the Book and the School of Art & Art History; Shannon Kennedy from the University of Iowa’s School of Art & Art History and Coe College's Department of Art in Cedar Rapids [also formerly at Kirkwood Community College-Iowa City]; Kayt Conrad of the University of Iowa’s Division of Performing Arts [formerly Art Coordinator and Interim Dean of Arts & Humanities at Kirkwood Community College]; as well as Helen Grunwald, Doug Hall, and Rahat Sodaev, all faculty from the Arts & Humanities Department of Kirkwood Community College in Cedar Rapids.

The 2006 Iowa Biennial exhibition received a 2007 "ICKY" award nomination—along with exhibitions on Andy Warhol and Grant Wood—for Best Visual Arts Programming from the Iowa Cultural Corridor Alliance for its exhibition at the University of Iowa Project Art Gallery.

In late 2007, The Iowa Biennial Exhibition & Archive merged its efforts with The Texas Biennial Exhibition & Archive to form The Americas Biennial Exhibition & Archive of Contemporary Prints, a non-profit, all-volunteer, fine arts endeavor. All works formerly entered into either The Iowa Biennial Exhibition & Archive or the Texas Biennial Exhibition & Archive have been accessioned into The Americas Biennial Exhibition & Archive [TABEA] within their respective collections.

== See also ==
- Art exhibition
- Biennale
