= Amirali Ghasemi =

Iranian curator and artist (born 1980)

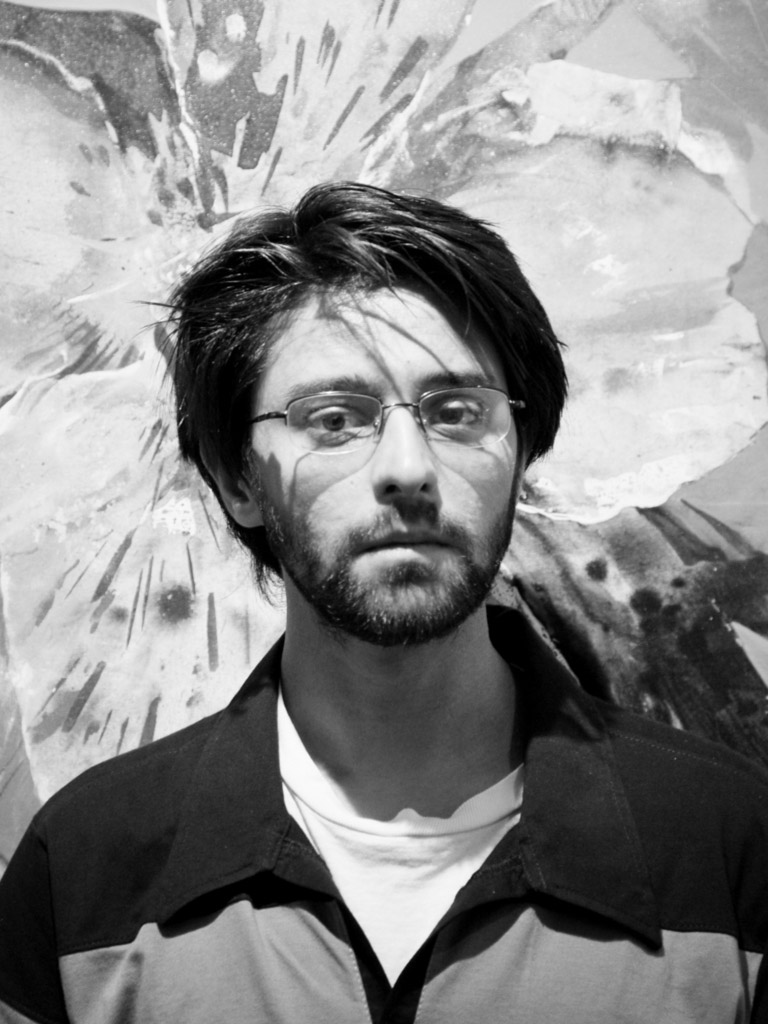
- Amirali Ghasemi
- Born: 20 August 1980 (age 45); Tehran (Iran)
- Occupations: Curator, media artist, and graphic designer
- Known for: Parking Video Library, New Media Society
- Movement: Photography Performance art Installation art
- Relatives: Mohammad Javad Pourvakil and Akram Naraghi (grandparents)
- Website: https://amiralighasemi.org/

Amirali Ghasemi (Persian: امیرعلی قاسمی; b. 20 August 1980) is an Iranian independent curator, media artist, and graphic designer based in Tehran and Berlin. He is the founder and director of Parkingallery, an art space in Tehran that has established itself as an accessible platform for young Iranian contemporary artists. He also founded New Media Society and focuses on his curatorial projects at New Media Society and Tamaas Foundation for Media Arts.

He has worked at both art production and curating with the intention of showing aspects of Contemporary art in Iran that do not fall into the trope of what he calls, Chador art or stereotypes of life in Iran packaged for foreign consumption.

== Early life and education ==
Amirali Ghasemi was born in Tehran on 20 August 1980. His grandparents published Arash, a political and cultural commentary magazine in the 1960s, while his parents work in journalism and social communication. Amirali studied graphic design at Islamic Azad University Central Tehran Branch receiving a BFA in 2004 and pursued further studies at the Institute for Art in Context at the Universität der Künste in Berlin.

== Work ==
=== Artworks ===
Amirali Ghasemi's best-known work is his 2006 piece, Tehran Remixed: Party Series. This series showcases the social activities of young Iranians in private homes. To protect their identities and highlight the potentially rebellious nature of their actions under the current regime, their faces and any exposed skin are covered. Ghasemi, the artist behind the series, observes that the meaning of his works varies greatly depending on the context and often addresses topics such as censorship, women's rights, the hijab, and Islam. The series is an "intimate, real-life" depiction of party culture and social life in the private lives of Iranian youth. Ghasemi masked faces so that Iran Reformists could not use his images as an example of how Iranian society was progressing and, at the same time, prevented the conservatives from using his work to clamp down on what they perceived to be un-Islamic activities. Furthermore, Marta Weiss believes that Ghasemi alters what looks like ordinary, spontaneous snapshots by blocking out exposed areas of flesh. By pre-emptively censoring his images, he protects the identity of individuals photographed at unsanctioned private parties. The work evokes the censorship of imported magazines in Iran, where skirts are lengthened, and women’s bodies are covered with strokes of black marker.

=== Curating ===
In 1998, Ghasemi converted his parents' garage into an art studio which over the years transformed into "a workshop space, then a gallery, with turns as a catwalk, lecture hall, and screening space" and finally Parkingallery that quickly became an "energetic hub" in Tehran's art scene. In 2002, an online presence was established to showcase the works of young Iranian contemporary artists. In 2014, the physical space was closed, but the gallery has continued to exist as an online resource. In the summer of 2014, Ghasemi co-founded New Media Society, a project space, library, and video archive in downtown Tehran.

In 2008, Amirali Ghasemi, along with Serhat Köksal, organized Urban Jealousy, the 1st International Roaming Biennial of Tehran, an itinerant exhibition that drew considerable attention. The same year, Ghasemi was invited to organize an exhibition of contemporary Iranian art at Culturcentrum Bruges in Belgium. With such an important curatorial project, Ghasemi found it necessary to challenge clichés and bypass the stereotypical exhibition of Iranian art created and intended for export. Iran & Co presented 11 emerging artists in a performance/exhibition project. The premise of the project by Ghasemi's team was to create a company, Iran & Co that operated as a business that ordered Iranian art from abroad and had it produced there in the manner that artists from wealthier countries have regularly worked with craftsmen or technicians from underdeveloped countries. Of course, it was the other way around in Bruges, Antwerp, and London, where Iran & Co presented technicians and artists from economically strong countries who created and produced work for Iranian artists. In this manner, Iran & Co departed from the so-called "Iran Boom" that, since 2005-2006, led to hundreds of exhibitions and publications dealing with art from Iran and the Middle East.

One of his curatorial projects is Limited Access Festival, The festival has had eight editions so far. The festival showcases video and performance art from Iran and abroad. The festival was initiated in 2007 as a collaborative project between Parkingallery and Azad Art Gallery, and it has since expanded to include other venues and partners. Limited Access since 2007 have featured many prominent and upcoming artists from Iran and the world. The festival invites guest curators and collaborates with various institutions and archives in Berlin, Stockholm, Helsinki, Cairo, Ljubljana, Paris, Toronto, San Francisco, Vienna, Montreal, Brussels, The Hague & Dublin in the past years to fulfill its mission to reduce the gap between various field and promote interdisciplinary practices. The festival aims to create a platform for dialogue and exchange among artists, curators, critics, and audiences who are interested in experimental and interdisciplinary practices.

== Bibliography ==
Dewilde, Michel (2011) "Looking beyond the horizon, Iran & co, 24 October-2 November 2010" in Art Tomorrow. Issue 3. Tehran: Publisher Nazar
Issa, Rose and Bhabha, Homi Eds. (2009) Iranian Photography Now. Berlin: Hatje Cantz
Karimi, Pamela (Spring 2010) "When global art meanders on a magic carpet: A Conversation on Tehran's Roaming Biennial" in The Arab Studies Journal. Washington, D.C.: Vol.18, No.1. p. 294
Khatib, Lina (2012) Image Politics in the Middle East: The Role of the Visual in Political Struggle. London: I.B.Tauris
Orlotti, Marianna (15 April 2015) "Iran & Co. an Iranian Curator Diaries". Curate Archive
Zanganeh, L.A. (2006) My Sister, Guard Your Veil; My Brother, Guard Your Eyes: Uncensored Iranian Voices. Boston: Beacon Press, p. 107
