= Vladivostok biennale =

International art festival

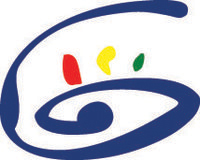

The Vladivostok Biennale of Visual Arts is an international festival of contemporary and modern visual art, held every two years in Vladivostok, Russia. The first Biennale was held in April 1998 in Vladivostok. Then there was presented theatre art only, but after that first Biennale there were made a decision to move beyond the theatre Biennale and turn it into Biennale of visual arts. The founder and organizer of the Vladivostok Biennale is Vladivostok city's administration of Primorsky Krai. An event is sought to rapprochement of Russian and Asia-Pacific region's culture.

== 1998 Biennale ==
The first Biennale was held in April 1998 under the motto "From the world of theater - to the theater of peace" and gathered in Vladivostok more than 150 participants from Russia, Japan, USA, Korea, China, Germany, Vietnam, New Zealand. Their skills demonstrated 9 theaters from Japan and Russia. The result of the first Biennale in Vladivostok was foundation of the International Theatre Institute of Stanislavski, which included Japanese, Russian, American people.

== 2000 Biennale ==
Second Vladivostok Biennale of Visual Arts was held in 2000 under the theme "Creativity - the language of mutual understanding". It was devoted to the 140th anniversary of Vladivostok and the 140th anniversary of the birth of Anton Chekhov.

== 2003 Biennale ==
The third Biennale was held under the motto "To the man, to the city and to the world" from June 30 to July 6, 2003, and gathered in Vladivostok more than 200 participants from Russia and Japan. The year 2003 was declared by the President of Russia V.V. Putin a year of Japanese culture in Russia.

== 2005 Biennale ==
IV Biennale was held from June 30 to July 6 under the motto "Art across the borders". International exposition program was presented by exhibition program "Vladivostok at the crossroads of time and space". V.K. Arsenyev Museum, N. Grodekov State Museum of Far East (Khabarovsk); G.S.Novikova-Daursky Amursky regional history museum; Municipal Museum of Hakodate presented their exhibitions.

== 2007 Biennale ==
The Fifth Biennale was timed to celebrate the birthday of Vladivostok. The main directions were:

- Art creativity - graphics, installation, sculpture entitled "Space - the present";
- Photography - art photography, photo montage on the theme 'City - a contemporary of mine ";
- Music art - instrumental, vocal on "The music of present sounds";
- National art - calligraphy, manga, ikebana, tea ceremony, kendo, and others on the theme "Vladivostok - East."

== 2009 Biennale ==
Sixth Biennial of Visual Arts in Vladivostok gathered young authors and masters of culture from Russia, Japan, Vietnam, China, who presented their works in six program directions: art creativity (painting, graphics, installation), photography (art photography, photomontage, photo installation, video, photo projects, photo collage), national art (decorative and applied arts, calligraphy, comics manga, ikebana, tea ceremony), a musical and theatre arts, design, web design, art projects.

== 2011 Biennale ==
7th Vladivostok Biennale of visual arts will be held from 11 to 15 of September. The main directions of Seventh Biennale are:

- cinematography,
- dramatics,
- video art,
- art,
- ethno.

== Awarding ==
Rewarding of participants is held on program activities and at the Closing Ceremony of Biennale.
