= Beta – Timișoara Architecture Biennial =

Biennial architecture exhibition in Romania

- Genre: Biennale, architecture
- Frequency: Biennial, odd-numbered years since 2016
- Locations: Timișoara, Romania
- Inaugurated: 2016; 10 years ago
- Website: betacity.eu

The Beta – Timișoara Architecture Biennial (Romanian: Beta – Bienala de Arhitectură Timișoara) is an international exhibition of architecture and urbanism held in Timișoara, Romania, typically organized on a biennial basis.

== History ==
Established in 2016, the event is organized by the Order of Architects of Romania (OAR), through its Timiș branch, in collaboration with local cultural institutions and partners. It brings together architects, researchers, and cultural practitioners to explore contemporary spatial practices in relation to social, ecological, and political questions.

In 2020, Beta became a member of LINA (originally the Future Architecture Platform), a European network of architecture institutions.

In 2023, on the occasion of Timișoara’s designation as European Capital of Culture, the Order of Architects of Romania (Timiș branch), in connection with Beta, participated in a public installation on Victory Square (Piața Victoriei) developed with MAIO Architects. The Nursery involved the temporary planting of 1,306 plants and explored the integration of vegetation in urban space as well as its social potential to activate public life. The project was shortlisted for the 2024 European Union Prize for Contemporary Architecture – Mies van der Rohe Award.

== Editions ==
The Biennial is structured around a central curatorial theme and unfolds across multiple venues in the city, combining exhibitions, conferences, workshops, and public programs that engage both professional audiences and the wider public, with a particular emphasis on the local and regional context of Timișoara and Eastern Europe.

- 2016 – Look at the City
- 2018 – On Housing, curated by IDEILAGRAM
- 2020 – Enough IS Enough, curated by Anca Cioarec, Brînduşa Tudor and Ilka Ruby
- 2022 – Another Breach in the Wall, curated by Daniel Tudor Munteanu and Davide Tommaso Ferrando
- 2024 – cover me softly, curated by Oana Stănescu
- 2026 – In Practice, as opposed to 'in theory', curated by Andreas Kofler and Tudor Vlăsceanu
