= Stefano Pasquini =

Italian artist

Stefano W. Pasquini
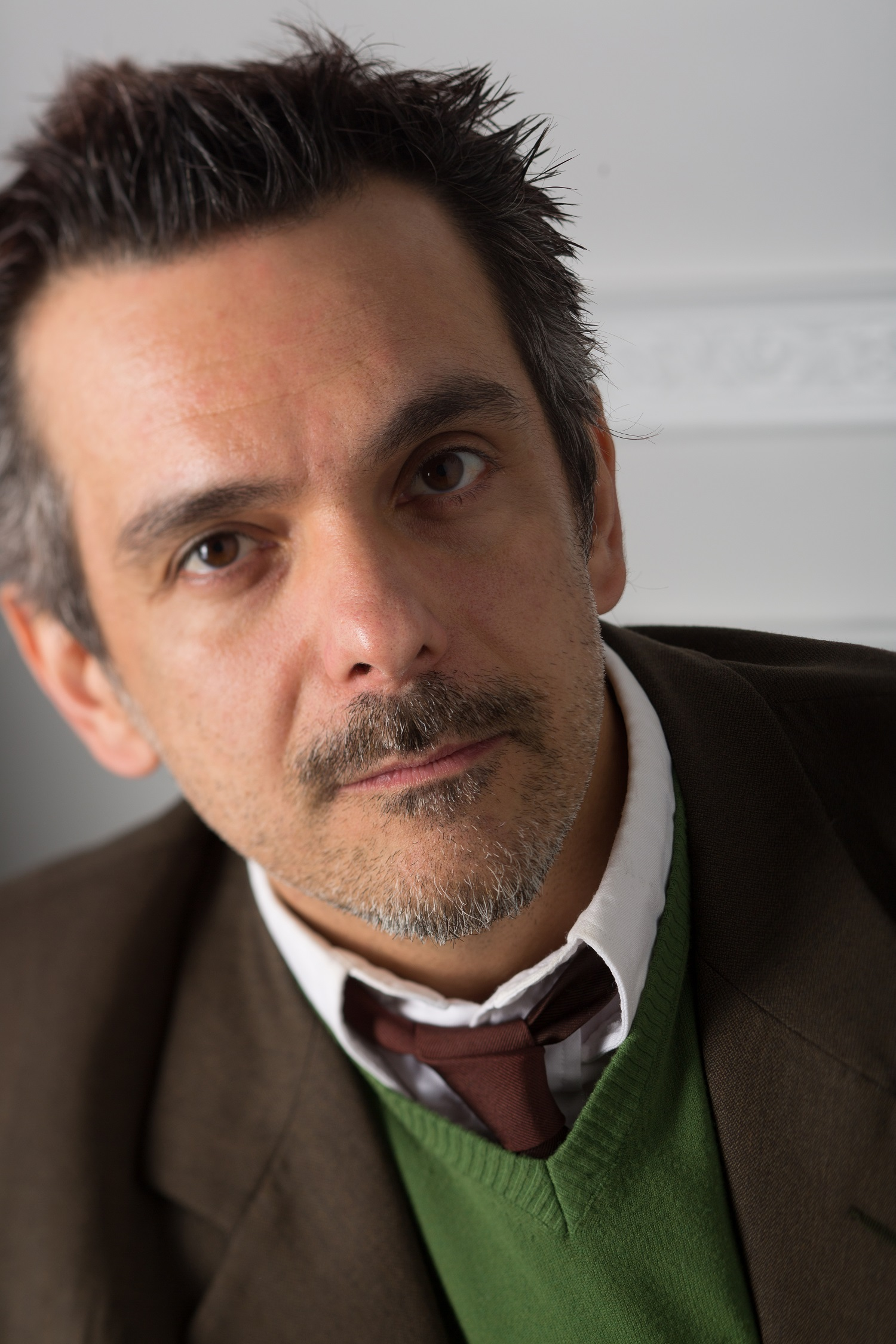
- Stefano W. Pasquini (2014)
- Born: 23 December 1969 (age 55); Bologna, Italy
- Occupation: Italian artist

Stefano W. Pasquini is an Italian contemporary artist, writer and curator living in Italy.
He works with paintings, performance, photography and installation. He also publishes a magazine called Obsolete Shit.

He currently works with the Italian galleries L'Arte, Molinella, Quattrocentometriquadri, Ancona, and MelePere Verona. Since 2010 he has been known as Stefano W. Pasquini.

His style has been defined "horizontal", as it's hard to define practicing in so many different styles. To quote Fabio Cavallucci: "Pasquini doesn’t worry about changing styles and contents: he goes from interactive performances – like when, for example, he dressed like Spider-Man, sitting on the floor of the streets of London – to the hard rock videos – like the one he’s in the woods stuck with his hands and feet onto the ground, shouting like a maniac. He’s also not afraid to return to paintings, portraying, with a fast and synthetic stroke, himself or people from the mass media zoo. Or eschews the indifference in order to approach politics, making works that range from portraying the statesman Aldo Moro in sculpture, as he was found (dead) in the trunk of a Renault in via Caetani, to a performance where a series of people raise on pedestals and wave their hands in the fascist salute."

== Life ==
Pasquini was born in Bologna, Italy. He received his MFA from the Academy of Fine Arts of Bologna in 1991, then immediately left his country for Dublin, briefly, then London for seven years, and New York, where he participated to many exhibitions. He is currently based in Bologna, where he works. He was head curator of Sesto Senso, a small non-profit gallery in Bologna, for the exhibiting seasons of 2001–2002. He was Art Director of "Work – Art in progress", magazine of the Contemporary Art Gallery of Trento, as well as contributing editor of NYArts Magazine.
In 2014 he directed the non-profit art space Studio Cloud 4 curating many exhibitions until 2016. Since 2013 he teaches Tecniche Grafiche Speciali at the Albertina Academy of Fine Arts of Turin.

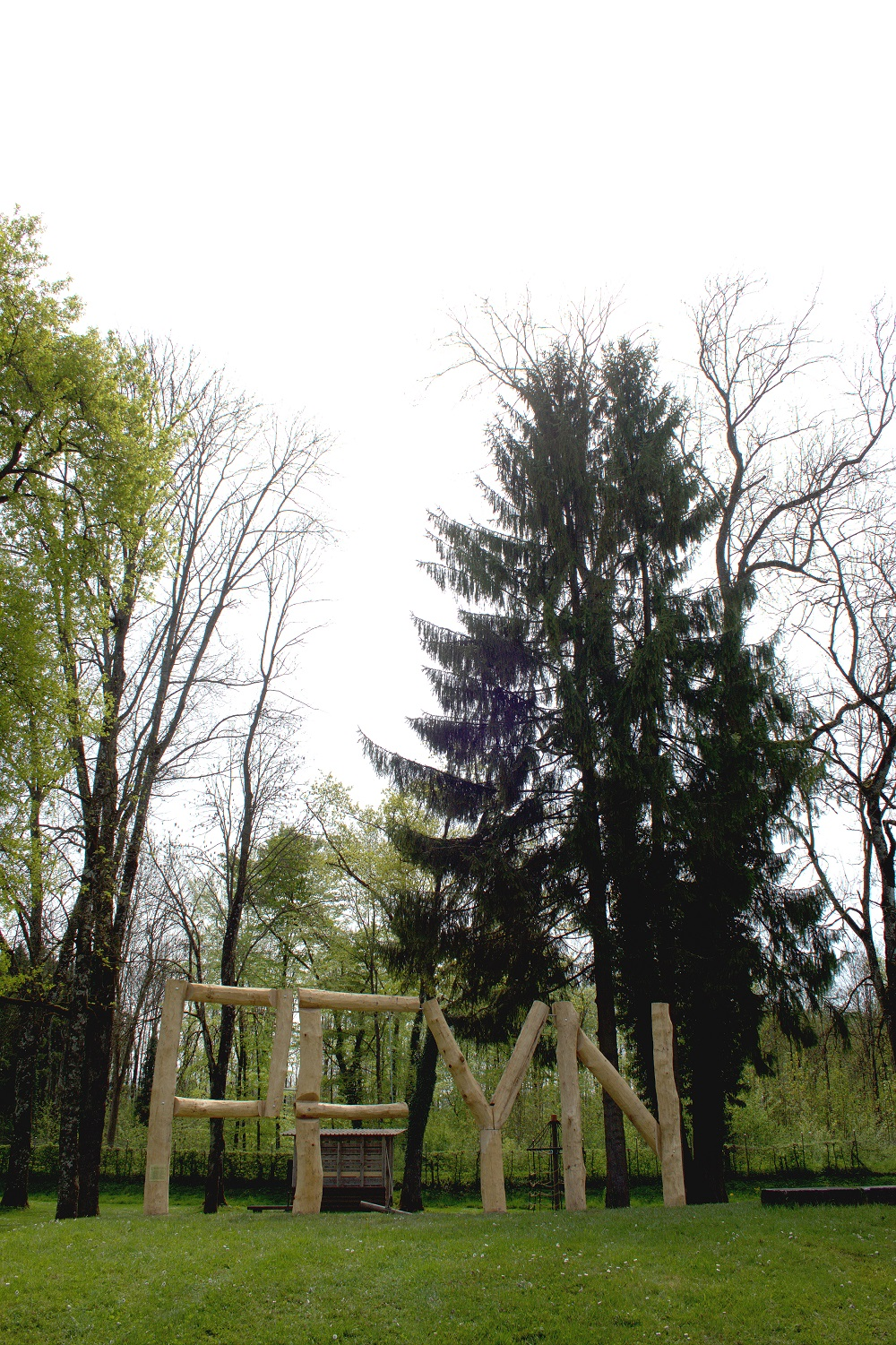
Stefano W. Pasquini, "US1105", public sculpture in Pfyn, Switzerland, 2011-2014

== Exhibitions ==
Since 1988 Pasquini exhibited in group shows in venues such as the Collective Gallery (Edinburgh), The National Portrait Gallery (London), Casco (Utrecht), ICA (London), Art in General (New York), Star67 (Brooklyn), Gallery Korea (New York), MACRO (Rome), Galleria Enrico Astuni (Bologna).
His first solo exhibition was at Carnera (Adria), in 1994, followed by a show titled "Hope and Despair" at the Bond Gallery in (Birmingham) in 1998.
Further solo exhibitions include Sesto Senso, Graffio, Villa Serena (Bologna), Studio Vetusta, Paggeriarte (Modena), MelePere (Verona), Quattrocentometriquadri (Ancona).
In 2004 he made a project about quantity that resulted in a solo exhibition, titled "2004" at Galleria 42 Contemporaneo, in Modena. In 2012 he had a solo exhibition at Siz, in Rijeka, Croatia, and in 2013 he participated to a three part exhibition curated by Kaz in London at Kingsgate Gallery.
In 2014 he finished a public project started in 2011 in Pfyn, Switzerland, that involved the local population of the small town, a time capsule and a big wooden sculpture.

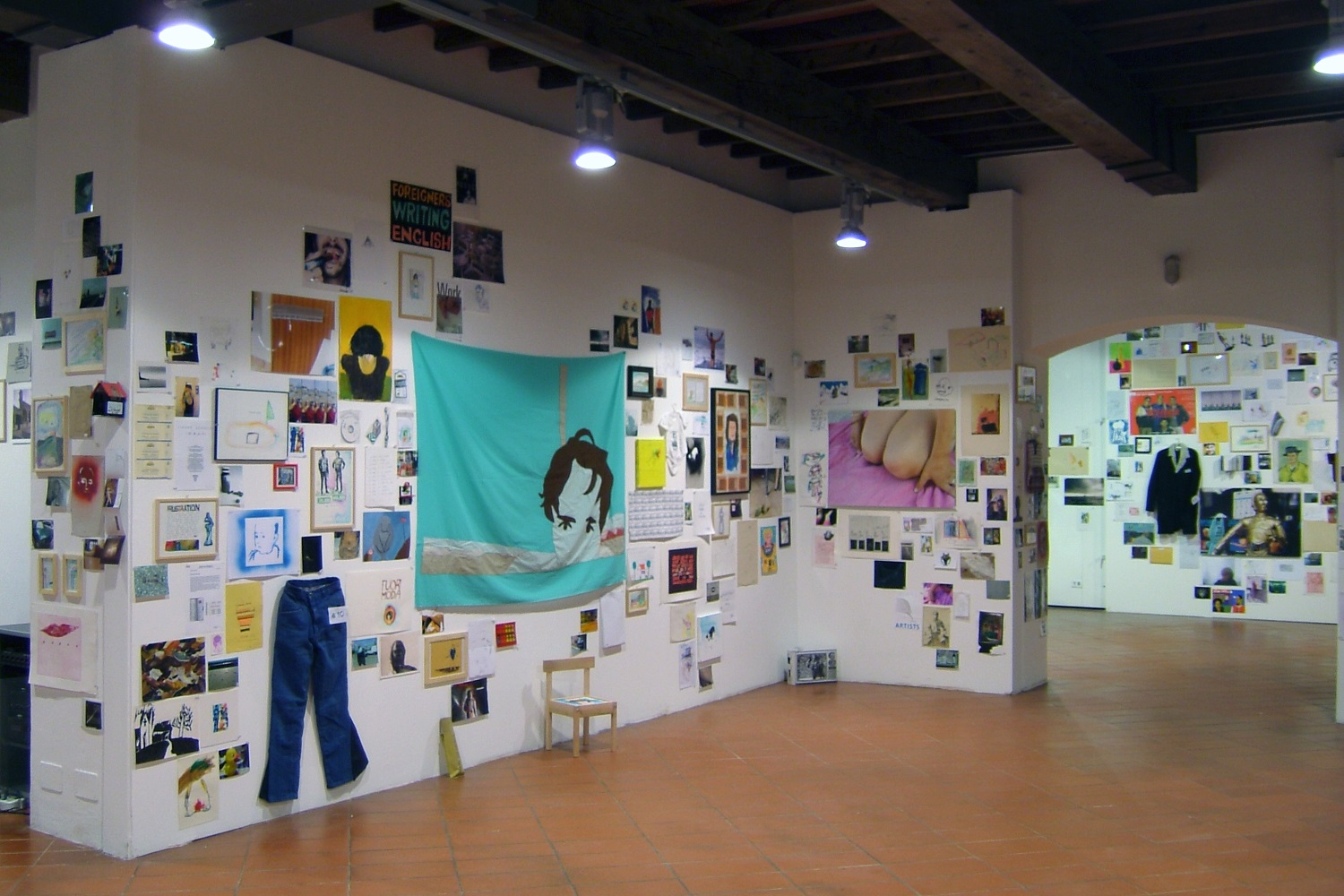
Stefano W. Pasquini, "Eclectic Discount", solo exhibition at PaggeriArte, Sassuolo (MO), Italy, 2005

== Writings ==
Since 1994 Pasquini has been writing about contemporary art in many magazines: La Stanza Rossa (Bologna, Italy), New York Arts (New York), Collezioni Sport & Street (Modena, Italy).
He is author with Frank Verpoorten of "Accidental//Coincidental", Newhouse Center for the Arts, New York, 2008.
In 2004 he published a volume on photographer Claudio Serrapica.
In 2015 he co-authored (with Maria Teresa Roberto) "Incorporeo", published by Albertina Press.

== Reviews ==
Tiziana Platzer, “Il frastuono della guerra risuona nelle ex carceri”, La Stampa, Turin, 7 November 2015.
Matteo Bianchi, “Il ferrarese Stefano Pasquini all'Art Week torinese”, La Nuova Ferrara, Ferrara, 5 November 2015.
“Luci in mostra a Molinella”, il Resto del Carlino, martedì 30 dicembre 2014, Bologna, Italy, p. 21.
Manuela Valentini, “Il diario delle medie? Si esponga”, il Resto del Carlino, Bologna, giovedì 25 settembre 2014, p. 33.
Stefano Bigazzi, "Il bosco di Parmenide, la lunga performance di Angelo Pretolani", la Repubblica Genova, venerdì 12 settembre 2014, p. X.
Mario Trombino, “Noi vogliamo la luna!”, “Rebus difficilissimo”, and “Chi resta calmo vince”, Diogene Magazine, No. 34, marzo-maggio 2014, Bologna, Italy, pp. 1, 3, 6-7, 10-11.
Christof Lampart, “Ein Römer sagt “scusi””, Thurgauer Zeitung, Thurgau, Switzerland, Dienstag 29 April 2014.
Caterina Cavina, “Stefano W. Pasquini”, Arte Contemporanea News, Anno VII numero 35 Novembre-Dicembre 2013, pp. 60–61, D'Agostino Editore, Olevano Romano (RM), Italy.
Federico Mascagni, “L'editoria indipendente si mette in mostra al Fruit” L'Unità Emilia Romagna, martedì19 marzo 2013, p. 26.
Time Out: “FrighteningFigure”, La Tribuna Provincia di Bologna, anno XVIII N° 276, October 2012, p. 14.
Manuela Valentini, “Voci come opere d'arte”, Il Resto del Carlino, Bologna edition, 4 October 2012, p. 29.
N.V.O., “Uspon i pad Berlusconija”, Novi List, Rijeka, 30 September 2012, p. 61.
Luca Rossi, “Stefano W. Pasquini e l'orizzontalità”, Juliet, n. 156, February – March 2012, pp. 77 and 91.
Manuela Valentini, “Così chiedo scusa per l'invasione romana”, Il Resto del Carlino, Bologna, 4 settembre 2011, p. 31.
Jelena Jindra, “Reci mi knjigom, ali bez Čitanja”, Globus, Broj 1058, Izdanje 0111, 18.03.2011, Zagreb, Croatia, pp. 70–73.
Luigi Meneghelli, “Stefano W. Pasquini”, Flash Art Italia, No. 290, XLIV, Milan, February 2011, p. 108.
Luiza Samanda Turrini, “Direttamente dalla luna gli oggetti di Stefano Pasquini“, L'Informazione di Modena, Anno X numero 16, 17 January 2009.
“Stefano Pasquini, apoteosi dell’oggetto”, Arte, No. 425, Milan, January 2009, p. 77.
Pilot Magazine, Issue 3, London, 2008. pp. 33–34, 59, 82-83.
Anna Caterina Bellati, “Pasquini poeta del quotidiano”, Arte, No. 393, Milano, May 2006.
Daniela Lotta, “Stefano Pasquini”, Flash Art Italia, Anno XXXVIII, N° 251, Aprile – Maggio 2005, Milan, Italy.
Michele Pompei, “Arte Urbana”, La Repubblica Bologna, September 22, 2004.
Fabiola Naldi, “Rapport 2004”, Flash Art, Anno XXXVII, n° 244, Febbrario – Marzo 2004, Milan, Italy.
Laura Taccani, “Riflessioni sugli effetti delle guerre”, City Milano, Anno 3, Numero 62, 2 Aprile 2003.
Michele Fuoco, “Il tempo rinnova la paura”, Gazzetta di Modena, Italy, 25 October 2002.
Randi Hopkins, “The Land of signs”, The Phoenix, Boston, US, May 16–23, 2002.
Soren de Melinot, “Pasquini’s Flags”, Collezioni Trends 59, Italy, SS 2002.
Paola Naldi, La Repubblica, Italy, 13 June 2001.
Juliet, 99, October–November 2000, Trieste, Italy.
La Repubblica, Italy, 16 June 2000.
Susan Hamburgher, Waterfrontweek 9.13, Williamsburg, NY, 1 July 1999.
Dario Trento, “Pasquini smista posta in galleria Sesto Senso”, La Repubblica, Italy, 24 June 1999.
Flash Art 206, International, May–June 1999.
City Lights 17, Nottingham, November 1998.
“Unrealizeable Projects“, Skin, Maastricht 1997.
“Unrealizeable Projects“, STOPSTOP, Glasgow, 1997.
Miranda Sayer, Time Out 1308, London, September 1995.
Elaine Paterson, Time Out 1206, London, October 1993.
