= Riga International Biennial of Contemporary Art =

Contemporary art biennial in Riga, Latvia

The Riga International Biennial of Contemporary Art (RIBOCA; Latvian: Rīgas Starptautiskā laikmetīgās mākslas biennāle) is an international contemporary art biennial based in Riga, Latvia. It held public editions in 2018 and 2020. A third edition planned for 2022 was postponed after Russia's invasion of Ukraine, and its reworked 2023 programme was suspended before opening.

The event was announced in 2017 as an initiative of the Riga Biennial Foundation, founded and directed by Agniya Mirgorodskaya, with a stated focus on contemporary art from the Baltic region and its international connections. It was privately funded, with Mirgorodskaya's father, Russian fishing entrepreneur Gennady Mirgorodsky, described as its chief financial backer. The financing prompted debate in Latvia before the first edition and later became central to controversy over the third.

== Establishment and funding ==
The Riga Biennial Foundation appointed Greek curator Katerina Gregos as chief curator of the inaugural edition. Gregos worked with an all-women curatorial team. The organisers said that all participating artists were paid and received per diems. The foundation presented the biennial as a platform beginning with Riga and the Baltic region before extending to wider international exchange.

Private financing supported 48 new commissions, while the origin of the principal funding prompted reservations among Latvian cultural figures. The Art Newspaper reported that national authorities were not represented at the first opening, although Riga's acting mayor attended and the biennial developed local events and partnerships. Reviews in Ocula and The Brooklyn Rail likewise discussed the tension between the event's Baltic regional aims and its Russian-linked backing.

== Editions ==
=== RIBOCA1: Everything Was Forever, Until It Was No More ===
The first edition ran from 2 June to 28 October 2018 under the title Everything Was Forever, Until It Was No More, taken from the title of a book by anthropologist Alexei Yurchak. Its theme examined rapid political, technological, ecological and social change. Gregos distributed the exhibition among eight sites in Riga and Jūrmala, including the former Faculty of Biology of the University of Latvia, the Kristaps Morbergs apartment, the former Bolševička textile factory, the Sporta 2 complex, Andrejsala and Dubulti railway station.

The programme presented 141 artworks by 104 artists and ten collectives, with a large proportion of the artists coming from the Baltic region. After it closed, organisers reported more than 55,000 visits to its exhibitions and events.

=== RIBOCA2: and suddenly it all blossoms ===
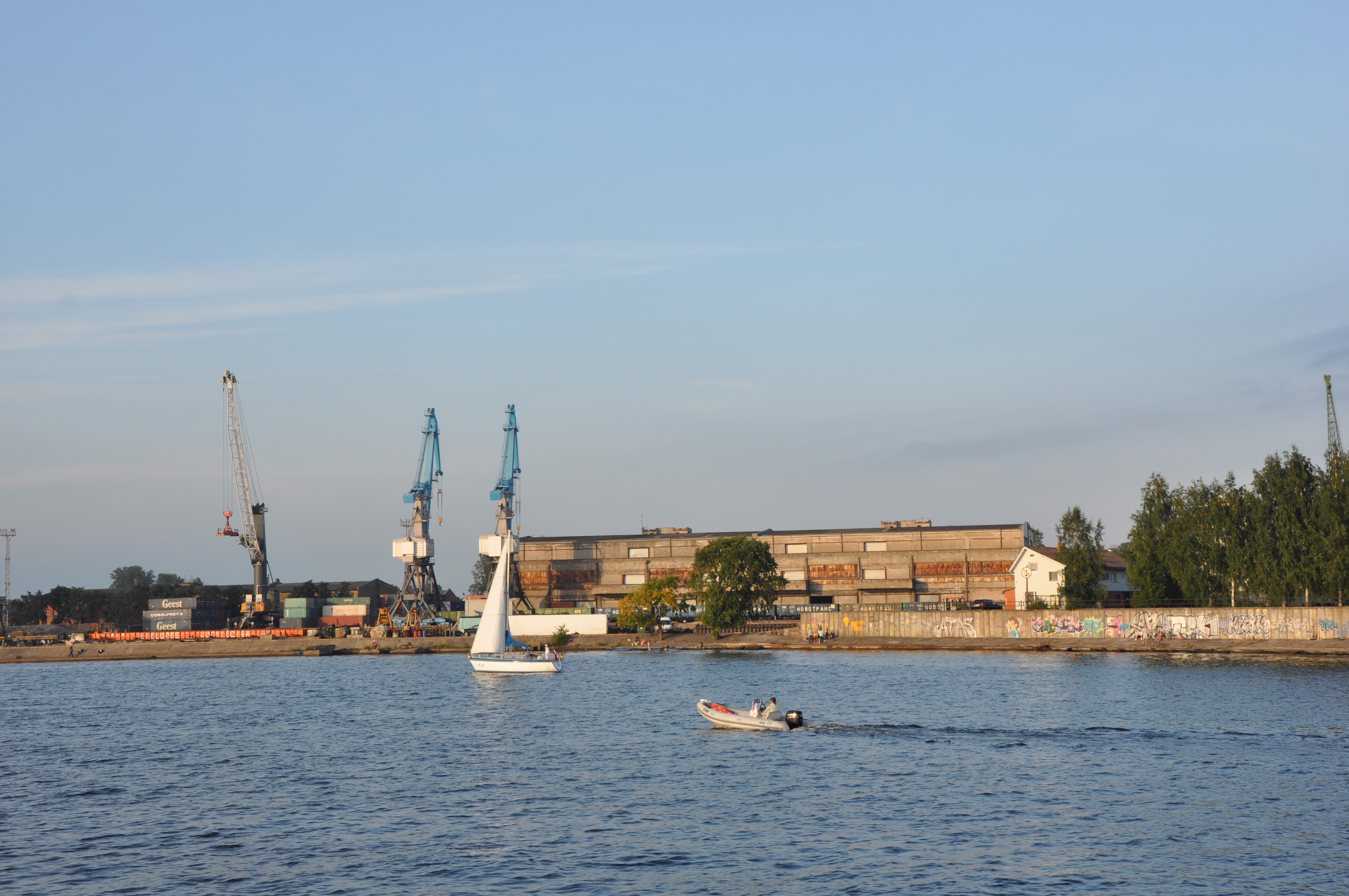
Andrejsala, which served as the principal site of RIBOCA2

The second edition, curated by Rebecca Lamarche-Vadel and titled and suddenly it all blossoms, was originally planned as a five-month exhibition opening on 16 May 2020. The COVID-19 pandemic halted installation shortly before the opening, and the project was redesigned as a reduced exhibition and the set of a feature-length film. It opened at the former industrial port of Andrejsala from 20 August to 13 September 2020.

Sixty percent of the participating artists were based in the Baltic region, and most works had been planned for local production. Travel restrictions led artists to adapt or recreate works on site at Andrejsala. Latvian filmmaker Dāvis Sīmanis worked with Lamarche-Vadel on the resulting film, also titled and suddenly it all blossoms. Organisers reported at least 21,000 visitors during the three-week run.

The film received its Latvian premiere at the Riga International Film Festival in October 2021. In a review for Kino Raksti, Elīna Reitere examined whether it functioned as an autonomous film or primarily as a record and reinterpretation of the exhibition.

=== Planned RIBOCA3 and suspension ===
The third edition, titled Exercises in Respect and curated by René Block, was scheduled for 15 July to 2 October 2022. In April 2022 the organisers postponed it to 2023 in response to Russia's invasion of Ukraine, stating that the planned celebration of art and togetherness could not proceed under those conditions. The team instead developed Common Ground, a Riga centre offering activities and working space for Ukrainian refugees.

For 2023, Block and the organisers replaced the original programme with several linked projects. They included Intermezzo at Kunsthal 44Møen in Denmark, Block's proposed Fragment exhibition in Riga, and the main project There is an Elephant in the Room, developed with the Danish collective Superflex. The Riga programme was due to begin on 10 August, but the biennial suspended it in July following renewed criticism in Latvia of the organisers' historic Russian-linked financing and institutional leadership.

The organisers said that they had revised the funding structure after the invasion but concluded that their programme might be inappropriate or unwanted in the changed circumstances. Latvian curator Žanete Liekīte, who had campaigned against the biennial, argued that the dispute concerned ethical funding, organisational transparency and attitudes toward post-colonial societies rather than the ethnicity of staff members. ArtReview reported that the biennial's future plans were unclear after the suspension.

== Reception and debate ==
Reviews of RIBOCA1 discussed its Baltic focus, use of Riga's architecture and commissioning programme, while differing over the coherence of its broad theme. Joyce Beckenstein in The Brooklyn Rail emphasised the significance of presenting Baltic artists through site-specific historical contexts. Emily McDermott in ArtReview found many individual works thought-provoking but considered the curatorial treatment of change too broad and rushed. Mitch Speed's review in Frieze placed the exhibition's artistic ambitions within the regional politics and security concerns surrounding Latvia.

The financing debate continued throughout the event's history. Early coverage recorded suspicion of Russian private backing alongside the foundation's efforts to employ Latvian and Baltic staff, artists and partner organisations. After the full-scale invasion of Ukraine, the organisers said they ended Russian funding and attempted to finance the biennial through a United States-based charity. Critics in Latvia nevertheless argued that the changes did not resolve concerns about accountability and institutional trust.
