= Estuaire (biennale) =

Estuaire (Breton: Aber) is a contemporary art exhibition that took place between Nantes and Saint-Nazaire (along the Loire estuary), France.

The first edition was held in 2007 (from June to September), the second one in 2009, and the final one in 2012. Only three editions were planned from the start. Several of the artworks created for Estuaire are still in place today between Nantes and Saint-Nazaire.
