= International Roaming Biennial of Tehran =

Multimedia art exhibition

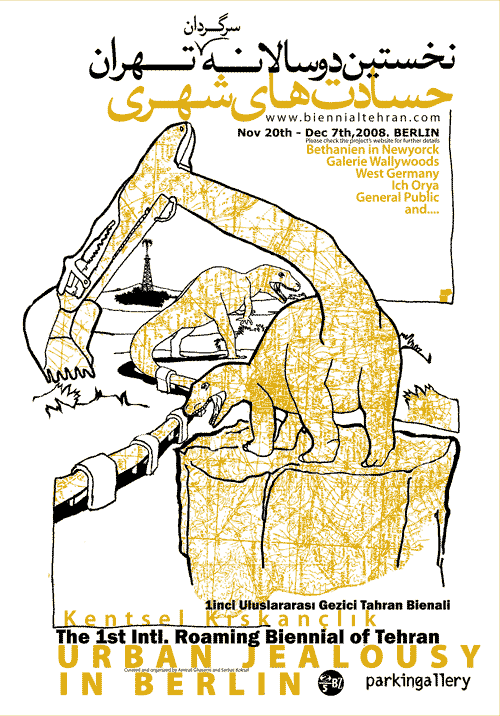

Urban Jealousy, the 1st International Roaming Biennial of Tehran was an itinerant multimedia art exhibition presented in Istanbul (Hafriyat Karaköy, May 30 - June 6, 2008), Berlin (various spaces, November 20 - December 7, 2008) and Belgrade (April 3 Apr - April 10, 2009). The Biennial was curated and organised by Amir Ali Ghassemi and Serhat Köksal.

== The Exhibition ==
Amir Ali Ghassemi and Serhat Köksal had the idea of organizing a low-cost itinerant biennial as a critique of the art situation in Tehran at the time as well as questioning the politics of the "biennalization" process which was happening at an international level.

We dreamed of traveling like nomads, carrying artworks, objects, video projectors, and texts in a package no bigger than a medium-sized suitcase.

The theme of the exhibition was "Urban Jealousy". A Jalousie window, derived from the Arabic, ‘’mashrabiyya’’ (مشربية) is a kind of window where you can see without being seen. The title represented, from the curators’ perception, the condition of many Tehran artists who could observe the world from within Iran without being involved with the outside. In this way, Iranian artists try to give us a metaphor of how the world appears through a very particular Iranian "window" of the national, ethnical and political context of Iran.

The exhibition project was announced in February 2008 through an open submission call to the internet art community. Out of 600 applications, 300 artists from over 20 countries were selected to participate.

The exhibition was organized into sections including: painting, graphic, poster, video, photography, installation, sound, objects, featuring both established and emerging artists.

Artists who participated in the First Tehran Roaming Biennial included: Gustavo Aguerre, Caterina Davinio, Clara Diebler, Gary Farrelly, Genco Gulan, Troy Henriksen, Stefano Pasquini, Kristy Perez, Pipilotti Rist, and Ala Younis.

== See also ==
- Iranian modern and contemporary art
