= Peter Feldstein (photographer) =

American photographer (1942–2017)

- Born: May 24, 1942
- Died: December 1, 2017 (aged 75)
- Education: University of Iowa
- Notable work: Oxford Project

Peter Feldstein (May 24, 1942 – December 1, 2017) was an American photographer and a professor emeritus at the University of Iowa.

== Life ==
He graduated from University of Iowa, with a Master's degree. His work can be seen in such galleries as Olson-Larsen in Des Moines, Roy Boyd in Chicago, Lieberman & Saul in New York City, Leedy-Voulkos in Kansas City, Thomas Barry Fine Arts in Minneapolis, and Richard E. Peeler Art Center at DePauw University. He also has a National Endowment for the Arts grant and two Iowa Arts Council grants with two more from Polaroid Collection.

In his The Oxford Project, he photographed people in Oxford, Iowa.

== Works ==
- Feldstein, P.; Bloom, S.G. (2010). The Oxford Project. Welcome Books. ISBN 978-1-59962-087-9.
