= Screen City Biennial =

Arts festival in Stavanger, Norway

- Predecessor: Screen City Festival
- Formation: 2017 (2013)
- Founder: Daniela Arriado
- Founded at: Stavanger, Norway
- Key people: Daniela Arriado, Vanina Saracino, Tanya Toft Ag
- Website: www.screencitybiennial.org

Screen City Biennial is an art biennial located in Stavanger, Norway, dedicated to presenting, furthering discourse and facilitating artistic practice in the expanded moving image in public space.

== About ==
Screen City Biennial is an art biennial that explores the relation between the moving image, sound, technology and architecture and presents artistic formats that seek to expand the borders of cinematic experience in public space. Explored in the legacy of expanded cinema and integrated with the urban context, as well as presented in an Online Exhibition, the biennial presents artworks of video, live cinema, art walks (mobile art), audio-visual, light art, animation, creative data visualisation, projection mapping, participatory urban media interventions, virtual and augmented reality, and computer gaming among other formats, partly invited based on an open call. With an integrated research program that "facilitates research on artistic practice and thinking and space for curatorial reflection", the Biennial presents "a new platform that works to explore uses of the moving image in contemporary artistic practice."

Screen City was founded as a festival by Daniela Arriado in 2013 and repeated in 2015, and in 2017, together with Dr. Tanya Toft Ag, it was upscaled to become the first Nordic art biennial dedicated to the expanded moving image in public space. In 2017 Screen City Biennial launched the SCB Journal. Screen City Biennial 2019 is curated by Daniela Arriado and Vanina Saracino with the topic Ecologies - lost, found and continued.

The biennial collaborates with Stavanger's art institutions and cultural venues including Stavanger Concert Hall, Tou Scene, Stavanger Art Museum, Maritime Museum, Rogaland Kunstsenter, Studio17 and the MS Sandnes Boat. Screen City Biennial is produced by Art Republic, a platform dedicated to digital art and public space.

== History ==
Screen City departs from a movement in contemporary art exhibition practices using urban screens for artistic content referred to as "screen practice" in curating. Screen City Biennial evolves from its predecessor in the Screen City Festival. This was established in 2013 in Stavanger, Norway, as a festival dedicated to the moving image, presented in public spaces - on the city's facades, shop windows and urban venues. Moving image artworks were presented via temporary "neighborhood projections" and DIY infrastructures. Screen City initially departed from temporary, bottom-up infrastructures for moving image artworks inquiring into how public space can be reshaped with media art. Since 2017 Screen City has been a biennial. The upcoming edition Ecologies - lost, found and continued will take place in Stavanger on October 17–30.

=== Screen City Biennial 2019 ===
Screen City Biennial 2019 is curated by Daniela Arriado (Norway/Chile) and Vanina Saracino (Italy/Germany) with the theme Ecologies - lost, found and continued. Screen City Biennial 2019 aims to present, facilitate and examine art and artistic inquiry questioning the effect of human action on implicated ecologies. The biennial engages a post-anthropocentric worldview searching for ecologies ‘lost’ to the dominant imaginary of the modern, rationalized Western society yet blooming on the periphery. Perhaps these peripheries are deep-rooted centres of knowledge which could guide us towards a more sustainable, conscious and spiritually anchored future, if continued. In exploring these ecologies through art, the biennial asks how non-anthropocentric positions and holistic knowledge systems can provide foundations upon which we can move forward. How can these alternative systems and positions be brought into new contexts, inspire processes of innovation, and be engaged in through art?

Artists 2019: Andrew Norman Wilson (United States) / Emilija Škarnulytė (Lithuania/Norway) / Enrique Ramírez (Chile) / Flatform (Italy) / Jonathas de Andrade (Brazil) / Band of Weeds (Finland) / Kristina Õllek (Estonia) / Mai Hofstad Gunnes (Norway) / Marjolijn Dijkman (Netherlands) and Toril Johannessen (Norway) / Michelle-Marie Letelier (Chile) / Michelle-Marie Letelier & Cristina Moreno / Momoko Seto (Japan) / Oliver Ressler (Austria) / Richard Alexandersson (Sweden) / Saara Ekström (Finland) / Sissel M. Bergh (Sápmi / Norway) / Tove Kommedal (Norway) / Tuomas Aleksander Laitinen (Finland).

More artists and the complete program are still to be announced.

=== Screen City Biennial 2017 ===
Screen City Biennial 2017 was curated by Daniela Arrado (Norway/Chile) and Dr. Tanya Toft Ag (Denmark) in October 2017. With the theme Migrating Stories, this edition takes thematic point of departure in the complexities of the topic of migration, with sub themes of Journeys, Alienation, Lost Ecologies, Diaspora and Nomadism.

Artists 2017: Budhaditya Chattopadhyay (India) / Christa Joo Hyun D’Angelo (South Korea/United States) / Dana Levy (Israel) / David Blandy (United Kingdom / Duncan Speakman (United Kingdom) / Enrique Ramírez (Chile) / Eric Corriel (United States) / Evangelia Kranioti (Greece) / HC Gilje (Norway) / John Cleater (United States) / John Craig Freeman (United States) / Larry Achiampong (United Kingdom/Ghana) / Lodovica Guarnieri (Italy) / Lorenzo Gerbi (Italy) / Lotic (United States) / Marcel Odenbach (Germany) / Marcus Neustetter (South Africa) / Margarida Paiva (Portugal/Norway) / Maria von Hausswolff (Sweden) / Matti Aikio (Norway/Finland/Sápmi) / Mirelle Borra (Netherlands) / Olivia McGilchrist (Jamaica/France) / Rona Yefman (Israel) / Sam Wolson (United States) / Shezad Dawood (United Kingdom) / Søren Thilo Funder (Denmark) / Tanja Schlander (Denmark) / Telcosystems (Netherlands) / Tobias Zielony (Germany) / Transforma (Germany) / Trevor Snapp (United States/Kenya) / Utopian Union (International) / Vasco Araújo (Portugal) / Yael Bartana (Israel) / Yucef Merhi (Venezuela)

=== Previous Editions ===
==== Screen City Festival 2015 ====
Screen City Festival 2015 was curated by Daniela Arriado (Norway/Chile) and guest curators Marin Mazanec (Czech Republic) and Eliška Děcká (Czech Republic). The 2015 Festival took a thematic point of departure in the Europe's post-industria climate as affecting Stavanger city's architectonic and social spaces.

Artists 2015: Harun Farocki (Germany) / Antje Ehmann (Germany) / Katharina Gruzei (Austria) / Rosa Barba (Italy) / Beathe C Rønning (Norway) / Matěj Al Ali (Czech Republic) / Tomáš Moravec (Czech Republic) / Dan Gregor (Czech Republic) / Michal Pustějovský (Czech Republic/United Kingdom) / Pjoni (Slovakia) / Ján Šicko (Slovakia) / Nils Henrik Asheim (Norway) / Knut Åsdam (Norway) / Martin Blažíček (Czech Republic) / Greg Pope (United Kingdom) / Veronika Vlková (Czech Republic) / Kateřina Koutná (Czech Republic) / Ane Hjort Guttu (Norway) / AniScreen (Czech Republic).

==== Screen City Festival 2013 ====
Screen City Festival 2013 was titled Shaping Public Space. Moving Cityscapes and was curated by Daniela Arriado (Norway/Chile) and Mirjam Struppek (Germany). The festival experimented with the reshaping of public space through Media Art, presenting a program of video art, animation, creative data visualizations, projection mapping and participatory urban media interventions. The 2013 Festival won the Stavanger Price [Stavangerprisen] in 2014 for presenting the best art experience in Stavanger in 2013.

Artists 2013: Bordos.ArtWorks (Hungary) / Circumstance (United Kingdom) / Greg Pope (United Kingdom) & John Hegre (Norway) / Michelle Teran (Canada) / Alan Warburton (United Kingdom) / Albert Merino (Spain) / Alice Arnold (United States) / Aline Helmcke (Germany) / Bjørn Margnhildøen (Norway) / Chris Brandl (Germany) / Dario Bardic (Netherlands) / Jaykoe (United Kingdom) / Jessica Koppe (Germany) / Jonas Brinker (Germany) / Jonathan Monaghan (United States) / Michael Pinsky (United Kingdom) / Nuno Rodriguez de Sousa (Portugal) / Mike Faulkner (United Kingdom) / Richard Vjigen (Netherlands) / Silvia Ospina (Colombia) / Zanny Begg (Australia) / Ida W.Bjørken (Norway) / Anders Elsrud Hultgreen (Norway) / Michael Szpakowski (United Kingdom) / Iselin Linstad Hauge (Norway) / Jessica Faiss (Sweden) / Jette Ellgaard (Denmark) / Jeannette Ehlers (Denmark) / Eva Olsson (Sweden) / Dodda Maggy (Iceland) / Birgitte Sigmundstad (Norway) / Magnus Sigurdarson (Iceland) / Antti Laitinen (FL) / Vibeke Jensen (Norway) / Tout court (France) / London Squared Productions (United States) / Mario Cavalli (United Kingdom) / Patrick Jean (France) / Akile Nazli Kaya (Czech Republic) / Sally Arthur (United Kingdom) / Ellie Land (Germany) / Jonathan Hodgson (United Kingdom) / Libor Pixa (Czech Republic) / Gaëlle Denis (United Kingdom/Denmark) / Trond Lossius (Norway) / Bull.Miletic (Norway).

== Location ==
The biennial is located in Stavanger, Norway. The particular context of Stavanger plays a significant conceptual role for the Screen City program. Stavanger is a harbour city placed in Southwest Norway with approx. 250,000 inhabitants. The city's rapid population growth in the late twentieth century was primarily a result of Norway's booming offshore oil industry, which remains a key industry in the Stavanger region and the city. The contrast between an old fishing and canning industry and the modern oil-related economy is highly marked in the city's landscape. Stavanger is currently undergoing rapid city development, mostly driven by the wealth from the oil industry. Like most places facing rapid growth, it meets challenges of gentrification and conflicts of interests. Hosting the Nordic Edge Expo in 2017, technology becomes the connecting channel through which artists and audiences can contemplate the consequences of Stavanger's rapid transformations.

Screen City has presented art in public space in various districts of Stavanger, in 2013 and 2015 mainly in the city's East end, what used to be a working-class neighborhood, and in 2017 along the harbour of Stavanger – Vågen.

== Themes ==
- Migrating Stories (2017): Under the title Migrating Stories, the 2017 Biennial presents expanded moving image artworks from a broad international range of artists dealing with current complexities relating to migration. Artworks reflect upon journeys, diaspora and post-colonialism, transformation of place, and ‘alien’ realities. The theme takes contemporary conditions of movement as its thematic framework for examining the complex forms of transition in all its guises – from one place to another, from one state to another, from one memory to another, and from one perceptual state to another – as a general narrative to describe our human, cultural and communicative existence today.
- Shaping Public Space - Moving Cityscapes (2013): The theme explores different perspectives on how to construct and de-construct the city. It compares the spatial practice of everyday life with the representations of space, how we perceive our city and how we conceptualise it, speaking to changing visions for the urban context of Stavanger.
- Labour and the City - In Between (2013): The theme considers how a post-industrial climate has left us with conflicting definitions of labour, exploitation of labour and an unknown economic future, and how these industrial changes affect a city's architectonic and social spaces.
