= British Poetry Revival =

Poetry movement

The British Poetry Revival is the general name now given to a loose movement in the United Kingdom that took place in the late 1960s and 1970s. The term was a neologism first used in 1964, postulating a New British Poetry to match the anthology The New American Poetry (1960) edited by Donald Allen.

The Revival was a modernist-inspired reaction to the Movement's more conservative approach to British poetry. The poets included an older generation—Bob Cobbing, Paula Claire, Tom Raworth, Eric Mottram, Jeff Nuttall, the Finnish poet Anselm Hollo, Andrew Crozier, the Canadian poet Lionel Kearns, Lee Harwood, Allen Fisher, Iain Sinclair—and a younger generation: Paul Buck, Bill Griffiths, John Hall, John James, Gilbert Adair, Lawrence Upton, Peter Finch, Ulli Freer, Ken Edwards, Robert Gavin Hampson, Gavin Selerie, Frances Presley, Elaine Randell, Robert Sheppard Paul Evans, Adrian Clarke, Clive Fencott, Maggie O'Sullivan, Cris Cheek, Tony Lopez and Denise Riley.

== Beginnings ==
Poets associated with the British Poetry Revival generally looked to modernist models, such as the American poets Ezra Pound, William Carlos Williams and Charles Olson and British figures such as David Jones, Basil Bunting and Hugh MacDiarmid. By the beginning of the 1960s a number of younger poets were starting to explore poetic possibilities that these older writers had opened up. They included Roy Fisher, Gael Turnbull, Ian Hamilton Finlay, Bob Cobbing, Jeff Nuttall, Tom Raworth, Michael Horovitz, Eric Mottram, Peter Finch, Edwin Morgan, Jim Burns, Elaine Feinstein, Lee Harwood, and Christopher Logue.

Many of these poets joined Allen Ginsberg and an audience of 7,000 people at the Albert Hall International Poetry Incarnation on 11 June 1965 to create what has often been claimed inaccurately as the first British happening. As Juha Virtanen observes, 'Despite being credited as a happening ... the proceedings of the Incarnation primarily consisted of individual poetry readings. Earlier British happenings included John Latham's event-based art and Skoob Tower ceremonies; Gustav Metzger's 1964 auto-destructive art; Adrian Henri's 1962 collage-events in Liverpool's The Cavern Club; and Jeff Nuttall's events in Better Books. They had their roots in Dada events at the Cabaret Voltaire in Zürich at the start of the century.

Fisher, a professional jazz pianist, applied the lessons of William Carlos Williams's Paterson to his native Birmingham in his long poem City. Turnbull, who spent some time in the USA, was also influenced by Williams. His fellow Scots Morgan and Finlay both worked with found, sound and visual poetry. Mottram, Nuttall, Horovitz and Burns were all close to the Beat Generation writers. Mottram and Raworth were also influenced by the Black Mountain poets; while Raworth and Harwood shared an interest in the poets of the New York School.

Publishing outlets for this new experimental poetry included Turnbull's Migrant Press, Raworth's Matrix Press and Goliard Press, Horovitz's New Departures, Stuart Montgomery's Fulcrum Press, Tim Longville's Grosseteste Review, Galloping Dog Press and its Poetry Information magazine, Pig Press, Andrew Crozier and Peter Riley's The English Intelligencer, Crozier's Ferry Press, and Cobbing's Writers Forum. Many of these presses and magazines also published avant-garde American and European poetry. The first representative anthology of the new movement was Horovitz's Children of Albion: Poetry of the Underground in Britain (1969). A broader view of the first and second generations of the Revival is in the sections edited by Eric Mottram and Ken Edwards in The New British Poetry (1988). Robert Sheppard also provides an account of some of this activity in his chapter "The British Poetry Revival" in his book, The Poetry of Saying (Liverpool University Press, 2005)', while Juha Virtanen wrote a Revival monograph, Poetry and Performance During the British Poetry Revival 1960-1980 (Palgrave Macmillan, 2017).

== England ==
=== London ===
Thanks in no small part to Cobbing's Writers Forum and its associated writers' workshop, London was a hub for many young poets, including Bill Griffiths, Paula Claire, Allen Fisher, Iain Sinclair, Gilbert Adair, Lawrence Upton, Peter Finch, Ulli Freer, Gavin Selerie, Frances Presley, Elaine Randell, Robert Sheppard, Adrian Clarke, Clive Fencott, Maggie O'Sullivan, cris cheek, Tony Lopez and Denise Riley. Some sense of the atmosphere of this period is provided by the series of reminiscences included in CLASP: late modernist poetry in London (Shearsman, 2016), edited by Robert Hampson and Ken Edwards, and in Ken Edwards's memoir, Wild Metrics.

Griffiths writes a poetry of dazzling surface and deep political commitment that incorporates such matter as his professional knowledge of Anglo-Saxon and his years as a Hells Angel. Both Sinclair and Fisher share a taste for William Blake and an interest in exploring the meaning of place, particularly London, which can be seen in Sinclair's Suicide Bridge and Lud Heat and Fisher's Place sequence of books. O'Sullivan explores a view of the poet as shaman in her work, while Randell and Riley were among the first British women poets to combine feminist concerns with experimental poetic practice. For more on Griffiths's poetry, see William Rowe (ed.), Bill Griffiths (Salt, 2007). For more on Sinclair, see Robert Sheppard, Iain Sinclair (Northcote House, 2007) or Brian Baker, Iain Sinclair (Manchester UP, 2007). For Fisher, see Robert Hampson and cris cheek (eds), The Allen Fisher Companion (Shearsman, 2020).

Griffiths started Pirate Press to publish work by himself and others. Allen Fisher set up Spanner for similar reasons, and Sinclair's early books were published by his own Albion Village Press, which also published work by Chris Torrance and Brian Catling. Book production has always been an important part of Revival practice. Many of these writers also participated enthusiastically in performance poetry events, both individually or in groups like Cobbing's Bird Yak and Konkrete Canticle.

Eric Mottram was a central figure on the London scene, both for his personal and professional knowledge of the Beat Generation writers and the US poets linked with the New American Poetry more generally, and his abilities as a promoter and poet. In large part through Mottram's presence there, King's College London was another important site for the British Poetry Revival. Poets who attended there (a number of them also students taught by Mottram) included Gilbert Adair, Peter Barry, Sean Bonney, Hannah Bramness, Clive Bush, Ken Edwards, Bill Griffiths, Robert Gavin Hampson, Jeff Hilson, Will Rowe, and Lawrence Upton.

=== Northern England ===
By the early 1950s, Basil Bunting had returned to live in Newcastle and, in 1966, Fulcrum Press published Briggflatts, which is widely considered to be his masterpiece. A number of younger poets began to gather around Bunting. In 1963, Connie and Tom Pickard started a reading series and bookshop in the Morden Tower Book Room. The first reading was by Bunting, and Ginsberg. Robert Creeley, Lawrence Ferlinghetti and Gregory Corso and the Canadian poets Gerry Gilbert and Lionel Kearns all read there. They were soon joined by Richard Caddel, brought up in Kent but an honorary Northumbrian, Barry MacSweeney and Colin Simms. For some reminiscences of this scene, see the essays by Connie Pickard, Tony Baker, and Tom Pickard in Geraldine Monk (ed.) CUSP: recollections of poetry in transition (Shearsman, 2012).

Through Bunting, these younger writers became familiar with the work of the Objectivist poets. Specifically, Louis Zukofsky and Lorine Niedecker were to become important models for Caddel and Simms in their writing about the Northumbrian environment, while John Seed picked up on George Oppen. Pickard and MacSweeney shared Bunting's interest in reviving Northumbrian vowel patterns and verbal music in poetry and all of these poets were influenced by the older poet's insistence on poetry as sounded speech rather than purely written text.

At Easter, 1967 MacSweeney organised the Sparty Lea Poetry Festival. This was a ten-day session of reading, writing and discussion. The participants, including the Pickards, MacSweeney, Andrew Crozier, John James, John Temple, Pete Armstrong, Tim Longville, Peter Riley, John Hall, J. H. Prynne and Nick Waite, stayed in a group of four cottages in the village of Sparty Lea. This has often been presented as a pivotal event in the British Poetry Revival, bringing together poets who were separated geographically and in terms of poetic influences and encouraging them to support and publish each other's work.

Although published by Writers Forum and Pirate Press, Geraldine Monk is very much a poet of the North of England. Like Maggie O'Sullivan, she writes for performance as much as for the page and there is an undercurrent of feminist concerns in her work. Other poets associated with the North of England included Paul Buck, Glenda George, and John Seed. Paul Buck and Glenda George for many years edited Curtains, a magazine instrumental in disseminating contemporary French poetry and philosophical/theoretical writing. John Seed had picked up on Objectivism while still in the North-East. Geraldine Monk's edited collection of reminiscences by various Northern poets (including Jim Burns, Paul Buck, Glenda George, and John Seed, CUSP, mentioned above, provides a rich account of innovative poetry outside the metropolis.

=== Cambridge ===
The Cambridge poets were a group centred around J. H. Prynne and included Andrew Crozier, John James, Douglas Oliver, Veronica Forrest-Thomson, Peter Riley, Tim Longville and John Riley. Prynne was influenced by Charles Olson and Crozier was partly responsible for Carl Rakosi's return to poetry in the 1960s. The New York school were also an important influence for many of the Cambridge poets - most obviously in the work of John James. The Grosseteste Review, which published these poets, was originally thought of as a kind of magazine of British Objectivism. The early formation of this group is evidenced in the pages of The English Intelligencer, a privately circulated worksheet published between January 1966 and April 1968. It was founded by Andrew Crozier, who edited the first and third series; the second series was edited by Peter Riley. Contributors and recipients included Peter Armstrong, Jim Burns, Elaine Feinstein, John Hall, John James, Tim Longville, Barry MacSweeney, J. H. Prynne, Tom Raworth, John Temple, Chris Torrance and Nick Wayte.

The Cambridge poets in general wrote in a cooler, more measured style than many of their London or Northumbrian peers (although Barry MacSweeney, for example, felt an affinity with them) and many taught at Cambridge University or at Anglia Polytechnic. There was also less emphasis on performance than there was among the London poets.

== Wales and Scotland ==
In the 60s and early 70s Peter Finch, an associate of Bob Cobbing, ran the No Walls Poetry readings and the ground breaking inclusive magazine, second aeon. He began Oriel Books in Cardiff in 1974 and the shop served as a focal point for young Welsh poets. However, some of the more experimental poets in Wales were not of Welsh origins. Two of the most important expatriate poets operating in Wales were John Freeman and Chris Torrance. Freeman is another British poet influenced by the Objectivists, and he has written on both George Oppen and Niedecker.In 1985, he edited Not Comforts / but Visions, essays on the poetry of George Oppen, which included work by John Seed, Jeremy Hooker, Freeman, Hampson and others. Torrance has expressed his debt to David Jones. His ongoing Magic Door sequence is widely regarded as one of the major long poems to come out of the Revival. For some account of this period, see the reminiscences of Chris Torrance and Peter Finch in Geraldine Monk's CUSP: recollections of poetry in transition (Shearsman, 2012).

In Scotland, Edwin Morgan, Ian Hamilton Finlay and Tom Leonard emerged as key individual poets during this time, each interested in, among other forms, sound and visual poetry. The viability of a wider, deeper experimental infrastructure in poetry was helped by the gallery, performance space and bookshop at the Third Eye Centre in Glasgow (later renamed the Centre for Contemporary Arts). Magazines such as Scottish International, "Chapman", and Duncan Glen's magazine Akros maintained links with the modernist legacy of the inter-war and post-war years while publishing contemporary poets; often, however, by mixing the avant-garde with aesthetically conservative texts.

In a similar vein, in 1972-4 John Schofield, then a post-graduate student, organised three annual poetry festivals in various halls at Edinburgh University, called POEM 72, POEM73 and POEM74. Poets reading their work at the first included Edwin Morgan, Norman MacCaig, Tom Buchan, Robert Garioch and Liz Lochhead. About 700 people attended. For POEM73, the attendance was over 1300 people, hearing Hugh MacDiarmid, George MacBeth, Adrian Mitchell, Jon Silkin and Iain Crichton Smith. The final festival, POEM74, included readings by Adrian Henri, Libby Houston, Jeff Nuttall, Rose McGuire, Frances Horovitz, Ruth Fainlight and Sorley Maclean.

== "A treacherous assault on British poetry" ==
In 1971, a large number of the poets associated with the British Poetry Revival joined the dormant, if not moribund Poetry Society and in the elections became the Poetry Society's new council. The Society had been traditionally hostile to modernist poetry, but under the new council this position was reversed. Eric Mottram was made editor of the society's magazine Poetry Review. Over the next six years, he edited twenty issues that featured most, if not all, of the key Revival poets and carried listings of books and magazines from the wide range of small presses that had sprung up to publish them.

Nuttall and MacSweeney both served as chairperson of the society during this period and Bob Cobbing used the photocopying facilities in the basement of the society's building to produce Writers Forum books. Around this time, Cobbing, Finch and others established the Association of Little Presses (ALP) to promote and support small press publishers and organise book fairs at which they could sell their productions.

In the late 1970s, in response to the number of 'foreign poets' being featured in Poetry Review, Mottram was removed as editor of the magazine; his editorial practices being seen by the Arts Council as "a treacherous assault on British poetry", according to Mottram's preface to his section of the anthology, the new british poetry. in which he outlines some of the breadth of poetic activity from which this loose grouping emerged. An archive-based, event-history approach to subsequent events is provided by Peter Barry in his book Poetry Wars: British poetry in the 1970s and the Battle of Earls Court (Salt, 2006). An account of this 'battle' from the other side is provided by James Sutherland Smith, where his comparison of the brief takeover of the Poetry Society to an attempt "by the Militant Tendency to take over the Rotary Club" suggests some of the political and class issues around At around the same time, the Arts Council also set up a top-down inquiry that overturned the result of the Society's elections that had once more brought in a council dominated by those sympathetic to the Poetry Revival. As a result of the Arts Council setting aside the votes of the members, many of the members boycotted the Society. Robert Sheppard has provided a useful critique of Barry's account and of the tactics of the committee members: as a representative of a younger generation of poets, who had grown up through Cobbings's writers forum workshops, whose 'linguistically innovative poetry' was more akin to LANGUAGE poets than to the New American Poetry, and felt the boycott was a tactical error.

== The 1980s and after ==
A number of younger poets, many of whom who first found an outlet in Poetry Review under Mottram, began to emerge around the end of the 1970s. In London, Bill Griffiths, Ulli Freer, cris cheek, Lawrence Upton, Robert Gavin Hampson, Robert Sheppard, and Ken Edwards were among those who were to the fore. These, and others, met regularly at Gilbert Adair's Subvoicive reading series, which also regularly featured poets from North America, as well as visiting poets such as Caroline Bergvall, Paul Buck, Andrew Duncan, D. S. Marriott, Maggie O'Sullivan and Denise Riley. Edwards ran Reality Studios, a magazine that grew out of Alembic (UK poetry magazine), the magazine he had co-edited through the 1970s with Peter Barry and Robert Hampson. Through Reality Studios, he helped introduce the L=A=N=G=U=A=G=E poets to a British readership. He also ran Reality Street Editions with Cambridge-based Wendy Mulford, which continued to be a major publisher of contemporary poetry until 2018 and an important bridge between US and UK poetries. The London-based Angel Exhaust magazine brought many of the younger poets together – in particular, Adrian Clarke, Robert Sheppard and Andrew Duncan. In the Midlands, Tony Baker's Figs magazine focused more on the Objectivist and Bunting-inspired poetry of the Northumbrian school while introducing a number of new poets.

In 1988 an anthology called The New British Poetry was published. It featured a section on the Revival poets edited by Mottram and another on the younger poets edited by Edwards. In 1987, Crozier and Longville published their anthology A Various Art, which focused mainly on the Cambridge poets, and Iain Sinclair edited yet another anthology of Revival-related work Conductors of Chaos (1996). For an account of some of the work produced by these poets, see Robert Hampson and Peter Barry (eds.), The New British poetries: the scope of the possible (Manchester University Press, 1993). In 1994 W. N. Herbert and Richard Price co-edited the anthology of Scottish Informationist poetry Contraflow on the SuperHighway (Gairfish and Southfields Press).

The anthology Conductors of Chaos featured another aspect of the Revival; the recovery of neglected British modernists of the generation after Bunting. Poets David Gascoyne, selected by Jeremy Reed; W. S. Graham, selected by Tony Lopez; David Jones, selected by Drew Milne; J.F. Hendry, selected by Andrew Crozier and Nicholas Moore, selected by Peter Riley were reappraised and returned to their rightful place in the history of 20th century British poetry. Another interesting development was the establishment of the British and Irish poetry discussion list by Richard Caddel. This continued, for some decades, to provide an international forum for discussion and the exchange of news on experimental British and Irish poetry. Much wider publication for Revival poetry was arranged via the USA. Caddel, together with Peter Middleton, edited a selection of new UK poetry for US readers in a special issue of Talisman (1996). With Peter Quartermain Caddel also edited Other: British and Irish Poetry since 1970 (USA, 1999); while Keith Tuma's Anthology of Twentieth-Century British and Irish Poetry (Oxford University Press, USA, 2001) incorporates this poetry into a wider retrospective of the whole century.

Into the 1990s and beyond poets including Johan de Wit, Sean Bonney, Jeff Hilson and Piers Hugill have surfaced after direct involvement in the Cobbing-led Writers Forum workshop. A sub-development of the workshop was the instigation of the Foro De Escritores workshop, in Santiago, Chile, run on similar aesthetic principles. This workshop has contributed to the development of Martin Gubbins, Andreas Aandwandter and Martin Bakero. Those associated with the Barque Press (most obviously Andrea Brady and Keston Sutherland), and more recently Bad Press (in particular, Marianne Morris and Jow Lindsay), have made a similar impact via the Cambridge scene. Perdika Press in North London has been instrumental in bringing to wider attention contemporary Modernist writers such as Nicholas Potamitis, Mario Petrucci, Robert Vas Dias and Peter Brennan; the press was also responsible for the first publication in Britain of Bill Berkson. From Scotland, Peter Manson, who had co-edited the magazine Object Permanence in the mid-1990s, Drew Milne, editor of Parataxis, David Kinloch and Richard Price (previously editors of Verse and Southfields) also emerged more fully as poets in their own right. New writings have arisen from the involvement of cris cheek, Bridgid Mcleer and Alaric Sumner, under the direction of Caroline Bergvall and John Hall through the Performance Writing programme at Dartington College of Arts including Kirsten Lavers, Andy Smith, and Chris Paul; from the involvement of Redell Olsen in the MA in Poetic Practice at Royal Holloway, University of London, including Becky Cremin, Frances Kruk, Ryan Ormond, Sophie Robinson, John Sparrow and Stephen Willey; and through Keith Jebb at University of Bedfordshire's Creative Writing programme, including Alyson Torns and Allison Boast.

== See also ==
- Children of Albion: Poetry of the Underground in Britain
- Black Mountain poets
- Language poetry
- The Movement
- Situationism
