= Anthology of Twentieth-Century British and Irish Poetry =

Anthology of Twentieth-Century British and Irish Poetry is a poetry anthology edited by Keith Tuma, and published in 2001 by Oxford University Press. Tuma is an American academic, and author of the somewhat despairing Fishing by Obstinate Isles: Modern and Postmodern British Poetry and American Readers (1998), on the topic of the perceived gap between 'mainstream' British poetry and the possible American reception (particularly in academia). The choice of poets (it, clearly enough, operating at the level of poets as much as poems) is therefore some gesture at remedying a gulf supposed to have opened when Ezra Pound left London for Paris.

== Poets in Anthology of Twentieth-Century British and Irish Poetry ==
- Fleur Adcock
- Moniza Alvi
- W. H. Auden
- Samuel Beckett
- Asa Benveniste
- Caroline Bergvall
- James Berry
- Eavan Boland
- Jean "Binta" Breeze
- Basil Bunting
- Mary Butts
- Brian Catling
- cris cheek
- Austin Clarke
- Bob Cobbing
- Brian Coffey
- Andrew Crozier
- Nancy Cunard
- David Dabydeen
- Elizabeth Daryush
- Donald Davie
- Walter de la Mare
- Denis Devlin
- Keith Douglas
- Carol Ann Duffy
- T. S. Eliot
- William Empson
- Elaine Feinstein
- Ian Hamilton Finlay
- Allen Fisher
- Ford Madox Ford
- Veronica Forrest-Thomson
- David Gascoyne
- W. S. Graham
- Robert Graves
- Bill Griffiths
- Thom Gunn
- Ivor Gurney
- Alan Halsey
- Thomas Hardy
- Tony Harrison
- Lee Harwood
- Randolph Healy
- Seamus Heaney
- W. N. Herbert
- F. R. Higgins
- Geoffrey Hill
- Gerard Manley Hopkins
- Ted Hughes
- T. E. Hulme
- John James
- Elizabeth Jennings
- Linton Kwesi Johnson
- David Jones
- Trevor Joyce
- Patrick Kavanagh
- Jackie Kay
- Thomas Kinsella
- Rudyard Kipling
- Frank Kuppner
- R. F. Langley
- Philip Larkin
- D. H. Lawrence
- Tom Leonard
- Liz Lochhead
- Tony Lopez
- Mina Loy
- Norman MacCaig
- Hugh MacDiarmid
- Helen Macdonald
- Somhairle MacGill-Eain
- Thomas MacGreevy
- Sorley Maclean
- Joseph Gordon Macleod
- Louis MacNeice
- Barry MacSweeney
- Charles Madge
- Derek Mahon
- E. A. Markham
- Medbh McGuckian
- Charlotte Mew
- Christopher Middleton
- Drew Milne
- Geraldine Monk
- Harold Monro
- John Montague
- Nicholas Moore
- Edwin Muir
- Paul Muldoon
- Grace Nichols
- Maggie O'Sullivan
- Wilfred Owen
- Clere Parsons
- Tom Pickard
- F. T. Prince
- Craig Raine
- Tom Raworth
- Peter Reading
- Peter Redgrove
- Carlyle Reedy
- Denise Riley
- John Riley
- Peter Riley
- Lynette Roberts
- John Rodker
- Isaac Rosenberg
- Siegfried Sassoon
- Tom Scott
- Maurice Scully
- Jo Shapcott
- Robert Sheppard
- Jon Silkin
- C. H. Sisson
- Edith Sitwell
- Stevie Smith
- Dylan Thomas
- Edward Thomas
- Charles Tomlinson
- Rosemary Tonks
- Gael Turnbull
- Catherine Walsh
- Sylvia Townsend Warner
- Anna Wickham
- John Wilkinson
- W. B. Yeats
- Benjamin Zephaniah

(A note in the book's introduction indicates that J. H. Prynne was originally included in the anthology but had to be omitted because of the author's refusal of permission.)

== See also ==
- 2001 in poetry
- 2001 in literature
- List of poetry anthologies
- English poetry
- Irish poetry
