= Objectivism (poetry) =

Modernist movement that emerged in the 1930s

The Objectivists were a loose-knit group of second-generation Modernist poets who emerged in the 1930s, members of a poetic movement within the broader movement of literary Modernism known as Objectivism. The group consisted primarily of American nationals and was influenced by Ezra Pound and William Carlos Williams, among other contemporaneous writers. The basic tenets of Objectivist poetics, as defined by Louis Zukofsky, were to treat the poem as an object and to emphasize sincerity, intelligence, and the poet's ability to look clearly at the world. While the name of the movement is the same as that of Ayn Rand's school of philosophy, the two movements are not affiliated.

The core group consisted of the Americans Zukofsky, Williams, Charles Reznikoff, George Oppen and Carl Rakosi, and the British poet Basil Bunting. Later, another American poet, Lorine Niedecker, became associated with the group. A number of other poets were included in early publications under the Objectivist rubric without actually sharing the attitudes and approaches to poetry of this core group. Although these poets generally suffered critical neglect, especially in their early careers, and a number of them abandoned the practice of writing and/or publishing poetry for a time, they were to prove highly influential for later generations of writers working in the tradition of modernist poetry in English.

== Roots ==
The period 1909 to 1913 saw the emergence of Imagism, the first consciously avant garde movement in 20th century English-language poetry. Pound, who was Imagism's prime mover, served as foreign editor of Harriet Monroe's magazine Poetry. In October 1912, he submitted three poems each by H.D. and Richard Aldington under the label Imagiste. Aldington's poems were printed in the November issue, and H.D.'s appeared in the January 1913 issue. The March 1913 issue of Poetry also contained Pound's A Few Don'ts by an Imagiste and F. S. Flint's essay Imagisme. This publication history meant that this London-based movement had its first readership in the United States. It also meant that Imagism was available as a model for American Modernist poets of the next generation.

Zukofsky was one such poet. He published a poem in Poetry in 1924 and introduced himself to Pound in 1927, when he sent the older poet his "Poem beginning 'The,'". Pound published the poem in his magazine The Exile, and a long correspondence and friendship between the two began. This relationship was strengthened by Zukofsky's 1929 essay on Pound's long work in progress The Cantos. Pound also provided an introduction to William Carlos Williams, a physician and poet who had been a classmate of Pound's while at the University of Pennsylvania and who lived in Rutherford, New Jersey, not far from Zukofsky. Zukofsky and Williams quickly became close friends and were to be literary collaborators for the rest of Williams's life. Another of Zukofsky's literary mentors at this period was Charles Reznikoff, a New York City poet whose early work was also influenced by Imagism. By 1928, the young American poet George Oppen and his wife Mary Oppen had become friendly with Zukofsky and Reznikoff. Another young American poet, Carl Rakosi, started corresponding with Pound around this time, and the older poet again recommended him to Zukofsky. The final member of the core group, Basil Bunting, was an English poet who came from a Quaker background and who had been imprisoned as a conscientious objector during World War I. In 1923, Bunting met Pound in Paris and the two men developed a close literary friendship, with Bunting living near Pound at Rapallo from 1931 to 1933. In 1930, Bunting published his first collection of poetry, Redimiculum Matellarum, and Pound introduced him to Zukofsky.

The term 'Objectivist' developed because Harriet Monroe insisted on a group name for the February 1931 issue of Poetry: A Magazine of Verse, which Monroe had allowed Zukofsky to guest edit, at Pound's urging. Zukofsky recounts the occasion with Monroe in Prepositions: "Harriet Monroe at the time insisted, we'd better have a title for it, call it something. I said, I don't want to. She insisted; so, I said, alright, if I can define it in an essay, and I used two words, sincerity and objectification, and I was sorry immediately. But it's gone down into the history books; they forgot the founder, thank heavens, and kept the terms, and, of course, I said objectivist, and they said objectivism and that makes all the difference. Well, that was pretty bad, so then I spent the next thirty years trying to make it simple." It also seems that the core group did not see themselves as a coherent movement but rather as a group of individual poets with some shared approach to their art. As well as the matters covered in Zukofsky's essays, the elements of this approach included: a respect for Imagist achievement in the areas of vers libre and highly concentrated language and imagery; a rejection of the Imagists' interest in classicism and mythology; for Reznikoff, Zukofsky, Rakosi and Oppen, a shared Jewish heritage (which, for all but Oppen included an early childhood in which English was not their first language); generally left-wing, and, in the cases of Zukofsky, Rakosi, and Oppen at least, Marxist politics.

== Early publications ==
The first appearance of the group was in a special issue of Poetry magazine in February 1931; this was arranged for by Pound and edited by Zukofsky (Vol. 37, No. 5). In addition to poems by Rakosi, Zukofsky, Reznikoff, George Oppen, Basil Bunting and William Carlos Williams, Zukofsky included work by a number of poets who would have little or no further association with the group: Howard Weeks, Robert McAlmon, Joyce Hopkins, Norman Macleod, Kenneth Rexroth, S. Theodore Hecht, Harry Roskolenkier, Henry Zolinsky, Whittaker Chambers, Jesse Lowenthal, Emanuel Carnevali (as translator of Arthur Rimbaud), John Wheelwright, Richard Johns and Martha Champion. An appendix (Symposium) featured texts by Parker Tyler and Charles Henri Ford, with a note by Zukofsky, a text by Samuel Putnam and Zukofsky's translation of a short essay on the poetry of André Salmon by his friend René Taupin.

The issue also contained Zukofsky's essays Program: 'Objectivists' 1931 and Sincerity and Objectification: With Special Reference to the Work of Charles Reznikoff, a reworking of a study of Reznikoff's work originally written some time earlier. In this second essay, Zukofsky expands on the basic tenets of Objectivist poetics, stating that in sincerity "Writing occurs which is the detail, not mirage, of seeing, of thinking with the things as they exist, and of directing them along a line of melody", and that objectification relates to "the appearance of the art form as an object." This position echoes Pound's 1918 dictum (in an essay, "A Retrospective", in which he is looking back at Imagism) "I believe in technique as the test of a man's sincerity".

=== Some example poems ===
As an example, Zukofsky cites the following short section from A Group of Verse, a long poem sequence that was Reznikoff's contribution to the issue:

Among the heaps of brick and plaster lies
a girder, still itself among the rubbish.

In which the girder among the rubbish represents –for Zukofsky– the poem as object, sincere in itself. Oppen continued to refer to these lines as a poetic touchstone as late as 1976, though he would often misremember them as "a girder, still itself among the rubble."

Oppen's own contribution was a poem titled "1930s", later collected (without the title) as the opening section of Oppen's first collection called Discrete Series, a book-length poem sequence.

The knowledge not of sorrow, you were
saying, but of boredom
Is — aside from reading speaking
smoking —
Of what, Maude Blessingbourne it was,
wished to know when, having risen,
“approached the window as if to see
what really was going on”;
And saw rain falling, in the distance
more slowly,
The road clear from her past the window-
glass —
Of the world, weather-swept, with which
one shares the century.

Of his own poetry, Zukofsky chose to include "A" — Seventh Movement, the first part of a six-page section from what was to become an 800-page poem. This extract takes as its subject a set of roadworks in the street outside his New York home:

Horses: who will do it? out of manes? Words
Will do it, out of manes, out of airs, but
They have no manes, so there are no airs, birds
Of words, from me to them no singing gut.
For they have no eyes, for their legs are wood,
For their stomachs are logs with print on them;
Blood red, red lamps hang from necks or where could
Be necks, two legs stand A, four together M.
"Street Closed" is what print says on their stomachs;
That cuts out everybody but the diggers;
You're cut out, and she's cut out, and the jiggers
Are cut out. No! we can't have such nor bucks
As won't, tho they're not here, pass thru a hoop
Strayed on a manhole — me? Am on a stoop.
extract from "A"-7 by Louis Zukofsky

=== Language and poetry ===
Another aspect of Objectivist poetics that is not explicitly addressed in these essays is an interest in exploiting the resonances of small, everyday words. As Zukofsky was to write some time later (in 1946), "a case can be made for the poet giving some of his life to the use of the words the and a: both of which are weighted with as much epos and historical destiny as one man can perhaps resolve. Those who do not believe this are too sure that the little words mean nothing among so many other words." This concern is also reflected in Oppen's statement "if we still possessed the word 'is', there would be no need to write poems".

=== Reaction ===
Reaction to the issue was not uniformly welcoming, and the March 1931 issue of the magazine contained a hostile response by the editor herself under the title "The Arrogance of Youth". Monroe was particularly angered by Zukofsky's rejection of Edwin Arlington Robinson, Robert Frost, Edgar Lee Masters, and Edna St. Vincent Millay, all of whom were regular contributors to the magazine. However, not all reactions were so unfavorable; Niedecker read the issue at her local public library in Fort Atkinson, Wisconsin, and wrote to Zukofsky shortly thereafter, beginning a friendship and frequent literary correspondence that would last until her death 40 years later.

The Poetry issue was followed in 1932 by the Zukofsky-edited An 'Objectivist' Anthology. This anthology featured far fewer contributors: Basil Bunting, Mary Butts, Frances Fletcher, Robert McAlmon, George Oppen, Ezra Pound, Carl Rakosi, Kenneth Rexroth, Charles Reznikoff, William Carlos Williams, Louis Zukofsky and Forest Anderson, T. S. Eliot, R. B. N. Warriston and Jerry Reisman. The anthology served to highlight the differences between these poets as much as their shared attitudes to writing. Much of the difference stemmed from Zukofsky's insistence on form over content, which conflicted with many of the other poets' concern with the real world. As Rakosi would later write: "if Reznikoff was an Objectivist, Zukofsky is not and never was one."

An Objectivist Anthology was published by To, Publishers, a small press organized by Zukofsky, Reznikoff and George and Mary Oppen, and funded from Oppen's small private income. Zukofsky acted as general editor from New York City, for which he drew a small monthly salary, and the Oppen's arranged for the books' typesetting and printing from Le Beausset, a small village in the south of France where the Oppens were living. The press also published A Novelette and Other Prose (1932) by Williams and Prolegomena 1 (1932) by Ezra Pound. This was a reprint of two of Pound's prose books, How to Read and The Spirit of Romance, bound in one volume. While the press had ambitious plans, planning to print Williams' uncollected prose, Pound's complete critical works, Bunting's translation of Italian poet Federigo Tozzi, Zukofsky's 55 Poems, and at least one book by Reznikoff, the press ran into several problems, and folded late in 1932 before any more volumes appeared.

The Oppens returned to the United States in 1932 and, together with Zukofsky, Williams, and Reznikoff, went on to form the Objectivist Press to publish more books of Objectivist work. The first titles to appear were Williams' Collected Poems 1921–31 (1934), with an introduction by Wallace Stevens, Oppen's Discrete Series, with an introduction by Ezra Pound, followed by Reznikoff's Jerusalem the Golden, (1934, poetry), his Testimony, (1934, prose), with an introduction by Kenneth Burke and his In Memoriam: 1933 (1934, poetry). Reznikoff's Separate Way (1936) was the last publication of The Objectivist Press, not counting Zukofsky's A Test of Poetry (1948), which was published under its imprint twelve years later.

== Aftermath of Objectivism ==
In 1935, the Oppens joined the Communist Party of America, and George abandoned poetry in favor of political activism. In 1950, the couple moved to Mexico to escape the strongly anti-Communist political atmosphere of the times. It would be 1958 before Oppen wrote any further poetry. The Oppens returned to New York in 1960, and George went on to publish six books of poetry between 1962 and 1978, by which time he was finding it increasingly difficult to write—he had Alzheimer's disease. He won the Pulitzer Prize in 1969 for Of Being Numerous. Mary Oppen published an account of their life, including a close-up view of the Objectivist period, in her 1978 memoir Meaning a Life. George Oppen died in 1984, and Mary died in 1990.

After publishing his 1941 Selected Poems, Carl Rakosi also abandoned poetry, dedicating himself to a career as a social worker. Shortly after turning 21, Rakosi had legally changed his name to Callman Rawley under which name he served as the head of the Minneapolis Jewish Children's and Family Service from 1945 until his retirement in 1968. An unexpected letter received from the English poet Andrew Crozier in 1965 about his early poetry encouraged Rakosi to start writing and publishing poetry again. A collection, Amulet, was published by New Directions Publishers in 1967, and a number of other volumes were to appear over the following 46 years. These included his Collected Poems in 1986. Rakosi died in 2004, aged 100.

After Redimiculum Matellarum, Bunting's next book publication was Poems: 1950. After a lively decade spent largely working in Iran for the British foreign service and The Times of London, Bunting returned to live in his native Northumbria after his expulsion from Iran in 1952 by Mossadeq, and the 1960s were to prove to be a very productive decade for him. Publications from this time include possibly his best-known work, the long poem Briggflatts (1966), described by critic Cyril Connolly as "the finest long poem to have been published in England since T. S. Eliot's Four Quartets", and Collected Poems (1968, revised editions 1978 and 1985). An Uncollected Poems appeared in 1991 and his Complete Poems in 2000.

In 1933, Niedecker visited Zukofsky in New York, where she and Zukofsky were rumored to have had a brief affair. She soon returned to her home in rural Wisconsin, a landscape that was to influence much of her later writing. Her first book, New Goose, was published by the James A. Decker Press in 1946. As was the case for many of the other Objectivists, a combination of critical neglect and personal circumstances meant that this early publication was followed by a longish period of poetic silence during which she was unable to find a publisher for her work. Although she continued writing for much of the intervening period, her next book, My Friend Tree, did not appear until 1961. She published relatively frequently after that, and her Collected Works appeared in 2002.

In 1941, Reznikoff published a collection of poems called Going To and Fro and Walking Up and Down. After that, although he continued to write and to publish in periodicals, his poetry had no further book publication until the 1959 Inscriptions: 1944–1956. In 1962, New Directions published a selection of poems called By the Waters of Manhattan. Three years later, they brought out Testimony: The United States, 1885–1890: Recitative, the first installment of a long work based on court records covering the period 1855 to 1915. The book was a commercial and critical flop, and New Directions dropped him. In the 1970s, Black Sparrow Press started publishing Reznikoff, bringing out the complete Testimony as well as a similar work, Holocaust, based on courtroom accounts of Nazi concentration camps. In the years after Reznikoff's death in 1976, Black Sparrow brought all his major works back into print.

Zukofsky had begun work on a long poem in 24 parts called A in 1927. The first seven "movements" of this work appeared in the Objectivist Anthology, having previously appeared in magazines. These early sections show the influence of The Cantos, though Zukofsky was to further develop his own style and voice as A progressed. The 1930s also saw him continue his involvement in Marxist politics, an interest that went back to his college friendship with Whittaker Chambers.

Although he would continue to write short poems and prose works, notably the 1963 Bottom: On Shakespeare, the completion of A was to be the major concern of the remainder of Zukofsky's writing life. As the poem progressed, formal considerations tended to be foregrounded more and more, with Zukofsky applying a wide range of devices and approaches, from the sonnet to aleatory or random composition. The final complete edition was going to press as the poet lay on his deathbed in 1978. His final written work was the index to this volume.

== Legacy ==
The early critical reception of the Objectivists was generally hostile, particularly in reviews by Morris Schappes and Yvor Winters, as well as Harriet Monroe's already-mentioned unfavorable reaction to the Poetry special issue. However, they did have an immediate impact, especially on the work of their two Imagist mentors, Williams and Pound. Williams and Zukofsky were to maintain a lifelong personal and creative relationship which was to prove important for both men. For Zukofsky, the example of Williams helped to keep him focused on external realities and things. For Williams, Zukofsky served as a reminder of the importance of form. As Mark Scroggins writes, "from Zukofsky, Williams learned to shape his often amorphous verse into more sharply chiselled measures."

Pound, too, was influenced by the Objectivist sense of form, their focus on everyday vocabulary, and their interests in politics, economics and specifically American subject matter. The critic Hugh Kenner has argued that these influences helped shape the sections of The Cantos published during the 1930s, writing "Pound was reading them, and they him".

The poets of the Beat Generation, a group of American bohemian writers to emerge at the end of the 1940s that included Allen Ginsberg, Gary Snyder and Jack Kerouac, owed much to Pound and Williams, and were led, through them, to the Objectivists. In the 1950s and 1960s, Zukofsky was sought out by younger poets including Paul Blackburn, Jerome Rothenberg, Jonathan Williams, Denise Levertov, Gilbert Sorrentino and Allen Ginsberg. His work was also well known to the Black Mountain poets, especially Robert Creeley and Cid Corman, whose Origin magazine and press were to serve as valuable publishing outlets for the older poet.

Zukofsky's formal procedures, especially his interest in aleatory writing, were a key influence on Jackson Mac Low and John Cage, amongst others, and through them on the Language School, an avant garde group of poets who started publishing in the 1970s and who included Bruce Andrews, Charles Bernstein, Ron Silliman, Lyn Hejinian, Bob Perelman, Michael Palmer, Rae Armantrout, Carla Harryman, Barrett Watten, Clark Coolidge, Hannah Weiner, Susan Howe, Tina Darragh and Fanny Howe.

Oppen and Reznikoff influenced subsequent generations of poets, most notably, Theodore Enslin, Harvey Shapiro, Michael Heller, Norman Finkelstein, Rachel Blau DuPlessis, John Taggart, and Armand Schwerner to name a few. Their poetry continues the Objectivist obsession with language, ethics, and world and often addresses modern, urban, Jewish life, both secular and religious. DuPlessis, on first glance, seems an exception to this list. Her poetry seems not to immediately possess the so-called themes of an Objectivist aesthetic as practiced in the work of a Reznikoff, a Niedecker or an Oppen.

As a young woman and university student, DuPlessis began a lifelong correspondence with Oppen and was deeply influenced by Oppen's integrity, sincerity, and courage. Though establishing herself as a poet with tendencies and obsessions at some remove from an Objectivist ethos (or so it may be argued at a first reading) DuPlessis has played a crucial role in the dissemination and survival of Objectivist poetry and poetics well into the 21st century. The life of a man such as Oppen made a lasting impression on DuPlessis. DuPlessis gained Oppen's trust as well and she was given the opportunity of editing Oppen's Selected Letters, which were published posthumously.

Bunting's physical presence in Newcastle in the 1960s, together with his close relationships with a number of younger poets (including Tom Pickard, Thomas A. Clark, Richard Caddel and Barry MacSweeney), meant that he was a major father figure for the poets of the British Poetry Revival. This younger generation were also drawn to the works of the other Objectivists, and their writings began to be more widely known in Britain. For example, it was a letter from the Revival poet Andrew Crozier which prompted Rakosi's return to poetry.

Amidst the continuous reappraisals of the legacy and literary formation of the Objectivists, a well known mapping of the territory continues to be one put forth by poet Ron Silliman: "three-phase Objectivism". Though unclear, who coined the phrase, this rubric offers a useful way of dealing with the intercession of the Objectivist poets into our consciousness. Writes Silliman:

: .. the process requires you to position yourself within the terrain of a poetics. All any literary formation is, in one sense, is just such a process carried out consciously, collectively & in public.

To see that, one need only look at the three broad phases of Objectivism –

- § The 1930s, interactivity, optimism, joint publishing projects, critical statements, recruiting (Niedecker)
- § The 1940s & ‘50s, almost totally receding, with several Objectivists either not publishing and even not writing for long periods of time
- § 1960s onward, the emergence & success of these writers precisely as a literary formation
