= Tom Pickard =

English poet and filmmaker

Tom Pickard (born 1946, Newcastle upon Tyne, England) is a poet, and documentary film maker who is an important initiator of the movement known as the British Poetry Revival.

== Biography ==
Born Thomas McKenna, he was raised by his mother's maternal aunt, Catherine McKenna Pickard (1898-1990) Tom Pickard grew up in the working-class suburbs of Cowgate, Newcastle upon Tyne, and Blakelaw and left school at the age of 14. Three years later he met Basil Bunting and was instrumental in the older poet's return to writing in the early 1960s, leading to the latter's most acclaimed poem, the long, autobiographical Briggflatts, published in 1966. The association also produced Bunting's scathing "What the Chairman told Tom" ("I want to wash when I meet a poet.... my twelve-year-old can do it - AND rhyme!")

In 1963, with his first wife Connie, Pickard founded and ran the Morden Tower Book Room, where he organised a series of readings by British and American modernist tradition poets, including Bunting. He also set up the Ultima Thule Bookshop - specialising in poetry, music and alternative counter-culture publications - between 1969 and 1973. During this period he also travelled in the United States to give performances and renew friendships with some of the American Morden Tower readers, including Allen Ginsberg, Robert Creeley and Ed Dorn. Allen Ginsberg said of him: "I am an old admirer of Tom Pickard's poetry and believe as does Basil Bunting that he is one of the most live and true poetic voices in Great Britain."

With his wife Connie he organised a benefit to raise funds and express solidarity during a long weekend in Newcastle in 1972 for the miners during their first national strike since 1926. Performers at the event included the poets Christopher Logue, Hamish Henderson, Tony Harrison, Eric Mottram, Jeff Nuttall, Barry MacSweeney, Andrew Wylie, Victor Bockris, Jon Silkin and singers Paul Jones, Alan Hull and Alex Glasgow. The Boldon Colliery brass band also played at the event.

In 1974, his television play Squire was broadcast by the BBC and starred his friend, the singer songwriter Alan Hull—who wrote music for the play. The two friends also worked together on Pickard's BBC radio documentary, The Jarrow March (1976).

Unable to find work in the North-East, Pickard moved to London in 1973 and started writing and directing radio and documentary film scripts. His film credits include We Make Ships (1988), Channel 4; Tell Them in Gdansk (1989), Channel 4. The end of shipbuilding on the River Wear was announced in December 1988, but many shipyard workers refused to give up the fight. This film centres on a party held for the redundant shop stewards and their families and combines the music of the Flying Pickets and the humour of comedian Mike Elliott to illustrate the ironies of the closure. The title highlights Mrs Thatcher's support for the striking shipyard workers in Gdańsk while shutting down UK yards; Birmingham Is What I Think With (1991), Arts Council England--about the poet Roy Fisher; The Shadow and the Substance (1994), Channel 4. The Shadow and the Substance (the title is a quote from John Clare’s poem on enclosure) examined the nature of work in an increasingly high-tech environment. In the film Rosemary Cramp, Emeritus Professor of Archaeology at Durham, discusses the basic human need and dignity in "labour" in prehistoric times as do redundant shipyard workers from Sunderland and Tyneside. This was contrasted with the "psychic need" to work as seen by the Adam Smith Institute justifying the paying of slave labour wages. It also featured the Bishop of Durham, David Jenkins, on the morality of the poor stealing food. The Durham Miners’ Gala featured Tony Benn speaking about privatisation eroding morality and citizenship. Young women working at a new Fujitsu semiconductor plant situated in a former mining area are asked if they feel secure in their jobs. This was to be the future, replacing mining and heavy industry. Their manager admits "humans contaminate the product". (The factory later closed with a loss of 600 jobs during Tony Blair’s premiership.) The film concludes with a visit to the philosopher Andre Gorz who predicts the collapse of "work" and posits a radical alternative for trade unionist and socialists.

Pickard was series editor and director of film inserts on Word Of Mouth, a series of ten 30-minute TV programs for Border TV/Arts Council England. Word of Mouth won a gold medal in 1990, at the New York International Film And TV Festival, for the best performing arts series, and was a runner-up for a Royal Television Society award.

In London he collaborated with Moira Kelly of Air Gallery to run an international poetry series (which later transferred to the Riverside Studios under David Gotthard), as well as running a book-stall in Camden Lock market.

From 1976 to 1981 Pickard lived most of the time in Warsaw with his Polish wife and witnessed the rise of the Solidarność movement.

Pickard's poetry owes much to his reading of Bunting, the Objectivist poets and of the Black Mountain poets, but is also rooted in his own urban working-class Tyneside background. His publications include High on the Walls (1968), The Order of Chance (1971), Hero Dust: New and Selected Poems (1979), Tiepin Eros: New and Selected Poems (1994), fuckwind (1999) Hole in the Wall: New and Selected Poems (2002), The Dark Months of May (2004) and Ballad of Jamie Allan (2007); the last three published in Chicago by Flood Editions. Ballad of Jamie Allan was a finalist for the 2007 National Book Critics Circle Award. His part-autobiographical More Pricks Than Prizes was published in Boston by Pressed Wafer in 2010. His poem sequence "Lark and Merlin", published in Poetry in 2010, won the Bess Hokin Prize in 2011.

In 2004 Pickard was commissioned by Sage Gateshead and Folkworks to write a libretto, Ballad of Jamie Allan, for the composer John Harle. The opera was premiered in 2005. A CD of Ballad of Jamie Allan (with Omar Ebrahim, Sarah Jane Morris, Kathryn Tickell, Bill Paterson, the Northern Sinfonia with Steve Lodder and Neil MacColl).

Pickard collaborated with John Harle again in 2009, writing the words for A Song for London Bridge, a piece for saxophone and choir and organ. It had its premiere on 22 June at Southwark Cathedral with Harle on saxophone, the King's College Choir, Cambridge, conducted by Stephen Cleobury and with the organ played by David Goode.

Pickard has worked throughout his career with many musicians, including Alan Hull (of Lindisfarne), Peter Kirtley and Liane Carroll, Jed Grimes, Ben Murray and—Rosie Doonan and the folk band Tarras among others. Pickard worked with Paul McCartney editing his long poem, "Standing Stone". McCartney said of Pickard's Fuckwind (Etruscan Books 1999): "This collection of poems and songs soars over the fells, screetching truth, sex, humour, anger and love. With sharp vision Tom dissects his gut reaction and reminds us to appreciate the cool clear beauty of our own situation." The singer Annie Lennox praised his collection Dark Month's of May (Flood Editions 2004).

His work has appeared in the London Review of Books and in Alan Moore's Dodgem Logic.

In August 2015, Pickard was one of 20 authors of Poets for Corbyn, an anthology of poems endorsing Jeremy Corbyn's campaign in the Labour Party leadership election.

== Books ==
Poetry

- 1967: High On The Walls, Fulcrum Press, London
- 1971: The Order of Chance, Fulcrum Press, London
- 1973: Dancing Under Fire, Middle Earth Books, Philadelphia
- 1979: Hero Dust, New and Selected, Allison and Busby, London
- 1980: Ok Tree, Pig Press, Durham
- 1985: Custom & Exile, Allison and Busby, London
- 1994: Tiepin Eros, Bloodaxe Books, Newcastle upon Tyne
- 1994 Hidden Agenda: My Manifesto for the leadership of the Labour Party, InFolio, Cambridge
- 1999: fuckwind, etruscan books, Buckfastliegh
- 2002: Hole In The Wall, New and Selected, Flood Editions, Chicago
- 2004: Tyne Txts with Bill Griffiths, Amara Imprint, Seaham
- 2004: The Dark Months of May, Flood Editions, Chicago
- 2008: The Ballad of Jamie Allan, Flood Editions, Chicago
- 2014: hoyoot: Collected Poems and Songs, Carcanet, Manchester
- 2016: Winter Migrants, Carcanet, Manchester
- 2017: Fiends Fell, Flood Editions, Chicago

Oral history, memoir, fiction

- 1971: Guttersnipe, City Lights, San Francisco
- 1982: Jarrow March, Allison & Busby, London
- 1989: We Make Ships, Secker & Warburg, London
- 2009: Work Conchy, The Beat Scene Press, Coventry
- 2010: More Pricks Than Prizes, Pressed Wafer, Boston
