= Clive Fencott =

English writer, poet, and academic

P. Clive Fencott (born 13 May 1952) is a writer and sound poet, a performer associated with the British Poetry Revival, and an academic.

Fencott was born in Lydney and began writing poetry in the mid-1960s while studying at art college. In 1974 he attended experimental poetry workshops at the Poetry Society organised by Bob Cobbing. From this he developed an interest in improvised vocal performance and went on to perform around Britain, Europe and the US, particularly at sound poetry festivals. He later worked with Bob Cobbing, and also with cris cheek and Lawrence Upton in the performance group JGJGJG, of which he was a founder member.

In the 1970s and 1980s his work was published by small press companies such as: Writers Forum, Pirate Press, Underwich Editions and Bluff Books; and magazines Rawz, Poetry Information, words worth, and Pod. In the early 1990s he began an association with Bill Griffiths, producing two co-written pieces for performance: The Dinosaur Park and Variations on the Life of Cuthbert. Since then his writing has concerned extended poetic prose pieces.

In 1987 he moved to the North East of England to take up an academic post at Teesside Polytechnic (later Teesside University), where he has remained as a lecturer and a researcher in digital media and video game theory in the School of Computing. He received a PhD in virtual reality theory in 2003 and has over forty academic publications to his name.

== Poetry and prose ==
- The Legends of Jack O'Kent; Gronc Press, 1978.
- Blues, Roots, Legends, Shouts and Hollers; Starborne Productions, 1980, (LP).
- Cobbing and Fencott at Florida State University; (Video online).
- Non Hysteron Proteron; Underwhich Editions, 1984.
- The Dinosaur Park (with Bill Griffiths); Micro Brigade, 1992.
- Variations on the Life of Cuthbert (with Bill Griffiths); Amra Imprint, 1992.

== Academic publications ==
- Fencott, C. "A Methodology of Design for Virtual Environments" in Virtual Technologies: Concepts, Methodologies, Tools, and Applications; Information Science Reference, IGI, 2008
- Fencott, C. Perceptual Opportunities: A Content Model for the Analysis and Design of Virtual Environments; PhD Thesis, University of Teesside, 2003
- Fencott, C. "Virtual 'Saltburn by the Sea': Creative content design for Virtual Environments" in Creating and Using Virtual Reality: a Guide for the Arts and Humanities; Oxbow Books, 2003
- Fencott, C. "Virtual Storytelling as Narrative Potential: Towards an Ecology of Narrative" in Virtual Storytelling: Using Virtual Reality Technologies for Storytelling; LNCS 2197, Springer, Berlin, 2001
- Fencott, C. "Towards a Design Methodology for Virtual Environments" in Proceedings of the International Workshop on User Friendly Design of Virtual Environments; York, England, 1999
- Fencott, C. Formal Methods for Concurrency; Thomson International Publishers, London, 1996
