= Lawrence Upton =

British poet (1949–2020)

Lawrence Upton (born London 1949, of Cornish origins, died at home 16 February 2020), was a poet, graphic artist and sound artist, and director of Writers Forum.

Upton was a performer, continuing and expanding the performance tradition of, amongst others, Bob Cobbing. He was active in London poetry and experimental music from the 1960s. He spent much of the first decade of this century in Cornwall; but was a Fellow of Goldsmiths, University of London from Spring 2008 until Autumn 2015, an AHRC fellow for the first three years and then as a visiting fellow.

== Life and work ==
Lawrence Upton first came to public attention in the early 1970s, performing his poetry widely throughout Britain. That poetry, later largely rejected by the poet himself, was often darkly humorous and disturbing. There were political overtones to much of it. He was also something of an activist, speaking often at meetings of small press operators and at the then Poets Conference. He was Secretary of the Association of Little Presses of Great Britain from 1972-77, working alongside Bill Griffiths.

He abandoned performance for some years. During that period, he reinvented his style and subject matter to speak of natural phenomena - animals of the urban city and people in desolate landscapes. This reinvention of his style has been a feature of his career.

In 1972, his sound poetry on recording tape which he had been making since the middle of the 1960s led to an invitation to be guest composer at Fylkingen in Stockholm where he worked for relatively short periods, on and off, for five years from 1974.

At about the same time, he was elected to the General Council of The Poetry Society and immediately further elected by the Council on to the society's executive. The next year he was elected the society's deputy chairman, a post he held for some time (1974-77). He served under three chairs: Laurence Cotterell, Jeff Nuttall and Barry MacSweeney before resigning (1978). His essay "So many things" discusses issues arising from that period (in "CLASP: late modernist poetry in London in the 1970s", edited by Robert Hampson and Ken Edwards; Shearsman, Bristol; ISBN 9781 84861 460 4). He founded and ran the bookshop of the Society, rebadged the National Poetry Centre and was an active member of The Printshop where he helped to produce the society's publications and those of the general public who came in with manuscripts.

Meanwhile, his reputation had grown, reinvented again as a maker of text-sound composition, with live and recorded performances in Stockholm and elsewhere. He had in 1976 co-founded the very influential sound poetry performance group jgjgjg (with PC Fencott and cris cheek), which blazed a trail through Europe's avant-garde scene and then disbanded in less than 3 years. Cobbing published him in Kroklok magazine and also proposed that the two make a booklet together to be published by Writers Forum. The booklet, called Furst Fruts of 77, was one of the press's best sellers ever.

1978 saw an end to Upton's visits to Fylkingen and a major argument with Cobbing but he continued to make sound works and to perform live multi-media work. This work was poorly documented but audio tapes have been available from the press Typical Characteristic. His books Mutation and Morning Humming from Zimmer Press and Lobby Press respectively date from that period and point to a further change in style. He visited and performed in Canada and the U.S. and was included in McCaffery and Nicholl's Sound Poetry: A Catalogue.

In 1980, Upton completed a BA degree in English Literature and History at Kingston Polytechnic and fell in love with a married woman. Both events had major effects upon his life and writing. Upton had left school with almost no qualifications but acquired a taste for study in the late 1970s. After his BA and a PGCE at Kingston, he went on to take an MA in English and American Literature at King's college, London, and has spoken often of the experience of being taught about Melville by the famous Eric Mottram.

His relationship took him out of circulation in the poetry world for many years. When the two were finally apart, a confidant wrote that "it seems to have lasted as long as a world war, but I feel that more people have died."

In 1981, Upton had a substantial exhibition under the title Deteriorating Texts at the LYC Museum and Art Gallery in Cumbria. Galloping Dog Press published a book. After that, he self-published if at all, but in his apparent silence, as well as living a suburban life, he took a series of school-teaching jobs including Head of Media Studies at Spencer Park School (1982-86) and at John Archer School (1986-7). He then completed a Dip.Ed in Computer Science at King's College, London (1987-8) and became Lecturer in Computer Science at Carshalton College (1988-91) and then Head of Academic Computing there (1992-96). As a result of these new skills, he reappeared in the poetry world with In Praise of John Coltrane which had been largely computer generated with code the poet wrote himself.

In 1990 he founded the magazine RWC and later the press Mainstream. A renewed friendship with Bob Cobbing led to the publication of two volumes of apparently autobiographical verse, Messages To Silence and Unsent Letters which he had been writing since the late 1980s. This was followed by another volume from Form Books, Letters To Eric, different in verse method and apparently more reliably autobiographical with references to marital breakup. In interview, however, Upton has said that the narrators of all his poems are unreliable.

From 1992 to 1994, he was a member of the committee that ran Subvoicive Poetry (alongside Robert Sheppard and Ulli Freer). He subsequently ran Subvoicive Poetry single-handed from 1994 to 2005. Apart from the regular poetry reading series, which took place at a series of London pubs (including the White Swan in Covent Garden and the Betsy Trotwood), he also organised six SVP colloquia between 1996 and 2002.

From 1994 until the end of the century he and Cobbing wrote a collaborative visual poem called Domestic Ambient Noise, now out of print, which has been highly praised. It is more than 2000 pages long and came in 300 pamphlets each of which was performed somewhere by the two. In 2010, Writers Forum republished the two's "Collaborations for Peter Finch".

That collaborative writing was done increasingly at a distance as ill-health obliged Upton to flee the city. From the mid-1990s his poems tended to be written in the Pennines and the remoter parts of Cornwall. (His family come predominantly from west Cornwall and the Isles of Scilly.)

In the late 1990s the Canadian housepress invited him to submit poetry for publication. The result, a poem called "house", led to another invitation and another publication "Sta!". By the time housepress closed, Upton had published over a dozen titles with the press. For some time he was published by No Press, from the same editor.

In 1998 Writers Forum published Word Score Utterance Choreography edited by Cobbing and Upton and described by Cobbing as a primer for the performance of visual poetry as sound poetry. This is a task no one else has attempted and it has been influential. Though continuing to perform with Cobbing, Upton sought solo performances and collaborations with other artists. His 2001 book Initial Dance led to a research project at Chisenhale Dance Space in London. He had made many visits to North America and has a wide range of collaborations behind him.

In 2000, he performed with Bob Cobbing on a number of occasions, including the weekend celebration of the completion of Domestic Ambient Noise. One of the performances that weekend included Derek Shiel at The Klinker, Islington, London.

At the same time, the publication of Meadows by Writers Forum in 2000 and of Wire Sculptures by Reality Street in 2003 confirmed the quality of his writing on the page. Stylistically neither book is much like anything he had published before. The range of his approaches and frequent changes of direction have made acceptance slow. More recently, Writers Forum published "Snap shots and video" and Veer Publications "a song and a film".

He continuously surprised his readers through a constant shift of form and content. In the last several years of his life he spoke and wrote on the poetry of Bob Cobbing and Alaric Sumner and on the use of digital technology in making poetry. He also engaged in a number of collaborations: with the musician John Levack Drever, the book artist Guy Begbie, the poet and artist Richard Tipping, the musician Benedict Taylor and the poet Tina Bass.

For some years, between performances, Lawrence Upton withdrew to Cornwall, where accommodation was provided for him. It was said that he had become something of an expert on Cornish history. From 2006, for some years, he was more in evidence in Greater London, usually in his then office at Goldsmiths.

Where his output used to refer to Cornish landscapes, he later concentrated on aspects of Scilly as he assembled his long sequences "Elidius on Scilly" and "Landscapes".

He was found dead by John Levack Drever at his home, surrounded by documents and papers, on 16 February 2020.

== Published works ==
- wrack—Quarter After Press, USA, 2012 (e-book & printed)
- Memory Fictions—Argotist Ebooks, UK, 2012 (e-book)
- Unframed pictures, Writers Forum, UK, 2011
- Pictures, Cartoon Strips, Sound & Language, USA 2010
- Water lines and other poems, Chalk Editions, USA, 2009 (e-book)
- snapshots and video, Writers Forum, 2009
- a song and a film, Veer Publications, 2009
- Scat Songs on a text by Chris Funkhouser, Xexoxial Editions, USA, 2008
- QEV, Writers Forum 2005
- Wire Sculptures, Reality Street Editions 2003
- Three Rivers, housepress, 2003
- R & K Visual World Poetry, St Petersburg 2003
- Dandelion Collaboration (with Bob Cobbing), housepress, 2002
- Auditory Experiments, housepress, Canada, October 2001
- initial dance, Writers Forum, 2001 (OCLC 54322675)
- initial dance, housepress, Canada (ISBN 1894174364)
- initial dance, Visual World Poetry, St Petersburg, Russia, 2003
- Duets (with Bob Cobbing), Writers Forum, 2001
- Mutate/Cantate (with Bob Cobbing), Writers Forum, 2001
- Oi! (with Bob Cobbing), Writers Forum 2001
- Domestic Ambient Noise (with Bob Cobbing), Writers Forum, 1994–2000 (in 300 separate booklets)
- Meadows, Writers Forum, September 2000 (ISBN 086162999X)
- Curve (with Jennifer Pike & Bob Cobbing), Writers Forum, 2000 (ISBN 1842540114)
- Game on a line, 1st edition: PaperBrain Press, USA, 2000
- Sta!, housepress, Canada, 1999
- House, housepress, Canada 1999
- Easy Kill, Writers Forum, 1998
- Letters to Eric Mottram, Form Books, 1997
- Triptych, Writers Forum, 1997
- Fuming (with Bob Cobbing), Writers Forum, 1997
- Collaborations for Peter Finch (with Bob Cobbing), Writers Forum, 1997 (ISBN 0861627849)
- Mild homage to Terry Gilliam, Call this poetry, 1996
- Large painting from Written Graphical, Call this poetry, 1996
- Messages to silence, Writers Forum, 1995
- Icarus - his first assent, Spanner, Hereford, 1995
- DAM DIPTYCH, Writers Forum, 1995
- Waves on Porthmeor Beach (with Alaric Sumner), words worth books, 1995
- Domestic Ambient Noise ## 1-300 (with Bob Cobbing), Writers Forum, 1994-2000
- 4 Outputs, Pointing Device, 1991
- End of an imaginary flipbook, Pointing Device, 1991
- Incidents in the life of Apollo Pointing Device, 1990
- Creation capers, Pointing Device, 1989
- PARTI-collages, ILP, 1988
- Cartoon carnival, ILP, 1988
- The shopping family, ILP, 1987
- Approximate Capacities (with Lilian Ward), 1982
- Vivacity, 1982
- Loops, Writers Forum, 1979
- Views of Lyonnesse, Books 2 & 3, Writers Forum 1978
- Morning Humming, Lobby Press 1978
- The highways are seawater, Shabby Books, 1977
- Views of Lyonnesse, Book 1, Writers Forum, 1977
- Mutation Zimmer, Zimmer Press, 1977
- Karben fleem is not often, GEP, 1976
- Riming couples in series gep, 1975

== See also ==
- Benedict Taylor (musician)
