= Writers Forum =

Publisher, workshop and writers' network

Writers Forum is a small publisher, workshop and writers' network established by Bob Cobbing. The roots of Writers Forum were in the 1954 arts organisation Group H, and the And magazine that Cobbing edited. The writers' branch of Group H was called Writers Forum. In 1963 a press with the publishing imprint "Writers Forum" was begun and administered by Cobbing, John Rowan and Jeff Nuttall. Between 1963 and 2002 Writers' Forum published more than one thousand pamphlets and books including works by John Cage, Allen Ginsberg, Brion Gysin, and P. J. O'Rourke, as well as a wide range of British Poetry Revival modernist poets, such as Eric Mottram, Bill Griffiths, Geraldine Monk, Maggie O'Sullivan, Paula Claire and Sean Bonney. While publishing was integral to the Cobbing-led workshop, it also provided an opportunity for poets to read their works in a supportive and non-critical environment.

After Cobbing's death Writers Forum was directed by Lawrence Upton and Adrian Clarke until July 2010, when Clarke resigned. Since early July 2010, Writers Forum has been directed by Lawrence Upton (until his death in 2020) with assistance from others. Tina Bass was appointed Assistant Director in December 2010. Writers Forum continues to hold workshops and to publish. The magazine And ceased in 2010; but Pocket Litter was started in 2011.

A break-off "Writers Forum (second series)" workshop was founded in 2010, which, though having similarities in stated aims, is not supported by Writers Forum. The Forum's last publication before the split was SJ Fowler's Poggel Intricate. Organisations with similar names in Chile and Australia are recognised.
