= Sean Bonney =

English poet (1969–2019)

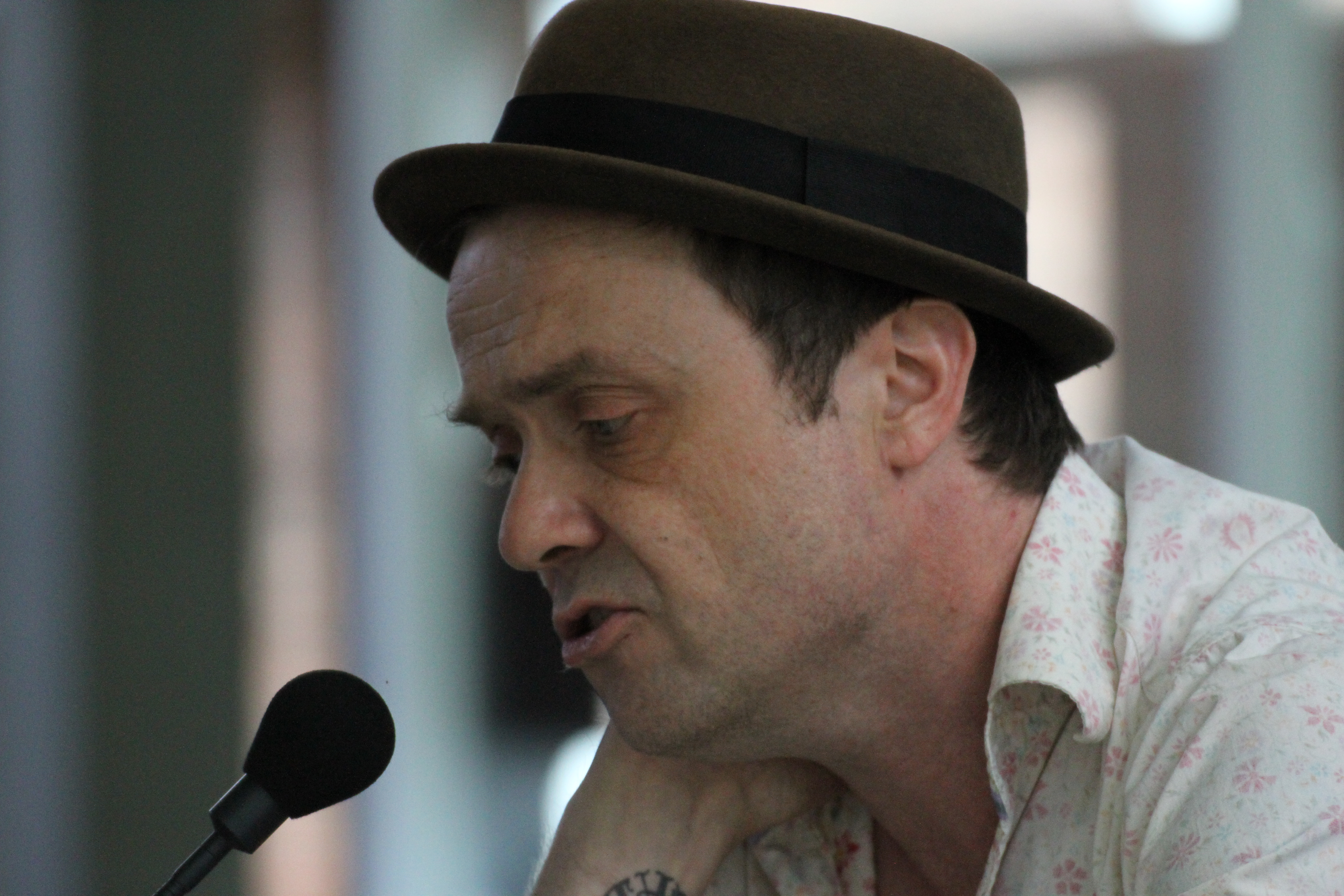

Sean Noel Bonney (21 May 1969 – 13 November 2019) was an English poet born in Brighton and brought up in the north of England. He lived in London and, from 2015 up until the time of his death, in Berlin. He was married to the poet Frances Kruk. Charles Bernstein published poet William Rowe's obituary for Bonney in US online magazine Jacket2, as well as releasing his own poem "The Death of Sean Bonney." Detailed notes to Bonney's poetics by Jacob Bard-Rosenberg are featured on the Poetry Foundation website. The Journal of British and Irish Innovative Poetry has published a special edition on Bonney.

His publications include Blade Pitch Control Unit (2005), Baudelaire in English (2008), Document (2009), The Commons (2011), Happiness: Poems After Rimbaud (2011), Letters Against the Firmament (2015), and Our Death (2019).

== Life and work ==
Together with other UK-based poets, Bonney's work marks a progression and continuance of the British Poetry Revival, combining with his abiding interest in left-wing radical movements such as British punk, the Angry Brigade, the Red Army Faction, the American Black Power movement, Surrealism and revolutionary art in general. He was an anti-fascist activist and revolutionary socialist who joined the 2011 London riots. Living at various points in Hackney, Hastings and Walthamstow, he was a regular attendee at the Bob Cobbing-led Writers Forum workshop, co-founding the reading series Xing the Line with Jeff Hilson, and co-editing the press Yt Communication with Frances Kruk. A sequence of 14 line poems, The Commons, originally subtitled "A Narrative / Diagram of the Class Struggle' combined contemporary uprisings with the voices of the Paris Commune, the Russian Revolution, the English Civil War and "the cracked melodies of ancient folk songs".

Following the completion of his PhD from Birkbeck, University of London, from 2015 to 2019 Bonney was a postdoctoral researcher at the John F. Kennedy Institute for North American Studies at the Free University of Berlin, conducting a project examining the work of Diane di Prima.

Bonney died on 13 November 2019 in Berlin.

== Books ==
- London Review Bookshop Samplers, No. 2, Face Press, 2019.
- Our Death, Commune Editions, 2019.
- Ghosts, Materials, 2017.
- Cancer: Poems After Katerina Gogou, A Firm Nigh Holistic Press, 2016.
- All This Burning Earth: Selected Writing, Ill Will Editions (online), 2016.
- Letters Against the Firmament, Enitharmon Press, 2015
- Letters: on Harmony, Iodine Press, 2013
- Four Letters, Four Comments, Punch Press, 2012
- Happiness (Poems After Rimbaud), Unkant Publishing, 2011
- The Commons, Openned, 2011
- For the Administration, Crater Press, 2010
- 5 After Rimbaud, Grasp Press, 2010
- Document: Poems, Diagrams, Manifestos: July 7th 2005 - June 27th 2007, Barque Press, 2008
- Baudelaire in English, Veer Books, 2007
- 'from Tracts and Commentaries: A Lecture' (in Pilot: A Journal of Contemporary Poetry, 2007)
- Black Water, Yt Communication, October 2006
- Document: hexprogress, Yt Communication, May 2006
- Blade Pitch Control Unit, Salt Publishing, 2005
- Poisons, Their Antidotes, West House Books, 2003
- Notes on Heresy, Writers Forum, 2002
- The Domestic Poem, Canary Woof, 2001
- From the Book of Living or Dying, Writers Forum, 1999.
- Astrophil and Stella, Writers Forum, 1999.
- now that all the popstars are dead, damnation publications, 1996
- Marijuana in the breadbin, Doktor Hypno publications, 1992

== See also ==
- British Poetry Revival
- Katerina Gogou
- Amiri Baraka
