= Modernist poetry =

Poetry written in Modernist tradition

Modernist poetry refers to poetry written between 1890 and 1950 in the tradition of modernist literature, but the dates of the term depend upon a number of factors, including the nation of origin, the particular school in quest of the critic setting the dates. The critic/poet C. H. Sisson observed in his essay Poetry and Sincerity that "Modernity has been going on for a long time. Not within living memory has there ever been a day when young writers were not coming up, in a threat of iconoclasm."

== Background ==
Though usually considered to have begun with the French Symbolist movement and ended with the Second World War, the exact start and end of the Modernist period are arbitrary. Modernist poetry is primarily characterized by its break from tradition, drawing from the rapid urbanization and secularization of the early 20th century. Poets like W. B. Yeats (1865–1939) and Rainer Maria Rilke (1875–1926) started in a post-Romantic, Symbolist vein and modernized their poetic idiom after being affected by political and literary developments.

== Schools ==
Acmeist poetry was a Russian modernist poetic school, which emerged c. 1911 and to symbols preferred direct expression through exact images. Figures involved with Acmeism include Nikolay Gumilev, Osip Mandelstam, Mikhail Kuzmin, Anna Akhmatova, and Georgiy Ivanov.

The Imagism, Anglo-American school from 1914 proved radical and important, marking a new point of departure for poetry. Some consider that it began in the works of H.D., Hardy and Pound, Eliot and Yeats, Williams and Stevens.

Around World War II, a new generation of poets sought to revoke the effort of their predecessors towards impersonality and objectivity. Thus, Objectivism was a loose-knit group of second-generation modernists from the 1930s. They include Louis Zukofsky, Lorine Niedecker, Charles Reznikoff, George Oppen, Carl Rakosi, and Basil Bunting. Objectivists treated the poem as an object; they emphasised sincerity, intelligence, and the clarity of the poet's vision. In the English-language modernism ends with the turn towards confessional poetry in the work of Robert Lowell and Sylvia Plath, among others. Poets, like Robert Frost, Wallace Stevens, and E. E. Cummings also went on to produce work after World War II.

The British Poetry Revival was a loose wide-reaching collection of groupings and subgroupings during the late 1960s and early 1970s. It was a modernist reaction to the conservative The Movement influenced by Basil Bunting and others. The leading poets included J. H. Prynne, Eric Mottram, Tom Raworth, Denise Riley, and Lee Harwood.

== Nature of modernism ==
Modernism emerged with its insistent breaks with the immediate past, its different inventions, 'making it new' with elements from cultures remote in time and space. The questions of impersonality and objectivity seem to be crucial to Modernist poetry. Modernism developed out of a tradition of lyrical expression, emphasising the personal imagination, culture, emotions, and memories of the poet. For the modernists, it was essential to move away from the merely personal towards an intellectual statement that poetry could make about the world. Even when they reverted to the personal, like T. S. Eliot in the Four Quartets and Ezra Pound in The Cantos, they distilled the personal into a poetic texture that claimed universal human significance. Herbert Read said of it, "The modern poet has no essential alliance with regular schemes of any sorts. They reserve the right to adapt their rhythm to their mood, to modulate their metre as they progress. Far from seeking freedom and irresponsibility (implied by the unfortunate term free verse) they seek a stricter discipline of exact concord of thought and feeling."

== See also ==
- Modernism
  - Modernist poetry in English
  - List of modernist poets
  - Modernismo
- Dada
- Futurism
- Expressionism
- Vers libre
- Symbolism (arts)
- The Blue Rider
- Oulipo

== Sources ==
- Cuddon, J. A. (1998). C.E. Preston (ed.). A Dictionary of Literary Terms and Literary Theory (4th rev. ed.). Oxford: Blackwell. ISBN 0-631-20271-4.
- Greene, Roland; et al., eds. (2012). The Princeton Encyclopedia of Poetry and Poetics (4th rev. ed.). Princeton, NJ: Princeton University Press. ISBN 978-0-691-15491-6.
- Schmidt, Michael, ed. (2012). The Great Modern Poets. Quercus Poetry. ISBN 9780857382467.
