= Tom Rawling =

Tom Rawling (1916–1996) was a teacher, angler and late-developing poet who wrote what Peter Porter called some of the "most unforced collections of nature poems for some years". His favoured subject was the Ennerdale valley in the English Lake District where he grew up in the early twentieth century.

Rawling was born in 1916 in Ennerdale, then called Cumberland, now Cumbria. Educated at the village school and then Whitehaven Grammar School, he studied history at University College, London. He spent the Second World War in the Royal Artillery and then returned to teaching. For the next thirty years, he taught in primary, secondary and special schools, returning to Cumbria every year, fly-fishing for sea-trout, often with the late Hugh Falkus. Retiring in 1976, he began to write poetry, joining the group that had formed around Anne Stevenson in Oxford during the mid-1970s.

With Stevenson's encouragement, his first poems were published under the title A Sort of Killing, in the Old Fire Station Poets series, an early venture by Neil Astley who went on to found the important Bloodaxe Books poetry press, based in Newcastle. A full collection, Ghosts At My Back, was published by Oxford University Press in 1982.

However, to Rawling's disappointment, OUP did not consider his work commercial enough for a second book. Later poems were published by smaller presses: The Old Showfield in 1984 and The Names of the Sea-Trout in 1993.

From 1979, Rawling took over the workshop established by Stevenson at the Old Fire Station Arts Centre, George Street, Oxford. Poets associated with this group included Anne Born, Pauline Stainer, Peter Forbes, Helen Kidd, W.N. Herbert, Elizabeth Garrett, Martyn Crucefix and Keith Jebb.

Rawling's poem 'Privy' was shortlisted in the Arvon/Observer International Poetry Competition in 1985.

A new selection of poems and prose pieces was published under the title How Hall: Poems and Memories - a passion for Ennerdale. There was an accompanying CD of Rawling reading the poems, recorded in 1983.
