= Clere Parsons =

India-born English poet

Clere Parsons (1908–1931) was an English poet, born in India. He was educated at Christ Church, University of Oxford, and edited the 1928 edition of Oxford Poetry.

His only collection, Poems, was published after his death by Faber & Faber. Both the Oxford University Press Anthology of Twentieth-Century British and Irish Poetry, and Penguin Books Poetry of the Thirties include selections from his work. Richard Burton in his 2013 biography of Basil Bunting, A Strong Song Tows Us, states that "given the evidence of the Poems, (Parsons) would have been a significant voice in twentieth century poetry".

His work was influenced by that of W. H. Auden and Laura Riding, and has been praised by Geoffrey Grigson and C. H. Sisson .

Parsons had Type I diabetes, and died of pneumonia.
