= Maggie O'Sullivan =

British poet, performer and visual artist (born 1951)

- Born: 1951 (age 74–75); Lincoln, England
- Occupations: Poet, performer and visual artist
- Writing career
- Movement: British Poetry Revival

Maggie O'Sullivan (born 1951) is a British poet, performer and visual artist associated with the British Poetry Revival.

== Life ==
O'Sullivan was born in Lincoln, England, of Irish immigrant parents. She moved to London in 1971 and worked for the BBC until 1988. Her early work appeared in magazines such as Angel Exhaust. She lives in Hebden Bridge, West Yorkshire.

O'Sullivan's work is influenced by Kurt Schwitters, Joseph Beuys, Jerome Rothenberg, Bob Cobbing and Basil Bunting. Her books include An Incomplete Natural History (1984), In the House of the Shaman (1993), Red Shifts (2000) and Palace of Reptiles (2003). She edited out of everywhere: An anthology of contemporary linguistically innovative poetry by women in North America & the UK (1996).
