= Jeff Hilson =

British poet (born 1966)

Jeff Hilson (born 1966) is a British poet. His works include A Grasses Primer (Form Books, 2000), Stretchers (Reality Street, 2006), Bird Bird (Landfill, 2009), and In The Assarts (Veer Books, 2010). He also edited The Reality Street Book of Sonnets, published in 2008. With Sean Bonney and David Miller he co-founded Crossing the Line, a reading series based in London.

Hilson is the son of British diplomat Malcolm Hilson OBE, and brother of the environmental lawyer Professor Christopher Hilson of the University of Reading. He was educated at Bedford School, where he was a boarder. He went to Girton College, Cambridge in 1985 to read English literature. He graduated in 1988 with a second class degree. He plays cricket for the Energy Exiles Cricket Club.

== See also ==
- British Poetry Revival
