= Frances Kruk =

Polish-Canadian poet

Frances Kruk is a contemporary Polish-Canadian poet living in London, UK. She completed her PhD at Royal Holloway, University of London, under the supervision of Redell Olsen. Her writings have been published in journals including Damn the Caesars, Sous les Pavés, onedit, fhole, ditch, and HOW2. She has exhibited visual work and performed solo and collaborative poetry, music, and interdisciplinary projects in various parts of Canada, USA, Cyprus, Ireland, and the UK.

She also edited the occasional micropress publication Yt Communication with her late husband, the poet Sean Bonney.

== Works ==
- Shift & Switch: New Canadian Poetry (Mercury Press, 2005)
- Markmallan (No. Press, 2005)
- clobber (yt communication, 2006)
- dig oubliette (yt communication, 2006)
- How2 Quick Flip (with Maggie O’Sullivan) (2007)
- A Discourse on Vegetation & Motion (Critical Documents, 2008)
- Infinite Difference: Other Poetries by UK Women Poets (Shearsman, 2010)
- Down you go, or, Négation de bruit (Punch Press, 2011)
- Thirst (2012)
- DWARF SURGE (yt communication, 2013)
- PIN (yt communication, 2014)
- lo-fi frags in progress (Veer, 2015)
- Kruk Book: An Anthology for Frances Kruk (with Sascha Akhtar, Tom Allen and Tom Betteridge) (2022)

== Selected performances ==
- Tar Disaster Project - Planetarium One (Calgary, 2002)
- Tar Disaster Project - Jazz Festival Calgary (Calgary, 2003)
- High Performance Rodeo/Mutton Busting (Calgary, 2004)
- Crossing the Line (London, 2006–2009)
- Opened (London, 2006–2008)
- Calgary International Spoken Word Festival (Calgary, 2005)
- TEST (Toronto, 2007)
- The Program (Providence, Rhode Island, 2007)
- Just Buffalo (Buffalo, New York, 2007)
- PerformingIdentity/Crossing Borders (Nicosia, 2007)
- SoundEye Festival (Cork, 2008–2009)
- textmusictext (London, 2009)
- The Other Room (Manchester, 2009)
- Greenwich Cross-Genre Festival (London, 2010)
- Cambridge Reading Series (Cambridge, 2010)

== Exhibitions ==
- Selected paintings - The Stephen Lawrence Gallery (London, 2010)
- Thought Process - photo and text installation at The Little Gallery, with photographer Anna Mandelkau (Calgary, 2004)
- a day in the life of particle girl coming to terms with her anger at the rules of gravity - mixed media art/performance installation, The Little Gallery (Calgary, 2004)

== Short films ==
The Balance (with Joshua Whitford) (2013)
