= Bomb Culture =

1968 book by Jeff Nuttall

- Author: Jeff Nuttall
- Language: English
- Genre: Non-fiction
- Publication date: 1968

Bomb Culture is a book by Jeff Nuttall about the counter-culture in London, which was first published in 1968.

== Summary ==
It reflected the influence of the threat of nuclear war, while describing the importance of pop music like the Beatles and countercultural figures like the Beat Generation. Nuttall believed in the liberatory power of imagination and "affect", which he hoped could bring about social change.

== Publication history ==
A new, expanded edition was published by Strange Attractor Press in December 2018. It features a new foreword by Iain Sinclair, a new afterword by Maria Fusco and an introduction by the editors, Jay Jeff Jones and Douglas Field, which includes archival images.

== Reception and legacy ==
Kirkus Reviews called Nuttall "a powerhouse communicator or overcommunicator with all the sprawling intellectual continuity and splashy effects that is implied", and suggested that the book was primarily aimed at Nuttall's own generation.

The Guardian in 2004 said it "remains a primary source and manifesto for the post-Hiroshima generation".
