= Paula Claire =

British Poet-Artist

Paula Claire (born 1939, Northampton, England) is a British Poet-Artist, whose work spans the areas of sound, visual, concrete and performance poetry. She was associated with the British Poetry Revival Movement in the 1970s and a member of Konkrete Canticle, a poetry collective founded by Bob Cobbing, which performed works for multiple voices and instruments. She has performed and exhibited her poetry internationally since 1969, creating site-specific performance pieces and using the voice contributions of her audience. She is founder and curator of the Paula Claire Archive: fromWORDtoART - International Poet-Artists, a collected body of work by fellow poet-artists.

== Early life ==
Paula Claire was brought up in Northamptonshire and educated at Notre Dame High School. She took part in the annual choral speaking and singing at the local Eisteddfod, so when at University College London, reading English Language/Literature (graduated 1960) she automatically joined the University choir. Giving a carol concert under the dome of St Paul's Cathedral was a hugely influential experience. The sound of words uttered by many voices melded with music; the appearance of language as an expression of art; these twin aspects became the foundations of her work begun 4 May 1961.

She decided to use her first two names as her nom de plume in honour of John Clare the Northamptonshire poet because she played in Northampton grounds and spinneys he frequented in the last 20 years of his life.

In 1964 she went with a college friend to Athens and began teaching English as a foreign language with the endorsement of the British Council. Travelling to many Greek islands (in particular Crete), Turkey, Lebanon, Jordan, Egypt and Italy broadened her horizons. In 1966, immersed in the poetry of her chief influence, Gerard Manley Hopkins, she developed her non-linear 'mobile poems' that invited 'all present' to vocal participation.

== Writing and Performing ==
Returning to live and teach in Oxford, she published her first booklet 'Mobile Poems Greece' (1968), giving her first performance from this in 1969. A big step forward was meeting key figure in the British Poetry Revival Bob Cobbing (1920-2002) at a Poetry Society Conference. He invited her to present work with him, in particular at the seminal ?concrete poetry exhibition, Stedelijk Museum Amsterdam 1970; the ICA launch of Kroklok with Dom Sylvester Houedard 1971; subsequently founded Konkrete Canticle for them to record a vinyl LP for when the show toured GB. She worked in Konkrete Canticle up to 1993, giving major performances, in particular Southwark Cathedral in aid of the Globe Theatre (1972); Berlin Festival (1977), International Sound Poetry Festivals in Toronto (1978) and New York (1980); Festivals in London, Cambridge and Germany. She recreated some of the performances as a tribute to Bob Cobbing, recorded at Raven Row Gallery, London (May 2015).

In the 1980s she was invited to several short Residencies at Texas Tech University Electronic Music Studio with Steven Paxton: they produced her first CD The Dundee Telegrams And Other Communications (1990). Her poetry and music duo Resoundscore with composer/musician Peter Stacey produced various cassettes and the CD The Clue (2010).

Paula Claire had a long, creative relationship with eminent poet and art critic in Rome, Mirella Bentivoglio (1922-2017), who pioneered the recognition of international female exponents of sound and visual poetry with many group exhibitions in Italy, the most important Materializzazione del Linguaggio, Venice Biennale 1978. Here Claire pioneered performance in the environment creating Codestones of Venice (Writers Forum 1978), her treated text of John Ruskin's Stones of Venice (1851) she presented in English and Italian outside the Old Salt Store overlooking the Zattere in the sunset with the voices of fellow poets, students, Venetians and tourists. Since then she has created site-specific performance pieces for fields, gardens, orchards; and major buildings, in particular exploring with many voices the acoustics of Exeter, Ely and Oxford cathedrals.

The concrete aspect of her work manifests in the use of actual objects in performance, especially natural objects. She began in 1973 at the Poetry Society, vocal improvisations to the markings and text/ures of various stones (Stone Tones, Writers Forum 1974), perceiving these patterns as triggers for utterance evolved, she believes, from ancestral memory, her 'gestation of language' research. Working with leaves led to designs for large-scale plantings of 'living monuments' based on her favourite tree, the ginkgo. In performance with created objects she often uses found material, but in particular works with glass panels and objects made in collaboration with her husband stained glass artist Paul San Casciani. Many of her projects she documents with both unique and limited edition artist's books: 128 created by March 2020. These she illustrates with her digitally enhanced photos, computer graphics and iPad 'scrawls.'

In 2010 Paula Claire put herself forward as a candidate for the position of Oxford Professor of Poetry, but withdrew claiming she was disadvantaged by sexism.

In June 2019 Paula Claire celebrated her 80th year by publishing a book, 8 Poems for 80, and with the performance of a mixed programme for the British Library From Word to Art with PoetArtist Paula Claire, which was filmed for their Performance Archive.

Codestones of Venice Revisited was a talk and interactive performance given by Paula in January 2020, reviving in new format the outdoor performance poem based on her earlier work Codestones of Venice which was created for Materializzazione del Linguaggio exhibition, Venice Biennale 1978. This showcased innovative work by 80 female practitioners working between word and art. The 2nd issue of Tinted Window magazine contains detailed articles about the major significance of this exhibition including an interview with Paula Claire and historic photographs of her from the Venice Biennale Archive.

In March 2020 Paula Claire's Little Press published fromWORDtoART - browsing the Paula Claire Archive - International PoetArtists. She gave a short interactive performance from her attic Archive window following social distancing requirements, pending a more official event when lockdown is lifted.

At the Society of Authors' Awards in 2021, Paula was the recipient of a Cholmondeley Award for her body of work and contribution to poetry.

== The Paula Claire Archive ==
In 1978 she founded an international archive of sound and visual poetry, the Paula Claire Archive; fromWORDtoART - International PoetArtists. Originally named The International Concrete Poetry Archive, it was officially opened by Mirella Bentivoglio in 1980, and contains over 6,500 books, poem objects, anthologies, magazines, exhibition catalogues, sound poetry records, cassettes, CDs, correspondence and much documentation. It was gathered by exchanging her Little Press publications with fellow international poets, and is the basis of illustrated talks and displays.

== Works (selected list) ==
Online catalogue at the Poetry Library Southbank Centre www.poetrylibrary.org.uk

- Mobile Poems, Greece (P. Claire, 1968)
- SOUNDSWORD (Little Press Writers Forum, 1972)
- Catalogue One: DECLARATIONS Poems 1961-91. Introduction by Professor Eric Mottram 1991
- Catalogue Two: DI-VERS-ITY - Extending Forms of Poetry, Poems 1991-2001 (nos. 383-588) published at her 40th Anniversary Reading
- Catalogue Three: GOING FOR GOLD Part Two: Poems 2001-2011 (nos. 589-795) Introduction by Professor Robert Hampson, published at her 50th Anniversary Reading
- Autobiography: GOING FOR GOLD Part One: My Life in Poetry: 50 Years Sustained Introduction by Mirella Bentivoglio
- SEE JIG SAW, an essay in/on concrete poetry, Oxford 2009.
- WORDSWORKWONDERS, an anthology of 25 selected poems 1961-2010 to celebrate 40 years of performance.
- The Salt Companion to Bill Griffiths, edited by Will Rowe (Salt Publications, 2007) a chapter about Konkrete Canticle
- CLASP: Post Modernist Poetry in London in the 1970's, edited by Ken Edwards and Robert Hampson (Shearsman, 2016), chapter entitled Working with Bob Cobbing in the 1970s.

== About Paula Claire ==
- The New Concrete: Visual Poetry in the 21st Century, Edited by Victoria Bean and Chris MacCabe, Hayward Gallery Publishing 2015.
- Towards Design in Poetry (p26-28) Professor Eric Mottram, Writers Forum London (1977)
- Performing the World (p189-96) Julian Cowley, from In Black and Gold: Continuous Trends in Post-War British and Irish Poetry, Rodolpi Australia-Atlanta (1994)
- Touch Monkeys: Nonsense Strategies for reading Twentieth-century Poetry (p161) Marnie Parsons, University of Toronto Press, Canada (1994)
- Feminism's experimental 'work at the language face' Laura A Kinnahan, from The Cambridge Companion to Twentieth-century British and Irish Women's Poetry (p166-7) Editor Jane Dowson, University of Cambridge Press (2011)
- Social Biography of Contemporary Innovative Poetry Communities (p165) Elizabeth-Jane Burnett Palgrave Macmillan Switzerland (2017)
- Paula Claire in conversation with William Cobbing Tinted Window Issue No.2 - Materializzazione del Linguaggio (p. 23-37) Antenne Books (2019)
