= Redimiculum Matellarum =

First collection of poetry

Redimiculum Matellarum (the title means 'A necklace of chamberpots') was the first collection of poetry published by Basil Bunting.

== Publication ==
The pamphlet collection, privately printed in Milan in 1930, included 13 poems written between 1925 and 1929. Priced at 'Half a Crown or Twelve Lire', it had been subsidized by Margaret de Silver, widow of a wealthy American businessman, whose help Bunting acknowledged in the preface:

These poems are byproducts of an interrupted and harassed apprenticeship. I thank Margaret De Silver for bailing me out of Fleet Street: after two years convalenscence from an attack of journalism I am beginning to recover my honesty. Rapallo, 1930

Bunting's poem 'Villon' was followed by two sections of shorter poems: 'Carmina' (containing 'Weeping oaks grieve', I am agog for foam', 'Against the tricks of time', 'After the grimaces of capitulation', 'Narciss, my numerous cancellations prefer' and 'Empty vast days') and 'Etcetera' (containing 'An arles, an arles for my hiring', 'Loud intolerant bells', 'Dear be still', 'Chorus of Furies (overheard)', 'Darling of Gods and Men' and 'As to my heart'.

== Reception ==
Though Redimiculum Matellarum went "virtually unnoticed", it did receive a review by Louis Zukofsky in Poetry. Ezra Pound also paid tribute to the collection in Canto LXXIV as "'Redimiculum Matellorum' / privately printed / to the shame of various critics".
