= Keith Jebb =

Keith Jebb is a contemporary English poet and critic. He attended St. Catherine's College, Oxford, and is the current Head Lecturer of Creative Writing at the University of Bedfordshire, Luton. He is also the author of A. E. Housman (Seren Press), a work commended by Harold Bloom in the introduction to his A. E. Housman.

== His works ==
- hide white space (Kater Murr's Press, 2006)
- tonnes (Kater Murr's Press, 2008)
