= Allen Fisher =

English painter (born 1944)

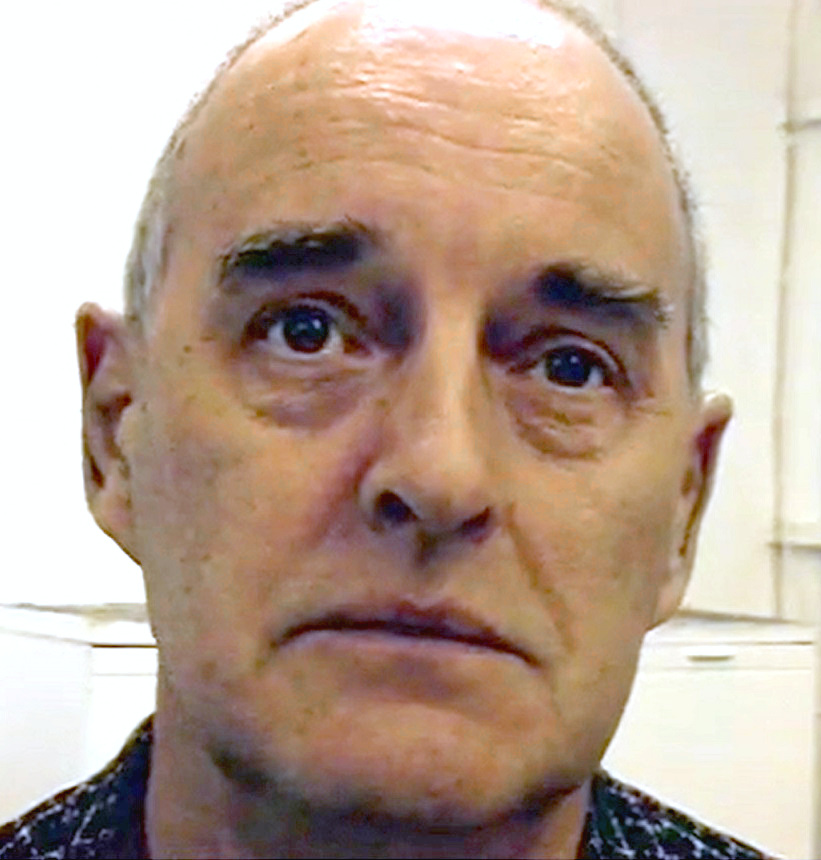
Allen Fisher in Speaking Portraits

Allen Fisher (born 1944) is a poet, painter, publisher, teacher and performer associated with the British Poetry Revival.

Fisher was born in London and started writing poetry in 1962. In the late 1960s, he was involved with Fluxshoe, the United Kingdom offshoot of Fluxus, and performance has remained an important part of his practice. He established himself as a poet through his early, decade-long, poetry project Place, which was published in a series of books and pamphlets during the 1970s. This project which drew, in part, on the Olson tradition of 'open field' projective verse poetics and, in part, on the procedural tradition of poets like Jackson Mac Low, was one of the major works of the British Poetry Revival, although it wasn't published as a single volume until 2005, when it was brought out by Ken Edwards's Reality Street. After the abandonment (as planned) of Place, he worked on a project called Gravity as a consequence of shape from 1982 which he completed in 2007. As with Place, this was published in a series of books and pamphlets throughout this period. The total work amounts to some 800 pages. This project was followed by a book of emblems (poem-image-commentary) called "Proposals" and, in 2014, a collage book of poetry, visual images and prose quotations called "SPUTTOR". In this work and others, the techniques of collage seen in his painting were also applied by Fisher to his poetic practice. Fisher’s books are also "deeply interested in issues involving empathy and scientific enquiry".

Fisher also made an important contribution to the British Poetry Revival as a publisher. As editor of Spanner and "New London Pride", he published many of the British Poetry Revival poets. He was also co-editor of Aloes Books. Fisher has also sustained a concurrent art practice. During the 1980s, he gained a BA from Goldsmiths' College, University of London, where he was taught by Harry Thubron and Elma Thubron. He gained an MA from Essex University in Art History. He has had a number of solo shows, including 'Dispossession and Cure' at the Mayor's Parlour Gallery in Hereford. His last retrospective painting show was in Hereford Museum & Art Gallery in 1993. He has over 150 publications in his name consisting of art documentation, poetry and theory. A book of essays "Imperfect Fit: Aesthetic Function, Facture and Perception" regarding American and British Poetry & Art Since 1950 and other essays on poetics was published by the University of Alabama in 2016. An edited collection of essays on his work from the start through to "SPUTTOR", "The Allen Fisher Companion", edited by Robert Hampson and cris cheek, was published by Shearsman in 2020. Forthcoming:an "Allen Fisher Reader".

Fisher is Emeritus Professor of Poetry and Art at Manchester Metropolitan University. He has exhibited widely and his work is represented in the Tate Gallery.

He edits the magazine Spanner.

== Select Bibliography 2004-2022 ==
- 'proceeds in the garden, after Dante’s Paradiso, artist’s book, Spanner Editions, 2022.
- 'Black Pond, compete 1-8, Spanner Editions, 2021.
- 'Piano Knots, Earthbound Press, 2021.
- 'Black Pond 7, Spanner Editions, 2020.
- 'No Longer Alone, a sequence of 28 poems with a set of photographs by Paige Mitchell, Spanner, 2019.
- 'Black Pond 7, a publication of the poetry with ten specific pictures, in an edition limited to 15 copies measuring 51 x 73 cm (20 x 29”), printed on an HP 10,000, Spanner, 2018.
- 'loggerheads, Spanner, Hereford, 2018.
- 'Ideas on the culture dreamed of, a reprint to be issued by The Literary Pocket Book, Pontypridd, 2016.
- 'Gravity as a consequence of shape, a volume bringing together the collected books from the 1982-2007 sequence, Hastings: Reality Street, 2016.
- 'PLACE, a volume bringing together the collected books from the 1970s’ sequence, Hastings: Reality Street, a new edition 2016.
- 'Fall air Sound, after the Three Choirs Festival, Apple Store Gallery, 2015
- 'TIP REGARD, poetry from the occasion of the Fifth Sussex Poetry Festival, Hereford: Spanner, 2014.
- 'SPUTTOR, poetry and images, collages and quotations, London: Veer Books, 2014.
- 'DEFAMILIARISING ____________ * a reprint of the 1982 book republished in facsimile format and with an added preface, London: Veer Books, 2013.
- 'drawn rooms, as a concertina book, Pontypridd: The Literary Pocket Book, 2013.
- 'The Marvels of Lambeth, Interviews and statements by Allen Fisher, 1973-2005, Exeter: Shearsman, 2013.
- 'PROPOSALS, 1-35, poem-image-commentary, Hereford: Spanner, 2010.
- 'Birds, poetry from Proposals, Old Hunstanton, Norfolk: Oystercatcher Press, 2009.
- 'LEANS, volume three from Gravity as a consequence of shape, Cambridge: Salt Publishing, 2007.
- 'Confidence in lack, four essays, Sutton: Writers Forum, 2007.
- 'Quietly Random, poetry, Manchester: Matchbox, 2007.
- 'singularity stereo, poetry from Gravity as a consequence of shape, London: Barque, 2006.
- 'Stroll and Strut Step, poetry from Gravity as a consequence of shape, with visual work, Hereford: Spanner, 2004.
- 'ENTANGLEMENT, volume two from Gravity as a consequence of shape, Willowdale, Ontario: The Gig, 2004.
- 'GRAVITY, volume one from Gravity as a consequence of shape, West Perth, Australia and Cambridge: Salt Publications, 2004.
