= Eric Mottram =

British teacher, critic, editor and poet (1924–1995)

- Born: 29 December 1924; London, England
- Died: 16 January 1995 (aged 70); London, England
- Education: Pembroke College, Cambridge
- Occupations: Teacher, critic, editor and poet
- Known for: British Poetry Revival

Eric Mottram (29 December 1924 – 16 January 1995) was a British teacher, critic, editor and poet who was one of the central figures in the British Poetry Revival.

== Early life and education ==
Mottram was born on 29 December 1924 in London and educated at Purley Grammar School, Croydon, and Blackpool Grammar School, Lancashire. In 1943, he was awarded a scholarship to Pembroke College, Cambridge, but opted to serve in the Royal Navy instead, only taking up the scholarship in 1947. He graduated with honours in 1950, obtaining a first in both parts of the English Literature, Life and Thought tripos (Double First). M.A. in 1951. Over the following decade, Mottram travelled extensively and worked as a lecturer at the University of Zurich, Switzerland (1951–52), University of Malaya in Singapore (1952–55), and as Professor at the University of Groningen, Netherlands (1955–60).

== King's College London ==
In 1960, Mottram returned to London and took a post as Lecturer in English and American Literature at King's College London. At the time, King's was one of very few British universities to offer American studies, and Mottram was to prove a pioneer in the field. He co-founded the Institute of United States Studies in 1963, the same year in which his tenure as a lecturer at King's was confirmed. In 1973, Mottram became Reader in English and American Literature and a special Chair was created for him as professor in 1982. In September 1990, he retired with the title Emeritus Professor of English and American Literature.

== Mottram and the Beat Generation ==
In the early 1960s, Mottram travelled to the United States and met a number of writers, including William Carlos Williams, Allen Ginsberg and others. He became friendly with William Burroughs during his time in London. These contacts resulted in three of Mottram's best-known critical books - William Burroughs: the algebra of need (1971, British edition 1977), Allen Ginsberg in the Sixties (1972) and Paul Bowles: staticity & terror (1976). These studies did much to help introduce the Beat Generation writers to a wider British audience.

== Mottram and Robert Duncan ==
Mottram corresponded with the American poet Robert Duncan between 1971 and 1986. The full correspondence was published as The Unruly Garden: Robert Duncan and Eric Mottram, Letters and Essays, edited and with an Introduction by Amy Evans and Shamoon Zamir (Peter Lang, 2007).

== Mottram as poet ==
Mottram's first book of poetry, Inside the Whale, was published by Bob Cobbing's Writers Forum in 1970. Mottram went on to publish at least another 34 collections, including A Book of Herne: 1975–1981, Elegies (both 1981) and Selected Poems (1989).

Carl Kears proposes Mottram as a key overlooked figure of 20th-century medievalism, suggesting that Mottram's A Book of Herne "developed forms of collage that brought the early medieval past into collision with new ways of thinking about poetic form".

His work clearly shows the influence of the American avant-garde poets he admired, particularly in his use of techniques such as found poetry, cut-up technique and collage, but it also has a distinctly British quality in the tradition of Basil Bunting.

An interview with Mottram appeared in the London-based magazine Angel Exhaust, along with his poetry.

An interview and poetry reading, recorded in 1982, appears in My KPFA.

== Mottram as editor ==
In 1971, Mottram was made editor of the Poetry Society's magazine Poetry Review. Over the next six years, he edited twenty issues that featured most, if not all, of the key poets associated with the British Poetry Revival and carried reviews of books and magazines from the wide range of small presses that had sprung up to publish them. Mottram also included work by a number of American poets, a fact that ultimately led to his removal from the post.

During this period, Mottram was twice a guest lecturer at Kent State University, where, along with Black Mountain poet Ed Dorn, he was an early supporter of the musical group Devo, and its founders Gerald Casale and Bob Lewis, whose poetry Mottram published when he was editor of Poetry Review. He also edited The Rexroth Reader (1972) and the section of the 1988 anthology The New British Poetry that was given over to the poets associated with the Revival.

== Death, archives and collections ==
Mottram died 16 January 1995 in London. His archive is now in the care of the King's College London Archives. Mottram's "protege" Bill Griffiths assisted with organising the collection and it is currently being completed by Valerie Soar. Carl Kears notes that within the archive the influence of medieval poetry, especially Old English poetry is apparent.

An article by Eric Mottram: "Notes on Poetics", Curriculum Vitae, Letter and three poems, and the complete Eric Mottram bibliography, are collated in a dossier edited by T. Wignesan, The Journal of Comparative Poetics, Vol. I, No. 1 (Paris), Spring 1989, pp. 37–63. Volume 1, Nos 2 & 3 of the same journal include a supplement to the Eric Mottram bibliography by Clive Bush.
