= Tom Raworth =

English-Irish poet

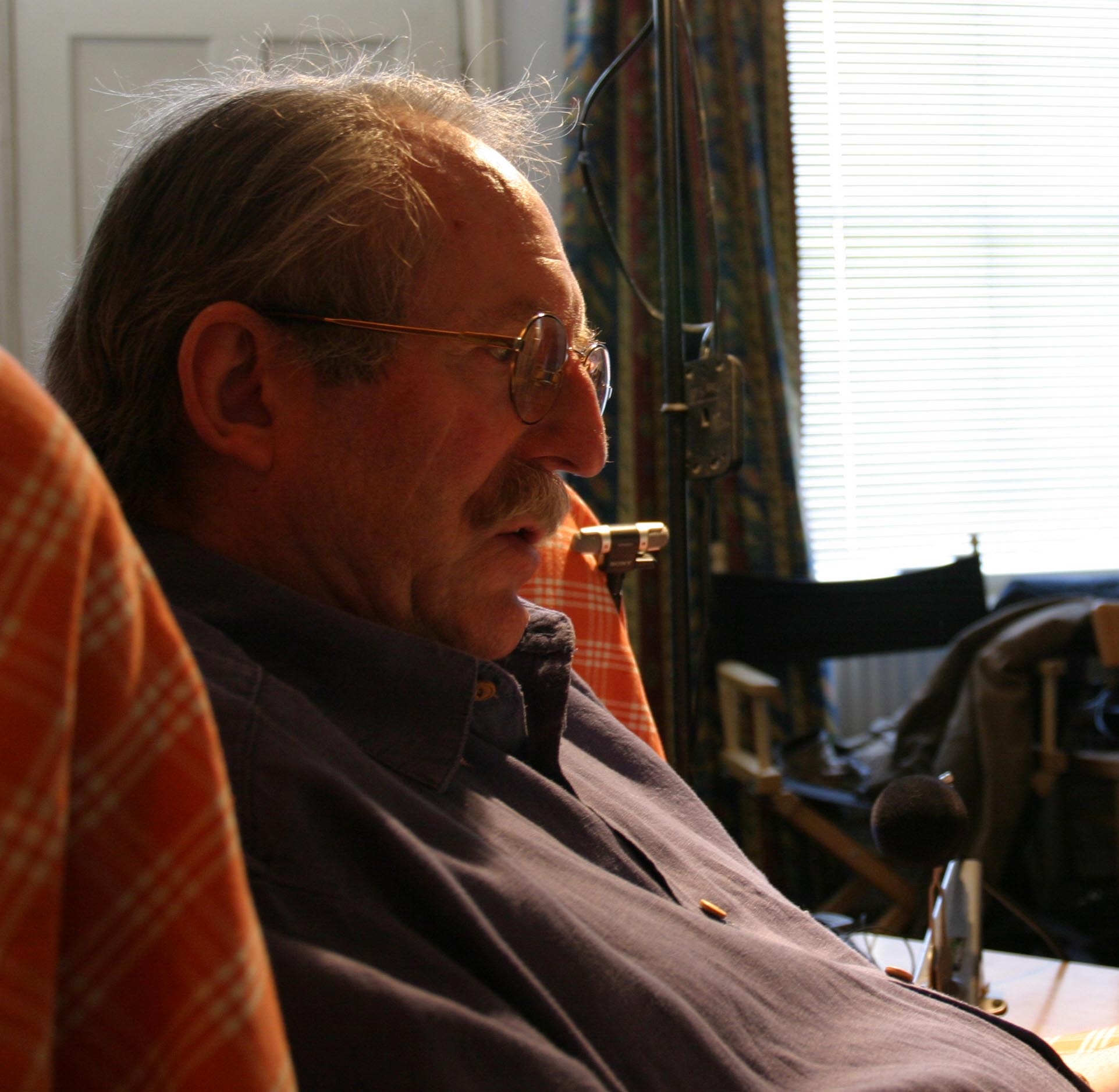
- Raworth in 2003 (photo by Gloria Graham)
- Born: Thomas Moore Raworth; 19 July 1938; Bexleyheath, Kent, England
- Died: 8 February 2017 (aged 78)
- Occupations: Poet, publisher, editor, teacher
- Writing career
- Language: English
- Genres: Poetry, essays, translation
- Literary movement: British Poetry Revival, Late-Modernism

Thomas Moore Raworth (19 July 1938 – 8 February 2017) was an English-Irish poet, publisher, editor, and teacher who published over 40 books of poetry and prose during his life. His work has been translated and published in many countries. Raworth was a key figure in the British Poetry Revival.

== Life and work ==
=== Early life ===
Raworth was born on 19 July 1938 in Bexleyheath, Kent, and grew up in Welling, the neighbouring town. His family maintained its strong Irish connections while he was growing up, something which would leave an impression on Raworth's sense of himself as a poet. His mother's family lived in the same house in Dublin as Seán O'Casey while the playwright was working on Juno and the Paycock. When he was 52 years old, Raworth acquired an Irish passport.

He was educated at St. Stephen's Primary School, Welling, Kent (1943–1949); St Joseph's Academy, Blackheath, London S.E.3. (1949–1954); and at the University of Essex (1967–1970), where he earned a Master's degree in 1970. He left school at sixteen and worked at a variety of jobs. According to Raworth:

Between leaving school in 1954 and going to the University of Essex in 1967 I had a variety of jobs, including insurance clerk, builders' labourer, packer, assistant transport manager, and continental telephonist. In 1959 I taught myself how to set type and to print, and between then and 1964 I produced three issues of a magazine (outburst) and a series of small books.

In the early 1960s, with the magazine Outburst, Raworth started his professional publishing career, when he published a number of British and American poets including Ed Dorn, Allen Ginsberg, and LeRoi Jones. He also founded Matrix Press at this time, publishing small books by Dorn, David Ball, Piero Heliczer, and others. In 1965, while working as an operator at the international telephone exchange, Raworth and Barry Hall set up Goliard Press, which published Charles Olson's first British collection. These publishing ventures contributed importantly to a new found British interest in the New American Poetry movement of the 1960s.

Raworth was considered "a particularly transatlantic writer, living in the US for several years in the seventies" and is considered to be part of the Pop Art movement; according to Ken Edwards, his poetry can be "punctuated by graphics" and in it there is a "transgression of the boundaries between the written word, the visual and the aural." Raworth's connection to American poetry as an editor and publisher, established his reputation in the U.S., considered unequalled by any other British poet of that time.

=== Poetry and publications ===
Raworth's first book, The Relation Ship (1966), won the Alice Hunt Bartlett Prize. Raworth attended the University of Essex from 1967–70, under the aegis of Donald Davie who ran its literature department. According to Raworth, he studied Spanish at the University of Essex, working toward a B.A. in Latin American Literature. But after the first year, he transferred to the Masters program and in 1970 was awarded an M.A. in the Theory and Practice of Literary Translation.

In the 1970s, he worked in the United States and Mexico, first teaching in universities in Ohio, Chicago and Texas, and later living in San Francisco where he was involved with the Zephyrus Image press. After six years abroad he returned with his family to England in 1977 to take up the post of resident poet in King's College, Cambridge for a year.

Raworth's early poetry was influenced by the Black Mountain and New York School poets, particularly Robert Creeley and John Ashbery, together with strands of European poetry (Apollinaire), Dada, and Surrealism. His 1974 book Ace showed that Raworth had moved to a more disjunctive style. This style was reflected in short, unpunctuated lines that lead the reader into following multiple syntactic possibilities, and where it is "increasingly impossible to keep track of the profusion of meanings on offer." Raworth's "poetic line" can knit together anything from observations of the everyday to self-reflexive commentary on the acts of thinking and writing, to lifts from pulp fiction and film noir, to political satire:

Those looking for a sustained, linear narrative or argument are to be disappointed, but the themes interlock and repeat with an uncanny frequency that nonetheless gives the poem a grim feeling of progress – in the sense that tracing a finger along the side of a Möbius strip is progress.

What followed was a series of long poems in this particular mode—after Ace came Writing (composed 1975–77; published 1982), Catacoustics (composed 1978–81; published 1991) and West Wind (composed 1982–83; published 1984). Subsequent projects extended this mode into a kaleidoscopic sequence of 14-line poems (not exactly "sonnets") that extended through "Sentenced to Death" (in Visible Shivers, 1987), Eternal Sections (1993) and Survival (1994). Later collections include Clean & Well Lit (1996), Meadow (1999), Caller and Other Pieces (2007), and Let Baby Fall (2008).

Raworth's 550-page Collected Poems was published in 2003. Although a number of major poems still remained uncollected at the time, much of this work was subsequently published: beginning with Windmills in Flames (2010). Whatever didn’t make it into the latter publication, found its way into Structures from Motion and As When, both published in 2015. A book of Raworth's prose, Earn your Milk, was published in 2009. The latter included all of his uncollected prose, including "uncategorizable prose-work", long out-of-print: A Serial Biography (1969), which has been described as an "assembly of memoir and reportage."

Several boxes of Raworth's notebooks, typescripts, and correspondence (ca. 1968–1977) are held at the University of Connecticut's Dodd Research Center.

=== Partial Bibliography ===
Poetry

- The Relation Ship. Goliard. 2nd ed., 1969: Cape Goliard.
- 1968: The Big Green Day. Trigram.
- 1970: Lion Lion. Trigram.
- 1971: Moving. Cape Goliard.
- 1973: Act. Trigram.
- 1974: Ace. Goliard. 2nd ed., 1977: The Figures. 3rd ed., 2001: Edge Books.
- 1976: Common Sense. Zephyrus Image.
- 1976: Logbook. Poltroon.
- 1976: The Mask. Poltroon.
- 1979: Nicht Wahr, Rosie?: Miscellaneous Poems 1964–1969. Poltroon.
- 1982: Writing. The Figures.
- 1984: Tottering State: Selected and New Poems 1963–1983. The Figures. 2nd ed., 1988: Paladin. 3rd ed., 2000: O Books.
- 1987: Visible Shivers. O Books/Trike.
- 1991: Catacoustics. Street Editions.
- 1993: Eternal Sections. Sun & Moon.
- 1996: Clean & Well Lit: Selected Poems 1987–1995. Roof Books.
- 1999: Meadow. Post-Apollo.
- 2003: Collected Poems. Carcanet.
- 2010: Windmills in Flames: Old & New Poems. Carcanet.
- 2014: XIVLiners. Sancho Panza.
- 2015: Structure from Motion. Edge Books.
- 2015: As When: A Selection. Carcanet.

Translations

- 1971: Selections from Argentina, Bolivia, Chile, and Peru in The Penguin Book of Latin American Verse. Penguin Books.
- 1986: Liliane Giraudon, What Day Is It. Women’s Studio Workshop.
- 1993: Dario Villa, Between the Eyelashes. Active in Airtime.
- 2017: Hans Arp and Vicente Huidobro, Save Your Eyes. Face Press (posthumous).

Prose

- 1967: A Serial Biography. Fulcrum. 2nd ed., 1977: Turtle Island.
- 1971: Betrayal. Trigram.
- 2009: Earn Your Milk: Collected Prose. Salt.
- 2025: Cancer. Carcanet (posthumous).

== Reception and influence ==
Over the years, since his work began appearing in the 1960s, Raworth had more than 40 books of his own work published, including pamphlets of poetry, prose and translations. Raworth gave regular readings of his work throughout his life, across Europe, the U.S., and beyond. In time, he even gave readings in China and Mexico. He made a number of recordings and videos during the course of his career. Raworth's readings had their own "signature style," which was specifically noted for the speed of his delivery, something David Kaufmann has described as "breakneck speed." Kaufmann writes that when Raworth "gives live readings, he runs roughshod over the line breaks, thus making it impossible for the reader to rest with what she has just heard."

Raworth was also interested in collaborative work. This was reflected in the many performance events and texts he created in collaboration with musicians such as Steve Lacy, Joëlle Léandre, Giancarlo Locatelli, Peter Brötzmann and Steve Nelson-Raney; other poets, including Jim Koller, Anselm Hollo, Gregory Corso, Dario Villa and Franco Beltrametti; and painters including Joe Brainard, Jim Dine, Giovanni D'Agostino and Micaëla Henich.

In 1991, he was the first European writer in 30 years to be invited to teach at the University of Cape Town.

In 2007, Raworth was awarded the Antonio Delfini prize for lifetime achievement, in Modena, Italy. Some of his other awards included the Cholmondeley Award, and the Philip Whalen Memorial Award.

His visual art consists mainly of drawings, collage and found object art and was exhibited in Italy, France, South Africa, and the United States.

As fellow poet Catherine Wagner has pointed out, Raworth was an "inventor of dozens of ingenious and provocative forms," and so was an important influence on a succession of poets that have followed him. At the time of his death, he was considered by many to be, arguably, the finest British poet of his generation.

== Death ==
Raworth was plagued by ill health for most of his life. In the 1950s, he was one of the first patients ever to survive open heart surgery. In the autumn of 2016, he began cancer treatments, but on 23 January 2017 he wrote the final entry on his blog:

Please suspend any donations. Last Friday after two days of tests, scans, bone-marrow extraction and so on, our Doctor came in the evening to say the cancer had badly metastsized [sic] ... to bone marrow, liver, right lung, kidney and small bowel. Nothing to be done except palliative care and that I had at most two weeks to live. So that's it. I can't see I shall ever get back here. Emails will reach Val who obviously will pass along to me whatever she can. Bits of it all have been fun and it's been a decent run.

Raworth died on 8 February 2017 at the age of 78. He was survived by his wife Val Raworth who said: "Tom died this afternoon, peacefully, his family around him. A release from his sufferings." Val died on May 29, 2023.

== See also ==
- Black Mountain poets
- British Poetry Revival
- Language Poetry
- New York School
- Children of Albion: Poetry of the Underground in Britain
