= Black Mountain poets =

Group of mid-20th-century American postmodern poets

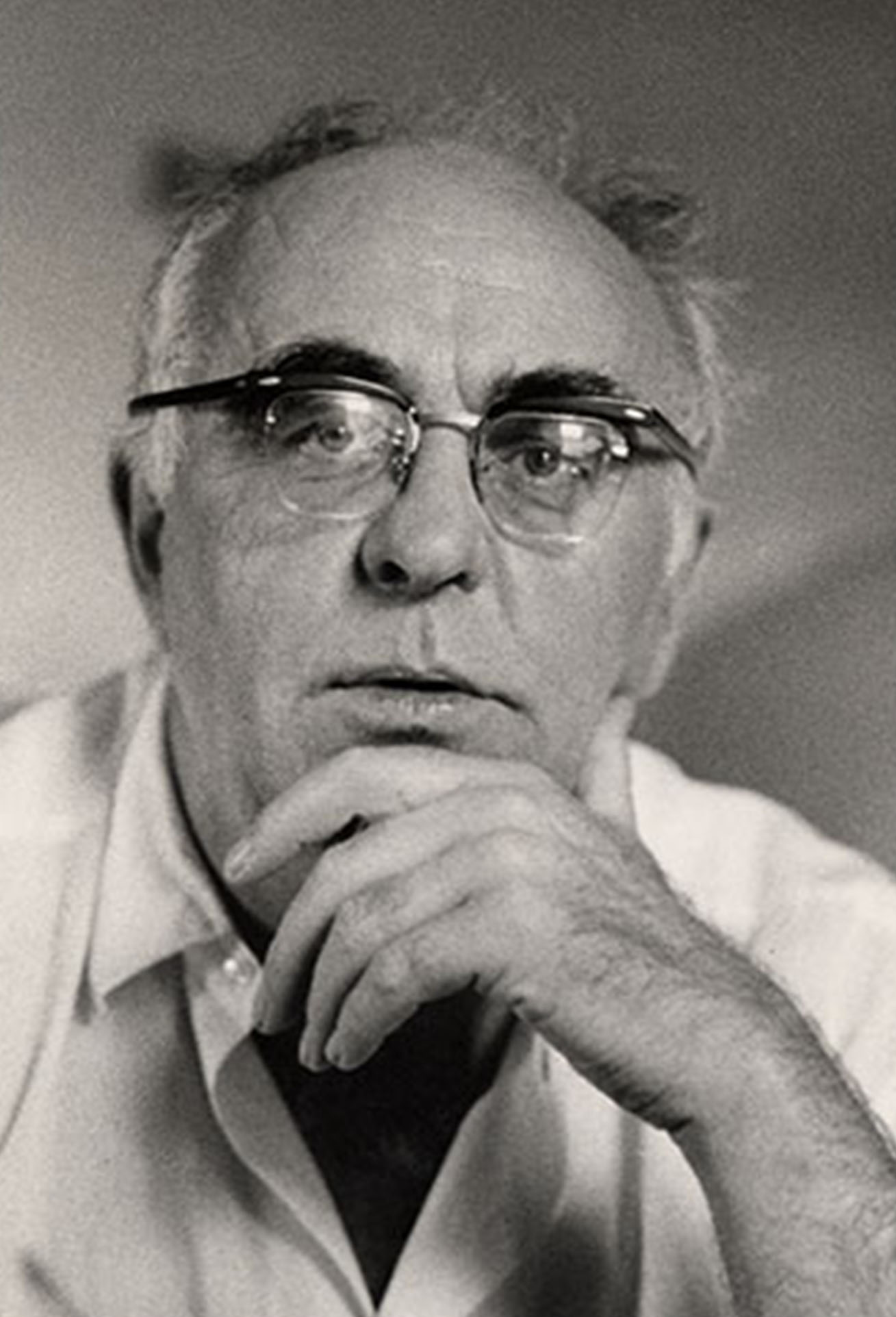
Charles Olson was a primary figure associated with the Black Mountain poets

The Black Mountain poets, also called projectivist poets, were a group of mid-20th-century American avant-garde or postmodern poets based at Black Mountain College in North Carolina.

== Historical background and definition ==
Although it lasted only twenty-three years (1933–1956) and enrolled fewer than 1,200 students, Black Mountain College was one of the most fabled experimental institutions in art education and practice. It launched a remarkable number of the artists who spearheaded the avant-garde in the America of the 1960s. It boasted an extraordinary curriculum in the visual, literary, and performing arts.

The literary movement traditionally described as the "Black Mountain Poets" centered around Charles Olson, who became a teacher at the college in 1948. Robert Creeley, who worked as a teacher and editor of the Black Mountain Review for two years, is considered to be another major figure. Creeley moved to San Francisco in 1957. There, he acted as a link between the Black Mountain poets and the Beats, many of whom he had published in the review. Members of the Black Mountain Poets include students and teachers at Black Mountain, together with their friends and correspondents.

The term was coined by Donald Allen in his anthology The New American Poetry 1945–1960 (which divides the poets included in its pages into various schools). He included Olson, Creeley, Ed Dorn, Robert Duncan, Denise Levertov, Larry Eigner, Joel Oppenheimer, Jonathan Williams, Paul Blackburn, and Paul Carroll in its members. Allen's definition of the Black Mountain poets proved to be crucial: it established a legacy and promoted their literary influence worldwide.

However, the exact definition of the group is considered disputable. Olson described the term as "bullshit" and stated that they never considered themselves a particular "clique" or had a particular form of poetics. Other principal figures often included in the Black Mountain poets include John Wieners, M. C. Richards, Hilda Morley, Francine du Plessix Gray, Fielding Dawson, Paul Goodman, and Arthur Penn.

== Poetics ==
The Black Mountain poets were largely free of literary convention, a feature which defined contemporary American poets. Their work became characterized by open form. Olson's pedagogical approach to poetry emphasized the importance of personal experience and direct observation, something which greatly influenced the Black Mountain poets. Many of the Black Mountain poets, including Levertov, Duncan, and Dorn, explored individual agency's potential to affect collective change through their political poetry.

=== Projective verse ===
In 1950, Charles Olson published his seminal essay, Projective Verse. In this, he called for a poetry of "open field" composition to replace traditional closed poetic forms with an improvised form that should reflect exactly the content of the poem. This form was to be based on the line, and each line was to be a unit of breath and of utterance. Olson felt that English poetry had become restricted by meter, syntax and rhyme instead of embracing the more natural constraints of breath and syllables which he felt would define true American poetics. The content was to consist of "one perception immediately and directly (leading) to a further perception". This essay was to become a kind of de facto manifesto for the Black Mountain poets. One of the effects of narrowing the unit of structure in the poem down to what could fit within an utterance was that the Black Mountain poets developed a distinctive style of poetic diction (e.g. "yr" for "your").

== Legacy ==
Apart from their strong interconnections with the Beats, the Black Mountain poets influenced the course of later American poetry via their importance for the poets later identified with the Language School. They were also important for the development of the innovative British Poetry Revival of the 1960s, as evidenced by such poets as Tom Raworth and J. H. Prynne. In Canada, the Vancouver-based TISH group, including George Bowering and Daphne Marlatt, were heavily influenced by the Black Mountain poets. Modern projectivist poets include Charles Potts.
