= Jeff Nuttall =

English writer (1933–2004)

- Born: Jeffrey Addison Nuttall; 8 July 1933; Clitheroe, Lancashire, England
- Died: 4 January 2004 (aged 70); Abergavenny, Monmouthshire, Wales
- Occupations: Poet; Publisher; Actor; Painter; Sculptor; Jazz trumpeter Anarchist sympathiser Social commentator

Jeffrey Addison Nuttall (8 July 1933 – 4 January 2004) was an English poet, performer, author, actor, teacher, painter, sculptor, jazz musician, anarchist and social commentator who was a key part of the British 1960s counter-culture. He was the brother of literary critic A. D. Nuttall.

== Life and work ==
Nuttall was born in Clitheroe, Lancashire, and grew up in Orcop, a village in Herefordshire. He studied at Hereford College of Art (1949–1951) and Bath Academy of Art, Corsham Court (1951–1953). He married Jane Louch, his former art teacher in 1954 and in the same year gained a teaching MA at The UCL Institute of Education followed by national service completed in 1956. With his family he moved to London in 1959 where he worked as a secondary school teacher in Finchley. He was active with the Campaign for Nuclear Disarmament (CND) until 1962. Then inspired by Alexander Trocchi and Peter Currell Brown, he committed himself to making art intended to increase social change.

He made connections with other avant-garde writers and artists in Group H including Bob Cobbing and John Latham. In 1963 Nuttall produced the first of 17 issues of My Own Mag with contributions from William Burroughs. MOM was one of the first underground magazines which were a defining feature of the 1960s counterculture.

During 1965 Nuttall staged early Happenings at Better Books in London.

An overload of creative work and marital difficulties caused Nuttall to retreat to the Abbey Art Centre where he formed The People Show in 1966, one of the first and longest lasting Performance Art groups. During 1967 he contributed regularly to International Times, and wrote Bomb Culture, his personal account and critical analysis of the birth of the alternative society. The book was published in 1968 and then in 1970 as a best selling Paladin paperback. During this time Nuttall was teaching and writing in Norwich and would move first to Bradford College of Art in 1969 and then to Leeds Polytechnic Fine Art Department where he was a senior lecturer for ten years from 1970 to 1981. Nuttall was active in Performance Art collaborating with Rose McGuire (Priscilla Beecham), and influencing other performers and students including Marc Almond. His presence in the Fine Art department did much to define the radical creative ethos at Leeds.

He was elected Chairman of the National Society of Poetry in 1975 and with Eric Mottram tried to introduce radical modernist poetry occasioning the Poetry Wars. From 1979 to 1981 Nuttall was poetry critic for The Guardian.

Appointed Head of Fine Art at Liverpool Polytechnic in 1981, his tenure was marked by controversial teaching initiatives, residencies at Deakin University, Australia, and increasing alcohol consumption, all of which contributed to his early departure in 1984.

With his last partner, Jill Richards, he moved to Abergavenny in Wales in 1991, and later to Crickhowell. His creative output continued with soft sculptures, landscape paintings, poetry, and writing. His last two books were Art and the Degradation of Awareness (1999) and Selected Poems (2003). He died aged 70 on 4 January 2004 at the Hen and Chickens pub (known as the Hen and Chicks) in Abergavenny, where his jazz band had performed regularly for ten years.

== Literary works ==
Nuttall was the author of over 40 books. These included novels (Snipe's Spinster (1975)); poetry (Objects (1976)); cultural commentary (Common Factors/Vulgar Factions, with Rodick Carmichael (1977)); and biography (King Twist: A Portrait of Frank Randle (1978)).

- Poems (1963), with Keith Musgrove
- The Limbless Virtuoso (1963), with Keith Musgrove
- The Change (1963), Allen Ginsberg (cover design)
- My Own Mag (1963–66)
- Poems I Want to Forget (1965)
- Come Back Sweet Prince: A Novelette (1966)
- Pieces of Poetry (1966)
- The Case of Isabel and the Bleeding Foetus (1967)
- Songs Sacred and Secular (1967)
- Bomb Culture (1968), Cultural criticism and memoir.
- Penguin Modern Poets 12 (1968), with Alan Jackson and William Wantling
- Journals (1968)
- Love Poems (1969)
- Mr. Watkins Got Drunk and Had to Be Carried Home: A Cut-up Piece (1969)
- Pig (1969)
- Jeff Nuttall: Poems 1962–1969 (1970)
- Oscar Christ and the Immaculate Conception (1970)
- George, Son of My Own Mag (1971)
- The Foxes' Lair (1972)
- Fatty Feedemall's Secret Self: A Dream (1975)
- The Anatomy of My Father's Corpse (1975)
- Man Not Man (1975)
- The House Party (1975)
- Snipe's Spinster (novel, 1975)
- Objects (1976)
- Common Factors, Vulgar Factions (1977), with Rodick Carmichael
- King Twist: a Portrait of Frank Randle (1978), biography of music hall comedian
- The Gold Hole (1978)
- What Happened to Jackson (1978)
- Grape Notes, Apple Music (1979)
- Performance Art (1979/80), memoirs and scripts, two volumes
- 5X5 (1981), with Glen Baxter, Ian Breakwell, Ivor Cutler and Anthony Earnshaw (edited by Asa Benveniste)
- Muscle (1982)
- Visual Alchemy (1987), with Bohuslav Barlow
- The Bald Soprano. A Portrait of Lol Coxhill (1989)
- Art and the Degradation of Awareness (1999)
- Selected Poems (2003)

== Selected filmography ==
- Scandal (1989) – Percy Murray, Club Owner
- Robin Hood (1991) – Friar Tuck
- Just like a Woman (1992) – Vanessa
- Damage (1992) – Trevor Leigh Davies MP
- The Baby of Mâcon (1993) – The Major Domo
- The Browning Version (1994) – Lord Baxter
- Captives (1994) – Harold
- Paparazzo (1995) – Lionel
- Beaumarchais (1996) – Benjamin Franklin
- Crimetime (1996) – Doctor
- Monk Dawson (1998) – Sir Hugh Stanten
- Plunkett & Macleane (1999) – Lord Morris
- The World Is Not Enough (1999) – Dr. Mikhail Arkov, a Russian nuclear physicist whom Bond goes undercover as.
- Octopus (2000) – Henry Campbell
- Anazapta (2002) – Priest
