= Bob Cobbing =

English poet

Bob Cobbing (30 July 1920 – 29 September 2002) was a British sound, visual, concrete and performance poet who was a central figure in the British Poetry Revival.

== Early life ==
Cobbing was born in Enfield. He attended Enfield Grammar School and then trained as an accountant. He later went to Bognor Training College to become a teacher. During the Second World War, he was a conscientious objector.

== Early involvement with poetry and performance ==
His involvement with performance began with the Hendon Experimental Art Club and the Hendon-based magazine And in 1951. This led to his setting up Writers Forum, which began publishing in 1963. In 1964 he published ABC in Sound, a book that combined his interest in sound and concrete poetry in an exploration of the visual and auditory possibilities of the English alphabet.

== Better Books ==
He left teaching around this time and managed Better Books on Charing Cross Road, London. Better Books was more than a mere bookshop. Once described as a ‘mini Arts Lab’ it served as stage, cinema and gallery. Its cross-disciplinary approach welcomed new art forms like assemblage, performance art, and radical poetry. Together with other alternative galleries such as 26 Kingly Street and Indica Bookshop, Better Books was one of the hot spots of the London underground scene.

This shop was the venue for a number of events and happenings associated with what Cobbing's friend Jeff Nuttall termed the Bomb Culture, the British version of the 1960s counterculture. As an evolution of the earlier Hendon Film Society he began avant-garde film screenings under the title Cinema 65 which led to the formation of the London Film-Makers' Co-op

== 1970s ==
During the first half of the 1970s, Cobbing was able to use the facilities of the Poetry Society to produce Writers Forum books. In all, the press published over 1,000 titles between 1963 and 2002. As well as fostering the younger poets of the British Poetry Revival, Writers Forum also published works by John Cage, Allen Ginsberg and Ian Hamilton Finlay. Writers Forum also ran a regular Saturday afternoon writers' workshop at which poets read and discussed each other's work.

In the early 1970s the Poetry Society did not have any printing facilities. Cobbing had his own equipment elsewhere throughout the 40 years of his (largely solo) operation of Writers Forum. In the mid-1970s, against tremendous opposition of the rump of the old guard on the Poetry Society General Council, Cobbing and others opened a public print shop on the society's premises. Cobbing brought in his own equipment and allowed it to be used by anyone wishing to print their own book of poetry. Later the society provided a desktop litho, plate-maker and golfball typewriter with a diversion of the funds allocated to Poetry Review which was henceforth, for some years, printed in house.

Cobbing also explored his interest in performance works for multiple voices and musical instruments in groups like abAna (a trio with Paul Burwell and David Toop, and sextet with the addition of Lyn Conetta, Herman Hauge and Christopher Small), Bird Yak and Konkrete Canticle, which included poets Paula Claire and Bill Griffiths and musician Michael Chant. He was also co-founder of the Association of Little Presses, an organisation that promoted the work of small publishers in Britain and Ireland.

== Later life and work ==
In 1980 he appeared as a duo with Henri Chopin on the album 'Miniatures - a sequence of fifty-one tiny masterpieces' (51 one-minute tracks by contemporary artists and musicians) produced by Morgan Fisher. Cobbing was a prolific writer and performer and continued to work right up to his death. In 2000, he performed with Lawrence Upton and Derek Shiel at The Klinker, Islington, London.

He also used his teacher training to work on performances with schoolchildren. Much of his later work consists of visual texts, artist's books and markings that were used as notations or, more strictly speaking, jumping off points for performance. He also worked on more directly collaborative works with other poets, such as the Domestic Ambient Noise project, a series of 300 booklets created with his friend and fellow Writers Forum editor Lawrence Upton. Since Cobbing's death, Upton has carried on the work of running Writers Forum.

Cobbing created seventeen pamphlets/sheets entitled Processual from 1982 to 1985, deploying his photocopier as a poetic tool; he also composed the Third ABC in Sound in 2000, aged 80.

== Legacy ==
In 2005, the British Library acquired The Papers of Bob Cobbing consisting of personal material, correspondence, his works, and papers relating to Writers Forum, to the Association of Little Presses (ALP), and to the New River Project.

== Publication ==
"Boooook: The Life and Work of Bob Cobbing" (published by Occasional Papers, 2015) is the first comprehensive overview of the life and work of Cobbing. It addresses all aspects of Cobbing's rich career, with new essays detailing his key roles in London Film-makers’ Co-op, Better Books, abAna, as well as his involvement in the Destruction in Art Symposium, Fylkingen, and his publishing imprint Writers Forum.
