= Basil Bunting =

English modernist poet (1900–1985)

- Born: Basil Cheesman Bunting; 1 March 1900; Scotswood-on-Tyne, Northumberland, England
- Died: 17 April 1985 (aged 85); Hexham, Northumberland, England
- Resting place: Quaker graveyard at Brigflatts, Sedbergh, Cumbria, England
- Education: London School of Economics (did not graduate)
- Occupations: Poet, military intelligence analyst, diplomat, journalist
- Spouses: Marian Gray Culver (m. 1930–1940); Sima Alladadian (m. 1948–1979)
- Children: 5
- Writing career
- Notable work: "Briggflatts" (1966)
- Movement: Modernism

Basil Cheesman Bunting (1 March 1900 – 17 April 1985) was an English modernist poet whose reputation was established with the publication of Briggflatts in 1966, generally regarded as one of the major achievements of the modernist tradition in English. He had a lifelong interest in music that led him to emphasise the sonic qualities of poetry, particularly the importance of reading poetry aloud: he was an accomplished reader of his own work.

== Life and career ==
Born into a Quaker family in Scotswood-on-Tyne, near Newcastle upon Tyne, he studied at two Quaker schools: from 1912 to 1916 at Ackworth School in the West Riding of Yorkshire and from 1916 to 1918 at Leighton Park School in Berkshire. His Quaker education strongly influenced his pacifist opposition to the First World War, and in 1918 he was arrested as a conscientious objector having been refused recognition by the tribunals and refusing to comply with a notice of call-up. Handed over to the military, he was court-martialled for refusing to obey orders, and served a sentence of more than a year in Wormwood Scrubs and Winchester prisons. Bunting's friend Louis Zukofsky described him as a "conservative/anti-fascist/imperialist", though Bunting himself listed the major influences on his artistic and personal outlook somewhat differently as "Jails and the sea, Quaker mysticism and socialist politics, a lasting unlucky passion, the slums of Lambeth and Hoxton ..."

These events were to have an important role in his first major poem, "Villon" (1925). "Villon" was one of a rather rare set of complex structured poems that Bunting labelled "sonatas", thus underlining the sonic qualities of his verse and recalling his love of music. Other "sonatas" include "Attis: or, Something Missing", "Aus Dem Zweiten Reich", "The Well of Lycopolis", "The Spoils" and, finally, "Briggflatts". After his release from prison in 1919, traumatised by the time spent there, Bunting went to London, where he enrolled in the London School of Economics, and had his first contacts with journalists, social activists and Bohemia. Bunting was introduced to the works of Ezra Pound by Nina Hamnett who lent him a copy of Homage to Sextus Propertius. The glamour of the cosmopolitan modernist examples of Nina Hamnett and Mina Loy seems to have influenced Bunting in his later move from London to Paris.

After travelling in Northern Europe, Bunting left the London School of Economics without a degree and went to France. There, in 1923, he became friendly with Ezra Pound, who years later would dedicate his Guide to Kulchur (1938) to both Bunting and Louis Zukofsky, "strugglers in the desert". Between February and October 1927, Bunting wrote articles and reviews for The Outlook, and then became its music critic until the magazine ceased publication in 1928. Bunting's poetry began to show the influence of the friendship with Pound, whom he visited in Rapallo, Italy, and later settled there with his family from 1931 to 1933. He was published in the Objectivist issue of Poetry magazine, in the Objectivist Anthology, and in Pound's Active Anthology.

In the 1930s, Bunting became interested in medieval Persian literature, studied the language to some degree, and began publishing adaptations of Persian poems by Ferdowsi, Manuchehri, Sa’di, Hafez, and Obayd Zakani; their use of sound patterning seems to have influenced his own.

During and immediately after the Second World War, Bunting served in British Military Intelligence in Persia. According to a 1979 interview he gave to British writer Sam Milne, Bunting was first assigned to British Middle East Command in Cairo in 1943, and later was made chief of political intelligence in Persia, Iraq, and Saudi Arabia, based in Tehran for several years. When asked about the selection process used to gain that assignment, Milne reported that Bunting "said all he could remember was being asked if he could hold his alcohol, and replying, 'Try me.'"

In 1948, he became the correspondent for The Times in Iran and left government service. He married a Kurdish woman, Sima Alladadian, who was thirty years his junior. Because of his marriage to the underage girl, Bunting was fired from the British embassy.

Back in Newcastle, he worked as a sub-editor (US copy editor) on the Evening Chronicle until his rediscovery during the 1960s by young poets, notably Tom Pickard and Jonathan Williams, who were interested in working in the modernist tradition. In 1966, he published his major long poem, Briggflatts, named after the village in Cumbria where he is now buried in the Quaker graveyard.

In later life, Bunting published Advice to Young Poets, beginning "I SUGGEST / 1. Compose aloud; poetry is a sound."

Bunting died in 1985 in Hexham, Northumberland.

The Basil Bunting Poetry Award and Young Person's Prize, administered by Newcastle University, are open internationally to any poet writing in English.

=== Briggflatts ===
Divided into five parts and noted for its intricate use of sound and resonances with medieval literature, Briggflatts is an autobiographical long poem, looking back on teenage love and on Bunting's involvement in the high modernist period. In addition, Briggflatts can be read as a meditation on the limits of life and a celebration of Northumbrian culture and dialect, as symbolised by events and figures like the doomed Viking King Eric Bloodaxe. The critic Cyril Connolly was among the first to recognise the poem's value, describing it as "the finest long poem to have been published in England since T. S. Eliot's Four Quartets".

=== Portrait bust of Basil Bunting ===
Basil Bunting sat in Northumberland for sculptor Alan Thornhill, with a resulting terracotta (for bronze) in existence. The correspondence file relating to the Bunting portrait bust is held as part of the Thornhill Papers (2006:56) in the archive of the Henry Moore Foundation's Henry Moore Institute in Leeds and the terracotta remains in the collection of the artist. The 1973 portrait is displayed in the Burton (2014) biography of Bunting.

== Books ==
- 1930: Redimiculum Matellarum (privately printed)
- 1950: Poems (Cleaners' Press, 1950) revised and published as Loquitur (Fulcrum Press, 1965).
- 1951: The Spoils
- 1965: First Book of Odes
- 1965: Ode II/2
- 1966: Briggflatts: An Autobiography
- 1967: Two Poems
- 1967: What the chairman Told Tom
- 1968: Collected Poems
- 1972: Version of Horace
- 1991: Uncollected Poems (posthumous, edited by Richard Caddel)
- 1994: The Complete Poems (posthumous, edited by Richard Caddel)
- 1999: Basil Bunting on Poetry (posthumous, edited by Peter Makin)
- 2000: Complete Poems (posthumous, edited by Richard Caddel)
- 2009: Briggflatts (with audio CD and video DVD)
- 2012: Bunting's Persia (translations by Basil Bunting, edited by Don Share)
- 2016: The Poems of Basil Bunting (posthumous, edited, with intro and commentary by Don Share)
- 2022: Letters of Basil Bunting (selected and edited by Alex Niven)
