= Irish poetry =

Poetry by poets from Ireland

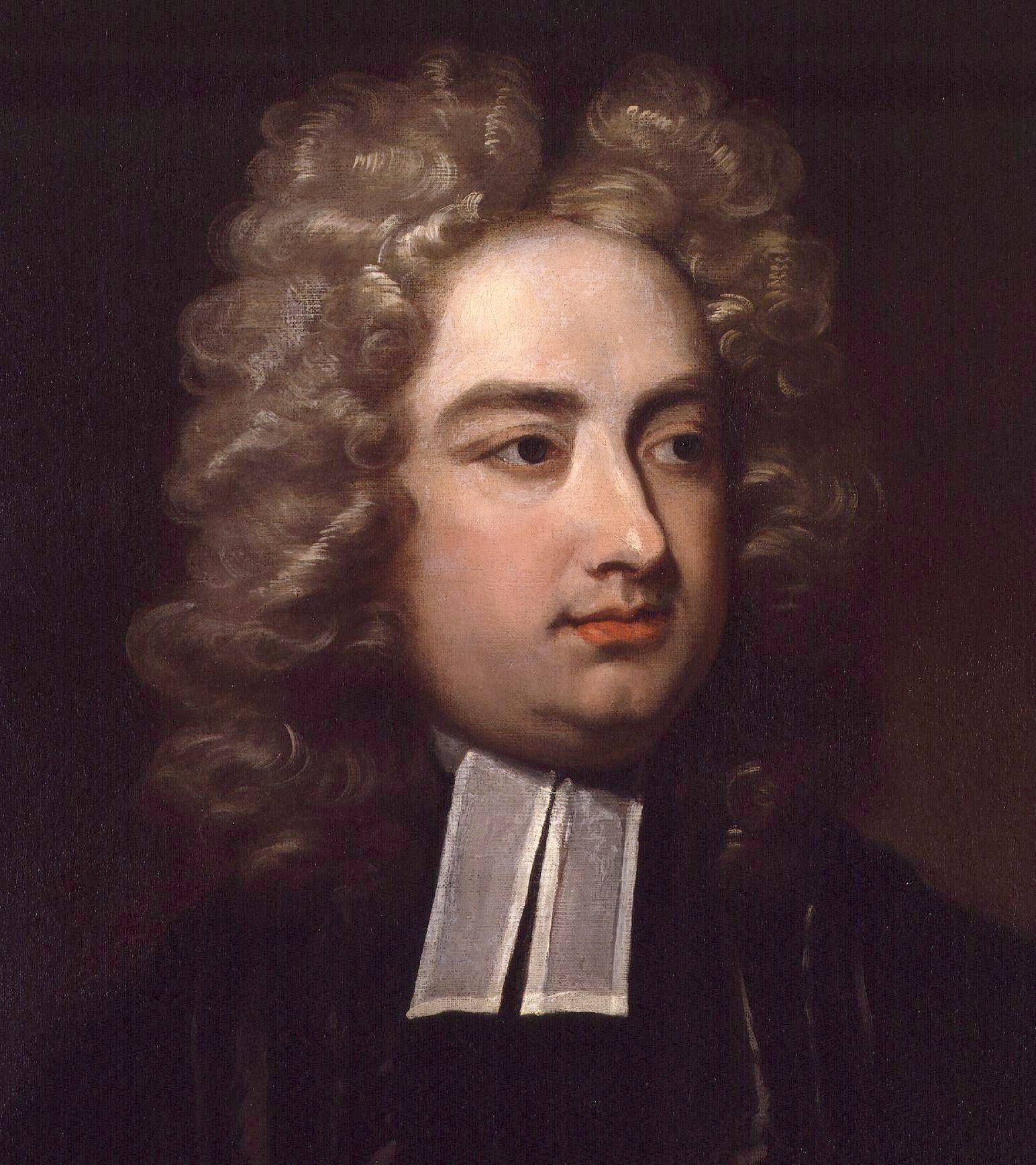
Jonathan Swift (1667–1745)

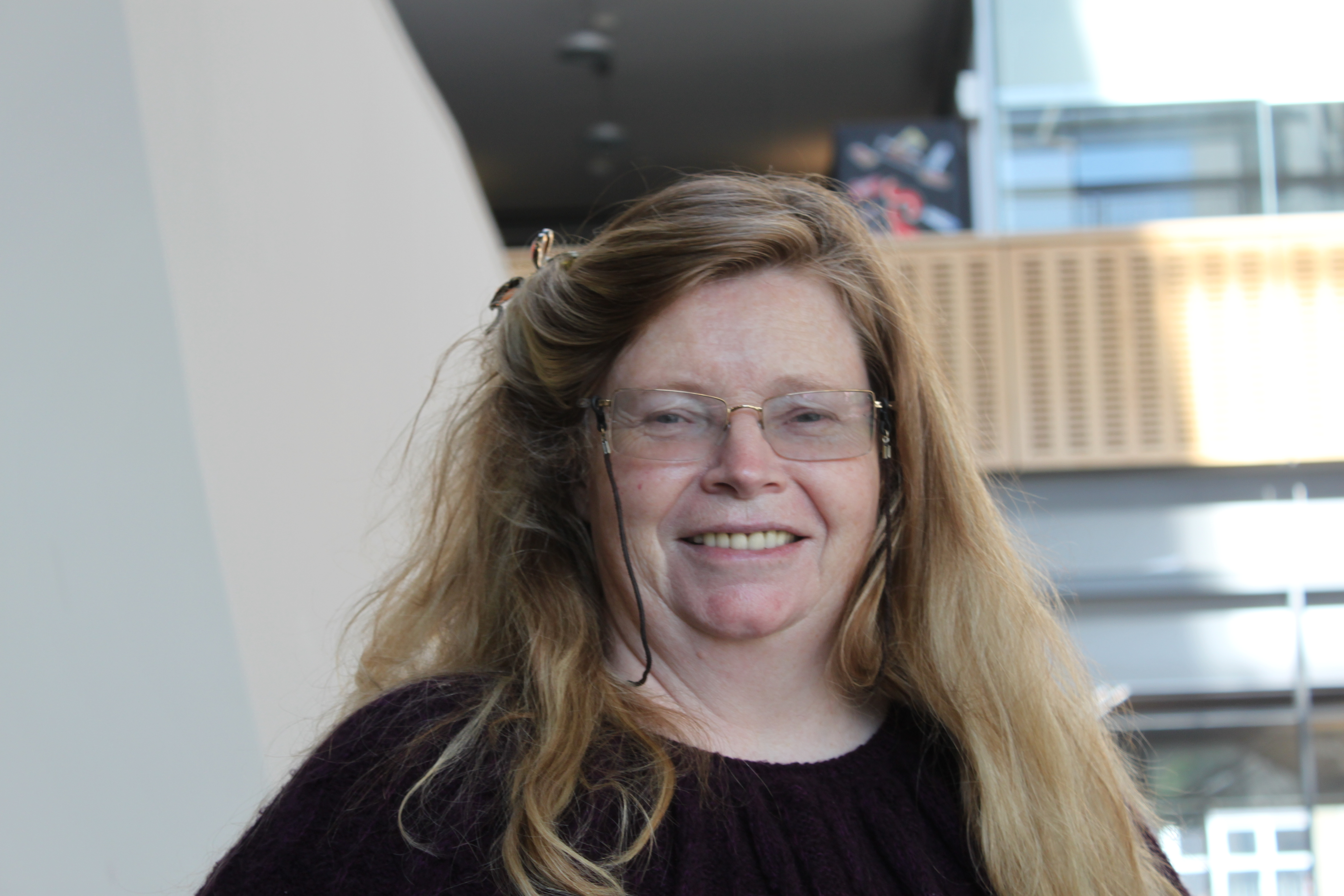
The Irish-language poet Nuala Ní Dhomhnaill

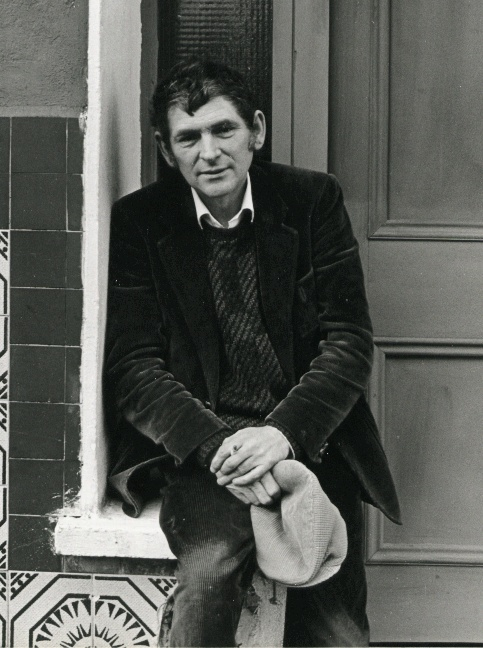
Michael Hartnett, bilingual poet

Irish poetry is poetry written by poets from Ireland, politically the Republic of Ireland and Northern Ireland today. It is mainly written in Irish, though some is in English, Scottish Gaelic and others in Hiberno-Latin. The complex interplay between the two main traditions, and between both of them and other poetries in English and Scottish Gaelic, has produced a body of work that is both rich in variety and difficult to categorise.

The earliest surviving written poems in Irish date back to the 6th century, while the first known poems in English from Ireland date to the 14th century. Although there has always been some cross-fertilisation between the two language traditions, an English-language poetry that had absorbed themes and models from Irish did not finally emerge until the 19th century. This culminated in the work of the poets of the Irish Literary Revival in the late 19th and early 20th century.

Towards the last quarter of the 20th century, modern Irish poetry tended to a wide range of diversity, from the poets of the Northern school to writers influenced by the modernist tradition and those facing questions posed by an increasingly urban and cosmopolitan society.

== Early Irish poetry ==
Literacy reached Ireland with Christianity in the fifth century. Monasteries were established, which by the seventh century were large, self-governing institutions and centres of scholarship. This was to have a profound effect on Irish-language literature, poetry included.

The earliest Irish poetry was unrhymed, and has been described as follows: "It is alliterative syllabic verse, lyric in form and heroic in content, in praise of famous men, or in lament for the death of a hero". It survived as epic interludes in Irish sagas in the early modern period.

The monastic poets borrowed from both native and Latin traditions to create elaborate syllabic verse forms, and used them for religious and nature poetry. The typical combination of end-rhyme, internal rhyme and alliteration came originally from the example of late Latin hymns, as elaborated by Irish monks. The new metres are the vehicle for monastic lyric poems inspired by love of Nature, love of solitude and love of the Divine which have been described as the finest Irish poetry of their age, and which could be extended to cover more personal concerns. An example is a long poem which is put into the mouth of Marbán the hermit, brother of Guaire, king of Connacht, and of which the following is an excerpt:

Fogur gaíthe
fri fid flescach,
forglas néol;
essa aba,
esnad ala,
álainn céol.

Translation:

Sound of the wind in a branching wood, grey cloud; river-falls, cry of a swan – beautiful music.

The professional secular poets continued to praise and lament famous men, but adopted the new verse forms, which in time would be codified in classical form under the name Dán Díreach.

== Medieval/early modern ==
Irish bards formed a professional hereditary caste of highly trained, learned poets. The bards were steeped in the history and traditions of clan and country, as well as in the technical requirements of a verse technique that was syllabic and used assonance, half rhyme and alliteration known as Dán Díreach.

As officials of the court of king or chieftain, they performed a number of official roles. They were chroniclers and satirists whose job it was to praise their employers and damn those who crossed them. It was believed that a well-aimed bardic satire, glam dicin, could raise boils on the face of its target. However, much of their work would not strike the modern reader as being poetry at all, consisting as it does of extended genealogies and almost journalistic accounts of the deeds of their lords and ancestors.

The Metrical Dindshenchas, or Lore of Places, is probably the major surviving monument of Irish bardic verse. It is a great onomastic anthology of naming legends of significant places in the Irish landscape and comprises about 176 poems in total. The earliest of these date from the 11th century, and were probably originally compiled on a provincial basis. As a national compilation, the Metrical Dindshenchas has come down to us in two different recensions. Knowledge of the real or putative history of local places formed an important part of the education of the elite in ancient Ireland, so the Dindshenchas was probably a kind of textbook in origin.

Verse tales of Fionn and the Fianna, sometimes known as Ossianic poetry, were extremely common in Ireland and Scotland throughout this period. Originally sung in verse and exactly on par with heroic epics from other cultures, they were written down and significantly altered by James Macpherson in the 18th century. Macpherson's treatment of them was said to have ushered in the Romance tradition as opposed to the epic nature of the sagas. The Fionn poems form one of the three key sagas of Celtic culture: The Ulster saga, Fionn mac Cumhaill saga, and those of the Arthurian legends.

British Library Manuscript, Harley 913, is a group of poems written in Ireland in the early 14th century. They are usually called the Kildare Poems because of their association with that county. Both poems and manuscript have strong Franciscan associations and are full of ideas from the wider Western European Christian tradition. They also represent the early stages of the second tradition of Irish poetry, that of poetry in the English language, as they were written in Middle English.

During the Elizabethan reconquest, two of the most significant English poets of the time saw service in the Irish colonies. Sir Walter Raleigh had little impact on the course of Irish literature, but the time spent in Munster by Edmund Spenser was to have serious consequences both for his own writings and for the future course of cultural development in Ireland. Spenser's relationship with Ireland was somewhat ambiguous. On the one hand, an idealised Munster landscape forms the backdrop for much of the action for his masterpiece, The Faerie Queene. On the other, he condemned Ireland and everything Irish as barbaric in his prose polemic A View of the Present State of Ireland. In A View, he describes the Irish bards as being:

soe far from instructinge younge men in Morrall discipline, that they themselves doe more deserve to be sharplie decyplined; for they seldome use to chuse unto themselves the doinges of good men, for the ornamentes of theire poems, but whomesoever they finde to bee most lycentious of lief, most bolde and lawles in his doinges, most daungerous and desperate in all partes of disobedience and rebellious disposicon, him they sett up and glorifie in their rymes, him they prayse to the people, and to younge men make an example to followe.

Given that the bards depended on aristocratic support to survive, and that the balance of power was shifting towards the new Anglo-Irish landlords, Spenser's condemnation of the Bards' preference for outlawed Clan Chiefs over the new elite may well have contributed to their demise as a caste.

== Gaelic poetry in the 17th century ==
The Battle of Kinsale in 1601 saw the defeat of Aodh Mór Ó Néill, despite his alliance with the Spanish, and the ultimate victory in the Elizabethan conquest of Ireland came with his surrender to crown authority in 1603. In consequence, the system of education and patronage that underpinned the professional bardic schools came under pressure, and the hereditary poets eventually engaged in a spat - the Contention of the bards - that marked the end of their ancient influence. During the early 17th century a new Gaelic poetry took root, one that sought inspiration in the margins of a dispossessed Irish-speaking society. The language of this poetry is today called Early Modern Irish. Although some 17th-century poets continued to enjoy a degree of patronage, many, if not most, of them were part-time writers who also worked on the land, as teachers, and anywhere that they could earn their keep. Their poetry also changed, with a move away from the syllabic verse of the schools to accentual metres, reflecting the oral poetry of the bardic period. A good deal of the poetry of this period deals with political and historical themes that reflect the poets' sense of a world lost.

The poets adapted to the new English-dominated order in several ways. Some of them continued to find patronage among the Gaelic Irish and Old English aristocracy. Some of the English landowners settled in Ireland after the Plantations of Ireland also patronised Irish poets, for instance George Carew and Roger Boyle. Other members of hereditary bardic families sent their sons to the new Irish Colleges that had been set up in Catholic Europe for the education of Irish Catholics, who were not permitted to found schools or universities at home. Much of the Irish poetry of the 17th century was therefore composed by Catholic clerics and Irish society fell increasingly under Counter-Reformation influences. By mid-century, the subordination of the native Catholic upper classes in Ireland boiled over in the Irish Rebellion of 1641. Many Irish language poets wrote highly politicised poetry in support of the Irish Catholics organised in Confederate Ireland. For instance, the cleric poet Pádraigín Haicéad wrote, Éirigh mo Dhúiche le Dia ("Arise my Country with God") in support of the rebellion, which advised that

Caithfidh fir Éireann uile
o haicme go haonduine...
gliec na timcheall no tuitim

Translation:

All Irishmen from one person to all people must unite or fall

Another of Haicéad's poems Muscail do mhisneach a Banbha ('Gather your courage oh Ireland') in 1647 encouraged the Irish Catholic war effort in the Irish Confederate Wars. It expressed the opinion that Catholics should not tolerate Protestantism in Ireland,

Creideamh Chríost le creideamh Lúiteir...
ladgadh gris i sneachta sud

Translation:

The religion of Christ with the religion of Luther is like ashes in the snow

Following the defeat of the Irish Catholics in the Cromwellian conquest of Ireland (1649–53), and the destruction of the old Irish landed classes, many poets wrote mourning the fallen order or lamenting the destruction and repression of the Cromwellian conquest. The anonymous poem an Siogai Romanach went,

Ag so an cogadh do chriochnaigh Éire
s do chuir na milte ag iarri dearca...
Do rith plaig is gorta in aonacht

Translation:

This was the war that finished Ireland and put thousands begging, plague and famine ran together

Another poem by Éamonn an Dúna is a strange mixture of Irish, French and English,

Le execution bhíos súil an cheidir
costas buinte na chuine ag an ndeanach

Translation:

The first thing a man expects is execution, the last that costs be awarded against him [in court]

Transport transplant, mo mheabhair ar Bhéarla'
A tory, hack him, hang him, a rebel,
a rogue, a thief a priest, a papist

Translation:

Transport transplant, is what I remember of English...

After this period, the poets lost most of their patrons and protectors. In the subsequent Williamite War in Ireland Catholic Jacobites tried to recover their position by supporting James II of England. Dáibhi Ó Bruadair wrote many poems in praise of the Jacobite war effort and in particular of his hero, Patrick Sarsfield. The poets viewed the war as revenge against the Protestant settlers who had come to dominate Ireland, as the following poem extract makes clear,

You Popish rogue", ni leomhaid a labhairt sinn
acht "Cromwellian dog" is focal faire againn
no " cia sud thall" go teann gan eagla
"Mise Tadhg" geadh teinn an t-agallamh

Translation:

"You Popish rogue" is not spoken
but "Cromwellian dog" is our watchword
"Who goes there" does not provoke fear
"I am Tadhg" [an Irishman] is the answer given

The Jacobites' defeat in the War, and in particular James II's ignominious flight after the Battle of the Boyne, gave rise to the following derisive verse,

Séamus an chaca a chaill Éire,
lena leathbhróg ghallda is a leathbhróg Ghaelach

Translation:

James the shit who lost Ireland,
with his one shoe English and one shoe Irish

The main poets of this period include Dáibhí Ó Bruadair (1625?–1698), Piaras Feiritéar (1600?–1653) and Aogán Ó Rathaille (1675–1729). Ó Rathaille belongs as much to the 18th as the 17th century and his work, including the introduction of the aisling genre, marks something of a transition to a post-Battle of the Boyne Ireland.

=== Female poets ===
The first part of the seventeenth century saw three notable female poets (all born in the previous century).

Brighid Nic Gearailt (Brighid Chill Dara) (c. 1589–1682) was the wife of Rudhraighe Ó Domhnaill, one of the O'Donnell dynasty who left Ireland as part of the Flight of the Earls. Her sole surviving work is A Mhacaoimh Dhealbhas an Dán, a witty and elegant reply in classical metre to a verse letter sent to her on behalf of Cú Chonnacht Óg Mág Uidhir by Eochaidh Ó hEoghusa, a notable poet of the time.

Fionnghuala Ní Bhriain (Inghean Dhomhnaill Uí Bhriain) (c. 1557–1657), a member of the O'Brien dynasty, who had been Chiefs of the Name and Earls of Thomond, wrote a lament (her only surviving poem) for her husband, Uaithne Ó Lochlainn, Chief of the Name and Lord of Burren in County Clare.

Caitilín Dubh (fl. 1624), whose patrons were also the O’Brien dynasty, wrote for them a series of laments in the new accentual metres.

== The 18th century ==
The eighteenth century saw the flourishing of highly literate, technically adept poets in the Irish language. This period saw the triumph of popular accentual metres, as opposed to the elaborate syllabic metres which had prevailed until then. These accentual metres, however, still featured a complex system of internal rhymes, and it is likely that they had been in use for some centuries previously. The poets themselves seldom had patrons to support them and supported themselves with such occupations as farming or teaching.

A salient figure at this time is Aogán Ó Rathaille (1670–1726), a bridge between the old world in which he was educated and the new one in which the professional poet had no place. He wrote in the new metres but preserved the attitudes of a previous age.

Dublin was a centre of Irish-language poetry in the first half of the eighteenth century, due to the presence there of Seán Ó Neachtain, his son Tadhg and the circle of writers they gathered around them. Seán wrote both in Irish and English, but Irish was his primary language and he wrote poems in it of many kinds – Fenian poems, love poems, drinking songs, satires and religious poems.

In 1728 Tadhg wrote a poem in which there is a description of the members of the Ó Neachtain literary circle: twenty-six people are mentioned, mostly from Leinster but with others from every province.

Outside Dublin, it was in the province of Munster that the status and craft of Irish-language poetry were best maintained. Sometimes a local clan chief or Anglo-Irish landlord acted as their patron, but in other places responsibility lay with cúirteanna filíochta – "courts of poetry" or local gatherings for the purpose of contests between poets, similar to the Welsh Eisteddfod. These could be seen as offshoots of the bardic academies which trained professional poets down to the seventeenth century.

The best-known members of this network of poets included Seán Ó Tuama (c. 1706–1775), Aindrias Mac Craith (died c. 1795), Liam Ruadh Mac Coitir and Seamus McMurphy (Seán na Ráithíneach). Their poetry illuminates daily life and personalities of the period – landlord and tenant, the priest and the teacher, the poet and the craftsman, the marketplace, marriage and burial, music and folklore.

The craft of poetry was also cultivated in south Ulster, where poets would similarly come together to compete for primacy. They included a handful of women, including Máire (or Mailligh) Nic a Liondain and Peig Ní Chuarta.

Among the most prominent names in Munster is Eoghan Rua Ó Súilleabháin, schoolmaster, sailor, soldier, and a rake by reputation. His verse was highly finished and intensely musical, and he was best known for his vision poems. This genre, and the Munster tradition of the cúirteanna filíochta – "courts of poetry", were parodied by Brian Merriman in his lengthy comic poem Cúirt An Mheán Oíche. In the poem, the women of Ireland sue the men for refusing to marry and father children, before the judgement seat of Aoibheall, a member of the Tuatha De Danaan who, since Saint Patrick, has been demoted from goddess to being the local fairy queen.

Alongside the work of the literate poets there flourished a traditional oral literature. One of its products was the caoineadh or traditional lament, a genre dominated by women and typically characterised by improvisation and passion. Countless numbers were composed; one of the few to have survived is Caoineadh Airt Uí Laoghaire. This was mostly composed by a noblewoman from the Roman Catholic O'Connell family of Derrynane House, who continued to rule over their tenants in County Kerry like the Chiefs of an Irish clan. The poet was Eibhlín Dubh Ní Chonaill (an aunt of Daniel O'Connell), after her husband, Art O'Leary, was outlawed for refusing to sell his pedigreed stallion to a local Anglo-Irish judge, hunted down, and shot dead by a posse of redcoats acting under the judge's personal command. It is considered to be an outstanding example of the type.

=== Swift and Goldsmith ===
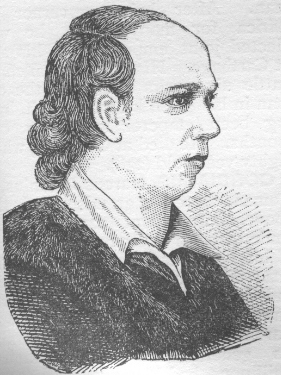
Oliver Goldsmith

In Jonathan Swift (1667–1745), Irish literature in English found its first notable writer. Although best known for prose works like Gulliver's Travels and A Tale of a Tub, Swift was a poet of considerable talent. Technically close to his English contemporaries Pope and Dryden, Swift's poetry evinces the same tone of savage satire, and horror of the human body and its functions that characterises much of his prose. Swift also published translations of poems from the Irish.

Oliver Goldsmith (1730?–1774) started his literary career as a hack writer in London, writing on any subject that would pay enough to keep his creditors at bay. He came to belong to the circle of Samuel Johnson, Edmund Burke and Sir Joshua Reynolds. His reputation depends mainly on a novel, The Vicar of Wakefield, a play, She Stoops to Conquer, and two long poems, The Traveller and The Deserted Village. The last of these may be the first and best poem by an Irish poet in the English pastoral tradition. It has been variously interpreted as a lament for the death of Irish village life under British rule and a protest at the effects of agricultural reform on the English rural landscape.

=== Weaver Poets and vernacular writing ===
Local cultural differences in areas such as north and east Ulster produced minor, and often only loosely associated, vernacular movements that do not readily fit into the categories of Irish or English literature. For example, the Ulster Weaver Poets wrote in an Ulster Scots dialect.

Working-class or popular in nature, remaining examples are mostly limited to publication in self-published privately subscribed limited print runs, newspapers, and journals of the time.

The promotion of standard English in education gradually reduced the visibility and influence of such movements. In addition, the polarising effects of the politics of the use of English and Irish language traditions also limited academic and public interest until the studies of John Hewitt from the 1950s onwards. Further impetus was given by more generalised exploration of non-"Irish" and non-"English" cultural identities in the latter decades of the 20th century.

== The 19th century ==
During the course of the 19th century, political and economic factors resulted in the decline of the Irish language and the concurrent rise of English as the main language of Ireland. This fact is reflected in the poetry of the period.

The folk tradition of poetry in Irish (usually expressed in song) retained its vigour in the 19th century, often combing assonance and alliteration to considerable effect. Songs of all sorts were common in Irish-speaking areas before Ireland's Great Famine of the 1840s - love songs such as Dónall Óg and Úna Bhán, songs about the ancient heroes of the Fianna, working songs, religious songs, laments, humorous and satirical songs, lullabies and children's songs. Songs of the supernatural (changelings, revenants, spirits) were also popular. Patriotic songs were rare. The poetic quality of the love songs in particular has been described as unusually high:

Ceo meala lá seaca ar choillte dubha daraí,
is grá gan cheilt atá agam dhuit, a bháinchnis na ngealchíoch,
do chom seang, do bhéal is do chúilín a bhí cas mín,
is a chéadsearc, ná tréig mé is gur mhéadaigh tú m'aicíd.

Translation:

A mist of honey on a frosty day over the dark oak woods - I love you without concealment, fair-skinned girl of the bright breasts, your slender waist, your mouth, your soft and curly hair; my first love, don't leave me, since it is you who worsened the pain of love.

The Great Famine, with its material and sociological consequences, had a considerable effect on Irish music. The number of Irish speakers declined because of death or emigration. There was a radical shift in land use, with tillage giving way to pasture, which was less labour-intensive. Songs to do with ploughing, reaping and sowing could no longer be sustained. There were, however, contemporary songs in Irish about the Famine itself, such as An Drochshaol (from West Cork), Amhrán na bPrátaí Dubha (from County Waterford), and Johnny Seoighe (from Conamara).

There was already an Irish tradition of songs in English. This included English songs, Lowland Scottish songs and ballads which were printed in England and sold in Ireland, such as Lord Baker, Captain Wedderburn’s Courtship and Barbara Allen, together with political ballads of Irish origin. After the Famine and with the loss of Irish speakers, such songs became dominant.

The interactive relationship between Irish and English is evident in the songs composed in English by Irish-speaking hedge school masters from the late 18th century on. These songs (some of which were parodies) often had a Latinate vocabulary. It has been said that they had a style "which, while capable of descending to the ridiculous, could also rise to the sublime". These songs and others often reproduced the metre and internal rhymes of songs in Irish:

Now to end my lamentation we are all in consternation
For want of education, I now must end my song,
Since without hesitation we are charged with combination
And sent for transportation from the hills of Mullaghbawn.

Antoine Ó Raifteirí (Anthony Raftery) (1784–1835) is a recognised Irish-language folk poet of the pre-Famine period. But the tradition of literate composition persisted. The Kerry poet Tomás Rua Ó Súilleabháin (1785–1848) was a schoolmaster, musician and dancing master; the Cork poet Mícheál Óg Ó Longáin (1766–1837) was a well-known copier of manuscripts.

Paradoxically, as soon as English became the dominant language of Irish poetry, the poets began to mine the Irish-language heritage as a source of themes and techniques. J. J. Callanan (1795–1829) was born in Cork and died at a young age in Lisbon. Unlike many other more visibly nationalist poets who would follow later, he knew Irish well, and several of his poems are loose versions of Irish originals. Although extremely close to Irish materials, he was also profoundly influenced by Byron and his peers; possibly his finest poem, the title work of The Recluse of Inchidony and Other Poems (1829), was written in Spenserian stanzas that were clearly inspired by Childe Harold's Pilgrimage.

The best-known Irish poet to draw upon Irish themes in the first half of the 19th century was probably Thomas Moore (1779–1852), although he had no knowledge of, and little respect for, the Irish language. He attended Trinity College Dublin at the same time as the revolutionary Robert Emmet, who was executed in 1803. Moore's most enduring work, Irish Melodies, was popular with English readers. They contain stereotyped images but helped in the development of a distinctive English-language poetic tradition in Ireland.

In 1842, Charles Gavan Duffy (1816–1903), Thomas Davis, (1814–1845), and John Blake Dillon (1816–1866) founded The Nation to agitate for reform of British rule. The group of politicians and writers associated with The Nation came to be known as the Young Irelanders. The magazine published verse, including work by Duffy and Davis, whose A Nation Once Again is still popular among Irish Nationalists. However, the most significant poet associated with The Nation was undoubtedly James Clarence Mangan (1803–1849). Mangan was a true poète maudit, who threw himself into the role of bard, and even included translations of bardic poems in his publications.

Another poet who supported the Young Irelanders, although not directly connected with them, was Samuel Ferguson (1810–1886). Ferguson once wrote that his ambition was "to raise the native elements of Irish history to a dignified level." To this end, he wrote many verse retellings of the Old Irish sagas. He also wrote a moving elegy to Thomas Davis. Ferguson, who believed that Ireland's political fate ultimately lay within the Union, brought a new scholarly exactitude to the study and translation of Irish texts.

William Allingham (1824–1889) was another important Unionist figure in Irish poetry. Born and bred in Ballyshannon, County Donegal, he spent most of his working life in England and was associated with the Pre-Raphaelite movement, and a close friend of Tennyson. His Day and Night Songs was illustrated by Dante Gabriel Rossetti and John Everett Millais. His most important work is the long poem, Laurence Bloomfield in Ireland (1864), a realist narrative which wittily and movingly deals with the land agitation in Ireland during the period. He was also known for his work as a collector of folk ballads in both Ireland and England.

Ferguson's research opened the way for many of the achievements of the Celtic Revival, especially those of W. B. Yeats (1865–1939) and Douglas Hyde (1860–1949), but this narrative of Irish poetry which leads to the Revival as culmination can also be deceptive and occlude important poetry, such as the work of James Henry (1798–1876), medical doctor, Virgil scholar and poet. His large body of work was completely overlooked until Christopher Ricks included him in two anthologies, and eventually edited a selection of his poetry.

=== The Celtic revival ===
Probably the most significant poetic movement of the second half of the 19th century was French Symbolism. This movement inevitably influenced Irish writers, not least Oscar Wilde (1845–1900). Although Wilde is best known for his plays, fiction, and The Ballad of Reading Gaol, he also wrote poetry in a symbolist vein and was the first Irish writer to experiment with prose poetry. However, the overtly cosmopolitan Wilde was not to have much influence on the future course of Irish writing. W. B. Yeats was much more influential in the long run. Yeats, too, was influenced by his French contemporaries but consciously focused on an identifiably Irish content. As such, he was partly responsible for the establishment of the literary movement known as the Celtic Revival. He won the Nobel Prize in Literature in 1923.

Apart from Yeats, much of the impetus for the Celtic Revival came from the work of scholarly translators who were aiding in the discovery of both the ancient sagas and Ossianic poetry and the more recent folk song tradition in Irish. One of the most significant of these was Douglas Hyde, later the first President of Ireland, whose Love Songs of Connacht was widely admired.

== The 20th century ==
=== Yeats and modernism ===
In the 1910s, Yeats became acquainted with the work of James Joyce, and worked closely with the American poet Ezra Pound, who served as his personal secretary for a time. Through Pound, Yeats also became familiar with the work of a range of prominent modernist poets. From his 1916 book Responsibilities and Other Poems onwards his work, while not entirely meriting the label modernist, became much more hard-edged than it had been.

Modernism, with its emphasis on technical and intellectual innovation, was to influence early 20th-century Irish poets writing both in English and Irish. Among them were those associated with the Easter Rising of 1916. Three of the Republican leadership, Pádraig Pearse (1879–1916) (who wrote in Irish), Joseph Mary Plunkett (1879–1916) and Thomas MacDonagh (1878–1916), were noted poets. Much of their verse is Catholic and Nationalistic in outlook, but their work is of considerable historical interest.

An individual from these groups is the Boyne Valley "peasant poet" Francis Ledwidge, who was pressured by the Irish Volunteers into enlisting in the British Army during World War I. After years of fighting as he believed for the rights of small nations like his own, Ledwidge was "blown to bits" by a German artillery shell during the Battle of Passchendaele in 1917.

However, it was to be Yeats' earlier Celtic mode that was to be most influential. Amongst the most prominent followers of the early Yeats were Pádraic Colum (1881–1972), F. R. Higgins (1896–1941), and Austin Clarke (1896–1974). In the 1950s, Clarke, returning to poetry after a long absence, turned to a much more personal style and wrote many satires on Irish society and religious practices. Irish poetic Modernism took its lead not from Yeats but from Joyce. The 1930s saw the emergence of a generation of writers who engaged in experimental writing as a matter of course. The best-known of these is Samuel Beckett (1906–1989), who won the Nobel Prize in Literature in 1969. Beckett's poetry, while not inconsiderable, is not what he is best known for. The most significant of the second generation of Modernist Irish poets who first published in the 1920s and 1930s include Brian Coffey (1905–1995), Denis Devlin (1908–1959), Thomas MacGreevy (1893–1967), Blanaid Salkeld (1880–1959), and Mary Devenport O'Neill (1879–1967). Coffey's two late long poems Advent (1975) and Death of Hektor (1982) are perhaps his most important works; the latter deals with the theme of nuclear apocalypse through motifs from Greek mythology.

It has been remarked that the work of Beckett, Devlin and MacGreevy displays the prime characteristics of the avant-garde: the problem of a disintegrating subjectivity; a lack of unity between the self and the society; and self-conscious literary pastiche.

It has been said that the notion of an "Irish modernism" is challenged by the number of Irish writers who did not fully engage with modernist experiments, an apathy noted by Irish, continental and Anglo-American critics. There were still key experimental writers in Ireland during the 1930s (Kate O’Brien, Elizabeth Bowen and others) whose work was marked by aesthetic self-consciousness and self-reflexiveness, but it could also be argued that much Irish writing was part of an international reaction against modernism.

While Yeats and his followers wrote about an essentially aristocratic Gaelic Ireland, the reality was that the actual Ireland of the 1930s and 1940s was a society of small farmers and shopkeepers. From this environment emerged poets who rebelled against the example of Yeats, but who were not Modernist by inclination. Patrick Kavanagh (1904–1967), who came from a small farm, wrote about the narrowness and frustrations of rural life. John Hewitt (1907–1987), whom many consider to be the founding father of poetry in Northern Ireland also came from a rural background but lived in Belfast and was amongst the first Irish poets to write of the sense of alienation that many at this time felt from both their original rural and new urban homes. Louis MacNeice (1907–1963), another poet from Northern Ireland, was associated with the left-wing politics of Michael Roberts's anthology New Signatures but was much less political a poet than W. H. Auden or Stephen Spender, for example. MacNeice's poetry was informed by his immediate interests and surroundings and is more social than political.

In the Republic of Ireland, a post-modernist generation of poets and writers emerged from the late 1950s onwards. Prominent among these writers were the poets Antony Cronin, Pearse Hutchinson, John Jordan, Thomas Kinsella and John Montague, most of whom were based in Dublin in the 1960s and 1970s. In Dublin a number of new literary magazines were founded in the 1960s: Poetry Ireland, Arena, The Lace Curtain, and in the 1970s, Cyphers.

=== The Northern School ===
With large Protestant minority and enduring political links to Great Britain, some believe that the culture of Northern Ireland differs from that on the rest of the island and this has had an effect on its literature.

In addition to John Hewitt, mentioned above, other important poets from Northern Ireland include Robert Greacen (1920–2008) who, with Valentin Iremonger, edited an important anthology, Contemporary Irish Poetry in 1949. Greacen was born in Derry, lived in Belfast in his youth and then in London during the 1950s, 1960s and 1970s. He won the Irish Times Prize for Poetry in 1995 for his Collected Poems, after he returned to live in Dublin when he was elected a member of Aosdana. Other poets of note from this time include Roy McFadden (1921–1999), a friend for many years of Greacen. Padraic Fiacc (born 1924), was born in Belfast, but lived in America during his youth. In the 1960s, and coincident with the rise of the Troubles in the province, a number of Ulster poets began to receive critical and public notice. Prominent amongst these were John Montague (born 1929), Michael Longley (born 1939), Derek Mahon (born 1941), Séamus Heaney (1939–2013) and Paul Muldoon (born 1951).

Heaney was probably the best-known of these poets. He won the Nobel Prize in Literature in 1995, and served as Boylston Professor of Rhetoric and Oratory and Emerson Poet in Residence at Harvard, and as Professor of Poetry at Oxford.

Derek Mahon was born in Belfast and worked as a journalist, editor, and screenwriter while publishing his first books. He published comparatively little.

Muldoon is Howard G. B. Clark '21 Professor in the Humanities at Princeton University. In 1999 he was also elected Professor of Poetry at the University of Oxford.

=== Experiment ===
In the late 1960s, two young Irish poets, Michael Smith (born 1942) and Trevor Joyce (born 1947) founded in Dublin the New Writers Press publishing house and a journal called The Lace Curtain. Initially this was to publish their own work and that of some like-minded friends (including Paul Durcan, Michael Hartnett and Gerry Smyth), and later to promote the work of neglected Irish modernists like Brian Coffey and Denis Devlin. Both Joyce and Smith have published considerable bodies of poetry in their own right.

Among the other poets published by the New Writers Press were Geoffrey Squires (born 1942), whose early work was influenced by Charles Olson, and Augustus Young (born 1943), who admired Pound and who has translated older Irish poetry, as well as work from Latin America and poems by Bertolt Brecht. Younger poets who write what might be called experimental poetry include Maurice Scully (born 1952), William Wall (born 1955) and Randolph Healy (born 1956). Many of these poets, along with younger experimentalists, have performed their work at the annual SoundEye Festival in Cork.

Some of the Irish poets develop the Surrealist trend in Irish poetry, notably Ciaran O'Driscoll (born 1943) and younger poets including John W. Sexton (born 1958), Medbh McGuckian, Tony Kitt and Tony Bailie. Their style has been described as "tangential Surrealism".

=== Outsiders ===
In addition to these two loose groupings, a number of prominent Irish poets of the second half of the 20th century could be described as outsiders, although these poets could also be considered leaders of a mainstream tradition in the Republic. These include Thomas Kinsella (born 1928), whose early work was influenced by Auden. Kinsella's later work exhibits the influence of Pound in its looser metrical structure and use of imagery but is deeply personal in manner and matter.

John Jordan (1930–1988) was an Irish poet born in Dublin on 8 April 1930. He was a celebrated literary critic from the late 1950s until his death in June 1988 in Cardiff, Wales, where he had participated in the Merriman Summer School. Jordan was also a short-story writer, literary editor, poet and broadcaster. His poetry collections include "Patrician Stations", "A Raft from Flotsam", "With Whom Did I Share the Crystal", "Collected Poems", and "Selected Poems".

Basil Payne (1923) was born in Dublin on June 23, 1923. His published work amounts to three slim volumes, and numerous inclusions in anthologies of Irish poetry.

Hugh McFadden (1942–) worked for many years as a newspaper journalist and book reviewer. His own collections of poems include Cities of Mirrors, Pieces of Time, Elegies & Epiphanies, and Empire of Shadows.

=== Women poets (in English) ===
The second half of the century also saw the emergence of a number of women poets including Eavan Boland (born 1944), Eiléan Ní Chuilleanáin (born 1942), Vona Groarke, Kerry Hardie, Kate Newmann, Medbh McGuckian, Paula Meehan, and Rita Ann Higgins. Boland has written widely on specifically feminist themes and on the difficulties faced by women poets in a male-dominated literary world. Ní Chuilleanáin's poetry shows her interest variously in explorations of the sacred, women's experience, and Reformation history. She has also translated poetry from a number of languages. Higgins is an unconventional poet whose work confronts social injustices.

== Contemporary poetry in Irish ==
During the Gaelic revival, a regular Irish-language column titled Ón dhomhan diar, generally about the hardships faced by immigrants to the United States, was contributed to Patrick Pearse's An Claidheamh Soluis by Pádraig Ó hÉigeartaigh (1871–1936). Ó hÉigeartaigh, an immigrant from Uíbh Ráthach, County Kerry, worked in the clothing business and lived with his family in Springfield, Massachusetts. Ó hÉigeartaigh also wrote poetry for the same publication in Munster Irish. His poem Ochón! a Dhonncha ("My Sorrow, Dhonncha!"), a lament for the drowning of his six-year-old son on 22 August 1905, appeared in Pearse's magazine in 1906. Although the early authors of the Gaelic revival preferred the literary language once common to the Bards of both Ireland and Scotland and felt only scorn for the oral poetry of the surviving Gaeltachtaí, Ó hÉigeartaigh drew upon that very tradition to express his grief and proved that it could still be used effectively by a 20th-century poet. Ó hÉigeartaigh's lament for his son has a permanent place in the literary canon of Irish poetry in the Irish language and has been translated into English by both Patrick Pearse and Thomas Kinsella.

Louis De Paor has alleged that the execution of Patrick Pearse by a British Army firing squad following the defeat of the Easter Rising of 1916, was a catastrophe for Irish literature in the Irish language. This is because Pearce's surviving poetry was radically innovative and shows the influences of Walt Whitman, Modernist poetry, and of the French Symbolists. It wouldn't be, according to De Paor, until the 1940s that Irish language poetry began to recover from the loss of Patrick Pearse.

One of the most talented 20th-century Irish-language poets and folklore collectors in the Irish diaspora was Seán Ó Súilleabháin (Sean "Irish" O'Sullivan) (1882–1957). Ó Súilleabháin, whom literary scholar Ciara Ryan has dubbed "Butte's Irish Bard", was born into a family of Irish-speaking fishermen upon Inishfarnard, a now-uninhabited island off the Beara Peninsula of County Cork. In 1905, Ó Súilleabháin sailed aboard the ocean liner Lucania from Queenstown to Ellis Island and settled in the heavily Irish-American mining community of Butte, Montana. Following his arrival, Ó Súilleabháin never returned to Ireland. In Montana, however, he learned for the first time to read and write in his native language, married, and raised a family. Ó Súilleabháin remained a very influential figure in Butte's Irish-American literary, cultural, and Irish republican circles for the rest of his life.

In the O'Sullivan Collection in the Butte-Silver Bow Archives, Ó Súilleabháin is also revealed to have been a highly talented poet who drew inspiration from poets such as Diarmuid Ó Sé, Máire Bhuidhe Ní Laoghaire, and Pádraig Phiarais Cúndún, who adapted the Jacobite tradition of Aisling poetry to more recent political struggles. For this reason, Ó Súilleabháin's surviving Aisling poems are inspired by the events of the Easter Rising and the Irish War of Independence; such as Cois na Tuinne, Bánta Mín Éirinn Glas Óg, and the highly popular 1919 poem Dáil Éireann. According to the poet's son, Fr. John Patrick Sarsfield O'Sullivan ("Fr. Sars"), his father recited Dáil Éireann aloud during Éamon de Valera's 1919 visit to Butte. The future Taoiseach of the Irish Republic was reportedly so impressed that he urged Ó Súilleabháin to submit the poem to Féile Craobh Uí Gramnaigh ("O'Growney's Irish Language Competition") in San Francisco. Ó Súilleabháin took de Valera's advice and won both first prize and the gold medal for the poem.

Seán Ó Súilleabháin's papers also include transcriptions of the verse of other local Irish-language poets. One prominent example is the poem Amhrán na Mianach ("The Song of the Mining"), which, "lays bare the hardships of a miner's life", was composed in Butte by Séamus Feiritéar (1897–1919), his brother Mícheál, and their childhood friend Seán Ruiséal. Other song transcribed in Ó Súilleabháin's papers was composed in 1910 by Séamus Ó Muircheartaigh, a Butte mine worker from Corca Dhuibhne, County Kerry, who was nicknamed An Spailpín ("The Farmhand"). The poem, which has eight stanzas and is titled, Beir mo Bheannacht leat, a Nellie ("Bring My Blessings with You, Nellie") was composed while Ó Muircheartaigh's wife, Nellie, and their son, Oisín, were on an extended visit to Ireland.

With the foundation of the Irish Free State in 1923, it became official government policy to promote and protect the Irish language. Despite its failures, this policy did further the revival in Irish-language literature which had started around 1900. In particular, the establishment in 1925 of An Gúm ("The Project"), a Government-sponsored publisher, created an outlet both for original works in Irish and for translations into the language.

The most important poet of the era between the death of Pearse and the literary revolution of the late 1940s was Liam Gógan (1891–1979). Gógan, a Dublin-born poet, lexicographer, and member of the Irish Civil Service, had, according to Louis De Paor, "a prodigious knowledge of all the spoken dialects of Irish and the Gaelic literary tradition."

After refusing to take an oath of allegiance to King George V following the Easter Rising of 1916, Gógan had been dismissed from his post in the National Museum of Ireland and imprisoned at Frongoch internment camp in Wales. Gógan had, according to De Paor, an encyclopedic knowledge of the Western canon, which found its way into his poetry. Gógan was also the first poet to write sonnets in the Irish language.

Unlike most other Irish language poets, who choose to compose in particular regional dialects, Gógan believed that a standard literary language, similar to those found in other European countries, needed to be developed. Gógan believed that the basis for the new standard Irish should be in older forms of the language and particularly in Old Irish and Classical Gaelic, the literary language once taught in the Bardic schools of both Ireland and the Scottish Highlands and Islands. As no one else has since embraced Gógan's theories about creating a standard literary form of Irish, David Wheatley has described Gógan's poetry, as "knotty", "undervalued", and sometimes extremely difficult to understand or to translate. While trying to translate Gógan into English, Wheatley has written that he often thought of Myles na gCopaleen's famous quip about the literary use of previously unknown Irish language terms, "I don't think those words are in Séadhna."

Colm Breathnach, who set out to re-popularise Gógan's poetry during the 2017 Imram literary festival, has said of Gógan, "He was a moderniser, he was trying to develop the language. He employed old words and forms, he coined new words (particularly compound words) from the existing resources of the language and mixed various dialectical usages throughout his work. Readers often found it difficult to follow these experiments... Some of his work would resonate with people today, he has a lot of love poetry, other works would portray urban angst, others are in a household setting."

Poetry in Irish saw a revolution beginning in the end of the 1940s with the poetry of Máirtín Ó Direáin (1910–1988), Seán Ó Ríordáin (1916–1977) and Máire Mhac an tSaoi (1922–2021). Their poetry, though retaining a sense of the tradition, continued the legacy of Pearse by introducing Modernist poetry into the Irish language.

According to Louis De Paor, "Máire Mhac an tSaoi spent two years studying in post-war Paris (1945-47) before joining the Irish diplomatic service, and was working at the Irish embassy in Madrid, during Franco's regime, when she committed herself to writing poetry in Irish following her discovery of the works of Federico Garcia Lorca. The tension between religious beliefs, contemporary social mores, and the more transgressive elements of female desire is central to the best of her work from the 1940s and early 50s. Both her deference to traditional patterns of language and verse and her refusal of traditional morality might be read as a reaction to the social, moral, and cultural upheaval of a world at war."

Also of that generation was Eoghan Ó Tuairisc (1919–1982), an Irish-language poet and novelist from Ballinasloe, County Galway who had served as a commissioned officer in the Irish Army during The Emergency.

Like Diarmaid Ó Súilleabháin, Ó Tuairisc and other writers of their generation, "challenged the critical orthodoxy by openly proclaiming that their standards could not be those of the Gaeltacht and by demanding a creative freedom that would acknowledge hybridity and reject the strictures of the linguistic purists."

In his 1964 poetry collection Lux aeterna, Ó Tuairisc included a long poem inspired by the Atomic bombings of Hiroshima and Nagasaki, entitled Aifreann na marbh ("Mass for the Dead"). The poem is an imitation of the Roman Catholic Requiem Mass, "with the significant omission of 'Credo' and 'Gloria.'"

According to Louis De Paor, "The poem also draws on early Irish literature to articulate Ó Tuairisc's idea that the poet has a responsibility to intercede in the eternal struggle between love and violence through the unifying, healing, power of creative imagination. While everyone is culpable in the annihilation of Hiroshima, the poet, the word-priest, bears a particular burden of responsibility."

Mac an Tsaoi, Ó Direáin, and Ó Tuairisc were the precursors of an even more radical group of poets, including Liam Ó Muirthile (1950–2018), Gabriel Rosenstock and Nuala Ní Dhomhnaill, whose poetry, first published in the 1970s and 1980s, reflected contemporary international influences. The poet and sean-nós singer Caitlín Maude (1941–1982) also belonged to that group. Other younger poets of note were Louis de Paor and Cathal Ó Searcaigh.

Other poets include Derry O'Sullivan, who, though long resident in Paris, has continued to publish in Irish. This is also true of Tomás Mac Síomóin, an Irish writer resident in Spain. Another published poet is Pádraig Mac Fhearghusa, for a long time the editor of Feasta.

Modern Irish-language poetry is notable for the growing number of women poets. They include Rita Kelly (widow of Eoghan Ó Tuairisc), Biddy Jenkinson (a nom de plume), Áine Ní Ghlinn and Bríd Ní Mhóráin, and younger writers such as Ciara Ní É, Doireann Ní Ghríofa and Ailbhe Ní Ghearbhuigh.

It has been argued that, since the Irish language depends for its continued existence on government patronage and the efforts of cultural activists, all poetry in the language is political to a certain extent: "It is an assertion of pride, an appeal for identity, a staking out of cultural territory".

Bilingualism has been a consistent feature of contemporary Irish poetic practice. Among the more notable examples was Michael Hartnett (1941–1999), who was fluent in both Irish and English. He won praise for his work in English, but in his 1975 book A Farewell to English he declared his intention to write only in Irish. A number of volumes in Irish followed but in 1989 he returned to English. Eoghan Ó Tuairisc, also bilingual, made no formal renunciation of either language but published in both in several genres.

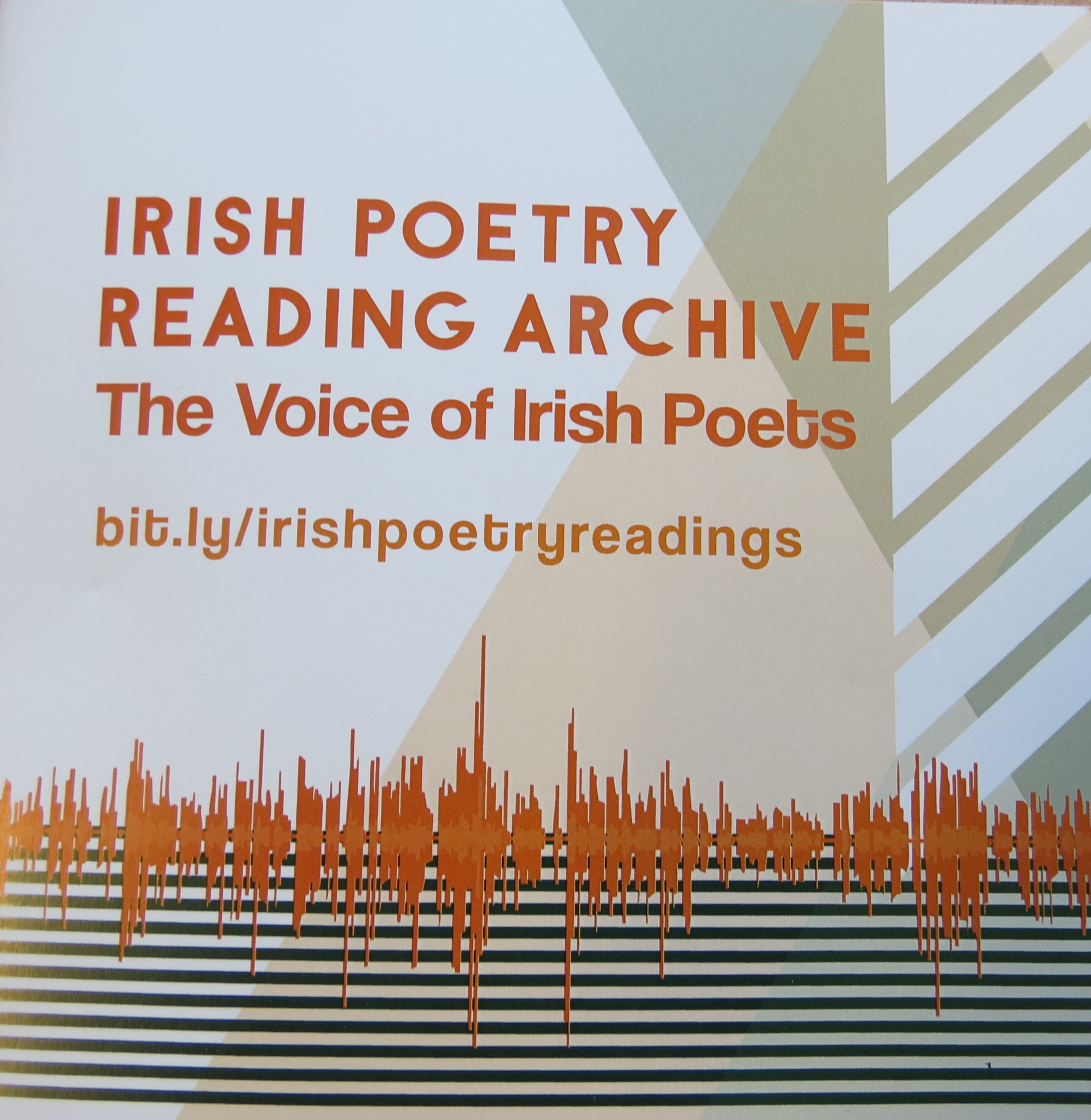
IPRA

In 2009, poet Muiris Sionóid published a complete translation of William Shakespeare's 154 sonnets into Connacht Irish under the title Rotha Mór an Ghrá ("The Great Wheel of Love").

In an article about his translations, Sionóid wrote that Irish poetic forms are completely different from those of other languages and that both the sonnet form and the iambic pentameter line had long been considered "entirely unsuitable" for composing poetry in Irish. In his translations, Soinóid chose to closely reproduce Shakespeare's rhyme scheme and rhythms while rendering into Irish.

In a copy that he gifted to the Shakespeare Birthplace Trust in Stratford Upon Avon, Sionóid wrote, "From Slaneyside to Avonside, from a land of bards to the greatest Bard of all; and long life and happiness to the guardians of the world’s most precious treasure."

In 2013, Leabhar Breac published Máire Mhac an tSaoi's literary translations of Rainer Maria Rilke's Duino Elegies from the original German into the Munster Irish traditionally spoken in Dun Chaoin, County Kerry.

== Irish Poetry Reading Archive ==
The newly created Irish Poetry Reading Archive (IPRA) is building into a comprehensive web-based library of Irish poets. Hosted by UCD’s Digital Library, a part of the university's James Joyce Library, it has an archive of contemporary Irish poets. These include established and emerging poets in both the English and Irish languages, experimental and emigrant poets, as well as performance poets. It contains videos of poets reading their work, as well hand-written copies of the recorded poems, signed copies of their collections, and a growing collection of poets' archives.

== See also ==
- Irish literature
- Literature of Northern Ireland

== Sources ==
- The Irish domain of poetryinternational.org A selection of many of the better contemporary practitioners
- Early poetry in Irish and English, ucc.ie.
- Swift, RPO.
- Cuirt an Mheán Oíche, showhouse.com.
- Goldsmith poems, RPO.
- More Goldsmith poems, theotherpages.org.
- Mangan, irishcultureandcustoms.com
- Moore, RPO.
- Ferguson, poetry-archive.com.
- Wilde, ucc.i.e.
- Plunkett, josephmaryplunkett.com
- SoundEye, soundeye.org.
- A checklist of New Writers' Press publications compiled by Trevor Joyce
- The Arts Council, artscouncil.ie.
- Poetry Ireland, poetryireland.ie.
- General biographical information, irishwriters-online.com.
