= Modernist poetry in English =

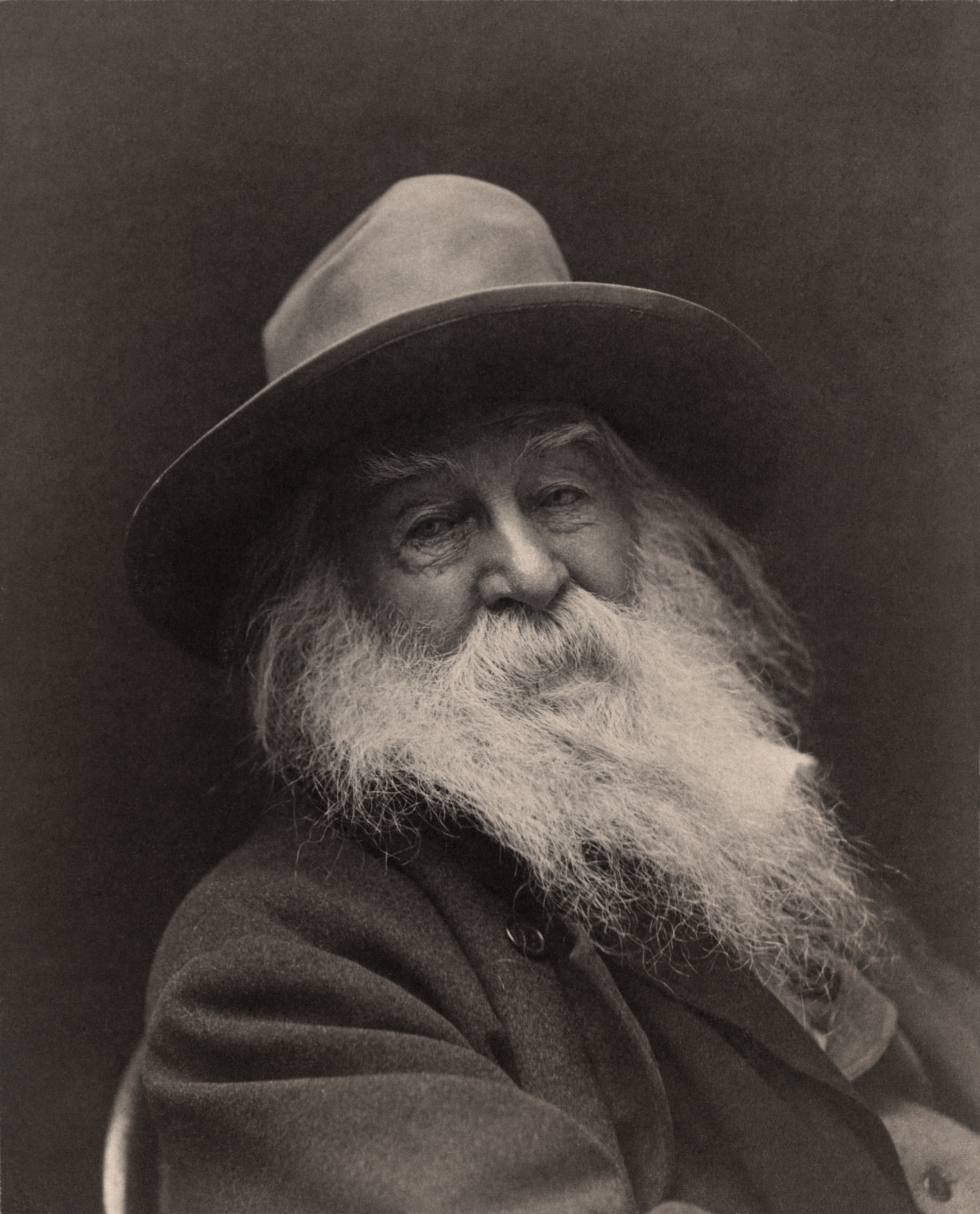
The American poet Walt Whitman (1819-1892), pre-dated the Modernist era but proved an inspiration to it

Modernist poetry in English started in the early years of the 20th century with the appearance of the Imagists. Like other modernists, Imagist poets wrote in reaction to the perceived excesses of Victorian poetry, and its emphasis on traditional formalism and ornate diction.

In Preface to the Lyrical Ballads, published in 1800, William Wordsworth criticized what he perceived to be the gauche and pompous nature of British poetry over a century earlier, and instead sought to bring poetry to the layman. Modernists saw themselves as looking back to the best practices of poets in earlier periods and other cultures. Their models included ancient Greek literature, Chinese and Japanese poetry, the troubadours, Dante and the medieval Italian philosophical poets, such as Guido Cavalcanti, and the English Metaphysical poets.

Much of early modernist poetry took the form of short, compact lyrics. Ultimately, however, longer poems gained in favor, representing the modernist movement of the 20th century.

== English-language modernism ==
A 1913 photograph of Ezra Pound, one of the most influential modernist poets

The roots of English-language poetic modernism can be traced back to the works of a number of earlier writers, including Walt Whitman, whose long lines approached a type of free verse, the prose poetry of Oscar Wilde, Robert Browning's subversion of the poetic self, Emily Dickinson's compression and the writings of the early English Symbolists, such as Arthur Symons. These poets largely remained true to the basic tenets of the Romantic movement and the appearance of the Imagists marked the first emergence of a distinctly modernist poetic in the language. Poetic sonic effects selected for verbal and aural felicity, not just images selected for their visual evocativeness also became an influential poetic device of modernism.

=== Imagism ===
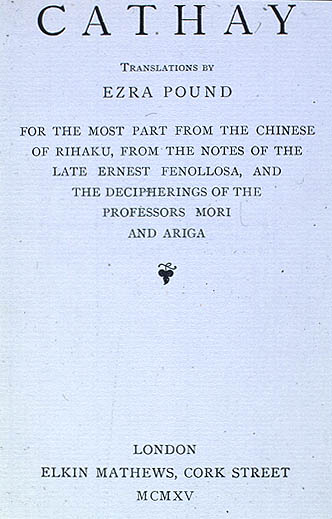
The title page to Cathay, published by Ezra Pound in 1915

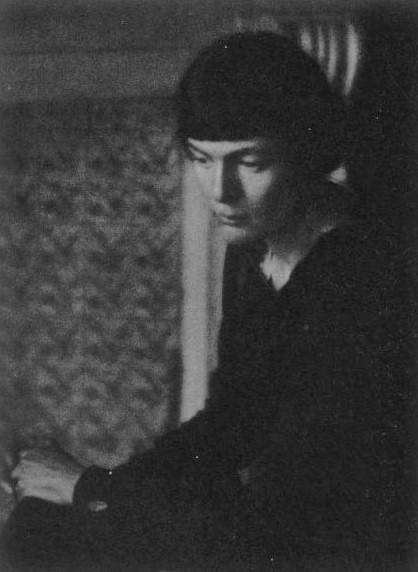
H.D. in 1917; in 1911, Ezra Pound cultivated her and Richard Aldington as major forces in the launch of the modernist poetry movement.

The origins of Imagism and cubist poetry are found in two poems by T. E. Hulme, published in 1909 by the Poets' Club in London. Hulme was a student of mathematics and philosophy who had established the Poets' Club to discuss his theories of poetry. The poet and critic F. S. Flint, who was a champion of free verse and modern French poetry, was highly critical of the club and its publications. From the ensuing debate, Hulme and Flint became close friends. They started meeting with other poets at the Eiffel Tower restaurant in Soho to discuss reform of contemporary poetry through free verse and the tanka and haiku and the removal of all unnecessary verbiage from poems.

The American poet Ezra Pound was introduced to this group and they found that their ideas resembled his.

In 1911, Pound introduced two other poets, H.D. and Richard Aldington, to the Eiffel Tower group. Both of these poets were students of the early Greek lyric poetry, especially the works of Sappho.

In October 1912, he submitted three poems each by H.D. and Aldington under the rubric Imagiste to Poetry magazine. That month Pound's book Ripostes was published with an appendix called The Complete Poetical Works of T. E. Hulme, which carried a note that saw the first appearance of the word Imagiste in print. Aldington's poems were in the November issue of Poetry and H.D.'s in January 1913 and Imagism as a movement was launched. The March issue contained Pound's A Few Don'ts by an Imagiste and Flint's Imagisme. The latter contained this succinct statement of the group's position:

1. Direct treatment of the "thing", whether subjective or objective.
2. To use absolutely no word that does not contribute to the presentation.
3. As regarding rhythm: to compose in sequence of the musical phrase, not in sequence of the metronome.
4. Complete freedom of subject matter.
5. Free verse was encouraged along with other new rhythms.
6. Common speech language was used, and the exact word was always to be used, as opposed to the almost exact word.

In setting these criteria for poetry, the Imagists saw themselves as looking backward to the best practices of pre-Romantic writing. Imagistic poets used sharp language and embraced imagery. Their work, however, was to have a revolutionary impact on English-language writing for the rest of the 20th century.

In 1913, Pound was contacted by the widow of the recently deceased Orientalist Ernest Fenollosa, who while in Japan had collected word-by-word translations and notes for 150 classical Chinese poems that fit in closely with this program. Chinese grammar offers different expressive possibilities from English grammar, a point that Pound later made. In Chinese, the first line of Li Po's, called "Rihaku" by Fenollosa's Japanese informants, poem "The River Merchant's Wife: A Letter," is a spare, direct juxtaposition of five characters that appear in Fenollosa's notes as

mistress hair first cover brow

In his resulting 1915 Cathay, Pound rendered this in simple English as

While my hair was still cut straight across my forehead

Between 1914 and 1917, four anthologies of Imagist poetry were published. In addition to Pound, Flint, H.D. and Aldington, these included work by Skipwith Cannell, Amy Lowell, William Carlos Williams, James Joyce, Ford Madox Ford, Allen Upward, John Cournos, D. H. Lawrence and Marianne Moore. With a few exceptions, this represents a roll-call of English-language modernist poets of the time. After the 1914 volume, Pound distanced himself from the group and the remaining anthologies appeared under the editorial control of Amy Lowell.

Lowell expressed her extreme debt to the French, to what she preferred to call "unrhymed cadence" instead of the more common "verse libre."

Henry Gore (1902–1956), whose work is undergoing something of a revival was also heavily influenced by the Imagist movement, although from a different generation from H.D., Flint, and others.

=== World War I and after ===
The outbreak of World War I represented a setback for the budding modernist movement for several reasons. First, writers like Aldington found themselves in active service; second, paper shortages and related factors meant that publication of new work became increasingly difficult; and, third, public sentiment in time of war meant that war poets such as Wilfred Owen, who wrote more conventional verse, became increasingly popular. One poet who served in the war, the visual artist David Jones, later resisted this trend in his long experimental war poem "In Parenthesis", which was written directly out of his trench experiences but was not published until 1937.

The war also tended to undermine the optimism of the Imagists. This was reflected in a number of major poems written in its aftermath. Pound's "Homage to Sextus Propertius" (1919) uses the loose translations and transformations of the Latin poet Propertius to ridicule war propaganda and the idea of empire. His Hugh Selwyn Mauberley, published in (1921, represents his farewell to Imagism and lyric poetry in general. The writing of these poems coincided with Pound's decision to abandon London permanently.

Sound poetry emerged in this period as a response to the war. For many Dadaists, including German writer Hugo Ball and New York poet and performer Baroness Elsa von Freytag-Loringhoven, sound poems were protestations against the sounds of war. As Irene Gammel and Suzanne Zelazo write, “Born as the trench warfare intensified, phonetic poetry was the language of trauma, a new language to counter the noise of the cannons”. The Baroness’s poem “Klink-Hratzvenga (Death-wail)”, written in response to her husband’s suicide after the war’s end, was “a mourning song in nonsense sounds that transcended national boundaries”. Working from a confrontational feminist and artistic agenda, the Baroness asserted a distinctly female subjectivity in the post-World War I era.

The most famous English-language modernist work arising out of this post-war disillusionment is T. S. Eliot's epic "The Waste Land" (1922). Eliot was an American poet who had been living in London for some time. Although he was never formally associated with the Imagist group, his work was admired by Pound, who, in 1915, helped him publish "The Love Song of J. Alfred Prufrock", which brought him to prominence. When Eliot had completed his original draft of a long poem based on both the disintegration of his personal life and mental stability, and the culture around him, he gave the manuscript, provisionally titled "He Do the Police in Different Voices", to Pound for comment. After some heavy editing, "The Waste Land" in the form in which we now know it was published, and Eliot came to be seen as the voice of a generation. The addition of notes to the published poem served to highlight the use of collage as a literary technique, paralleling similar practice by the cubists and other visual artists. From this point on, modernism in English tended towards a poetry of the fragment that rejected the idea that the poet could present a comfortingly coherent view of life.

T. S. Eliot's "The Waste Land" is a foundational text of modernism, representing the moment at which Imagism moves into modernism proper. Broken, fragmented and seemingly unrelated slices of imagery come together to form a disjunctive anti-narrative. The motif of sight and vision is as central to the poem as it is to modernism; the omni-present character Tiresias acting as a unifying theme. The reader is thrown into confusion, unable to see anything but a heap of broken images. The narrator, however (in "The Waste Land" as in other texts), promises to show the reader a different meaning; that is, how to make meaning from dislocation and fragmentation. This construction of an exclusive meaning is essential to modernism.

=== Others and others and brother and mothers ===
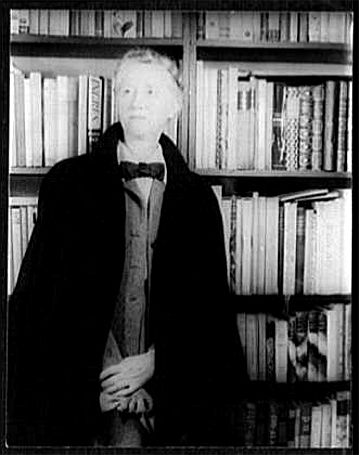
Marianne Moore, photographed by Carl Van Vechten in 1948, wrote in syllabic verse and sometimes utilized stanza in her poems.

Although London and Paris were key centres of activity for English-language modernists, much important activity took place elsewhere, including early publication in Poetry magazine in the United States. When Mina Loy moved to New York in 1916, she became part of a circle of writers involved with Others: A Magazine of the New Verse which included William Carlos Williams and Marianne Moore, among others. This magazine, which ran from 1915 to 1919, was edited by Alfred Kreymborg. Contributors also included Pound, Eliot, H.D., Djuna Barnes, Amy Lowell, Conrad Aiken, Carl Sandburg, and Wallace Stevens.

The U.S. modernist poets were concerned to create work in a distinctively American idiom. Williams, a doctor who worked in general practice in a working-class area of Rutherford, New Jersey, explained this approach by saying that he made his poems from 'the speech of Polish mothers'. In this, they were placing themselves in a tradition stretching back to Whitman.

After her initial association with the Imagists, Marianne Moore carved out a niche for herself among 20th-century poets. Much of her poetry is written in syllabic verse, repeating the number of syllables rather than stresses or beats, per line. She also experimented with stanza forms borrowed from troubadour poetry.

Wallace Stevens' work falls somewhat outside this mainstream of modernism. Indeed, he deprecated the work of both Eliot and Pound as "mannered." His poetry is a complex exploration of the relationship between imagination and reality. Unlike many other modernists, but like the English Romantics, by whom he was influenced, Stevens thought that poetry was what all humans did; the poet was merely self-conscious about the activity.

In Scotland, the poet Hugh MacDiarmid formed something of a one-man modernist movement. An admirer of Joyce and Pound, MacDiarmid wrote much of his early poetry in anglicised Lowland Scots, a literary dialect which had also been used by Robert Burns. He served in the Royal Army Medical Corps during World War I and was invalided out in 1918. After the war, he set up a literary magazine, Scottish Chapbook, with 'Not traditions - Precedents!' as its motto. His later work reflected an increasing interest in found poetry and other formal innovations.

In Canada, the Montreal Group of modernist poets, including A.M. Klein, A.J.M. Smith, and F.R. Scott, formed at that city's McGill University in the mid-1920s. Though the poets of the group made little headway for the next twenty years, they were ultimately successful in establishing a modernist hegemony and canon in that country that would endure until at least the end of the 20th century.

=== Wallace Stevens' Of Modern Poetry ===
Wallace Stevens' essential modernist poem, "Of Modern Poetry"(1942) sounds as if the verbs are left out. The verb 'to be' is omitted from the first and final lines. The poem itself opens and closes with the act of finding. The poem and the mind become synonymous: a collapse between the poem, the act, and the mind. In the poem, the dyad becomes further collapsed into one: a spatial and a temporal collapse between the subject and the object; form and content equal each other; form becomes not simply expressive of, but constitutive of. The poem goes from being a static object to being an action. The poem of the mind has to be alternative and listening; it is experimental. The poem resists and refuses transcendentalism, but remains within the conceptual limits of the mind and the poem.

== Maturity ==
With the publication of The Waste Land, modernist poetry appeared to have made a breakthrough into wider critical discourse and a broader readership. However, the economic collapse of the late 1920s and early 1930s had a serious negative impact on the new writing. For American writers, living in Europe became more difficult as their incomes lost a great deal of their relative value. Gertrude Stein, Barney, and Joyce remained Paris, where much of the scene they had presided over began to scatter. Pound left for Italy. Eliot left for London. H.D. moved between London and Switzerland, and many of the other writers associated with the movement were then living in the United States.

The economic depression, combined with the impact of the Spanish Civil War, also saw the emergence, in the Britain of the 1930s, of a more overtly political poetry, as represented by such writers as W. H. Auden and Stephen Spender. Although nominally admirers of Eliot, these poets tended towards a poetry of radical content but formal conservativeness. For example, they rarely wrote free verse, preferring rhyme and regular stanza patterns in much of their work.

=== 1930s modernism ===
Modernism in English remained in the role of an avant garde movement, depending on little presses and magazines and a small but dedicated readership. The key group to emerge during this time were the Objectivist poets, consisting of Louis Zukofsky, George Oppen, Charles Reznikoff, Carl Rakosi, Basil Bunting and Lorine Niedecker. The Objectivists were admirers of Stein, Pound and Williams and Pound actively promoted their work. Thanks to his influence, Zukofsky was asked to edit a special Objectivist issue of the Chicago-based journal Poetry in 1931 to launch the group. The basic tenets of Objectivist poetics were to treat the poem as an object and to emphasise sincerity, intelligence, and the poet's ability to look clearly at the world, and in this they can be viewed as direct descendants of the Imagists. Continuing a tradition established in Paris, Zukofsky, Reznikoff, and Oppen went on to form the Objectivist Press to publish books by themselves and by Williams. In his later work, Zukofsky developed his view of the poem as object to include experimenting with mathematical models for creating poems, producing effects similar to the creation of a Bach fugue or a piece of serial music.

A number of Irish poets and writers moved to Paris in the early 1930s to join the circle around James Joyce. These included Samuel Beckett, Thomas MacGreevy, Brian Coffey and Denis Devlin. These writers were aware of Pound and Eliot, but they were also Francophone and took an interest in contemporary French poetry, especially the surrealists. Indeed, Coffey and Devlin were amongst the first to translate the works of Paul Éluard into English. Around the same time, a number of British surrealist poets were beginning to emerge, among them David Gascoyne, George Barker and Hugh Sykes Davies. Like the Objectivists, these poets were relatively neglected by their native literary cultures and had to wait for a revival of interest in British and Irish modernism in the 1960s before their contributions to the development of this alternative tradition were properly assessed.

=== Long poems ===
Pound's Homage to Sextus Propertius and Hugh Selwyn Mauberley and Eliot's The Waste Land marked a transition from the short imagistic poems that were typical of earlier modernist writing towards the writing of longer poems or poem-sequences. A number of long poems were also written during the 1920s, including Mina Loy's 'auto-mythology', Anglo-Mongrels and the Rose and Hugh MacDiarmid's satire on Scottish society, A Drunk Man Looks At The Thistle. MacDiarmid wrote a number of long poems, including On a Raised Beach, Three Hymns to Lenin and In Memoriam James Joyce, in which he incorporated materials from science, linguistics, history and even found poems based on texts from the Times Literary Supplement. David Jones' war poem In Parenthesis was a book-length work that drew on the matter of Britain to illuminate his experiences in the trenches, and his later epic The Anathemata, itself hewn from a much longer manuscript, is a meditation on empire and resistance, the local and the global, which uses materials from Christian, Roman and Celtic history and mythology.

One of the most influential of all the modernist long poems was Pound's The Cantos, a 'poem containing history' that he started in 1915 and continued to work on for the rest of his writing life. From a starting point that combines Homer's Odyssey and Dante's Divine Comedy to create a personal epic of 20th-century life, the poem uses materials from history, politics, literature, art, music, economics, philosophy, mythology, ecology and the poet's personal experiences and ranges across European, American, African and Asian cultures. Pound coined the term 'ideogrammatic method' to describe his technique of placing these materials in relation to each other so as to open up new and unexpected relationships. This can be seen as paralleling techniques used by modernist artists and composers to similar ends.

Other Imagist-associated poets also went on to write long poems. William Carlos Williams' Paterson applied the techniques developed by Pound to a specific location and in a specific, American, dialect. H.D. wrote Trilogy out of her experiences in London during World War II and Helen in Egypt, a reworking of the Helen of Troy story from the perspective of the female protagonist, as a kind of feminist response to the masculine mind-set behind Pound's epic. Eliot's experiences of war-torn London also underpinned his Four Quartets. A number of Objectivists also wrote long poems, including Zukofsky's "A", Charles Reznikoff's Testimony, and Basil Bunting's Briggflatts. Brian Coffey's Advent is the key long poem by an Irish modernist. All these poems, to one extent or another, use a range of techniques to blend personal experience with materials from a wide range of cultural and intellectual activities to create collage-like texts on an epic scale.

A long poem that is often overlooked, because it first appeared in the commercially unsuccessful 1936 anthology New Provinces, is Canadian poet A. M. Klein's meditation on Spinoza, "Out of the Pulver and the Polished Lens".

== Politics ==
Poetic modernism was an overtly revolutionary literary movement, a revolution of the word, and, for a number of its practitioners, this interest in radical change spilled over into politics. A number of the leading early modernists became known for their right-wing views; these included Eliot, who once described himself as a Royalist, Stein, who supported the Vichy government for a time at least, and, most notoriously, Pound, who, after moving to Italy in the early 1930s, openly admired Benito Mussolini and began to include anti-Semitic sentiments in his writings. He was arrested towards the end of World War II on charges of treason arising out of broadcasts he made on Italian radio during the war but never faced trial because of his mental health.

A number of leading modernists took a more left-wing political view. Hugh MacDiarmid helped found the National Party of Scotland and was also a member of the Communist Party of Great Britain. During the 1930s, he was expelled from National Party of Scotland for being a communist and from the Communist Party for being a nationalist, although he later rejoined the Communist Party in 1956. The Objectivists Louis Zukofsky, George Oppen and Carl Rakosi were all, at one time or another, committed Marxists and Oppen spent a number of years in Mexico to escape the attention of Joseph McCarthy's United States Senate committee. A number of the British surrealists, especially David Gascoyne, also supported communism.

Other modernists took up political positions that did not fit neatly into the traditional left vs. right model. H.D., Mina Loy, and Nathalie Barney, for instance, are now seen as proto-feminists and their openness about their various sexualities can be read as foreshadowing the 1970s view that the personal is political. H.D., especially after World War I, came to view the goal of modernism as being the bringing about of world peace. However, she also displayed anti-Semitic views in the notebooks for her book Tribute to Freud. Basil Bunting, who came from a Quaker background, was a conscientious objector during World War I, but because of his opposition to Fascism, served in British Military Intelligence in Persia (Iran) during World War II. William Carlos Williams' political views arose from his daily contact with the poor who attended his surgery. He was another for whom the personal and political blended, an approach best summed up in his statement that 'A new world is only a new mind'.

Although many modernist poets were politically engaged, there is no single political position that can be said to be closely allied to the modernist movement in English-language poetry. These poets came from a wide range of backgrounds and had a wide range of personal experiences and their political stances reflect these facts.

== Legacy ==
The modernist revolution of the word was not universally welcomed by readers or writers. By the 1930s, a new generation of poets had emerged who looked to more formally conservative poets like Thomas Hardy and W. B. Yeats as models, and these writers struck a chord with a readership who were uncomfortable with the experimentation and uncertainty preferred by the modernists. Notwithstanding, modernist poetry cannot be positively characterised, there being no mainstream or dominant mode.

However, the 1950s saw the emergence, particularly in the United States, of a new generation of poets who looked to the modernists for inspiration. The influence of modernism can be seen in these poetic groups and movements, especially those associated with the San Francisco Renaissance, the Beat Generation, the Black Mountain poets, and the deep image group. Charles Olson, the theorist of the Black Mountain group, wrote in his 1950 essay, Projectivist Verse 'ONE PERCEPTION MUST IMMEDIATELY AND DIRECTLY LEAD TO A FURTHER PERCEPTION', a statement that links back directly to the Imagists. Robert Duncan, another Black Mountain poet admired H.D. while a third member of the group, Robert Creeley did much to help revive interest in Zukofsky and other Objectivists.

Among the Beats, Gary Snyder and Allen Ginsberg studied Pound closely and were heavily influenced by his interest in Chinese and Japanese poetry and the ecological concerns evident in the later Cantos. William Carlos Williams was another who had a strong impact on the Beat poets, encouraging poets like Lew Welch and writing an introduction for the book publication of Ginsberg's seminal poem, Howl. Many of these writers found a major platform for their work in Cid Corman's Origin magazine and press. Origin also published work by Louis Zukofsky, Lorine Niedecker and Wallace Stevens, helping to revive interest in these early modernist writers. The Objectivists, especially the strict formal experimentation of Zukofsky's later works, were also formative for the L=A=N=G=U=A=G=E poets.

As the Beats and other American poets began to find readers in the UK and Ireland, a new generation of British poets with an interest in modernist experimentation began to appear. These poets, who included Tom Raworth, Bob Cobbing, Gael Turnbull, Tom Pickard and others formed the nucleus of the British Poetry Revival. This new generation helped bring about a renewed interest in the writings of Bunting, MacDiarmid, David Jones and David Gascoyne. Current practice includes the enormously influential canon of Roy Fisher (also a major player in the Revival).

Contemporary poets associated with Irish modernism include those associated with New Writers Press and The Beau magazine; these include Trevor Joyce, Michael Smith, Geoffrey Squires, Randolph Healy, Billy Mills, Catherine Walsh, and Maurice Scully. New Writers Press also published work by Thomas MacGreevy, Brian Coffey and Denis Devlin, introducing them to a new audience, and, in Coffey's case, facilitating a late flowering of new work.

== See also ==
- Free verse
- Modernism
- Modernist poetry
- Post-modernism
- Scottish Renaissance
- Vers libre
