= The Lace Curtain =

Literary magazine

The Lace Curtain was an occasional literary magazine founded and edited by Michael Smith and Trevor Joyce under their New Writers Press imprint. Both press and journal were dedicated to expanding the horizons of Irish poetry by rediscovering a native modernist tradition, publishing younger Irish poets who were working in modes that sat outside the mainstream and introducing innovative non-Irish writing to an Irish audience.

The journal ran to six issues spanning the period 1969–1978. Contributors included Anthony Cronin, Eiléan Ní Chuilleanáin, Michael Hartnett, Augustus Young, John Montague, Antonio Machado, Paul Durcan, Desmond O'Grady, Brian Coffey Denis Devlin, Georg Trakl, Samuel Beckett, Thomas MacGreevy, Thomas Kinsella, Derek Mahon, Austin Clarke and Pablo Neruda.

Ní Chuilleanáin co-founded Cyphers, which first appeared as The Lace Curtain's penultimate edition was published.
