= Gerard Smyth =

Irish poet (born 1951)

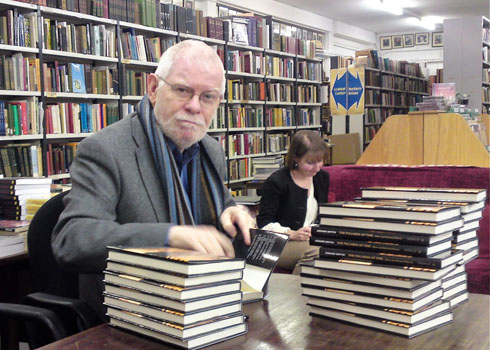
Signing at Kennys Bookshop

Gerard Smyth (born 1951) is an Irish poet, born in Dublin, Ireland, in 1951. He began publishing poetry in the late 1960s when his first poems were published by David Marcus in the New Irish Writing Page of The Irish Press and by James Simmons in The Honest Ulsterman.

New Writers' Press published a limited edition small collection, The Flags Are Quiet, in 1969 and another limited, hand-printed edition, Twenty Poems in 1971, followed by Orchestra of Silence, a Tara Telephone publication, also in 1971. This early work – highly influenced by his reading of Dylan Thomas and Hopkins – also appeared in the Press's journal The Lace Curtain.

Smyth was born and grew up in the old Liberties heartland of the city, which has influenced, and features in, much of the poetry he has written. It is the factor in his work that prompted the poet Michael Hartnett to say “Gerard Smyth is essentially a city-poet; lyrical, passionate, he may do for Dublin in verse what Joyce did for it in prose”. When he was presented with the O'Shaughnessy Poetry Award from the University of St Thomas in St Paul, Minnesota, in 2012, the citation remarked that he was “ inescapably a poet of the inward city. His city is one in which every day comes as news: a city of endless stories, of streets and neighbourhoods rich with associations, and a city of early memories. He gives us a city of found objects and found connections…”

The poet Martyn Dyar, in his introduction to a reading by Smyth at Limerick University in May 2019, also noted the strong urban themes in the work: "We move in Gerard Smyth’s books through layered zones of experience, memory, legend and culture, between his connected homeplaces and family workplaces … In that half a dozen acres or so of old Dublin, just beyond the few remaining pieces of the pale of the old administrative centre, Smyth has staged fifty years of imaginative journeys, ventriloquizing along the way for people who might have been resigned to oblivion."

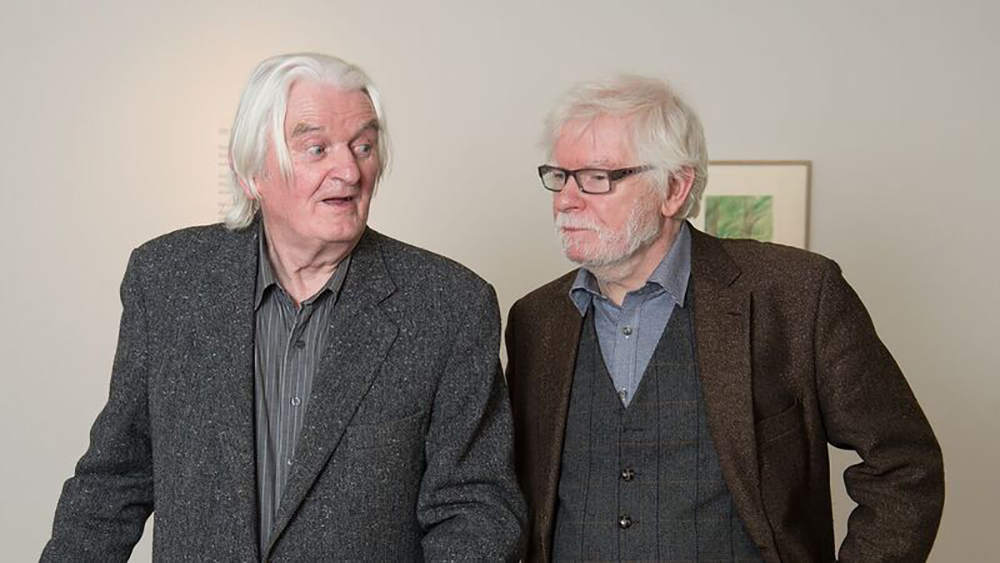
Smyth and Sean McSweeney at the launch of The Yellow River at the Solstice Arts Centre, Navan (which commissioned the work), in 2017

In contrast to the urbanscape of his city poems, the other significant topographical location in his work is the landscape of the rural area of County Meath where he spent the summers of his childhood and teen years on the small farm on which his mother was born – and where he wrote his first poems at the age of sixteen. He has, up to the present time, maintained close contact with this ancestral ground of his maternal family's past.

Fifty years after writing his first poems in the setting of his Meath grandmother’s farm, he returned to explore the area and his memories of it. The result was a book of poems and paintings titled The Yellow River, a collaborative project with the artist Sean McSweeney, commissioned by the Solstice Arts Centre based in the county;s town of Navan. The artist’s father came from the same Meath locality as the poet’s mother. Poet and essayist Gerald Dawe remarked that “ this interweaving of imaginative traffic has produced a book of fascinating contrasts between poet and artist; a sense of the continuing arresting attraction of a once familiar and known landscape redrawn and reinhabited.”

Smyth has worked all his professional life as a journalist with The Irish Times, first as a newsman and later as managing editor with responsibility for arts coverage. He was the newspaper's poetry critic for several years in the late 1970s. He is currently the newspaper's poetry editor, choosing the weekly poem, a tradition The Irish Times has maintained for over 100 years.

He was elected a member of Aosdána (Ireland’s affiliation of writers and artists) in May 2009. In 2011 he received the O’Shaughnessy Poetry Award from University of St Thomas in St Paul, Minnesota. He is co-editor, with Pat Boran, of “If Ever You Go: A Map of Dublin in Poetry and Song” (Dedalus Press), published and chosen as Dublin's One City, One Book for 2014.

He has participated in readings in Moscow, St Petersburg, Paris, Berlin, Stuttgart, Bucharest, St Paul, Minneapolis, and London as well as at most of Ireland's literary festivals including Cuirt, the Kilkenny Festival, Dublin International Writers’ Festival and Electric Picnic.

His poem Isolation, written early in Ireland's COVID-19 pandemic lockdown and published on the front page of The Irish Times on March 21, 2020, was adapted for a Zoom choral performance by composer Philip Lawton and given a digital performance in Berlin on June 17.

A poet of the mundane and the mysterious, a poet of the everyday and also of the eternal. – Dennis O’Driscoll

"Smyth is a fine lyric poet...close to home in image and event." – Augustus Young, The Niagara Magazine (New York)

Smyth is a poet of uncommon and unnecessary humility; he holds his poems within strict limits, allowing them little occasion for grandeur or posture. Despite his scrupulous restraint in form, the phrasing frequently manifests a romantic richness which is in turn checked by the impersonality of voice sustained throughout all of these poems. – W J McCormack.

== Collections ==
- The Flags Are Quiet, New Writers’ Press, 1969.
- Twenty Poems, New Writers’ Press, 1970.
- Orchestra of Silence, Gallery Press, 1971.
- World Without End, New Writers Press, 1977.
- Loss and Gain, Raven Arts Press, 1981.
- Painting the Pink Roses Black, Dedalus Press, 1986.
- Daytime Sleeper, Dedalus Press, 2002.
- A New Tenancy, Dedalus Press, 2004.
- The Mirror Tent, Dedalus Press, 2007.
- After Easter, limited edition by The Salvage Press, 2014.
- The Fullness of Time: New and Selected Poems, Dedalus Press, 2010.
- We Like it Here Beside the River, Hand-printed limited edition by The Salvage Press, 2014.
- A Song of Elsewhere, Dedalus Press, 2014, Solstice Arts Centre, 2017.
- The Yellow River, Solstice Arts Centre, 2017.
- The Sundays of Eternity, Dedalus Press, 2020 .

He has contributed widely to literary magazines in Ireland, Britain and North America and has been translated into Spanish, Polish, Hungarian and Romanian. He has read his work on RTE Radio and is represented in several anthologies, including Windharp: Poems of Ireland Since 1916 (edited by Niall MacMonagle ); All Through the Night: Night Poems and Lullabies (edited by Marie Heaney); Visiting Bob: Poems Inspired by the Life and Work of Bob Dylan (edited by Thom Tammaro and Alan Davis); Accompanied Voices (edited by John Greening), and Dubliners (edited by Brendan Kennelly and Katie Donovan).
