= Brian Coffey =

Irish poet and publisher

Brian Coffey (8 June 1905 – 14 April 1995) was an Irish poet and publisher. His work was informed by his Catholicism, his background in science and philosophy, and his connection to French surrealism. He was close to an intellectual European Catholic tradition and mainstream Irish Catholic culture. Two of his long poems, Advent (1975) and Death of Hektor (1979), were widely considered to be important works in the canon of Irish poetic modernism. He also ran Advent Books, a small press, during the 1960s and 1970s.

== Early life and work ==
Coffey was born in Dublin in the suburb of Dún Laoghaire. He attended the Mount St Benedict boarding school in Gorey, County Wexford from 1917 to 1919 and then James Joyce's old school, Clongowes Wood College, in Clane, County Kildare, from 1919 until 1922. In 1923, he went to France to study for a Bachelor's degree in Classical Studies at the Institution St Vincent, Senlis, Oise.

His father, Denis J. Coffey, was a professor of anatomy at the Catholic University of Ireland Medical School in Cecilia Street, who served as the first president following the creation of the National University of Ireland of University College Dublin (UCD) from 1908 to 1940. Coffey entered UCD in 1924 and was awarded BSc (1929) and MSc (1930) in mathematical science. He also represented the college in boxing tournaments.

While still at college, Coffey began writing poetry. He published his first poems in UCD's The National Student under the pseudonym Coeuvre. These poems, which have never been collected, showed the influence of French Symbolism and of TS Eliot. During this time Coffey met Denis Devlin and together they published a volume entitled Poems in 1930. Coffey and Devlin both also participated in college dramatics, taking roles in French plays.

== Paris ==
In the early 1930s, Coffey moved to Paris, where he studied Physical Chemistry under Jean Baptiste Perrin, who had won the Nobel Prize for Physics in 1926. He completed these studies in 1933, and his Three Poems was printed in Paris by Jeanette Monnier that same year, as was the poem card Yuki Hira, which was admired by George William Russell and William Butler Yeats. He also became friendly with other Irish writers based in the city, including Thomas MacGreevy and Samuel Beckett. In his 1934 essay Recent Irish Poetry, Beckett picked out Coffey and Devlin as forming 'the nucleus of a living poetic in Ireland'.

He entered the Institut Catholique de Paris that year to work with the noted French philosopher Jacques Maritain, taking his licentiate examination in 1936. He then moved to London for a time and contributed reviews and a poem to Eliot's Criterion magazine. On trips home to Dublin, he contributed to programmes on literary topics on RTÉ radio and published poems in Ireland Today.

He returned to Paris in 1937 as an exchange student to work on his doctoral thesis on the idea of order in the work of Thomas Aquinas. In 1938, Coffey's second volume of poetry, Third Person, was published by George Reavey's Europa Press. He also contributed translations to the same publisher's Thorns of Thunder (1936), the first collection of Paul Éluard's work published in English. The poems of this period saw Coffey shake off his earlier influences and begin to find his own voice but, for a variety of reasons, Third Person was to be his last poetry publication for a quarter of a century.

== St Louis ==
During the war, Coffey taught in schools in London and Yorkshire, leaving his young family in Dublin. After the war, he returned to Paris and completed his doctoral thesis. The family then moved so Coffey could take up a teaching post at the Jesuit Saint Louis University. During this period, Coffey seems to have done very little, if any, creative writing as he focused mainly on philosophical work based on his thesis, publishing a number of essays in The Modern Schoolman.

By the early 1950s, Coffey had become uncomfortable for a number of reasons, including the nature of his work, his distance from Ireland and the pressures that inevitably came to bear on an academic who had previously associated with well-known left-wing writers in Paris. For these reasons, he began to look for a suitable opportunity to leave the United States and resigned, possibly on a matter of academic principle, in 1952.

== Later life and work ==
In 1952, Coffey returned to live in London and, from 1973, Southampton. He began again to publish his poetry and translations, mainly of French poetry. The first work in English to appear after this period of silence was Missouri Sequence, apparently begun in St. Louis but first appearing in the University Review in 1962. This poem deals with the experience of exile, memories of the poet's dead parents and the premature birth of a child. It is written in a much more conventional syntax than most of Coffey's work and, thanks to this greater accessibility, is one of his most widely read works.

Poems and Versions 1929–1990, Coffey's last major publication.

Over the next decade or so, he published regularly in the University Review (later known as the Irish University Review), a relationship that culminated in the 1975 special issue. This featured an introduction by Dr JCC Mays, a selection of translations from French, the satire Leo and Advent, a meditation on death inspired by the death of the poet's son in a motorcycle accident. The poem is in seven sections, based, according to Coffey, in an interview with Parkman Howe on the canonical hours of the Catholic Church.

Another key work of this period was Death of Hektor, which uses the myth of Troy as a framework for a meditation on war and its victims. The trade editions of Advent and Death of Hektor were both published by the Menard Press. He also edited Devlin's Collected Poems (1964), first for a University Review Devlin special issue and later as a book from Dolmen Press.

He also set up his own publishing enterprise, Advent Books, which published work by himself and by younger writers he wanted to support. He learned printmaking and produced a good deal of original work, including an interesting set of images based on the plays of his old friend Beckett. His interest in visual art also led to some experiments in concrete poetry, most notably his 1966 Advent book Monster: A Concrete Poem. His work was championed by a number of younger Irish poets, especially Michael Smith and Trevor Joyce. These two published poetry, prose and translations by Coffey in their journal The Lace Curtain, and his Selected Poems (1971), under their New Writers Press imprint. This book was instrumental in helping establish his reputation as a leading Irish exponent of modernist poetry.

The appearance in 1991 of a major selection Poems and Versions 1929–1990 and his translations Poems from Mallarmé helped confirm his status as one of the leading Irish modernists. He died at the age of 89 and was buried in Southampton, England.

== Bibliography ==
Poetry

- Poems (1930), (with Denis Devlin)
- Three Poems (1933)
- Third Person (1938)
- Dice Thrown Never Will Annul Chance (1965). (trans. of Mallarmé's Coup de Dés)
- Monster: A Concrete Poem (1966) John Parsons taught Brian printmaking, as lecturer in printmaking at St Martins School of Art. He also designed, printed and constructed the poem Monster, as he also did on many of the Advent Books. Brian and John were good friends.
- Selected Poems (1971),
- Advent in Irish University Review, Vol. 5., No. 1 (Spring 1975)
- The Big Laugh (1976)
- Death of Hektor (1979), ill. S. W. Hayter
- Topos and Other Poems (Bath: Mammon Press 1981)
- Death of Hektor: Poem (1982)
- Advent (1986)
- Chanterelles: Short Poems 1971–83 (1985)
- Poems and Versions 1929–1990, pref. by JCC Mays (1991),
- Poems from Mallarmé (1991)

Philosophy and criticism

- 'The Philosophy of Science and the Scientific Attitude: I', in The Modern Schoolman, 36 (1948), pp. 23–35
- 'The Notion of Order According to St. Thomas Aquinas', in The Modern Schoolman, 28, 1 (1949), pp. 1–18
- 'Notes on Modern Cosmological Speculation', in The Modern Schoolman, 29, 3 (1952), pp. 183–96
- 'Memory's Murphy Maker', in Threshold vol. 17 (1962), p. 33 [on Beckett]
- 'Of Denis Devlin: Vestiges, Sentences, Presages', in Irish University Review 2, 10 (1965), pp. 3–18
- 'A Note on Rat Island', in Irish University Review, Vol. 3. no. 8 (1966), pp. 25–8 *'Denis Devlin: Poet of Distance', in Andrew Carpenter, ed., Place, Personality and the Irish Writer (Gerrards Cross: Colin Smythe 1977), 137–57
- 'Extracts from "Concerning Making"’, in The Lace Curtain, 6 (Autumn 1978), pp.31–7
- "About Poetry", Dedalus Irish Poets: An Anthology [ed. JF Deane] (Dublin: Dedalus Press 1992) [c.p. 253-54].

As editor

- Denis Devlin Poems University Review [Special Issue] (1963; Dolmen 1964)
- Denis Devlin's The Heavenly Foreigner (1967)

== See also ==
- Tomás Ó Cobhthaigh, poet, died 1474
- Aeneas Coffey, 1780–1852
