= SoundEye Festival =

Annual poetry festival in Cork, Ireland

The SoundEye Festival of the Arts of the Word is an annual festival of poetry and other related art forms. It is held annually in Cork City over several days in either late-June to mid-July, with over 20 poets reading at the 2017 event. Events take place in venues such as the Guesthouse and Firkin Crane within the city.

== History ==
The festival was initially directed by poet Trevor Joyce, who had co-founded New Writers Press in 1967 along with Michael Smith. Joyce (who lives in the Shandon area of Cork) was invited to a US literary conference in the 1990s, and began planning the first 'Cork Alternative Poetry Festival' shortly afterwards.

In 2005, the festival received European Capital of Culture funding and collaborated with contiguous arts events through the involvement of Fergal Gaynor, who was then co-curating the Cork Caucus. In 2010, poets James Cummins and Rachel Warriner, who had programmed a section of the festival linked with their Default magazine, took over some of the festival's organisational duties.

SoundEye has been associated with modernist and avant-garde poetry, and now includes elements of video art, performance, sound poetry, and conceptual art. SoundEye has hosted readings by Irish poets, poets from other anglophone countries, and occasionally from non-anglophone nations.
