= Ireland Today =

Irish magazine

Ireland To-day was a literary magazine that ran from June 1936 to March 1938. It was edited by Jim O'Donovan and published work by many emerging and established Irish writers of the time, including Brian Coffey, Daniel Corkery, Frank O'Connor, Denis Devlin, Michael McLaverty, Ewart Milne, Seán Ó Faoláin, Liam O'Flaherty, and Mervyn Wall. Aloys Fleischmann wrote articles on Irish music in the magazine.

Politically liberal, Ireland To-day was one of the few Irish publications to support the Republican side during the Spanish Civil War. This position altered, however, when the socialist Owen Sheehy Skeffington was replaced as contributor of 'A Foreign Commentary'.
