= Denyse Woods =

Writer

- Born: Denyse Woods; 1958 (age 67–68); Boston, Massachusetts
- Occupation: Writer

Denyse Woods (born 1958) is an Irish writer.

== Early life ==
Denyse Woods was born in Boston, Massachusetts, in 1958, daughter of Gerard Woods, Irish Consul-General in Boston and his wife Finola Devlin. Her father was to be Ambassador to Australia, Belgium and the Holy See. Her uncle was the poet and diplomat Denis Devlin. Her mother died while her father was posted to Rome and Woods was sent to a boarding school in Ireland. After school Woods initially did a secretarial course. A later job in Iraq led to her to study Arabic and English at University College, Dublin. Her father died five years after her mother. Woods was left with two older siblings, a brother Henry and a sister Anne.

== Cork ==
Both with her family growing up and later after college, Woods travelled extensively before finally moving to live in Cork with her husband and their two daughters, where she was the director for the West Cork Literary Festival for four years. She has also been the resident tutor for the Country House Writers' Weekend and writer-in-residence with Cork County Library.

== Fiction prizes ==
Denyse Woods won the Florida Keys Flash Fiction Contest in 2016. She also won The Irish Times short-story award in 2010.

Woods also writes under the name Denyse Devlin.

== Bibliography ==
- Overnight to Innsbruck (Lilliput Press, 2002)
- The Catalpa Tree (Penguin Ireland, 2004)
- Like Nowhere Else (Penguin Ireland, 2005)
- Hopscotch (Penguin Ireland, 2006)
- If Not Now (Penguin Ireland, 2008)
- Of Sea and Sand (2018)
