= Cork Caucus =

Artist collective based in Cork

- Part of European Capital of Culture Cork, 2005
- Logo
- Date: 20 June – 11 July 2005
- Location: Cork, Ireland
- Theme: Culture, politics, art
- Organized by: David Dobz O'Brien, Fergal Gaynor, Annie Fletcher and Charles Esche (curators)
- Website: www.corkcaucus.ie

Cork Caucus (Irish: Cácas Chorcaí, 20 June to 11 July 2005) was an interdisciplinary meeting of 60 to 80 artists, thinkers, writers, philosophers and other creative individuals, held in Cork, Ireland. The caucus investigated cultural, political and artistic issues.

== Organisation ==
The Cork Caucus project was devised by the National Sculpture Factory as part of Cork's tenure as European Capital of Culture in 2005, and was curated by Charles Esche, Annie Fletcher, and Art/not art (David Dobz O'Brien and Fergal Gaynor). In addition to lectures and exhibitions, the organisers also coordinated two outdoor public events.

== Participants and supporters ==
The origins of the project date to at least early 2004 when Charles Esche, director and curator of the Van Abbemuseum in Eindhoven, visited Cork. Fergal Gaynor, who was one of the co-curators of the project, was also a co-organiser of the SoundEye Festival and the 2009 festival The Avant: Ten Days of the Progressive Arts. Other participants in the Cork Caucus events included Vito Acconci, Maria Eichhorn, Bik Van der Pol, Sarat Maharaj, Chantal Mouffe and Gayatri Chakravorty Spivak.

Cork Caucus was funded by organisations including the European Cultural Foundation, Arts Council England, British Council and Danish Arts Council's Committee for International Visual Art.
