= Michael Hartnett =

Irish poet, known for work in English and Irish languages

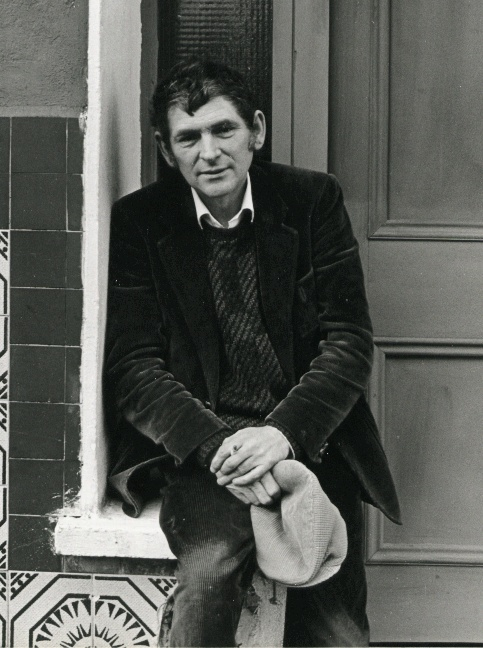
Michael Hartnett

Michael Hartnett (Irish: Mícheál Ó hAirtnéide) (18 September 1941 – 13 October 1999) was an Irish poet who wrote in both English and Irish. He was one of the most significant voices in late 20th-century Irish writing and has been called "Munster's de facto poet laureate".

== Early life ==
Michael Harnett was born in Croom Hospital, County Limerick. Although his parents' name was Harnett, he was registered in error as Hartnett on his birth certificate. In later life he declined to change this as his legal name was closer to the Irish Ó hAirtnéide. He grew up in the Maiden Street area of Newcastle West, County Limerick, spending much of his time with his grandmother Bridget Halpin, who resided in the townland of Camas, in the countryside nearby. Hartnett said that his grandmother was one of the last native speakers to live in County Limerick, though she was originally from north Kerry. He recalls that, although she spoke to him mainly in English, he would listen to her conversing with her friends in Irish, and as such, he was quite unaware of the imbalances between English and Irish, since he experienced the free interchange of both languages. When he began school, he was made aware of the tensions between both languages, and was surprised to discover that Irish was considered an endangered language, taught as a contrived, rule-laden code, with little of the literary attraction which it held for him.

He was educated in the local national and secondary schools in Newcastle West. Hartnett emigrated to England the day after he finished his secondary education and went to work as a tea boy on a building site in London.

== Early writings ==
Hartnett had started writing by this time and his work came to the attention of the poet John Jordan, who was professor of English at University College Dublin. Jordan invited Hartnett to attend the university for a year. While back in Dublin, Hartnett co-edited the literary magazine Arena with James Liddy. He also worked as curator of Joyce's tower at Sandycove for a time. He returned briefly to London, where he met Rosemary Grantley on 16 May 1965, and they were married on 4 April 1966. His first book, Anatomy of a Cliché, a book of love poetry dedicated to his wife was published in 1968 to critical acclaim and was the beginning of his serious writing life and he returned to live permanently in Dublin that same year.

He worked as a night telephonist at the telephone exchange on Exchequer Street. He now entered a productive relationship with New Writers Press, run by Michael Smith and Trevor Joyce. They published his next three books. The first of these was a translation from the Irish, The Old Hag of Beare (1969), followed by Selected Poems (1970) and Tao (1972). This last book was a version of the Chinese Tao Te Ching. His Gypsy Ballads (1973), a translation of the Romancero Gitano of Federico García Lorca was published by the Goldsmith Press.

== A Farewell to English ==
In 1974 Hartnett decided to leave Dublin to return to his rural roots, as well as deepen his relationship with the Irish language. He went to live in Templeglantine, five miles from Newcastle West. Also, in 1974, he first won both the Irish American Literature Award and the Arts Council Award in the same year. Then in 1975, he made the great and bold political statement that he was going to no longer write in English but that he was going to "court the language of his people" with the publication of A Farewell to English. A number of volumes in Irish followed: Adharca Broic (1978), An Phurgóid (1983) and Do Nuala: Foighne Chrainn (1984). He received the Irish-American Cultural Institute Award in 1980, and the Irish Arts Council Award for the best book in Irish in 1986.

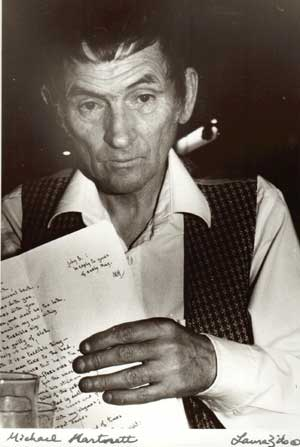
Hartnett

A biography on this period of Michael Hartnett's life entitled 'A Rebel Act Michael Hartnett's Farewell To English' by Pat Walsh was published in 2012 by Mercier Press.

== Later life and works ==
In 1984 he returned to Dublin to live in the suburb of Inchicore. The following year marked his return to English with the publication of Inchicore Haiku, a book that deals with the turbulent events in his personal life over the previous few years. This was followed by a number of books in English including A Necklace of Wrens (1987), Poems to Younger Women (1989) and The Killing of Dreams (1992). These critically acclaimed works contributed to his winning the Irish American Cultural Institute Award in 1988, and the American-Ireland Fund Literary Award in 1990. Selected and New Poems (1994) was published both in Ireland and the USA.

He also continued working in Irish, and produced a sequence of important volumes of translation of classic works into English. These included Ó Bruadair, Selected Poems of Dáibhí Ó Bruadair (1985) and Ó Rathaille The Poems of Aodhaghán Ó Rathaille (1999). His Collected Poems appeared in two volumes in 1984 and 1987 and New and Selected Poems in 1995. In 1999, the documentary film on his life and work: Michael Hartnett: Necklace of Wrens, was widely shown on Irish television to critical acclaim and won several prizes. Also, during the late 1990s, his poetry was added to the Irish final secondary school exam, the Leaving Certificate

== Death ==
Hartnett died from Alcoholic Liver Disease in October 1999 following a stroke in Listowel and after repeated visits to the hospital over the years. He is buried in Newcastle West.

== Legacy ==
Seamus Heaney has written that he is "one of the truest, most tested and beloved voices in Irish poetry in our time."

The Collected Poems, A Book of Strays and Translations were published in 2001, 2002 and 2003 respectively by Gallery Press.

=== Éigse Michael Hartnett ===
Every October a literary and arts festival is held in Newcastle West in honour of Michael Hartnett. Events are organised throughout the town and a memorial lecture is given by a distinguished guest. Former speakers include Nuala O'Faolain, Paul Durcan, David Whyte and Fintan O'Toole. The annual Michael Hartnett Poetry Award of 4000 euro also forms part of the festival. Funded by the Limerick City and County Council Arts Office and the Arts Council of Ireland, it is intended to support and encourage poets in the furtherance of their writing endeavours. Previous winners include Sinéad Morrissey and Peter Sirr.

During the 2011 Éigse, Paul Durcan unveiled a bronze life-sized statue of Michael Hartnett sculpted by Rory Breslin, in the Square, Newcastle West. Hartnett's son Niall spoke at the unveiling ceremony.

== Personal life ==
During the mid-1970s, when the family relocated to an isolated cottage in Glendarragh, Templeglantine, West Limerick, Rosemary Hartnett was the sole wage earner for the family. Her employment provided the total financial security and material freedom that allowed Michael Hartnett to focus entirely on his poetry and his transition to writing exclusively in the Irish language, completely unburdened by the need to earn a living. He did work for a brief time as a part-time lecturer in creative writing at Thomond College of Education, Limerick. The marriage later dissolved due to Michael's severe alcoholism, leading to their separation in the mid-1980s. Despite her subsequent marriage to the noted Irish playwright Kevin Grattan, she chose to permanently retain her name as Rosemary Hartnett.

Michael and Rosemary had a daughter, Lara, who lives in Australia, and a son, Niall, who lives in America. Niall manages the writer's estate and copyrights in conjunction with Gallery Press.

Following Hartnett's death in 1999, the family actively worked to preserve his legacy. This culminated in the publication of Notes from His Contemporaries: A Tribute to Michael Hartnett, a historic photo-anthology compiled by their son, Niall. Rosemary Hartnett performed the final edit of all the text for this volume. Furthermore, the book was self-published, and was funded through the financial support of Rosemary’s second husband, the playwright Kevin Grattan. This contribution is formally documented in print within the acknowledgments of the tribute volume itself, which reads: "Grateful thanks to my mother, Rosemary Grattan [Hartnett], for the final edit of all the text and to my stepfather, Kevin Grattan, for financial support, without which this book would have been impossible."

== Publication history ==
- Anatomy of a Cliché (Dublin: Dolmen Press 1968)
- The Hag of Beare, trans. from Irish (Dublin: New Writers Press 1969)
- A Farewell to English (Gallery Press 1975)
- Cúlú Íde/ The Retreat of Ita Cagney (Goldsmith Press 1975)
- Poems in English (Dublin: Dolmen Press 1977)
- Prisoners : (Gallery Press 1977)
- Adharca Broic (Gallery Press 1978)
- An Phurgóid (Coiscéim 1983)
- Do Nuala, Foidhne Chuainn ( Coiscéim 1984)
- Collected Poems Vol I (Raven Arts Press 1984)
- Inchicore Haiku (Raven Arts Press 1985)
- An Lia Nocht (Coiscéim 1985)
- Collected Poems Vol II (Raven Arts Press 1986)
- A Necklace of Wrens: Poems in Irish and English (Gallery Press 1987)
- Poems to Younger Women (Gallery Press 1988)
- The Killing of Dreams (Gallery Press 1992)
- Selected and New Poems (Gallery Press 1994)
- Collected Poems (Gallery Press 2001)
- A Book of Strays (Gallery Press 2001)

=== Select translations ===
- Tao: A Version of the Chinese Classic of the Sixth Century (New Writers Press 1971)
- Gypsy Ballads: A Version of the Romancero Gitano of Federico Garcia Lorca (Newbridge: Goldsmith Press 1973)
- Ó Bruadair (Gallery Press 1985)
- Selected Poems of Nuala Ní Domhnaill (Raven Arts Press 1986)
- An Damh-Mhac, trans. from Hungarian of Ferenc (Juhász 1987)
- Dánta Naomh Eoin na Croise, translation from St. John of the Cross (Coiscéim 1991)
- Haicéad (Gallery Press 1993)
- Ó Rathaille: The Poems of Aodhaghán Ó Rathaille (Gallery Press 1999)
- Translations (Gallery Press 2002)

== Reviews ==
- Murphy, Hayden (1976), review of A Farewell to English, in Burnett, Ray (ed.), Calgacus 3, Spring 1976, pp. 55 & 56, ISSN 0307-2029
