= Tom MacIntyre =

Irish poet, playwright, and writer (1931–2019)

- Born: 10 December 1931; Cavan, Ireland
- Died: 31 October 2019 (aged 87)
- Occupations: Poet; playwright; writer

Tom MacIntyre (10 December 1931 – 31 October 2019) was an Irish poet, playwright and writer. Born in Cavan, he grew up in Bailieborough with his four siblings, and briefly worked as a pharmaceutical chemist, before deciding to write.

MacIntyre played as a goalkeeper for the Cavan junior team which won the Ulster Championship in 1957, and reportedly, also played in the same position for the Cavan senior team.

He was a member of the New Writers Press and became a member of Aosdána in 1981.

He taught at Clongowes Wood College and at American universities, among them the University of Michigan at Ann Arbor and Williams College, Massachusetts.

== Works ==
=== Poetry ===
- Blood Relations: Versions of Gaelic Poems of the Seventeenth and Eighteenth Centuries (1972),
- A Glance Will Tell You and A Dream (1994),
- Ag Caint leis an mBanríon - Coiscéim (1997),
- Silenus na gCat - Coiscéim (1999),
- Stories of the Wandering Moon (2000)
- Tamall Suirí - Coiscéim (2004),

=== Plays ===
- Eye Winker-Tom Tinker: 1972, directed by Lelia Doolan at the Abbey Theatre, tells the story of Shooks, an exiled revolutionary leader who returns to galvanise his HQ staff at headquarters with his charm, dynamic force and mystique.
- Jack be Nimble: 1976, directed by Patrick Mason.
- Find the Lady: 1977
- The Great Hunger: 1983, directed by Patrick Mason at the Abbey Theatre of Dublin in 1983–6. The Great Hunger is an adaptation of the Patrick Kavanagh poem of the same name about a farmer named Maguire. Despite the name, the play deals not with Maguire's physical hunger, but rather his spiritual and sensual hunger.
- The Bearded Lady: 1984
- Rise up Lovely Sweeney: 1985
- Dance for Your Daddy: 1987, Abbey Theatre. Daughter, 18, has to say goodbye to Daddy. But the two are so close. Say bye bye - but not yet.
- Snow White: 1988
- Foggy Hair and Green Eyes: 1991
- Sheep's Milk on the Boil: 1994. Somewhere in Ireland's deepest countryside, a couple on the brink of losing their one-time love, are suddenly hurtled through a series of fantastical events conducted by a motley band of spirit-demons, who mercilessly toy with their lives and emotions, throwing them between ecstasy and despair and leaving them both in a thorough state.
- Chickadee: 1992, Red Kettle Theatre Company. Hubert is an older and wiser man, and Julie is younger and more innocent. Their relationship, tender and uncertain from within, is subject to the disapproval of Mom and the resigned acceptance of Dad. Bonzo, Hubert's friend, is the voice of indifferent reason, bemused by Hubert's folly, while Julie's friends, Daphne and Sunniva, offer advice and support as Julie is torn by jealously of the past and uncertainty of the future.
- Fine Day for a Hunt: 1992
- Good Evening, Mr. Collins: 1995, directed by Kathy Mcardle. Fine Day For a Hunt presents a chase. Huntsmen come crashing onto the stage, beagles strain to pick up the scent, spectators lean forward and the commentators give the odds. What is being hunted, however, is a young naked female.
- The Chirpaun: 1997, directed by Kathy McArdle. In the play, John Joe broods on his seventeen-year-old daughter's pregnancy, and who the father could be. Jacinta herself teases him with the identity of who has left her carrying 'the chirpaun'. In despair, John Joe turns to a hypnotist, hoping to find some release from the consuming anger.
- Caoineadh Airt Uí Laoghaire (1998) (winner of the Stewart Parker Prize), directed by Kathy McArdle. The play is a re-telling of the story of Art O'Leary who was killed in the eighteenth century and of the poem said to be composed about him by his wife Eibhlín Dubh Ní Chonaill.
- The Midnight Court: 1999
- The Gallant John-Joe: 2001, which won The Irish Times/ ESB Irish Theatre Best New Play Award in 2002. The Gallant John-Joe is the soliloquy of a Cavan widower grappling with physical and mental infirmity. What keeps him on his feet is his capacity to tell stories, to make a story of anything that moves, using language as a crutch, ointment, talisman, intoxicant. In his stories he introduces us to the characters in his life: Bossman, his well-to-do patronising friend, The Hitmatist; The Chinee; John-Joe O'Reilly, captain of the conquering Cavan team of the late 1940s, and Jacinta, his teenage daughter.
- What Happened Bridgie Cleary: 2005, directed by Alan Gilsenan at the Abbey Theatre. Bridgie Cleary was burned alive for alleged witchcraft in 1895, and in the play, she is reunited in the anteroom of Heaven with her husband and lover.
- Only an Apple: 2009, directed by Selena Cartmell. Fearing the rising star of his ambitious chief whip, the Taoiseach decides to eliminate his rival through the time-honoured means of sex and scandal. His chosen accomplices are Queen Elizabeth I of England and Grace O'Malley, the Pirate Queen. Arriving in a raucous storm of sexual mischief, the royal guests proceed to wreak merry havoc on the Taoiseach's household, leaving their host with considerably more than he had originally bargained for.
