= Res Philosophica =

Philosophy journal

- Discipline: Philosophy
- Language: English
- Edited by: Joe Salerno

Publication details
- History: 1925–2012; named changed to Res Philosophica in 2013
- Publisher: Saint Louis University, Dept. of Philosophy (United States)
- Frequency: quarterly

Standard abbreviations
- ISO 4: Res Philos.

Indexing
- ISSN: 0026-8402 (print); 2164-0726 (web)
- LCCN: sf79-10210
- OCLC no.: 1758490

Links
- Journal homepage; Online access

Res Philosophica (formerly The Modern Schoolman) is a peer-reviewed academic journal covering all major areas of philosophy from antiquity to the present. Established in 1925, it is one of the oldest philosophy publications in North America. The journal publishes both articles and reviews, and occasionally publishes special issues on specific topics. Contributors include Robert Audi, Lynne Rudder Baker, Jean Bethke Elshtain, Étienne Gilson, Jürgen Habermas, Norman Kretzmann, Bernard Lonergan, Jacques Maritain, Wildrid Parsons, Kristin Shrader-Frechette, Paul Draper, and Nicholas Wolterstorff. The journal is published by the philosophy department at Saint Louis University, in cooperation with the Philosophy Documentation Center.

In 2013, beginning with volume 90, The Modern Schoolman was relaunched as Res Philosophica.

== See also ==
- List of philosophy journals
