= Geoffrey Squires =

Irish poet (born 1942)

Geoffrey Squires (born 16 November 1942, in Derry, Northern Ireland) is an Irish poet who works in what might loosely be termed the modernist tradition.

== Early life ==
While born in Derry, he grew up in County Donegal, Republic of Ireland. He read English at Cambridge, and gained a PhD in multi-media instructional systems in adult education from the University of Edinburgh in 1970. During his career, Squires translated poems that were written in the Persian language and French language. His early work was influenced by the poetry and poetics of Charles Olson.

== Later life ==
Between the mid 1970s and mid 1990s, Squires wrote poetry and submitted education journal articles. By the 2000s, Squires began working for the University of Hull in charge of their education department while also working as a reader. He is now retired and lives in Hull. American poet and critic Robert Archambeau has described his work as 'a poetry of immediate consciousness'. His more recent writings show the effect of the study of Maurice Merleau-Ponty's theory of perception.

== Works ==
=== Poetry ===
- Sixteen Poems (1969)
- Drowned Stones (1975)
- Figures (1978)
- XXI Poems (1980)
- Landscapes & Silences (1996)
- A Long Poem in Three Sections (1997)
- This (1997)
- Untitled and other poems 1975-2002 (2004)
- Abstract Lyrics and Other Poems 2006-2012 (2012)
- Poem at the Turn of the Year (2012)
- Sans Titre, French translation of "Untitled III" (Editions Unes, 2013)
- Paysages et Silences, French translation of "Landscapes & Silences" (Editions Unes, 2014)
- My News for You (Shearsman, 2015)
- 106 Early Irish Poems (LegalHighsPress, 2022)
- Triptych, (LegalHighPress, 2024)
- Choix de poèmes, trans. François Heusbourg, (Editions Unes, 2024)

=== Education related ===
- Cognitive Styles and Adult Learning (1981)
- The Analysis of Teaching (1982)
- Innovation Through Recession (1983)
- The Curriculum Beyond School (1987)
- Teaching and Training (1988)
- Pathways for Learning (1989)
- First Degree: The Undergraduate Curriculum (1990)
- Teaching as a Professional Discipline (1999)
- Managing Your Learning (2002)
- Trouble-Shooting Your Teaching (2002)
