= New Writers Press =

Irish publisher specialising in poetry

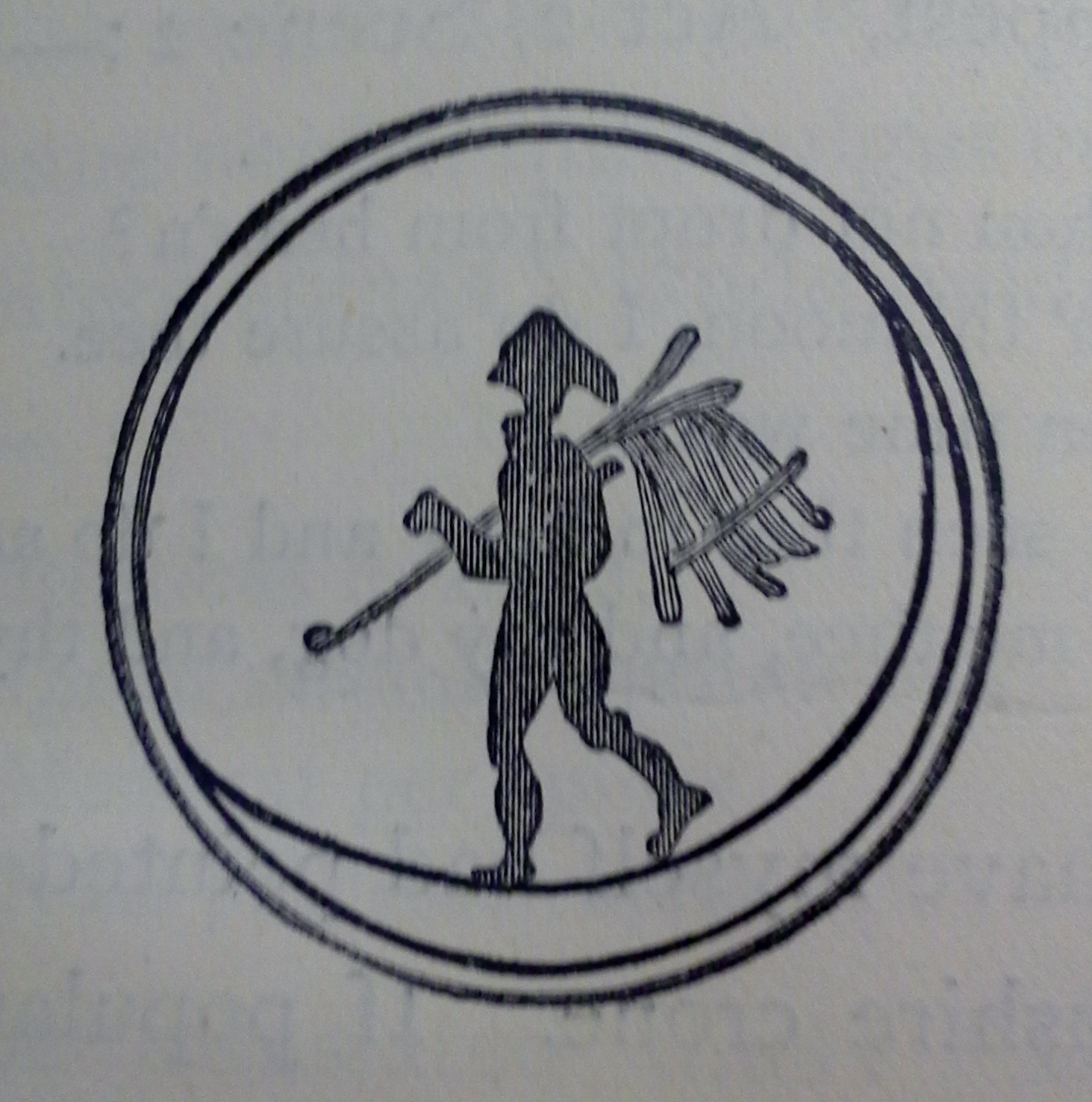
- Founded: 1967
- Founder: Michael Smith and Trevor Joyce
- Country of origin: Ireland
- Headquarters location: Dublin
- Publication types: Books

New Writers' Press was an Irish small press that specialised in poetry publishing. The press was founded in 1967 by the poets Michael Smith and Trevor Joyce and Smith's wife Irene in response to what they felt to be the stagnant state of Irish poetry at the time. The first volume published by the press was Joyce's debut collection, "Sole Glum Trek", which included an editorial by Smith that communicated the purpose of the press as follows:

[T]o bring out a series of small books each of which will give a young poet the chance of finding the audience so necessary to him ...
Most of the poets whose work will be included in this series are Irish and under thirty. Believing poets should be beyond the herd
instinct, they belong to no school, movement, club or clique. They are all serious poets, that is, human beings for whom writing poetry :: is morally, a profoundly central activity, not a mere hobby or ornamental grace. (Joyce, 1995: 277)

The press was very active for the first 12 years of its existence, publishing some 46 items, including the six issues of the journal The Lace Curtain. Since 1979, there have been approximately 12 new titles, some of them in collaboration with British, Canadian and Polish small press publishers.

The press was committed to helping revive interest in the modernist tradition in Irish poetry, and to this end they published Thomas MacGreevy's Collected Poems, Brian Coffey's Selected Poems and a special 1930s issue of the journal, all in 1971.

In addition to work by Coffey, MacGreevy, Joyce and Smith, New Writers Press authors included John Jordan, Anthony Cronin, Michael Hartnett, Augustus Young, Jack Spicer, Tom MacIntyre, Patrick Galvin, Paul Durcan, Robert Pawlowski, and Antonio Machado (in Smith's translation).

== Notable titles ==
- Poems. Jorge Luis Borges. Translated by Anthony Kerrigan. 1967.
- The Lace Curtain, Issues 1–6. Ed. Michael Smith and Trevor Joyce. 1969 - 1978
- Selected Poems. Brian Coffey. 1971.
- The Poems of Sweeny, Peregrine. Trevor Joyce. 1976.
