= Bríd Ní Mhóráin =

Irish poet

- Born: 1951 (age 74–75); Newmarket, County Cork
- Writing career
- Notable work: poetry

Bríd Ní Mhóráin (born 1951) is an Irish poet.

== Biography ==
Ní Mhóráin was born in Newmarket, County Cork, and raised in west County Kerry. She taught languages in Tralee from 1975 to 2001.

== Select works ==
- Ceiliúradh Cré, Coiscéim, 1992
- Fé Bhrat Bhríde, An Sagart, 2002
- Síolta an Iomais, Cló Iar-Chonnachta, 2006
- An Cosán Bán/The White Path, Oidhreacht Chorca Dhuibhne 2008
