= Denis Devlin =

Irish poet (1908–1959)

Denis Devlin (15 April 1908 – 21 August 1959) was, along with Samuel Beckett, Thomas MacGreevy and Brian Coffey, one of the generation of Irish modernist poets to emerge at the end of the 1920s. He was also a career diplomat.

== Early life and studies ==
He was born in Greenock, Scotland of Irish parents, and his family returned to live in Dublin in 1918. He studied at Belvedere College and, from 1926, as a seminarian for the Roman Catholic priesthood at Clonliffe College. As part of his studies, he attended a degree course in modern languages at University College Dublin (UCD), where he met and befriended Brian Coffey. Together they published a joint collection, Poems, in 1930.

In 1927, Devlin abandoned the priesthood and left Clonliffe. He graduated with from UCD his BA in 1930 and spent that summer on the Blasket Islands to improve his spoken Irish. Between 1930 and 1933, he studied literature at the Ludwig-Maximilians-Universität München and the Sorbonne in Paris, meeting, amongst others, Beckett and Thomas MacGreevy. He then returned to UCD to complete his MA thesis on Montaigne.

His niece Denyse Woods went on to become a writer.

== Diplomatic career and later writings ==
He joined the Irish Diplomatic Service in 1935 and spent a number of years in Rome as the Irish Ambassador (1958), New York and Washington. During this time he met the French poet Saint-John Perse, and the Americans Allen Tate and Robert Penn Warren. He went on to publish a translation of Exile and Other Poems by St-John Perse, and Tate and Warren edited his posthumous Selected Poems.

Since his death, there have been two Collected Poems published; the first in 1964 was edited by Coffey, and the second in 1989 by J.C.C. Mays.

His personal papers are held in University College Dublin Archives.

== Sources ==
- Coffey, Brian. Biographical note in Denis Devlin Collected Poems (The Dolmen Press, 1964)
- Denis Devlin at Ricorso
- Jack Morgan. Denis Devlin (1908-1959). In: Modern Irish Writers: A Bio-Critical Sourcebook. Alexander G. Gonzalez (Editor), pp. 64–68. Greenwood Publishing Group, 1997. ISBN 978-0-313-29557-7
- Wilson, James Matthew: Catholic modernism and the Irish "avant-garde": the achievement of Brian Coffey, Denis Devlin, and Thomas MacGreevy, Washington, D.C.: The Catholic University of America Press, 2023, ISBN 978-0-8132-3763-3
