= Augustus Young =

Irish poet (born 1943)

Augustus Young (born 1943 in Cork, Ireland) is an Irish poet.

== Biography ==
Young worked in London as an epidemiologist and adviser to health authorities, and now lives in France. His first collections of poems, Survival (1969) and On Loaning Hill (1972), already manifested a departure from the ‘reach for the shovel’ tendency in Irish writing. Since then he has regularly published collections of poems, including Danta Gradha: Love Poems from the Irish (1975, 1980), the three-part extended verse work The Credit (1980/1986) and Lampion and His Bandits: Literature of the Cordel in Brazil (1994). This period is covered in detail in The Oxford Companion to Irish Literature (1996).

More recent poetry publications include Diversifications (2009), a revised edition of Rosemaries (2009, first edition 1976), Days and Nights in Hendon (2002) and Lightning in Low Places (2000). He has also published many scientific papers.

The widely acclaimed autofiction Light Years (2002), his first full-length work in prose, was followed by Storytime (2005) and The Secret Gloss: A Film Play on the Life and Work of Soren Kierkegaard (2009). His most recent full work in prose is The Nicotine Cat and Other People (2009).

Augustus Young's poems and prose appear in anthologies and periodicals in Ireland, America and the United Kingdom and international online reviews (Cyphers, Sniper Logic, Books Ireland, London Magazine, Hopscotch, Modern Poetry in Translation, Leviathan Quarterly, Arete, Ars Interpres, Stand, An Sionnach, New Hibernia Review, Temporel, Golden Handcuffs, Carte Allineate etc.).

There is a regular webzine of new and unpublished work.
