= Michael Smith (poet) =

Irish poet and translator

- Born: 1 September 1942; Dublin, Ireland
- Died: 16 November 2014 (aged 72); Dublin, Ireland
- Occupations: Poet, translator
- Spouse: Irene Smith
- Children: 3
- Writing career
- Genre: Poetry
- Literary movement: Modernism

Michael Smith (1942–2014) was an Irish poet, author and translator. A member of Aosdána, the Irish National Academy of Artists, Michael Smith was the first Writer-in-Residence to be appointed by University College, Dublin and was an Honorary Fellow of UCD. He was a poet who gave a lifetime of service to the art of poetry both in English and Spanish. He has been described as a classical modernist, a poet of modern life.

Smith founded New Writers Press in Dublin in 1967 (together with Trevor Joyce and his wife, Irene Smith) and was responsible for the publication of over seventy books and magazines. He was the founder and editor of the influential literary magazine The Lace Curtain. From 1984 to 1989 he was a member of the Arts Council. He has translated into English and published some of the most difficult and exhilarating poets in Spanish, including Federico García Lorca, Pablo Neruda, Miguel Hernández (Unceasing Lightning) and the two great Spanish masters of the baroque, Francisco de Quevedo and Luis de Góngora. He has also translated Gerardo Diego's Manual de espumas, a Selected Poems of José Hierro and selections of the poems of Jiménez and Luis Cernuda, among others. In 2001 he received the prestigious translating award, the European Academy Medal, for his translation of great Spanish poets. His own poetry has appeared in numerous anthologies of Irish poetry, including The Penguin Book of Contemporary Irish Poetry. Among his most recent books are The Purpose of the Gift: Selected Poems and Maldon and Other Translations (NWP/ Shearsman). His poetry has been translated into Spanish, Polish, French and German. Among his most recent publications are Selected Poems of Rosalía de Castro, The Prison Poems of Miguel Hernández (Parlor Press) and, with Luis Ingelmo, Complete Poems of Claudio Rodriguéz (Shearsman Books), as well as Complete Poems of Gustavo Adolfo Bécquer. In 2009, Shearsman published his Collected Poems. With the Peruvian scholar Valentino Gianuzzi, he has translated and published (Shearsman Books) the complete poems of César Vallejo in four volumes. In 2009 he translated a selection of poems by the Spanish poet Juan Antonio Villacañas in collaboration with Beatriz Villacañas: Juan Antonio Villacañas: Selected Poems (Shearsman Books).
