= Thomas MacGreevy =

Irish poet

Thomas MacGreevy (born Thomas McGreevy; 26 October 1893 – 16 March 1967) was a pivotal figure in the history of Irish literary modernism. A poet, he was also director of the National Gallery of Ireland from 1950 to 1963 and served on the first Irish Arts Council (An Chomhairle Ealaíon).

== Early life ==
Thomas McGreevy was born in Tarbert, County Kerry, the son of a Royal Irish Constabulary policeman and a primary school teacher. At the age of 16, he joined the British Civil Service as a boy clerk.

At the outbreak of the First World War he was promoted to an intelligence post with the Admiralty. He enlisted in 1916, and saw active service at the Battle of Ypres Salient and the Somme, being wounded twice. After the war he studied at Trinity College, Dublin, in whose library his papers are now held. He then became involved in various library organisations, began publishing articles in Irish periodicals, and wrote his first poems.

In 1941, he changed the spelling of his surname from McGreevy to MacGreevy.

== Poet ==
In 1924, MacGreevy was first introduced to James Joyce in Paris. The following year he moved to London, where he met T. S. Eliot and began writing for The Criterion and other magazines. He also began publishing his poetry.

In 1927, MacGreevy moved to Paris to teach English at the École Normale Supérieure. Here he met Samuel Beckett and resumed his friendship with Joyce. His essay The Catholic Element in Work In Progress was published in 1929 in Our Exagmination round His Factification for Incamination of Work In Progress, a book intended to help promote Joyce's Finnegans Wake. Along with Beckett, he was one of those who signed the Poetry is Vertical manifesto that appeared in issue 21 of transition. In 1931, he produced critical studies of both Eliot and Richard Aldington.

In 1934, Poems was published in London and New York City. The work shows that MacGreevy had absorbed the lessons of Imagism and of The Waste Land, but also demonstrates that he had brought something of his own to these influences. The book was admired by Wallace Stevens, and the two poets became regular correspondents.

Although MacGreevy continued to write poetry, this was the only collection published in his lifetime. Since his death there have been two Collected Poems issued, one in 1971 and an edited edition collecting his published and unpublished poetry published twenty years later.

== Art ==
In 1929 MacGreevy began working at Formes, a journal of the fine arts. He also published a translation of Paul Valéry's Introduction à la méthode de Léonard de Vinci as Introduction to the Method of Leonardo da Vinci. In the mid-1930s, he moved back to London and earned his living lecturing at the National Gallery there.

From 1938 to 1940 he was the chief art critic for The Studio. He published several books on art and artists, including Jack B. Yeats: An Appreciation and an Interpretation (on Jack Butler Yeats) and Pictures in the Irish National Gallery (both 1945), and Nicolas Poussin (1960) on Nicolas Poussin. He was director of the National Gallery of Ireland from 1950 to 1963.

== Religion ==
MacGreevy was a lifelong Roman Catholic. His faith informed both his poetry and his professional life. On returning to Dublin during the Second World War, he wrote for both the Father Mathew Record and The Capuchin Annual and joined the editorial board of the latter.
