= Trevor Joyce =

Irish poet (born 1947)

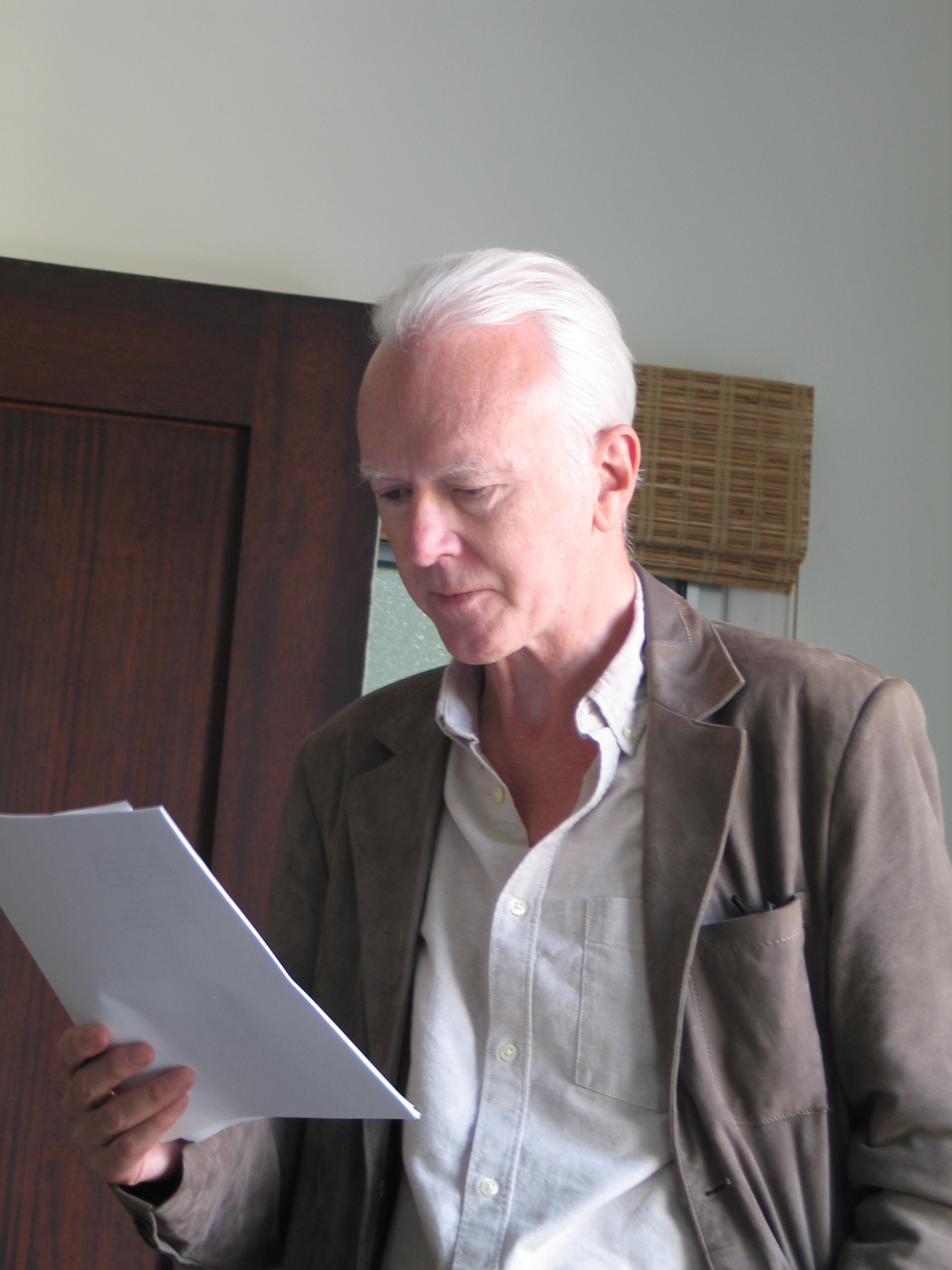
- Trevor Joyce reading his poems in Los Angeles, 2020.
- Born: 26 October 1947 (age 79); Dublin, Ireland
- Occupations: Poet, 1967 – present
- Relatives: Great-granduncles: Patrick Weston Joyce and Robert Dwyer Joyce
- Writing career
- Notable works: The Poems of Sweeny Peregrine (1976) with the first dream of fire they hunt the cold (2001); What's in Store (2007)

Trevor Joyce (born 26 October 1947) is an Irish poet, born in Dublin.

He co-founded New Writers' Press (NWP) in Dublin in 1967 and was a founding editor of NWP's The Lace Curtain; A Magazine of Poetry and Criticism in 1968.

Joyce was the Judith E. Wilson Visiting Poetry Fellow at the University of Cambridge in 2009/10 and he had residencies at Cill Rialaig, County Kerry, and at the University of Galway. He is also co-founder and director of the annual SoundEye Festival that is held in Cork City.

== Biography ==
Born in Dublin, Ireland, in 1947, Joyce was brought up between Mary Street, in the city centre, and the Galway Gaeltacht. Galway is the ancestral home of both his mother's and father's families, and Patrick Weston Joyce, historian, writer and collector of Irish music, and Robert Dwyer Joyce, poet, writer and fellow collector of music, are numbered among his great-granduncles. Recent poems such as "Trem Neul" see Joyce appropriate elements of the folk music gathered by Patrick Weston Joyce and engage ideas of lineage and transmission.

In Dublin and Oxford, in the early eighties, he conducted seminars and lectured on classical Chinese poetry. Having studied Philosophy and English at University College Dublin, he moved in 1984 to Cork, where he read Mathematical Sciences at University College Cork and he now resides in the city.

== Works ==
Early books include Sole Glum Trek (1967), Watches (1969), Pentahedron (1972) and The Poems of Sweeny Peregrine: A Working of the Corrupt Irish Text (1976). The last of these is a version of the Middle-Irish Buile Shuibhne, well known from Seamus Heaney's later translation in Sweeney Astray (1983).

After a near-total silence for 20 years, Joyce resumed publishing in 1995 with stone floods, followed by Syzygy and Without Asylum (1998). In 2001, with the first dream of fire they hunt the cold was published, which gathered all of the poet's major work from 1966 to 2000. In 2007, What's in Store: Poems 2000–2007 appeared, and in 2009 he published Courts of Air and Earth. His work appears in many anthologies, including Keith Tuma's Anthology of Twentieth-Century British and Irish Poetry and Patrick Crotty's The Penguin Book of Irish Poetry.

Joyce's poetry employs a wide range of forms and techniques, ranging from traditional to modern experimentalism. He has published notable versions from Chinese and from middle-Irish, which he refers to as "workings" rather than "translations" to emphasise that they are poetic reimaginings in the tradition of Ezra Pound rather than "straight" translations.

A collection of poems up to 2000, including his "workings" from the Irish and Chinese, was published as with the first dream of fire they hunt the cold (2001). He has also experimented with web-based poetry projects such as the collaborative project OffSets. A collection of his post-with the first dream work, What's in Store, was published in 2007. A separate collection of new and old translations from the Irish, entitled Courts of Air and Earth, was issued by Shearsman in 2009 and was shortlisted for the Corneliu M. Popescu Prize for European Poetry in Translation 2009.

He has also published several papers on contemporary poetics, and has lectured and given public readings of his work throughout Ireland, the UK and the USA.

== Awards ==
Awarded a Literary Bursary by the Irish Arts Council (2001), Joyce was a Fulbright Scholar for the year 2002–03. In 2004 he was elected a member of Aosdána, the Irish Affiliation of Artists, and was the first writer to be awarded a fellowship by the Ballinglen Arts Foundation. He held the Judith E Wilson Fellowship for poetry to the University of Cambridge for 2009/10. In 2017 he was named by previous winner, the English poet Tom Raworth, as the latest recipient of the biennial N. C. Kaser prize for poetry.

== Bibliography ==
From The Poems of Sweeny Peregrine

The blackthorn drinks my blood again,
My face bleeds on the sodden wood.

Flood and ebb encompass me;
lunar phases can't affect
the homicidal iron I dread

Thorns lance my sores. I doze.

— from The Poems of Sweeny Peregrine:
A Working of the Corrupt Irish Text (1976)

=== Poetry ===
- Sole Glum Trek (1967)
- Watches (1969)
- Pentahedron (1972)
- The Poems of Sweeny Peregrine: A Working of the Corrupt Irish Text (1976)
- stone floods (1995)
- Syzygy (1998)
- Hellbox (1998)
- Without Asylum (1998)
- with the first dream of fire they hunt the cold: a body of work, '66–'00 (2001)
- Take Over (2003)
- Undone, Say (2003)
- What's in Store: Poems 2000–2007 (2007)
- Courts of Air and Earth (2008)
- The Immediate Future (2013)
- Rome's Wreck (2014)
- Selected Poems (2014)
- Fastness (2017)
- Conspiracy (2024)

=== Prose ===
- “New Writers’ Press: The History of a Project.” Modernism and Ireland: The Poetry of the 1930s (1995)
- “The Point of Innovation in Irish Poetry.” For the Birds: Proceedings of the First Cork Conference on New and Experimental Irish Poetry (1998)
- “Why I Write Narrative.” Narrativity 1 (2000)
- “Interrogate the Thrush: Another Name for Something Else.” Vectors: New Poetics (2001)
- “Irish Terrain: Alternative Planes of Cleavage.” Assembling Alternatives: Reading Postmodern Poetries Transnationally (2003)
- “The Phantom Quarry: Translating a Renaissance Painting into Modern Poetry.” Enclave Review 8 (2013)
