= At Night (2026 film) =

2026 drama film

- Directed by: Beatrice Gibson
- Written by: Beatrice Gibson
- Produced by: Scott O'Donnell; Denna Cartamkhoob; Beatrice Gibson
- Starring: Diocouda Diaoune; Alice Notley; Katia Belo Cardoso; Sophie Robinson; Amy Gwatkin; Lily McMenamy; Adam Christensen; Denna Cartamkhoob; Pauline Curnier Jardin; Laida Lertxundi; Beatrice Gibson
- Cinematography: Ben Rivers
- Edited by: Liyo Gong
- Music by: Elvin Brandhi
- Production companies: BBC Film; Somesuch; Norte Productions
- Release date: 8 August 2026 (Locarno)
- Running time: 87 minutes
- Countries: United Kingdom; France
- Languages: English; French; Tibetan; Bambara

At Night is a 2026 drama film, written, directed, and produced by Beatrice Gibson, in their directorial debut. A co-production of the United Kingdom and France, it stars Diocouda Diaoune, Alice Notley, Katia Belo Cardoso, Sophie Robinson, Amy Gwatkin, and Lily McMenamy.

The film had its world premiere in the Filmmakers of the Present Competition of the 79th Locarno Film Festival on 9 August 2026, where it won the Best Emerging Director Award.

== Premise ==
Follows six women in Paris, including a filmmaker, a single mother, a former sex worker, and a poet.

== Cast ==
- Diocouda Diaoune as Didi
- Alice Notley
- Katia Belo Cardoso as Katia
- Sophie Robinson
- Amy Gwatkin as Amy
- Lily McMenamy
- Adam Christensen
- Denna Cartamkhoob
- Pauline Curnier Jardin
- Laida Lertxundi
- Beatrice Gibson as B

== Release ==
The film had its world premiere at the 79th Locarno Film Festival on 9 August 2026, where it competed for the Golden Leopard – Filmmakers of the Present and won the Best Emerging Director Award. It will also screen in the Wavelengths section of the 2026 Toronto International Film Festival on 12 September 2026. and the Currents section of the 2026 New York Film Festival on 3 October 2026.

== Reception ==
Rory O'Connor of The Film Stage praised the film calling it a standout of the 79th Locarno Film Festival writing: "The best movie I’ve seen in Locarno this year is set in Paris after dark, on sleepy side streets, in fluorescent eateries and nocturnal cafes and bars. At Night plays at the unhurried clip of a Rachel Cusk novel, and with similar shades of that author’s displaced POV and melancholic allure. As its images wash over you, you get a sense of an artist yearning for somewhere else while remaining resolutely curious for what’s around the corner."
