= Peter Barry (poet) =

British writer, poet, and literary theorist (born 1947)

Peter Thomas Barry FEA, FLSW
- Born: November 30, 1947 (age 78); Liverpool, England
- Occupations: Writer, academic
- Employer: Aberystwyth University
- Known for: Beginning Theory; Poetry Wars; The New British Poetries
- Title: Emeritus Professor of English
- Awards: Fellow of the English Association (FEA); Fellow of the Learned Society of Wales (FLSW)

Academic background
- Education: King's College London (BA); University of London, Institute of United States Studies (MA)
- Alma mater: King's College London; University of London

Academic work
- Discipline: English literature, Literary theory, Contemporary poetry
- Notable works: Beginning Theory: An Introduction to Literary and Cultural Theory (1995)

Peter Thomas Barry FEA, FLSW (born 30 November 1947) is a British writer, poet, and literary theorist. He is Emeritus Professor of English at Aberystwyth University and a Fellow of both the English Association and the Learned Society of Wales. Barry is best known for his influential textbook Beginning Theory: An Introduction to Literary and Cultural Theory (1995), which has shaped the teaching of literary theory in the English-speaking world. His research focuses on contemporary British poetry, literary theory, and pedagogy, and he has also written on ecocriticism, urban poetics, and the history of modern British poetry. In addition to his academic work, Barry has published poetry in journals such as Poetry Wales, New Welsh Review, and Stand.

== Background ==
Peter Barry was born on 30 November 1947 in Liverpool, England and educated in Catholic grammar schools and at Upholland College in Lancashire. He studied English at King's College London (1967–70) and American Studies (part-time) at London University's Institute of United States Studies (1970–72), where he was taught by Howell Daniels and Eric Mottram. He published a reminiscence of his London years in Robert Gavin Hampson and Ken Edwards (eds), Clasp: late modernist poetry in London in the 1970s. His two main academic appointments were at La Sainte Union College of Higher Education, Southampton (later Southampton University New College), as Lecturer, then Senior Lecturer in English (1980–95), and at the University of Wales, Aberystwyth (now Aberystwyth University). Here he was appointed as Senior Lecturer, and subsequently promoted to Reader and Professor of English. He is currently Emeritus Professor of English (1995–Present).

He was the editor of English (the journal of the English Association) for twenty years and was elected a Fellow of the English Association. In 2017, he was elected as a Fellow of the Learned Society of Wales (Cymdeithas Ddysgedig Cymru).

== Work ==
Barry's fields of academic specialism are contemporary poetry and literary theory. During the 1970s, he co-edited the poetry magazine Alembic (with Ken Edwards and Robert Gavin Hampson. Barry subsequently went on to set up his own magazine, Windows, which he co-edited from 1977 to 1981.

His first book, which grew out of this editorial experience, was The New British Poetries: the scope of the possible (Manchester University Press, 1993, ISBN 0-7190-3485-X), which he co-edited with Robert Gavin Hampson. He subsequently published Contemporary British poetry and the city (Manchester University Press, 2000, ISBN 0-7190-5594-6). This literary critical study of contemporary poets writing about the city was followed by Poetry Wars: British poetry of the 1970s and the Battle of Earls Court (Salt, 2006, ISBN 1-844712-47-8), an archive-based account of events in the Poetry Society in the 1970s. Poetry Wars received a positive review from Matthew Francis in the poetry journal P. N. Review.

Barry returned to poetry and the city in a series of essays. These include his contributions to Gladsongs and Gatherings: Poetry in its Social Context in Liverpool since the 1960s (ed. Stephen Wade, Liverpool University Press, 2001) and Writing Liverpool: Essays and Interviews (ed. Michael Murphy and Deryn Rees-Jones, Liverpool University Press, 2007), as well as 'London in Twentieth-Century Poetry' in The Cambridge Companion to London in English Literature (ed. Lawrence Manley, Cambridge University Press, 2011); 'Poetry and the City' in The Cambridge Companion to British Poetry, 1945-2010 (ed. Ed Larissy, Cambridge University Press, 2015); and 'Mapping the Geographies of Hurt in Barry MacSweeney and S. J. Litherland' in Poetry and Geography: Space and Place in Post-War Poetry (ed. David Cooper and Neal Alexander, Liverpool University Press, 2017).

At the same time, Barry was also publishing on literary theory. His first book in this field was Beginning Theory: An Introduction to Literary and Cultural Theory (Manchester University Press, 1995). This work has now gone through three editions and sold over 300,000 copies. According to Professor Steven Regan, Beginning Theory has had 'a vital role in shaping the way that theory is taught in Britain and North America'. In 2015, as part of Oxford University Press's celebration of University Press Week, Barry was asked to provide an account of the genesis and rationale of what was described as a 'ground-breaking and critically acclaimed undergraduate textbook'.

This orientation towards pedagogy was further evidenced in his next three books, English in Practice: In Pursuit of English Studies (Bloomsbury, 2003), Literature in Contexts (Manchester University Press, 2007 ISBN 978-0-7190-6455-5) and Reading Poetry (Manchester University Press, 2013), while he returned to literary theory with Extending Ecocriticism: Crisis Collaboration and Challenges in the Environmental Humanities (Manchester University Press, 2017, ISBN 978-1-78499-439-6), which he co-edited with William Wellstead.

Barry has also pursued these interests in literary theory, pedagogy and English studies through his editorials in English over twenty years and articles in journals like the THE and P. N. Review.

=== Poetry ===
Barry is also a published poet. He published his first pamphlet Bretton Days (Share) in the early 1970s, when he was one of the editors of Alembic with Ken Edwards and Robert Gavin Hampson. He was also one of the featured poets in Mugshots, the series produced by Mike Dobbie and Ulli McCarthy (1976–77). Over the past few years, he has published poetry in Poetry Wales, New Welsh Review and Stand, and a sequence of twelve poems about life at Upholland was included in the anthology Kaleidoscope from Cinnamon Press in 2011.

=== Scholarship ===
In 2013, he was the Principal Investigator for the three-year Leverhulme-funded project, Devolved Voices, on English-language poetry written in Wales since Welsh Devolution in 1997.
