= Misanthropy =

General dislike of humanity

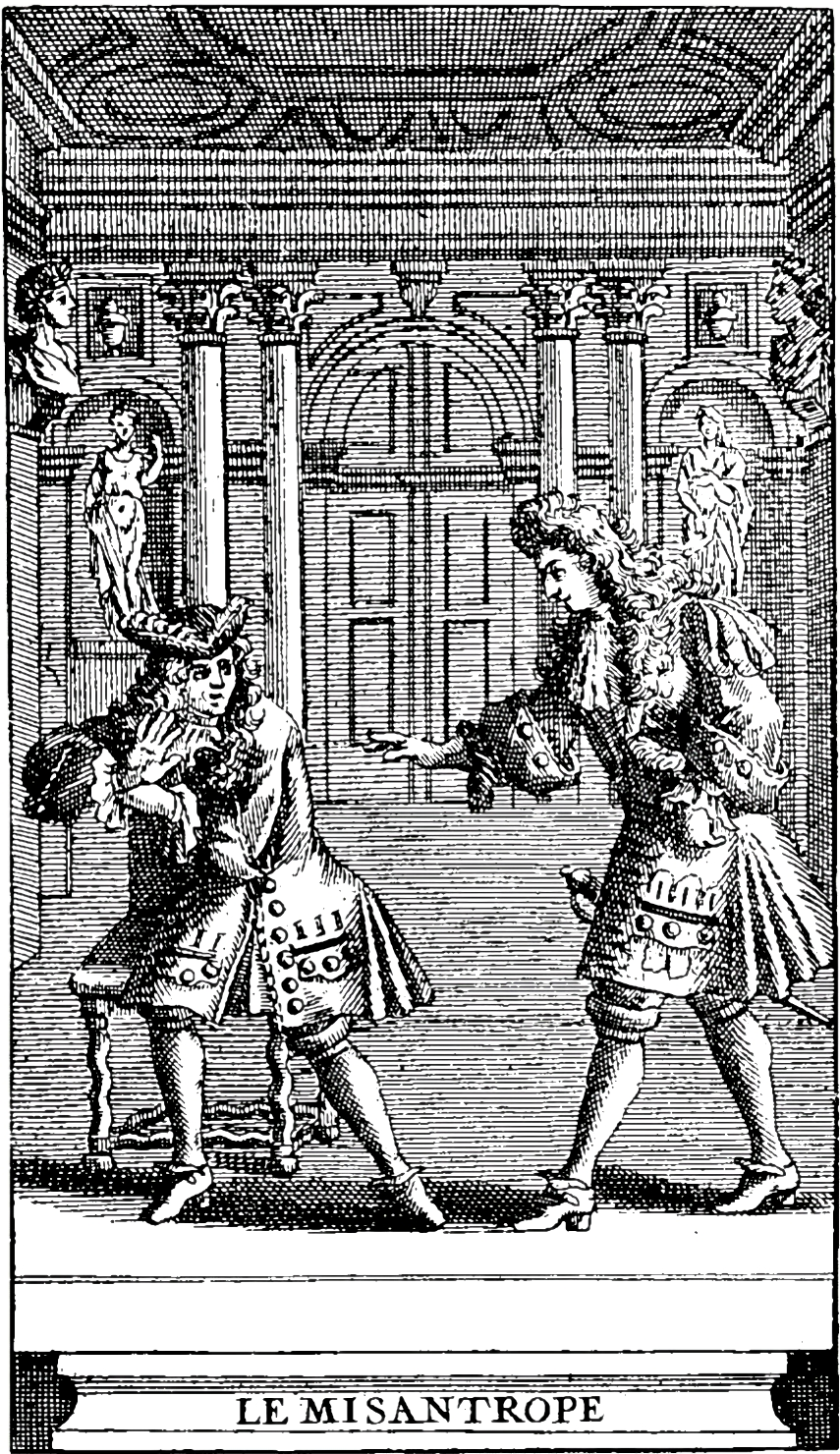
Engraving depicting the play Le Misanthrope by Molière

Misanthropy is the general hatred, dislike, or distrust of the human species, human behavior, or human nature. A misanthrope or misanthropist is someone who holds such views or feelings. Misanthropy involves a negative evaluative attitude toward humanity that is based on humankind's flaws. Misanthropes hold that these flaws characterize all or at least the greater majority of human beings. They claim that there is no easy way to rectify them short of a complete transformation of the dominant way of life. Various types of misanthropy are distinguished in the academic literature based on what attitude is involved, at whom it is directed, and how it is expressed. Either emotions or theoretical judgments can serve as the foundation of the attitude. It can be directed toward all humans without exception or exclude a few idealized people. In this regard, some misanthropes condemn themselves while others consider themselves superior to everyone else. Misanthropy is sometimes associated with a destructive outlook aiming to hurt other people or an attempt to flee society. Other types of misanthropic stances include activism by trying to improve humanity, quietism in the form of resignation, and humor mocking the absurdity of the human condition.

The negative misanthropic outlook is based on different types of human flaws. Moral flaws and unethical decisions are often seen as the foundational factor. They include cruelty, selfishness, injustice, greed, and indifference to the suffering of others. They may result in harm to humans and animals, such as genocides and factory farming of livestock. Other flaws include intellectual flaws, like dogmatism and cognitive biases, as well as aesthetic flaws concerning ugliness and lack of sensitivity to beauty. Many debates in the academic literature discuss whether misanthropy is a valid viewpoint and what its implications are. Proponents of misanthropy usually point to human flaws and the harm they have caused as a sufficient reason for condemning humanity. Critics have responded to this line of thought by claiming that severe flaws concern only a few extreme cases, but not humanity at large. Another objection is based on the claim that humans also have virtues besides their flaws and that a balanced evaluation might be overall positive. A further criticism rejects misanthropy because of its association with hatred, which may lead to violence, and because it may make people friendless and unhappy. Defenders of misanthropy have responded by claiming that this applies only to some forms of misanthropy but not to misanthropy in general.

A related issue concerns the question of the psychological and social factors that cause people to become misanthropes. They include socio-economic inequality, living under an authoritarian regime, and undergoing personal disappointments in life. Misanthropy is relevant in various disciplines. It has been discussed and exemplified by philosophers throughout history, like Heraclitus, Diogenes, Thomas Hobbes, Jean-Jacques Rousseau, Arthur Schopenhauer, and Friedrich Nietzsche. Misanthropic outlooks form part of some religious teachings discussing the deep flaws of human beings, like the Christian doctrine of original sin. Misanthropic perspectives and characters are also found in literature and popular culture. They include William Shakespeare's portrayal of Timon of Athens, Molière's play The Misanthrope, and Gulliver's Travels by Jonathan Swift. Misanthropy is closely related to but not identical to philosophical pessimism. Some misanthropes promote antinatalism, the view that humans should abstain from procreation.

== Definition ==
Misanthropy is traditionally defined as hatred or dislike of humankind. The word originated in the 17th century and has its roots in the Greek words μῖσος mīsos 'hatred' and ἄνθρωπος ānthropos 'man, human'. In contemporary philosophy, the term is usually understood in a wider sense as a negative evaluation of humanity as a whole based on humanity's vices and flaws. This negative evaluation can express itself in various forms, hatred being only one of them. In this sense, misanthropy has a cognitive component based on a negative assessment of humanity and is not just a blind rejection. Misanthropy is usually contrasted with philanthropy, which refers to the love of humankind and is linked to efforts to increase human well-being, for example, through good will, charitable aid, and donations. Both terms have a range of meanings and do not necessarily contradict each other. In this regard, the same person may be a misanthrope in one sense and a philanthrope in another sense.

One central aspect of all forms of misanthropy is that their target is not local but ubiquitous. This means that the negative attitude is not just directed at some individual persons or groups but at humanity as a whole. In this regard, misanthropy is different from other forms of negative discriminatory attitudes directed at a particular group of people. This distinguishes it from the intolerance exemplified by misogynists, misandrists, and racists, which hold a negative attitude toward women, men, or certain races. According to literature theorist Andrew Gibson, misanthropy does not need to be universal in the sense that a person literally dislikes every human being. Instead, it depends on the person's horizon. For instance, a villager who loathes every other villager without exception is a misanthrope if their horizon is limited to only this village.

Both misanthropes and their critics agree that negative features and failings are not equally distributed, i.e. that the vices and bad traits are exemplified much more strongly in some than in others. But for misanthropy, the negative assessment of humanity is not based on a few extreme and outstanding cases: it is a condemnation of humanity as a whole that is not just directed at exceptionally bad individuals but includes regular people as well. Because of this focus on the ordinary, it is sometimes held that these flaws are obvious and trivial but people may ignore them due to intellectual flaws. Some see the flaws as part of human nature as such. Others also base their view on non-essential flaws, i.e. what humanity has come to be. This includes flaws seen as symptoms of modern civilization in general. Nevertheless, both groups agree that the relevant flaws are "entrenched". This means that there is either no or no easy way to rectify them and nothing short of a complete transformation of the dominant way of life would be required if that is possible at all.

== Types ==
Various types of misanthropy are distinguished in the academic literature. They are based on what attitude is involved, how it is expressed, and whether the misanthropes include themselves in their negative assessment. The differences between them often matter for assessing the arguments for and against misanthropy. An early categorization suggested by Immanuel Kant distinguishes between positive and negative misanthropes. Positive misanthropes are active enemies of humanity. They wish harm to other people and undertake attempts to hurt them in one form or another. Negative misanthropy, by contrast, is a form of peaceful anthropophobia that leads people to isolate themselves. They may wish others well despite seeing serious flaws in them and prefer to not involve themselves in the social context of humanity. Kant associates negative misanthropy with moral disappointment due to previous negative experiences with others.

Another distinction focuses on whether the misanthropic condemnation of humanity is only directed at other people or at everyone including oneself. In this regard, self-inclusive misanthropes are consistent in their attitude by including themselves in their negative assessment. This type is contrasted with self-aggrandizing misanthropes, who either implicitly or explicitly exclude themselves from the general condemnation and see themselves instead as superior to everyone else. In this regard, it may be accompanied by an exaggerated sense of self-worth and self-importance. According to literature theorist Joseph Harris, the self-aggrandizing type is more common. He states that this outlook seems to undermine its own position by constituting a form of hypocrisy. A closely related categorization developed by Irving Babbitt distinguishes misanthropes based on whether they allow exceptions in their negative assessment. In this regard, misanthropes of the naked intellect regard humanity as a whole as hopeless. Tender misanthropes exclude a few idealized people from their negative evaluation. Babbitt cites Rousseau and his fondness for natural uncivilized man as an example of tender misanthropy and contrasts it with Jonathan Swift's thorough dismissal of all of humanity.

A further way to categorize forms of misanthropy is in relation to the type of attitude involved toward humanity. In this regard, philosopher Toby Svoboda distinguishes the attitudes of dislike, hate, contempt, and judgment. A misanthrope based on dislike harbors a distaste in the form of negative feelings toward other people. Misanthropy focusing on hatred involves an intense form of dislike. It includes the additional component of wishing ill upon others and at times trying to realize this wish. In the case of contempt, the attitude is not based on feelings and emotions but on a more theoretical outlook. It leads misanthropes to see other people as worthless and look down on them while excluding themselves from this assessment. If the misanthropic attitude has its foundation in judgment, it is also theoretical but does not distinguish between self and others. It is the view that humanity is in general bad without implying that the misanthrope is in any way better than the rest. According to Svoboda, only misanthropy based on judgment constitutes a serious philosophical position. He holds that misanthropy focusing on contempt is biased against other people while misanthropy in the form of dislike and hate is difficult to assess since these emotional attitudes often do not respond to objective evidence.

=== Misanthropic forms of life ===
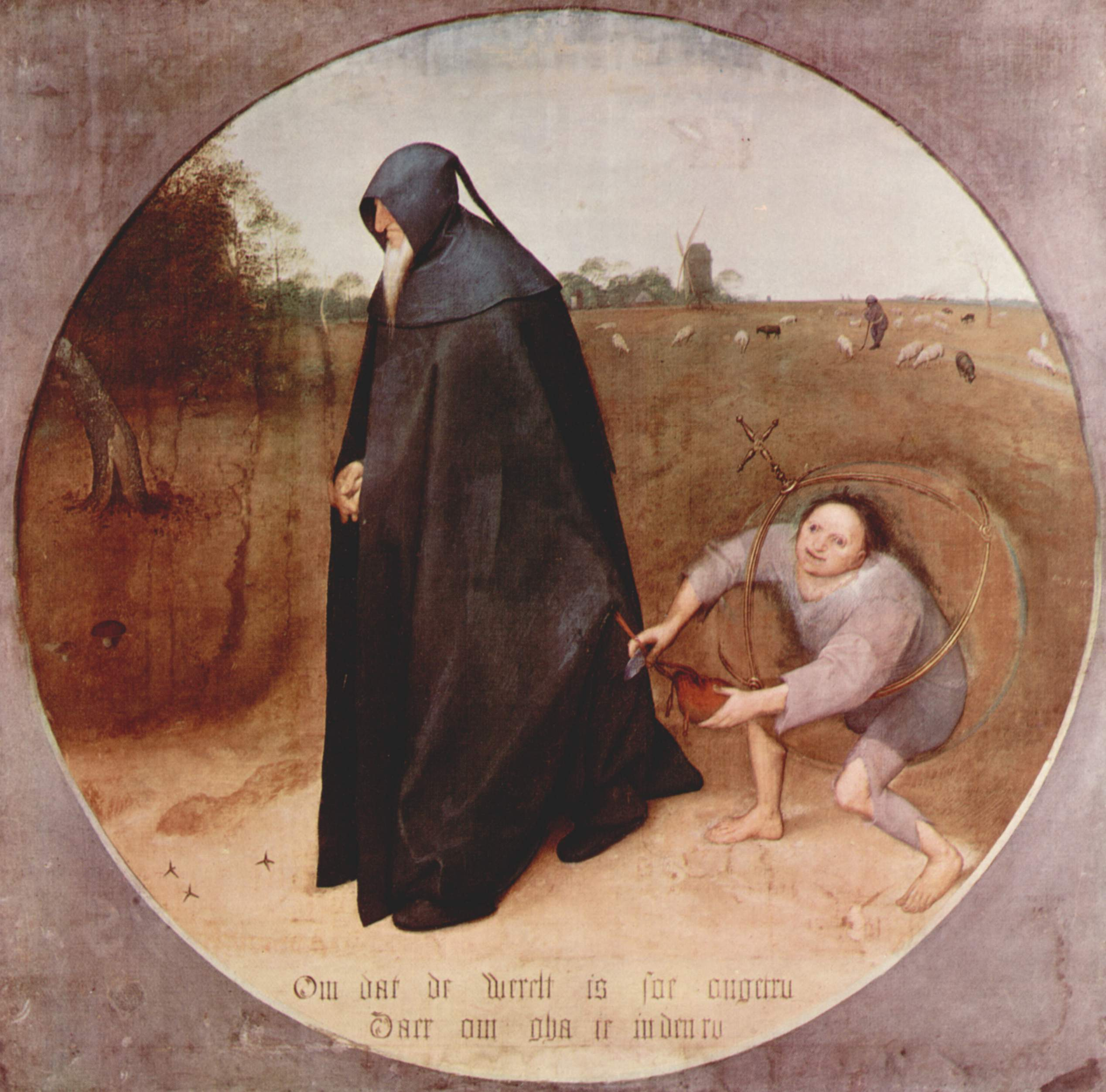
Misanthropy is often associated with the tendency to avoid social contacts, as portrayed in the painting The Misanthrope by Pieter Bruegel the Elder.

Misanthropy is usually not restricted to a theoretical opinion but involves an evaluative attitude that calls for a practical response. It can express itself in different forms of life. They come with different dominant emotions and practical consequences for how to lead one's life. These responses to misanthropy are sometimes presented through simplified archetypes that may be too crude to accurately capture the mental life of any single person. Instead, they aim to portray common attitudes among groups of misanthropes. The two responses most commonly linked to misanthropy involve either destruction or fleeing from society. The destructive misanthrope is said to be driven by a hatred of humankind and aims at tearing it down, with violence if necessary. For the fugitive misanthrope, fear is the dominant emotion and leads the misanthrope to seek a secluded place in order to avoid the corrupting contact with civilization and humanity as much as possible.

The contemporary misanthropic literature has also identified further less-known types of misanthropic lifestyles. The activist misanthrope is driven by hope despite their negative appraisal of humanity. This hope is a form of meliorism based on the idea that it is possible and feasible for humanity to transform itself and the activist tries to realize this ideal. A weaker version of this approach is to try to improve the world incrementally to avoid some of the worst outcomes without the hope of fully solving the basic problem. Activist misanthropes differ from quietist misanthropes, who take a pessimistic approach toward what the person can do for bringing about a transformation or significant improvements. In contrast to the more drastic reactions of the other responses mentioned, they resign themselves to quiet acceptance and small-scale avoidance. A further approach is focused on humor based on mockery and ridicule at the absurdity of the human condition. An example is that humans hurt each other and risk future self-destruction for trivial concerns like a marginal increase in profit. This way, humor can act both as a mirror to portray the terrible truth of the situation and as its palliative at the same time.

== Forms of human flaws ==
A core aspect of misanthropy is that its negative attitude toward humanity is based on human flaws. Various misanthropes have provided extensive lists of flaws, including cruelty, greed, selfishness, wastefulness, dogmatism, self-deception, and insensitivity to beauty. These flaws can be categorized in many ways. It is often held that moral flaws constitute the most serious case. Other flaws discussed in the contemporary literature include intellectual flaws, aesthetic flaws, and spiritual flaws.

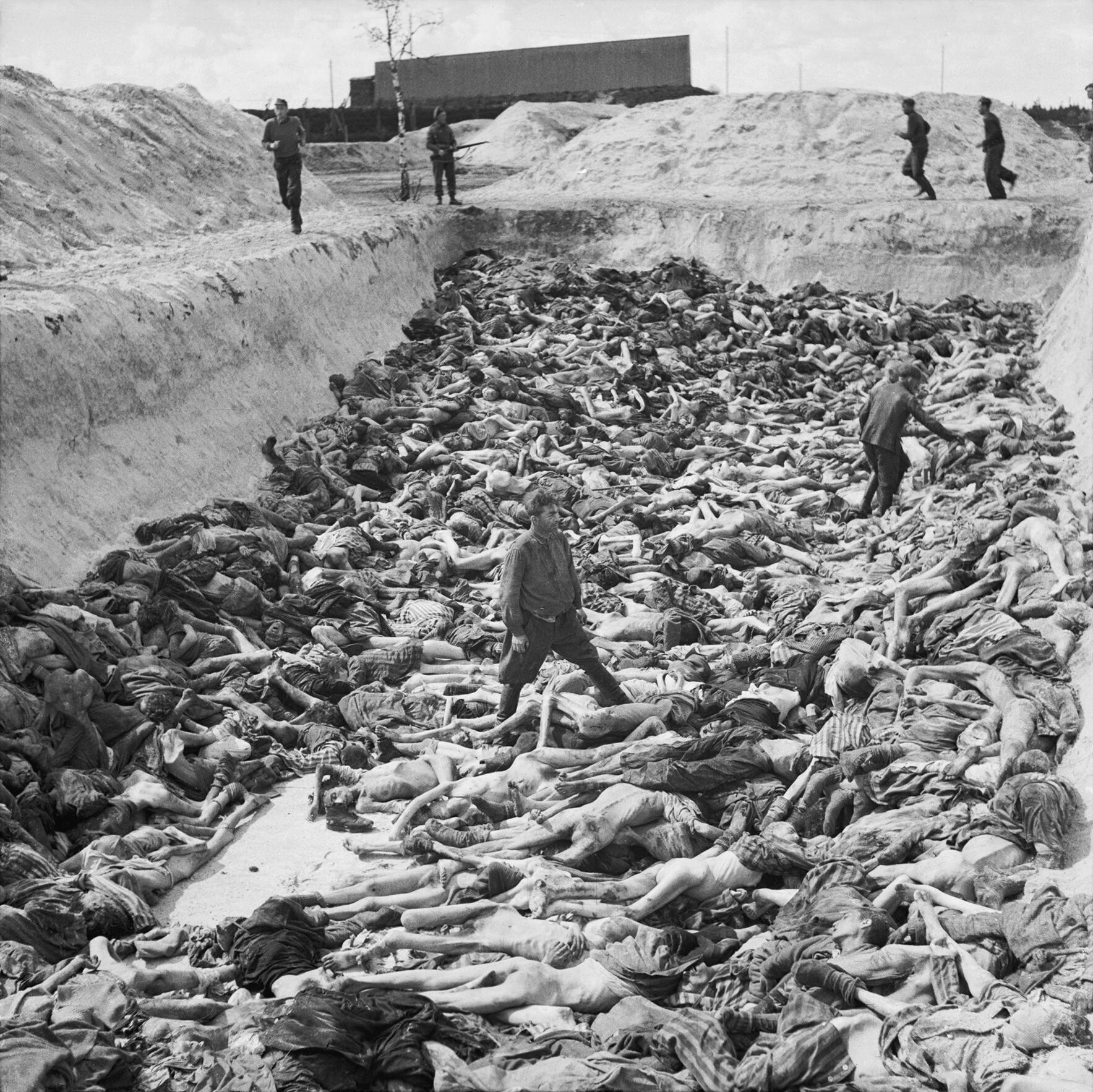
Moral flaws of human beings are exemplified in harm done to humans by other humans, like the mass killings during the Holocaust.

Moral flaws are usually understood as tendencies to violate moral norms or as mistaken attitudes toward what is the good. They include cruelty, indifference to the suffering of others, selfishness, moral laziness, cowardice, injustice, greed, and ingratitude. The harm done because of these flaws can be divided into three categories: harm done directly to humans, harm done directly to other animals, and harm done indirectly to both humans and other animals by harming the environment. Examples of these categories include the Holocaust, factory farming of livestock, and pollution causing climate change. In this regard, it is not just relevant that human beings cause these forms of harm but also that they are morally responsible for them. This is based on the idea that they can understand the consequences of their actions and could act differently. However, they decide not to, for example, because they ignore the long-term well-being of others in order to get short-term personal benefits.

Intellectual flaws concern cognitive capacities. They can be defined as what leads to false beliefs, what obstructs knowledge, or what violates the demands of rationality. They include intellectual vices, like arrogance, wishful thinking, and dogmatism. Further examples are stupidity, gullibility, and cognitive biases, like the confirmation bias, the self-serving bias, the hindsight bias, and the anchoring bias. Intellectual flaws can work in tandem with all kinds of vices: they may deceive someone about having a vice. This prevents the affected person from addressing it and improving themselves, for instance, by being mindless and failing to recognize it. They also include forms of self-deceit, wilful ignorance, and being in denial about something. Similar considerations have prompted some traditions to see intellectual failings, like ignorance, as the root of all evil.

Aesthetic flaws are usually not given the same importance as moral and intellectual flaws, but they also carry some weight for misanthropic considerations. These flaws relate to beauty and ugliness. They concern ugly aspects of human life itself, like defecation and aging. Other examples are ugliness caused by human activities, like pollution and litter, and inappropriate attitudes toward aesthetic aspects, like being insensitive to beauty.

== Causes ==
Various psychological and social factors have been identified in the academic literature as possible causes of misanthropic sentiments. The individual factors by themselves may not be able to fully explain misanthropy but can show instead how it becomes more likely. For example, disappointments and disillusionments in life can cause a person to adopt a misanthropic outlook. In this regard, the more idealistic and optimistic the person initially was, the stronger this reversal and the following negative outlook tend to be. This type of psychological explanation is found as early as Plato's Phaedo. In it, Socrates considers a person who trusts and admires someone without knowing them sufficiently well. He argues that misanthropy may arise if it is discovered later that the admired person has serious flaws. In this case, the initial attitude is reversed and universalized to apply to all others, leading to general distrust and contempt toward other humans. Socrates argues that this becomes more likely if the admired person is a close friend and if it happens more than once. This form of misanthropy may be accompanied by a feeling of moral superiority in which the misanthrope considers themselves to be better than everyone else.

Other types of negative personal experiences in life may have a similar effect. Andrew Gibson uses this line of thought to explain why some philosophers became misanthropes. He uses the example of Thomas Hobbes to explain how a politically unstable environment and the frequent wars can foster a misanthropic attitude. Regarding Arthur Schopenhauer, he states that being forced to flee one's home at an early age and never finding a place to call home afterward can have a similar effect. Another psychological factor concerns negative attitudes toward the human body, especially in the form of general revulsion from sexuality.

Besides the psychological causes, some wider social circumstances may also play a role. Generally speaking, the more negative the circumstances are, the more likely misanthropy becomes. For instance, according to political scientist Eric M. Uslaner, socio-economic inequality in the form of unfair distribution of wealth increases the tendency to adopt a misanthropic perspective. This has to do with the fact that inequality tends to undermine trust in the government and others. Uslaner suggests that it may be possible to overcome or reduce this source of misanthropy by implementing policies that build trust and promote a more equal distribution of wealth. The political regime is another relevant factor. This specifically concerns authoritarian regimes using all means available to repress their population and stay in power. For example, it has been argued that the severe forms of repression of the Ancien Régime in the late 17th century made it more likely for people to adopt a misanthropic outlook because their freedom was denied. Democracy may have the opposite effect since it allows more personal freedom due to its more optimistic outlook on human nature.

Empirical studies often use questions related to trust in other people to measure misanthropy. This concerns specifically whether the person believes that others would be fair and helpful. In an empirical study on misanthropy in American society, Tom W. Smith concludes that factors responsible for an increased misanthropic outlook are low socioeconomic status, being from racial and ethnic minorities, and having experienced recent negative events in one's life. In regard to religion, misanthropy is higher for people who do not attend church and for fundamentalists. Some factors seem to play no significant role, like gender, having undergone a divorce, and never having been married. Another study by Morris Rosenberg finds that misanthropy is linked to certain political outlooks. They include being skeptical about free speech and a tendency to support authoritarian policies. This concerns, for example, tendencies to suppress political and religious liberties.

== Arguments ==
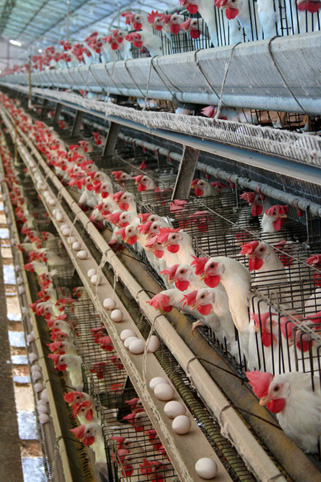
Misanthropes often focus on the harm done by humans to animals on a large scale, as in factory farming.

Various discussions in the academic literature concern the question of whether misanthropy is an accurate assessment of humanity and what the consequences of adopting it are. Many proponents of misanthropy focus on human flaws together with examples of when they exercise their negative influences. They argue that these flaws are so severe that misanthropy is an appropriate response.

Special importance in this regard is usually given to moral faults. This is based on the idea that humans do not merely cause a great deal of suffering and destruction but are also morally responsible for them. The reason is that they are intelligent enough to understand the consequences of their actions and could potentially make balanced long-term decisions instead of focusing on personal short-term gains.

Proponents of misanthropy sometimes focus on extreme individual manifestations of human flaws, like mass killings ordered by dictators. Others emphasize that the problem is not limited to a few cases, for example, that many ordinary people are complicit in their manifestation by supporting the political leaders committing them. A closely related argument is to claim that the underlying flaws are there in everyone, even if they reach their most extreme manifestation only in a few. Another approach is to focus not on the grand extreme cases but on the ordinary small-scale manifestations of human flaws in everyday life, such as lying, cheating, breaking promises, and being ungrateful.

Some arguments for misanthropy focus not only on general tendencies but on actual damage caused by humans in the past. This concerns, for instance, damages done to the ecosystem, like ecological catastrophes resulting in mass extinctions.

=== Criticism ===
Various theorists have criticized misanthropy. Some opponents acknowledge that there are extreme individual manifestations of human flaws, like mentally ill perpetrators, but claim that these cases do not reflect humanity at large and cannot justify the misanthropic attitude. For instance, while there are cases of extreme human brutality, like the mass killings committed by dictators and their forces, listing such cases is not sufficient for condemning humanity at large.

Some critics of misanthropy acknowledge that humans have various flaws but state that they present just one side of humanity while evaluative attitudes should take all sides into account. This line of thought is based on the idea that humans possess equally important virtues that make up for their shortcomings. For example, accounts that focus only on the great wars, cruelties, and tragedies in human history ignore its positive achievements in the sciences, arts, and humanities.

Another explanation given by critics is that the negative assessment should not be directed at humanity but at some social forces. These forces can include capitalism, communism, patriarchy, racism, religious fundamentalism, or imperialism. Supporters of this argument would adopt an opposition to one of these social forces rather than a misanthropic opposition to humanity.

Some objections to misanthropy are based not on whether this attitude appropriately reflects the negative value of humanity but on the costs of accepting such a position. The costs can affect both the individual misanthrope and the society at large. This is especially relevant if misanthropy is linked to hatred, which may turn easily into violence against social institutions and other humans and may result in harm. Misanthropy may also deprive the person of most pleasures by making them miserable and friendless.

Another form of criticism focuses more on the theoretical level and claims that misanthropy is an inconsistent and self-contradictory position. An example of this inconsistency is the misanthrope's tendency to denounce the social world while still being engaged in it and being unable to fully leave it behind. This criticism applies specifically to misanthropes who exclude themselves from the negative evaluation and look down on others with contempt from an arrogant position of inflated ego but it may not apply to all types of misanthropy. A closely related objection is based on the claim that misanthropy is an unnatural attitude and should therefore be seen as an aberration or a pathological case.

== In various disciplines ==
=== History of philosophy ===
Misanthropy has been discussed and exemplified by philosophers throughout history. One of the earliest cases was the pre-Socratic philosopher Heraclitus. He is often characterized as a solitary person who is not fond of social interactions with others. A central factor to his negative outlook on human beings was their lack of comprehension of the true nature of reality. This concerns especially cases in which they remain in a state of ignorance despite having received a thorough explanation of the issue in question. Another early discussion is found in Plato's Phaedo, where misanthropy is characterized as the result of frustrated expectations and excessively naïve optimism.

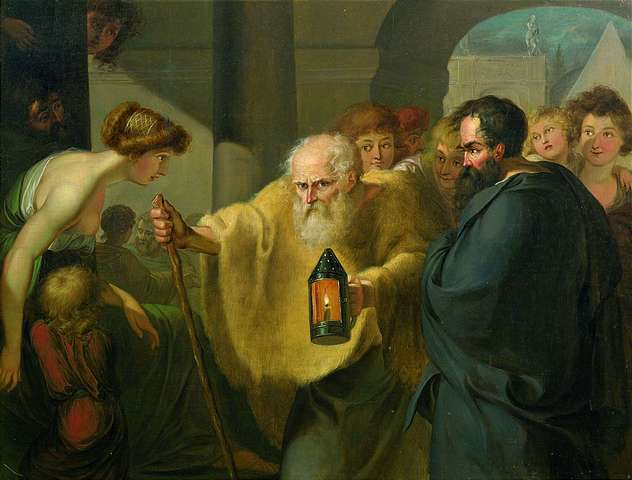
The cynic philosopher Diogenes had a negative image of the people around him and cared little for social conventions. For example, he used to walk around with a lamp in full daylight in his unsuccessful attempt to find a man he would consider honest or worthy.

Various reflections on misanthropy are also found in the cynic school of philosophy. There it is argued, for instance, that humans keep on reproducing and multiplying the evils they are attempting to flee. An example given by the first-century philosopher Dio Chrysostom is that humans move to cities to defend themselves against outsiders but this process thwarts their initial goal by leading to even more violence due to high crime rates within the city. Diogenes is a well-known cynic misanthrope. He saw other people as hypocritical and superficial. He openly rejected all kinds of societal norms and values, often provoking others by consciously breaking conventions and behaving rudely.

Thomas Hobbes is an example of misanthropy in early modern philosophy. His negative outlook on humanity is reflected in many of his works. For him, humans are egoistic and violent: they act according to their self-interest and are willing to pursue their goals at the expense of others. In their natural state, this leads to a never-ending war in which "every man to every man ... is an enemy". He saw the establishment of an authoritative state characterized by the strict enforcement of laws to maintain order as the only way to tame the violent human nature and avoid perpetual war.

A further type of misanthropy is found in Jean-Jacques Rousseau. He idealizes the harmony and simplicity found in nature and contrasts them with the confusion and disorder found in humanity, especially in the form of society and institutions. For instance, he claims that "Man is born free; and everywhere he is in chains". This negative outlook was also reflected in his lifestyle: he lived solitary and preferred to be with plants rather than humans.

Arthur Schopenhauer is often mentioned as a prime example of misanthropy. According to him, everything in the world, including humans and their activities, is an expression of one underlying will. This will is blind, which causes it to continuously engage in futile struggles. On the level of human life, this "presents itself as a continual deception" since it is driven by pointless desires. They are mostly egoistic and often result in injustice and suffering to others. Once they are satisfied, they only give rise to new pointless desires and more suffering. In this regard, Schopenhauer dismisses most things that are typically considered precious or meaningful in human life, like romantic love, individuality, and liberty. He holds that the best response to the human condition is a form of asceticism by denying the expression of the will. This is only found in rare humans and "the dull majority of men" does not live up to this ideal.

Friedrich Nietzsche, who was strongly influenced by Schopenhauer, is also often cited as an example of misanthropy. He saw man as a decadent and "sick animal" that shows no progress over other animals. He even expressed a negative attitude toward apes since they are more similar to human beings than other animals, for example, with regard to cruelty. For Nietzsche, a noteworthy flaw of human beings is their tendency to create and enforce systems of moral rules that favor weak people and suppress true greatness. He held that the human being is something to be overcome and used the term Übermensch to describe an ideal individual who has transcended traditional moral and societal norms.

=== Religion ===
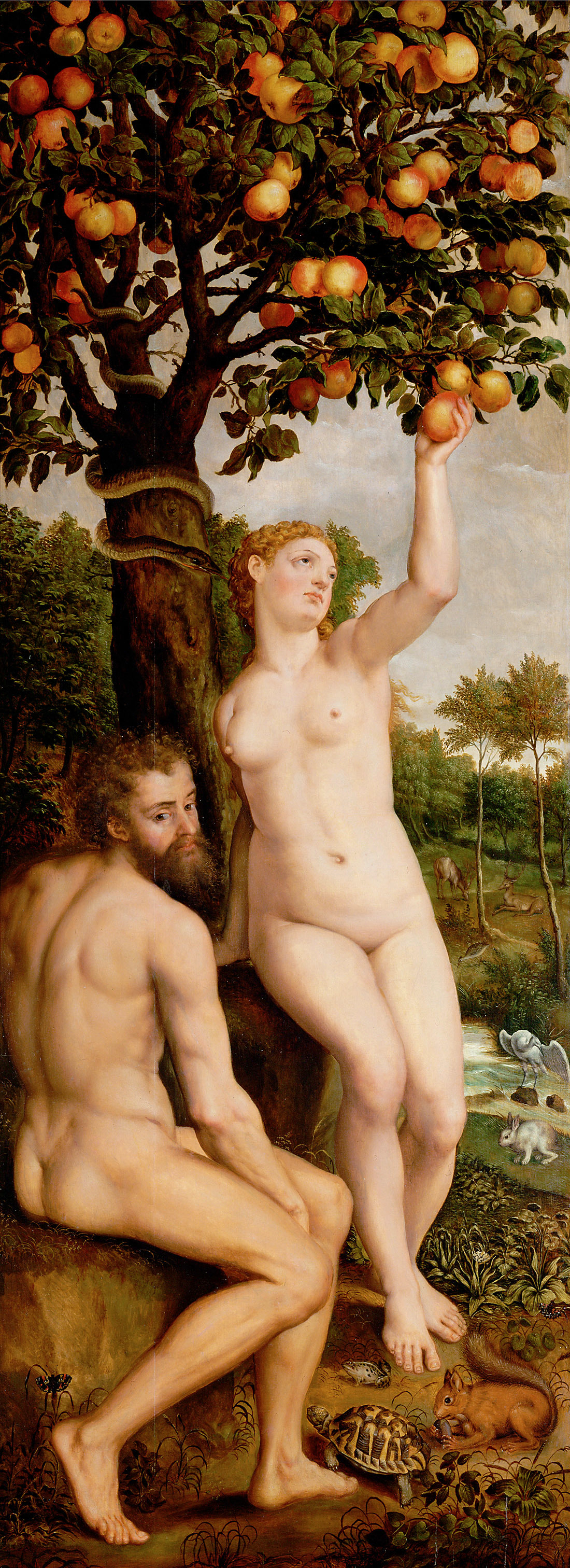
Focus on the sinful nature of human beings is one form of misanthropy. According to Christian doctrine, the original sin of Adam and Eve is responsible when they ate from the forbidden tree.

Some misanthropic views are also found in religious teachings. In Christianity, for instance, this is linked to the sinful nature of humans and the widespread manifestation of sin in everyday life. Common forms of sin are discussed in terms of the seven deadly sins. Examples are an excessive sense of self-importance in the form of pride and strong sexual cravings constituting lust. They also include the tendency to follow greed for material possessions as well as being envious of the possessions of others. According to the doctrine of original sin, this flaw is found in every human being since the doctrine states that human nature is already tainted by sin from birth by inheriting it from Adam and Eve's rebellion against God's authority. John Calvin's theology of total depravity has been described by some theologians as misanthropic.

Misanthropic perspectives can also be discerned in various Buddhist teachings. For example, Buddha had a negative outlook on the widespread flaws of human beings, including lust, hatred, delusion, sorrow, and despair. These flaws are identified with some form of craving or attachment (taṇhā) and cause suffering (dukkha). Buddhists hold that it is possible to overcome these failings in the process of achieving Buddhahood or enlightenment. However, this is seen as a difficult achievement, meaning that these failings apply to most human beings.

However, there are also many religious teachings opposed to misanthropy, such as the emphasis on kindness and helping others. In Christianity, this is found in the concept of agape, which involves selfless and unconditional love in the form of compassion and a willingness to help others. Buddhists see the practice of loving kindness (metta) as a central aspect that implies a positive intention of compassion and the expression of kindness toward all sentient beings.

=== Literature and popular culture ===
Many examples of misanthropy are also found in literature and popular culture. Timon of Athens by William Shakespeare is a famous portrayal of the life of the Ancient Greek Timon, who is widely known for his extreme misanthropic attitude. Shakespeare depicts him as a wealthy and generous gentleman. However, he becomes disillusioned with his ungrateful friends and humanity at large. This way, his initial philanthropy turns into an unrestrained hatred of humanity, which prompts him to leave society in order to live in a forest. Molière's play The Misanthrope is another famous example. Its protagonist, Alceste, has a low opinion of the people around him. He tends to focus on their flaws and openly criticizes them for their superficiality, insincerity, and hypocrisy. He rejects most social conventions and thereby often offends others, for example, by refusing to engage in social niceties like polite small talk.

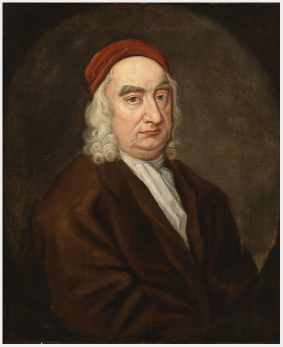
Jonathan Swift is well known for his often explicit pronouncements of misanthropy.

The author Jonathan Swift had a reputation for being misanthropic. In some statements, he openly declares that he hates and detests "that animal called man". Misanthropy is also found in many of his works. An example is Gulliver's Travels, which tells the adventures of the protagonist Gulliver, who journeys to various places, like an island inhabited by tiny people and a land ruled by intelligent horses. Through these experiences of the contrast between humans and other species, he comes to see more and more the deep flaws of humanity, leading him to develop a revulsion toward other human beings. Ebenezer Scrooge from Charles Dickens's A Christmas Carol is an often-cited example of misanthropy. He is described as a cold-hearted, solitary miser who detests Christmas. He is greedy, selfish, and has no regard for the well-being of others. Other writers associated with misanthropy include Gustave Flaubert and Philip Larkin.

The Joker from the DC Universe is an example of misanthropy in popular culture. He is one of the main antagonists of Batman and acts as an agent of chaos. He believes that people are selfish, cruel, irrational, and hypocritical. He is usually portrayed as a sociopath with a twisted sense of humor who uses violent means to expose and bring down organized society.

== Related concepts ==
=== Philosophical pessimism ===
Misanthropy is closely related but not identical to philosophical pessimism. Philosophical pessimism is the view that life is not worth living or that the world is a bad place, for example, because it is meaningless and full of suffering. This view is exemplified by Arthur Schopenhauer and Philipp Mainländer. Philosophical pessimism is often accompanied by misanthropy if the proponent holds that humanity is also bad and partially responsible for the negative value of the world. However, the two views do not require each other and can be held separately. A non-misanthropic pessimist may hold, for instance, that humans are just victims of a terrible world but not to blame for it. Eco-misanthropists, by contrast, may claim that the world and its nature are valuable but that humanity exerts a negative and destructive influence.

=== Antinatalism and human extinction ===
Humanity is a moral disaster. There would have been much less destruction had we never evolved. The fewer humans there are in the future, the less destruction there will still be.

— David Benatar, "The Misanthropic Argument for Anti-natalism"

Antinatalism is the view that coming into existence is bad and that humans have a duty to abstain from procreation. A central argument for antinatalism is called the misanthropic argument. It sees the deep flaws of humans and their tendency to cause harm as a reason for avoiding the creation of more humans. These harms include wars, genocides, factory farming, and damages done to the environment. This argument contrasts with philanthropic arguments, which focus on the future suffering of the human about to come into existence. They argue that the only way to avoid their future suffering is to prevent them from being born. The Voluntary Human Extinction Movement and the Church of Euthanasia are well-known examples of social movements in favor of antinatalism and human extinction.

Antinatalism is commonly endorsed by misanthropic thinkers. However, there are numerous other ways that could lead to the involuntary extinction of the human species, with various suggestions having been made about threats to the long-term survival of the human species, including nuclear wars, impact events, self-replicating nanorobots, artificial superintelligences or super-pathogens. While such cases can be seen as terrible scenarios for all life, misanthropes may instead interpret them as desirables and reasons for hope that the dominance of humanity in history will eventually come to an end. A similar sentiment is expressed by Bertrand Russell. He states in relation to the existence of human life on earth and its misdeeds that they are "a passing nightmare; in time the earth will become again incapable of supporting life, and peace will return."

=== Human exceptionalism and deep ecology ===
Human exceptionalism is the claim that human beings have unique importance and are exceptional compared to all other species. It is often based on the claim that they stand out because of their special capacities, like intelligence, rationality, and autonomy. In religious contexts, it is frequently explained in relation to a unique role that God foresaw for them or that they were created in God's image. Human exceptionalism is usually combined with the claim that human well-being matters more than the well-being of other species. This line of thought can be used to draw various ethical conclusions. One is the claim that humans have the right to rule the planet and impose their will on other species. Another is that inflicting harm on other species may be morally acceptable if it is done with the purpose of promoting human well-being and excellence.

Generally speaking, the position of human exceptionalism is at odds with misanthropy in relation to the value of humanity. But this is not necessarily the case and it may be possible to hold both positions at the same time. One way to do this is to claim that humanity is exceptional because of a few rare individuals but that the average person is bad. Another approach is to hold that human beings are exceptional in a negative sense: given their destructive and harmful history, they are much worse than any other species and their own existence is a damage for the Earth itself.

Theorists in the field of deep ecology are also often critical of human exceptionalism and tend to favor a misanthropic perspective. Deep ecology is a philosophical and social movement that stresses the inherent value of nature and advocates a radical change in human behavior toward nature. Various theorists have criticized deep ecology based on the claim that it is misanthropic by privileging other species over humans. For example, the deep ecology movement Earth First! faced severe criticism when they praised the AIDS epidemic in Africa as a solution to the problem of human overpopulation in their newsletter.

== See also ==
- Asociality – lack of motivation to engage in social interaction
- Antihumanism – rejection of humanism
- Antisocial personality disorder - personality disorder characterized by disregarding others
- Cosmicism - literary philosophy created by H. P. Lovecraft described as believing in no god and that humans are "particularly insignificant"
- Emotional isolation - isolation state where one feels separated from others emotionally despite knowing many people
- Hatred (video game) - 2015 video game with a misanthropic main character on a "genocide crusade"
- Nihilism - belief system that life, knowledge, and values are all irrelevant and meaningless
- Social alienation - one's feeling of being disconnected with a group of people
