= Performance Writing =

Performance Writing was pioneered at Dartington College of Arts in Devon, UK as a radical new approach to writing. It is a multi-modal approach which explores through artistic practice how writing interacts with other art forms and practices — visual art, sound art, time-based media, installation, electronic literature, bookworks, and performance art.

== History ==
Performance Writing was inaugurated as a Bachelor of Arts undergraduate course at Dartington College of Arts in 1994. The course was written, and the field developed, by a number of self-described Performance Writers and academics including John Hall, Ric Allsopp, Caroline Bergvall, Aaron Williamson, Brigid Mc Leer, Alaric Sumner, Redell Olsen, cris cheek, Peter Jaeger, Barbara Bridger, Melanie Thompson, Jerome Fletcher, and many others, and enriched by a program of visiting artists from around the world. The external examiners for the BA and MA programmes were Allen Fisher, Rod Mengham and Robert Gavin Hampson.

As a result of the merger of DCA and University College Falmouth ( now Falmouth University in 2010, the undergraduate Performance Writing course was relocated to a new performance centre at Tremough Campus (now Penryn Campus) near Penryn, Cornwall. The course ceased taking applications for new students from 2010 onwards pending a reconfiguration of its Performance Writing courses. Recruitment has not resumed.

The Falmouth University post-graduate Master of Arts course in Performance Writing led by Associate Professor of Performance Writing Jerome Fletcher ran for two years at the Arnolfini in Bristol. Recruitment to the MA Performance Writing was ceased in 2012. Performance Writing continues at the postgraduate and research level at Falmouth University.

Performance Writing has been adopted and adapted by both independent and academic researchers, practitioners, pedagogs, and institutions in Oakland, California and The Banff Centre in Canada. In the UK, Performance Writing methodologies and sensibilities have spread – primarily through graduates of the program at Dartington – into a rich diversity of artistic forms and institutional formulations.

== Development of definition ==
As an emerging field, its definition and limits are the subject of ongoing debate. John Hall's lecture Thirteen Ways of Talking about Performance Writing explores definition as a process, using playful and precise language to establish the complexity of reflexive descriptions: a performance of writing about writing as such.

At the symposium launching the field, Performance Writing was described by Caroline Bergvall as exploring "relationships between textual and text-based work when developed in conjunction with other media and discourses," and opening "the investigation of formal and ideological strategies which writers and artists develop textually in response or in reaction to their own time and their own fields"

She also understood it as "not primarily [a] unified academic discipline [or] one delineated, hybridic artform", but rather as an "area of joint practical and critical investigation of the many uses writing and language are being put to and push themselves into."

== Events ==
Performance Writing events so far include two symposia; one at Dartington College of Arts in 1996 and a second at the Theatre School in Utrecht in 1999.

In May 2010 Bristol's Arnolfini, in collaboration with University College Falmouth, held PW10: a weekend of Performance Writing themed talks, readings, and artistic works exploring interdisciplinary approaches to language and textuality. It was timed to coincide with the exhibition Say: "Parsley" by Performance Writing co-founder Caroline Bergvall and Ciaran Maher. It included works by Allen Fisher, Drew Milne, David Prior (artist), Jason Nelson, J.R. Carpenter. In May 2012 PW12 was held at Arnolfini.
