= Sophie Robinson =

Sophie Robinson may refer to:

- Sophie Robinson (poet) (born 1985), English poet and teacher
- Sophie Robinson (designer) (fl. 2000–present), British interior stylist, designer and journalist
