= Alembic (magazine) =

London Poetry Magazine

Alembic was a poetry magazine established by Peter Barry, Ken Edwards, and Robert Gavin Hampson, which appeared eight times during the 1970s. It existed between 1973 and 1978. The magazine was based in London.

== History and profile ==
The first issue appeared in 1973: it was a collection of poems by Barry, Edwards, Hampson and Jim Stewart with graphic work by John Simpson, Robert Snell and Sibani Raychaudhuri. The work was printed on different colours and sizes of paper - and contained in a plastic bag. It was sold at the Edinburgh Festival of 1973, where Hampson was working with the Liverpool-based multimedia group Zoom Cortex. (See Adrian Henri, Events and Happenings, Thames and Hudson, for Zoom Cortex.)The second issue maintained the same format (a collection of loose pages in a plastic bag) but with an increased number of poets. Richard Kostelanetz's assemblages have been described by the editors as their model for this mode of publication. With the third issue, the magazine adopted the standard little-magazine format of the time: A4 pages, card cover, stapled. Alembic 3, 4 and 5 also marked a more self-conscious engagement with contemporary London-based experimental poetry. Alembic 3 (Spring 1975) announced the intention to engage with 'one area of contemporary creative practice' in each issue in order to represent the range of poetry being written in the UK. This issue focused on contemporary work that had its roots in surrealism. It included Lee Harwood's essay 'Surrealist Poetry Today', which had been a talk given at the Poetry Society, and it included work by Harwood, Paul Matthews, Jeff Nuttall, Heathcote Williams and others. Alembic 4 was edited solely by Hampson and was dedicated to open field poetry and the idea of place. Allen Fisher was the featured poet: in addition to work by him, there was also an interview with him conducted by Barry and Edwards. This issue also included work by Roy Fisher, Eric Mottram, and a small number of American poets, including Alan Davies, who was to be associated with LANGUAGE poetry. Alembic 5 (Autumn 1976)was edited solely by Edwards and focused on experimental prose, including work by Paul Buck, Opal Nations, Jeff Nuttall, Maxim Jakubowski, David Miller, the Canadian writer Greg Hollingshead and James Sherry, who was also associated with LANGUAGE poetry. This issue was also the first to be offset. (Like Alembic 4. it had a wrap around cover rather than card.) Alembic 6 (Summer 1977)was again solely edited by Hampson. It included further work by contributors to earlier issues. The featured poet was the Australian poet David Miller: as well as poems and essays by Miller, there was also poetry by Robert Lax and a reprint of work by Charles Madge, on both of whom Miller had written. In addition, there was also work by Rosmarie Waldrop, Tom Leonard, Elaine Randell and Barry MacSweeney. Alembic 7 (Spring 1978), edited by Edwards and Hampson out of Lower Green Farm, was the 'Assemblage Issue', assembled by inviting a range of poets and visual artists to provide the contents. It included work by Jeremy Adler, Paul Buck, Herbert Burke, Paula Claire, cris cheek, Bob Cobbing, Glenda George, Robert Sheppard, E. E. Vonna-Michel, Lawrence Upton and others. A particular feature of this issue was that every cover was different: they were hand-printed by Vonna-Michel with a rubber-stamp used for the title. Alembic 9 (to be edited by Hampson) was promised, but never appeared: Edwards had begun to publish Reality Studios as a slimmer, faster and more frequent publication. This eventually metamorphosed (through an amalgamation with Wendy Mulford's Street Editions) into Reality Street, which has been a major publisher of experimental poetry and prose since the 1980s.

An interview with Hampson and Edwards by Sophie Seita, originally published in mimeo, is included in Jacket2 as 'the transatlantic axis of alembic'.

== Sources ==
- David Miller and Richard Price, British Poetry Magazines 1914-2000, The British Library/ Oak knoll Publications, 2006.
- Wolfgang Gortschacher, Little Magazine Profiles: The Little Magazines in Great Britain 1939-1993, University of Salzburg, 1993.
- Wolfgang Gortschacher, Contemporary Views on the Little Magazine, Poetry Salzburg, 2000.
