= Kristen McMenamy =

American model (born 1964)

- Born: December 13, 1964 (age 61)
- Occupations: Model, actress
- Years active: 1984–present
- Spouses: Miles Aldridge (m. 1997–2013) Ivor Braka (m. 2016)
- Children: 4, including Lily McMenamy
- Modeling information
- Height: 5 ft 10 in (1.78 m)
- Hair color: White
- Eye color: Blue
- Agency: The Lions (New York); IMG Models (London)

Kristen McMenamy (born December 13, 1964) is an American model known for her unconventional and androgynous appearance. Originally a long-haired redhead, she reinvented her look in the early 1990s by having her hair cut short and dyed black, and her eyebrows shaved off. Her career was boosted by the advent of the grunge fashion trend.

== Early life and education ==
McMenamy was born in Easton, Pennsylvania, on December 13, 1964. She also spent part of her youth in Buffalo, New York. She was the third of seven children in an Irish-American Catholic family.

McMenamy attended Notre Dame High School in Easton, where she reportedly received excellent grades but was often teased by her classmates, who called her "Skeleton" due to her lanky body. While in college, she decided to drop out of school to pursue a career in modeling.

== Career ==
Following high school, McMenamy moved from Easton to New York City to pursue a career as a model. She was initially rejected by various agencies. In 2012, she recounted, "I got rejected by everyone. But I was obsessed! It was the only thing I wanted to do and I wanted it so badly. I was like a bulldog, hanging on by my teeth."

She met modeling agent Eileen Ford, who advised her to get plastic surgery. Despite not undergoing plastic surgery, she was signed by a modeling agency that sent her to work in Paris. A few years later, she was signed by Elite Model Management, and subsequently by Ford Models.

McMenamy's modeling career mainly spanned the years 1985 to 1998, when she worked for several of the world's top designers and international fashion houses, including Versace, Giorgio Armani, Valentino, Todd Oldham, Christian Dior, Sonia Rykiel, Dolce & Gabbana, Jean Paul Gaultier, Gianfranco Ferré, Lanvin, Isaac Mizrahi, Yohji Yamamoto, Thierry Mugler, Comme des Garçons, Chloé, and Moschino.

During the beginning of her modeling career, McMenamy met photographer Peter Lindbergh, with whom she worked extensively, and Chanel head designer Karl Lagerfeld, who helped mentor her. One of her first fashion campaigns was for Chanel's Spring/Summer 1985 haute couture collection. The same year, she was photographed by Lindbergh for a Jil Sander ad campaign, and she also starred in an ad campaign for the Byblos fashion house. In 1986, she was featured in the book A Day in the Life of America, photographed by Sante D'Orazio, and also appeared in advertisements for Gerard Darel and Alberta Ferretti.

She worked with several fashion photographers, including Albert Watson, Helmut Newton, Richard Avedon, Steven Meisel, Ellen von Unwerth, Arthur Elgort, Paolo Roversi, Patrick Demarchelier, Jean-Baptiste Mondino, Tim Walker, David Sims, Max Vadukul, and Juergen Teller. Teller described her as "the best model I have ever worked with".

In 1991, McMenamy starred in the ad campaign for Claude Montana's spring/summer collection, and was paired with model Claudia Mason for Fendi's fall/winter ad campaign. It has been said of McMenamy that "At the time of supermodels, she was the first eccentric and unusual beauty to fight her way through a host of classically beautiful women, thus appearing on the covers of Vogue and on other famous magazines." Some of the other magazines that she has been featured in are Harper's Bazaar, Vanity Fair, People, Interview, Elle, V, Dazed & Confused, LOVE, i-D, The Face, W, Women's Wear Daily, and Newsweek.

McMenamy was known for having an over-the-top manner of walking on the catwalk, and was likened to "a vamp, stopping to strike exaggerated poses". In 1992, after having her long red hair cut short and dyed black, makeup artist François Nars shaved off her eyebrows for Anna Sui's fall/winter fashion show, thereby "ushering in the era of grunge". The transformation of McMenamy's look made her famous, and her career took off. From that point on, her image became associated with androgyny, and she was also considered a gamine.

In October 1992, she opened the Versace spring/summer 1993 womenswear fashion show, and she later appeared in the ad campaign for that collection, photographed by Avedon. In December 1992, she starred in a grunge photo spread for Vogue titled "Grunge & Glory", photographed by Meisel. Harper's Bazaar named her "Model of the Year" in January 1993. The following month, she had six red ribbons painted on her back, for an amfAR benefit event that she co-hosted with Leanza Cornett. McMenamy also fronted advertisements for Calvin Klein that year.

In October 1994, she was one several models on the cover of Vogue Italia's 30th anniversary issue. The following year, she closed the Versace spring/summer Haute couture show wearing a bridal gown. She then starred in the ad campaign for that collection along with model Nadja Auermann and Elton John, photographed by Avedon. McMenamy and John later appeared together on the cover of the April 1995 issue of Interview. That same month, she was on the cover of Vogue. She was also featured in a chapter of the 1995 book The Beauty Trip.

The following year, McMenamy was the star of an Absolut Vodka fashion campaign that was photographed by Newton in Sweden. Also in 1996, she posed nude with the word "Versace" written on her breasts and buttocks for a series of pictures that were photographed by Teller, which were published in the German magazine Süddeutsche Zeitung Magazin. In addition, she appeared in that year's Pirelli Calendar, photographed by Lindbergh. She was also one of the ten subjects of Lindbergh's 1996 book 10 Women.

McMenamy was sometimes compared to supermodel Linda Evangelista because of certain similarities that they shared. Both of their careers skyrocketed after they dramatically changed their looks, and later, they both were considered "chameleons". They both were muses to Lagerfeld and Gianni Versace, as well as to Lindbergh and Meisel, with whom they often collaborated. In spite of their similarities, there were rumors that they didn't get along. They did, however, appear together in several magazine photo spreads and in two ad campaigns for Versace.

In 1997, McMenamy appeared in advertisements for the fall/winter collections of both Versace and Armani. She was also featured in the book Fashion: Photography of the Nineties, in a series of pictures that were photographed by Teller. She then chose to step away from the modeling world in 1998 to focus on her family.

In 2004, McMenamy made a return to modeling by walking the runway for the Prada fashion house. That same year, she chose to stop dyeing her hair, and instead let it go gray. The next year, McMenamy was booked by Marc Jacobs for his fall/winter 2005 campaign. In 2006, she appeared on the cover of the book In Vogue: The Illustrated History of the World's Most Famous Fashion Magazine along with Evangelista, photographed by Meisel. Then, in 2009, she was on the cover of the July issue of Vogue Italia, and the cover story had the words "McMenamy the Legend" as the heading. In the September 2009 issue of Harper's Bazaar, she wore no makeup for a feature story titled "Supermodels Supernatural". She also appeared in advertisements for Lanvin's fall/winter collection.

The following year, McMenamy modeled for the fall/winter 2010 Viktor & Rolf fashion show, in which she was a "Matryoshka doll", where the designers put several layers of clothing on her, similar to how the dolls have several layers. She also walked the runway for Klein's fall/winter 2010 fashion show. In August 2010, McMenamy appeared on the cover of Vogue Italia. The cover image and the accompanying 24-page photo spread, which was titled "Water & Oil", were said to be inspired by that year's Deepwater Horizon oil spill in the Gulf of Mexico. A controversy arose over the photo spread, particularly because in some of the pictures, McMenamy seemed to be emulating a bird covered in oil. Though, according to Franca Sozzani, Vogue Italia's editor-in-chief, the message of the photo spread was "to be careful about nature".

In September 2010, McMenamy starred in a short fashion film for Gareth Pugh's spring/summer 2011 collection. A few days later, she closed the Louis Vuitton spring/summer 2011 fashion show wearing body paint that was intended to look like zebra stripes. In January 2011, she closed the Chanel Haute couture spring/summer fashion show. She also starred in the 2011 short film The Tale of a Fairy, which was directed by Lagerfeld. She later made an appearance at the Cannes film festival, where she attended a gala for amfAR.

McMenamy appeared in the fall/winter 2011 ad campaigns for both Givenchy and Gaultier. Then, in 2012, she was in the ad campaign for Roberto Cavalli's spring/summer collection. In 2013, she walked the runway for Atelier Versace's spring/summer fashion show. Months later, she was the star of the fall/winter ad campaign for Balenciaga. In October 2018, McMenamy opened the Valentino spring/summer 2019 fashion show. In 2021, McMenamy appeared in the Gucci Aria fall/winter campaign, photographed by Mert and Marcus. In September 2021, McMenamy opened the "Fendace" fashion show, which was a collaboration between Fendi and Versace. McMenamy was the cover model for the January 2022 issue of British Vogue, photographed by Meisel. That same month, McMenamy opened the Valentino spring/summer 2022 haute couture show.

In July 2022, while closing the Gaultier fall/winter 2022 haute couture fashion show wearing a bridal gown, McMenamy tripped on her high heels and fell on the catwalk, with several audience members rushing to her aid. The incident was widely reported in the media and prompted several specific articles.

In January 2023, she fell on the catwalk once again, while walking in the Valentino spring/summer 2023 haute couture fashion show. She wound up removing both her shoes and finishing her walk barefoot. The video went viral on social media and the incident was widely reported in the press. Several people reportedly "criticised the Italian luxury fashion house for showcasing shoes that appeared too difficult to walk in", which prompted McMenamy to post on her Instagram page that she did not fall because of her heels or the outfit, but blamed herself for the mishap. In September 2023, McMenamy was a guest celebrity judge on the British reality television series RuPaul's Drag Race UK broadcast on BBC Three.

== Personal life ==
In the early 1990s, McMenamy became romantically involved with Hubert Boukobza, the owner of the Paris nightclub Les Bains-Douches. In 1994, they had a daughter, model Lily McMenamy. The relationship came to an end, and later, McMenamy began dating English fashion photographer Miles Aldridge, whom she met on a photoshoot for W magazine. They were married in 1997. Her wedding dress was designed by Karl Lagerfeld, who gave her away, and she wore a headdress made by the milliner Philip Treacy. Naomi Campbell served as one of the bridesmaids. McMenamy and Aldridge have a daughter and two sons.

After 16 years of marriage, McMenamy filed for divorce in April 2013. That same year, she began dating art dealer Ivor Braka. In June 2016, McMenamy and Braka were married.
