= Redell Olsen =

British poet (born 1971)

Redell Olsen FEA (born in 1971) is a British poet, performance artist, film-maker and academic. Her work incorporates traditional books and other kinds of book works, alongside images, texts for performance, films, and site specific work. Olsen describes her work as involving avant-garde modernist and contemporary poetics, feminist theory and writing practice, Language Writing, ecology and environmental literatures, and performance.

== Life and work ==
ACADEMIC CAREER

Olsen studied English literature at Cambridge University before subsequently completing an MA in Fine Art. She completed her PhD on 'Contemporary Poetics and Innovative Women's Writing' at Royal Holloway, University of London, in 2002, and went on to teach on the Performance Writing programme at Dartington University alongside Caroline Bergvall. She subsequently moved to a Lectureship at Royal Holloway, University of London, where she is now Professor in Poetry and Poetics, teaching undergraduate English Students and postgraduate Creative Writing students. With Robert Gavin Hampson, she founded and ran the MA in Poetic Practice at Royal Holloway from 2003-13. Starting in 2014 this was absorbed into the MA Creative Writing programme as the Poetic Practice Pathway (alongside the existing Poetry and Fiction pathways). The courses on this pathway were taught for many years by Olsen, Hampson, and Will Montgomery; it is now taught mainly by Olsen. She is also currently the Director of the Poetics Research Centre at Royal Holloway. (For some years she combined this with the post of co-director of the Living Sustainably Catalyst.)

AWARDS

Olsen was the Judith E. Wilson Fellow at the University of Cambridge from 2013-14. During this period she produced 'Whiteout Film for Snowgoggles' as part of the Polar Muse project at the Scott Polar Research institute in Cambridge. In 2018, her poetic film essay 'Now Circa (1918)' was shortlisted for the AHRC Research in Film Award. It was chosen to open the Tolpuddle Radical Film Festival (2018). More recently, she was the winner of the 2020-21 DARE Art Prize. This was awarded by the University of Leeds and Opera North in association with the National Science and Media Museum and The Tetley, Leeds for the creation of a film and a song cycle, using and responding to scientific data measuring different species of insects in the UK skies. This practice-based research will contribute to the inter-disciplinary research into climate change and species extinction of the University of Leeds BIODAR unit. She was elected a Fellow of the English Association in 2020.

WORK

Olsen's early work includes 'Book of the Insect' (allsingingalldancing, 1999) and 'Book of the Fur' (rempress, 2000). In 2004, she and the book-artist Susan Johanknecht published here are my instructions (Gefn Press), the outcome of their collaborative project 'writing instructions / reading walls', which had involved inviting 9 artists/writers to present them with instructions for a work to be sited on the cafe wall at the Poetry Society, London. These works were exhibited serially over the period January to May 2003. Olsen and Johanknecht then sent their own instructions to the 9 participants in response to the work produced. Here are my instructions includes this second response together with visual material relating to the work produced in response to the first set on instructions. It also included a foreword by the two editors and a poem by Olsen, 'we await your instructions nervously'.

In 2004, Olsen also published secure portable space (Reality Street). This included four sequences: 'Corrupted by Showgirls'; Spill-Kit; Era of Heroes; and The Minimaus Poems - her response to Charles Olson's Maximus. David Kennedy and Christine Kennedy, in their book, women's experimental poetry in britain 1970 to 2010 (2013), described 'Corrupted by Showgirls' as 'a gender-politics savvy critique of the representation of women in musicals and film noir' (143). They noted, in particular, how the sequence picks up on 'film's reliance on close-ups of small, but telling, physical gestures for its most powerful emotional effects' (143). Their suggestion that 'Era of heroes / Heroes of Error' shows Olsen's interest in 'public language and public space' (143) is developed more fully by Zoe Skoulding in her monograph Contemporary Women's Poetry & Urban Space (2013). Skoulding discusses how Olsen's 'The Minimaus Poems' read 'the spatial environment of the city' against 'the textual background of Charles Olson's The Maximus Poems' (179). Rather than being a simple play on the similar surnames, carried over into an ironic juxtaposition of Gloucester, England, and Gloucester, Massachusetts, Olsen's text sets up 'a complex interplay in which location and gender shift within multiple ironies' (180): Olsen's text works to disrupt 'any certainty' by creating 'a double map in which competing views multiply subject positions, disturbing the relationship with the background text by foregrounding particular elements of it' (181). Olsen complicates this further by reworking the American Gloucester through the writings of the Gloucester-born composer and First World War poet, Ivor Gurney (Olsen, 2004). In addition, Olsen's subject is enmeshed in the environment created by contemporary technological communication systems (181). Skoulding also discusses Olsen's neon-light version of 'Era of Heroes / Heroes of Error', displayed in the bookart bookshop in Old Street, London, where the flickering of the light repeatedly collapsed the words 'Era of Heroes' into 'Heroes of Error'as 'a challenge to the notion of the hero in a time of war'. The long alphabetical list of superheroes, 'perhaps reminiscent of the reading out of the names of the dead', which Olsen read to accompany the exhibition, Skoulding suggests,'quotes popular culture while drawing attention to the arbitrary construction of notions of heroism' (183).Olsen's work is discussed (alongside that of Barbara Guest and Veronica Forrest-Thomson) in Ella O'Keefe's 2019 PhD from Deakin University, Australia.

Two of Olsen's most important formative volumes were published in the USA. In 2012, she published Punk Faun: A Bar Rock Pastel (Oakland, CA: Subpress), and, in 2014, she published film poems (Los Angeles: Les Figues). Film poems brought together 5 sequences: London Land Marks; A Newe Book of Copyes; Bucolic Picnic; The Lost Pool; and SPRIGS & spots. All five were originally written in conjunction with films made or re-made by Olsen, as Drew Milne points out in his foreword. An account of the making and performance of 'The Lost Pool' is contained in Robert Hampson's essay, 'Lost and Found: Women's Poetry and the Academy' (Journal of British and Irish Innovative Poetry, 3:2, September 2011, 81-90). Sophie Mayer discusses Olsen's film poems in 'Cinema Mon Amour: How British Poetry Fell in Love with Film', her chapter in The Oxford Handbook of Contemporary British and Irish Poetry (OUP, 2013). Olsen provided her own engagement with the aesthetics of the film poems in 'To Quill at Film' published in Trenchart: Logistics (Los Angeles: Les Figues, 2013). As noted above, Olsen's poetic film essay 'Now Circa (1918), produced to mark the centenary of suffrage for some women in Great Britain in the contemporary context of Trump and #MeToo, was shortlisted for the AHRC research in Film Award (2018). More recently, she produced a text for film and live performance 'Judgement Action' (or 'Foil, Jumping, Daisies), which draws on research into Black Mountain College. Olsen discusses her engagement with film in an interview for the midnight mollusc.

One of her most recent works is weather, whether radar: plume of the volants, published by ethical midge / electric crinolines in September 2021. This substantial volume consists of series of visual and textual works that were produced, as a result of the DARE Prize, through conversations and collaborations with the BioDar research team at the University of Leeds, Opera North, and in association with the National Science and Media Museum and the Tetley Art Gallery. It explores the possibilities of a poetic, creative-critical and visual engagement with the BioDar research team's rereading of weather-data collected by the UK's extensive weather radar network. This archive of data, collected to record weather, accidentally also mapped insect life. This aspect of the archive, which was regarded by the meteorologists as 'noise', has proved to be an invaluable record of insect diversity and abundance for the BioDar group. Olsen's poetic and art-led practice explores how to engage with scientific data (and cross-disciplinary academic expertise drawn from the fields of biology, ecology, physics and atmospheric science) and how to frame related ecological, historical and cultural concerns. At the same time, the poetic and artistic project has been open to contexts beyond the laboratory, responsive to contemporary events. Like the BioDar research, weather, whether radar has also been concerned to repurpose a technology originally developed for warfare for alternative purposes - in this case, a concern with climate change and environmental degradation.

She was one of fourteen artists selected by AMBruno for their book-art project 'Intervals' at Tate Britain in October 2024. Her piece, fossil oil: a book of hours is produced in a sewn hand-made, limited edition of twelve copies. It is bound with covered boards on stubs and has a semi-rigid case binding and fabric outer covering. (The concept for the design of the fabric outer covering is based on the medieval girdle -book.) It includes a number of hand-printed elements and fold-out sections (produced through a variety of hand and digital processes). As the title suggests, the form and structure are arranged with reference to the medieval Book of Hours. The book is divided into seven intervals with a different poetic text in each section. These intertextual poems offer a series of secular meditations for our fossil fuel era that are playfully disrupted by traces of other books, bodies, readers, and related found materials. A film of Olsen reading some sections from fossil oil is available on vimeo:https://vimeo.com/1020786106?from=outro-local. In February 2025, she staged a performance of fossil oil: a book of hours in 'Walking the Book: from medieval object, urban flaneuse, to run(a) way disgust' in the atrium of the University of London Senate House. For this event, the audience was required to wear headphones. The headphones had three channels: one a drone track; one a reading of fossil oil by Olsen; the third a new creative-critical text which provided a contextual commentary for fossil oil but also turned this performance of the work into a site-specific event by engaging with Senate House itself - particularly through references to Eileen O'Shaughnessy, a graduate student at University College London, who worked in Senate House when it was the Ministry of Information during World War II. The text recalls how O'Shaughnessy wrote a poem 'End of the Century, 1984'in 1934, and how this has been linked to the novel 1984, by her husband George Orwell, a novel in which Senate House becomes the Ministry of Truth. (See Eileen Blair.)

For this performance of 'Walking the Book', Olsen's MA and research students wore copies of the girdle book (hence the reference to fashion runways in the event's title). They paraded slowly around the atrium, and they were soon joined in this slow perambulation by the audience as the atrium was effectively transformed into a conventual cloister. Soon the audience was dispersed around the atrium, promenading or seated around the walls, engaged in silent listening, an action that was simultaneously an individual meditation and a collective experience. Meanwhile, Olsen's texts overlaid this space with an expanding range of associations. A reference to windows, for example, drew attention to the windows of the atrium; a textual reference to the 'ornate' prompted awareness of the ornate ceiling. The engagement with 1984 also awakened memories of the use of Senate House as a film set - usually as an embassy or some other official building in an authoritarian state. The opening out of associations was part of Olsen's engagement with complexity and complicity in the work: the use of black pvc for the binding of the work, for example, is a synecdoche for our complicity in the petrochemical catastrophe, while the text partakes of (and augments) the complex temporalities of the book of hours: a linear progression through the day which is also circular through the repetition of days; a focus on the present moment which is also an opening out to eternity.

While her focus on rewilding the medieval girdle book generated both an edition of wearable girdle books and a promenade performance with a triptych of headphone tracks (Fossil Oil: a book of hours, 2024), 'her most recent work 'Rough / Ruff' (performed at Goldsmith's College, 2025) engages with the history of the ruff as a wearable fashion object in relation to its materials and associated social constructions, such as sumptuary laws which attempted to regulate the transgressive explosion of Elizabethan ruffs. The work develops out of the fact that these ruffs were made from materials that overlap with Elizabethan bookmaking and from the way in which constructions of ruffs can be glimpsed in Elizabethan visual art and writing about this art. The ruffs themselves constituted a sign system for fashionable performances in society, on stage and in paintings. Olsen’s exploration of the ruff as a form for 21st Century bookmaking writes through aspects of this cultural history to make a hybrid new form of concertina books that exist independently, like the girdle book, as book-works and as wearable art objects. She draws on the traditional techniques of bookbinding alongside a more D.I.Y. aesthetic of punk poetic subcultures. The intervention in practice Olsen proposes is not to conflate art with writing about art but to make a new wearable form of art writing.

Olsen's critical work also includes: 'Strategies of Critical Practice: Recent Writing on Experimental and Innovative Poetry by Women' (Signs, 33:2, Winter 2008, 373-87); 'Degrees of Liveness, Live and Electronic Subjects: Leslie Scalapino, Fiona Templeton and Carla Harryman', How2, I.6; 'Kites and Poses: Attitudinal Interfaces in Frank O'Hara and Grace Hartigan' in Robert Hampson and Will Montgomery (eds), Frank O'Hara Now (Liverpool University Press, 2010), 178-94; 'Book-parks and non-sites: Susan Howe's Scripted Enclosures', Jacket 40 (2010);'Field Recording as Writing: John Berger, Peter Gizzi and Julian Spahr in Will Montgomery and Stephen Benson (eds), Writing the Field Recording (Edinburgh, 2018) 167-86.

Between 2006 and 2010 Olsen was the editor of the online journal How(2). For a number of years, she ran POLYply with Will Montgomery and Kristen Kreider, a cross-media and intermedia performance series, that incorporated poetry, art, music, and film. She continues to be co-curator of the Institute of Electric Crinolines.

== Books of Poetry ==
- fossil oil: a book of hours (AMBruno, 2024).
- weather, whether radar: plume of the volants (ethical midge, electric crinolines, 2021)
- Film Poems (Les Figues, 2014)
- Punk Faun: A Bar Rock Pastel (Subpress, 2012)
- Secure Portable Space (Reality Street, 2004)
- Here are My Instructions [with Susan Johanknecht] (Gefn Press, 2004)
- Star Furnishing (Toiling Elves, 2004)
- Attention (Lounge, 2003)
- unmarkedforsearch (allsingingalldancing, 2001)
- Book of The Fur (Rem Press, 2000)
- Book of the Insect (allsingingalldancing, 1999)
- Quid Pro Quo (allsingingallDancing, 1998)

Her work is also included in the following anthologies:

- Carrie Etter (ed.), Infinite Difference: Other Poetries by U.K. Women Poets (Exetere: Shearsman, 2010).
- Caroline Bergvall, Laynie Browne, Teresa Carmody, Vanessa Place (eds), I'll Drown My Book: Conceptual Writing by Women (Los Angeles: Les Figues, 2012).
- Emily Critchley (ed.) Out of Everywhere 2: linguistically innovative poetry by women in north america & the uk (Hastings: Reality Street, 2015).

== See also ==
- British Poetry Revival
