= Lily McMenamy =

American-born English model and actress (born 1994)

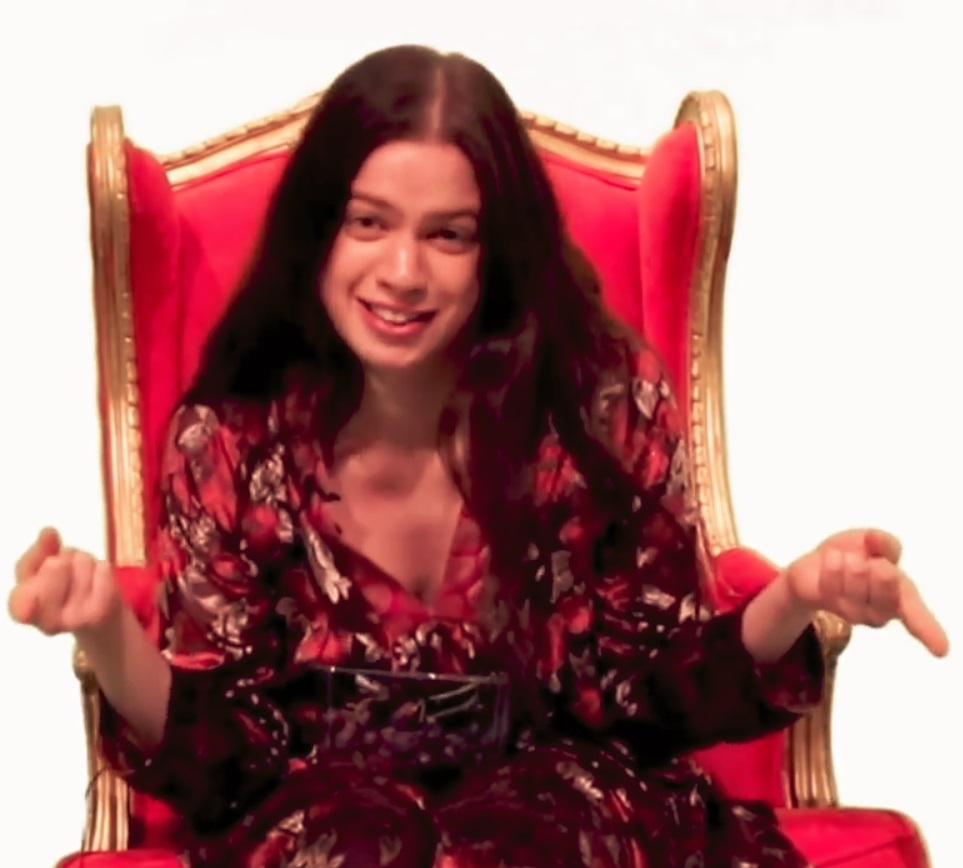
- McMenamy for Love magazine in 2017
- Born: Lily Camille McMenamy; 3 April 1994 (age 32); Pennsylvania, U.S.
- Occupations: Model; actress
- Years active: 2012–present
- Parent(s): Kristen McMenamy; Hubert Boukobza
- Modeling information
- Height: 5 ft 11 in (180 cm)
- Hair color: Brown
- Eye color: Blue-green
- Agency: Next Model Management (New York, Paris, Milan, London); Chic Management (Sydney)

Lily Camille McMenamy (born 3 April 1994) is an American-born English model and actress.

== Early life ==
McMenamy was born in Pennsylvania. Her mother, Kristen McMenamy, is an American model. Her father, Hubert Boukobza, was a Tunisian who once owned the nightclub Les Bains-Douches in Paris, France.

As a baby, McMenamy was photographed with her mother for a fashion photo spread that appeared in the French edition of Glamour. She was once carried in her mother's arms as she walked in a Chanel fashion show.

McMenamy grew up in London, England, with her mother and stepfather, the English fashion photographer Miles Aldridge. She attended Parliament Hill School and also Camden School for Girls. She would occasionally travel to Paris to spend time with her biological father.

== Career ==
At the age of 18, McMenamy moved to Paris to work as a waitress. Once there, upon the suggestion of a friend, French model Morgane Dubled, McMenamy decided to begin working as a model, and was signed by Next Management.

In October 2012, she had her first significant modelling assignment, being chosen to walk the runway for Yves Saint Laurent's spring/summer 2013 fashion show, designed by Hedi Slimane. The very next day, she walked the runway for Chanel.

Six months later, she attracted attention when she took part in the Marc Jacobs fall/winter 2013 fashion show, where she walked the runway wearing just a pair of hot pants and long black gloves. She was topless, covering her breasts with her right arm as she walked. She was later chosen by Jacobs to appear in the ad campaign for that collection. She also appeared in the fall/winter 2013 ad campaign for United Colors of Benetton.

McMenamy has also modelled for other fashion brands, such as Louis Vuitton, Fendi, Moschino, A.P.C., Balmain, Emilio Pucci, Vionnet, Jean Paul Gaultier, Kenzo, and Giles Deacon. She has graced the covers of the magazines i-D, Purple, LOVE, Russh, and Zoo Magazine. She has been featured in the pages of British Vogue, Vogue Italia, Interview, L'Officiel, Teen Vogue, Numéro, V, Dazed, Tatler, and T: The New York Times Style Magazine.

Additionally, she has worked with some of the fashion industry's photographers like Juergen Teller, Peter Lindbergh, Jean-Baptiste Mondino, Ellen von Unwerth, and Terry Richardson.

McMenamy appeared in the 2015 film A Bigger Splash.

In October 2020, McMenamy appeared with her mother on the cover of the 40th anniversary issue of i-D magazine, photographed by Alasdair McLellan.

== Personal life ==
McMenamy has a younger sister and two younger brothers from her mother's marriage to Aldridge. She considers her mother her favourite model, and has said, "My mother has been a massive influence, now more than ever."

McMenamy likes to practice yoga in her spare time. She starred in a short film titled We Like the Zoo made by photographer and filmmaker KT Auleta.

== Filmography ==
=== Film ===
Year	Title	Role	Notes
2015	A Bigger Splash	Sylvie	
2026	At Night		

=== Television ===
Year	Title	Role	Notes
2015	Translantics	Laci Loko	Television mini-series
