= Robert Gavin Hampson =

British poet & academic (born 1948)

Robert Gavin Hampson FEA FRSA (born 1948) is a British poet and academic. Hampson was born and raised in Liverpool, studied in London and Toronto and settled in London. He is currently Professor Emeritus at Royal Holloway. He was Visiting Professor at the University of Northumbria (2018–21) and Research Fellow at the Institute for English Studies, University of London (2019–23). He is a member of the Poetics Research Centre and the Centre for GeoHumanities at Royal Holloway. He is well known for his contributions to contemporary innovative poetry and the international study of Joseph Conrad.

== Early life and education ==
Robert Gavin Hampson was born in Liverpool in 1948. He won a Governors' Scholarship to attend Merchant Taylor's School, Crosby (1960–67).He subsequently studied English literature at King's College London between 1967 and 1970 and was awarded a Commonwealth Scholarship to complete a master's degree at University of Toronto. With the award of a major State Studentship, he then returned to King's College, London, in 1971 where he completed a PhD on Joseph Conrad.

== Poetry ==
During the 1970s he co-edited the poetry magazine Alembic with two other graduates from King's College, Peter Barry (poet) and Ken Edwards, and was a key figure in the second generation of the British Poetry Revival. His poetry was published in Cid Corman's Origin, Alan Davies's 100 Posters, and in a range of other magazines during the 1970s. It was also included in the Arts Council's anthology, New Poetry 3 (1977). His work as one of the editors of Alembic has received attention in two books by Wolfgang Gortschacher - Little Magazine Profiles: The Little Magazines in Great Britain, 1939-1993 (University of Salzburg, 1993) and Contemporary Views on the Little Magazine Scene (Poetry Salzburg, 2000)- and, more recently, in an interview (with Ken Edwards) by Sophie Seita in the magazine mimeo mimeo (2014). This has now been republished as 'transatlantic axis of alembic' in Jacket2.

His best-known work is probably his early long-poem, Seaport (Pushtika, 1995; Shearsman, 2008), composed during the 1970s, which has been written about by Peter Barry, Andrew Duncan, Amy Cutler, Neal Alexander and others. Barry's extended analysis of Seaport begins by noting its 'extensive use of "incorporated data" of various kinds', ranging from various literary sources (including works by Defoe, Melville, Hawthorne and Conrad) to 'historical accounts of the growth and development of the port, of the history of race relations in the city, newspaper accounts of local events and local guidebooks' (Contemporary British Poetry and the City, p.159). He concludes by describing this long poem as 'a large-scale vehicle of surprising flexibility which can accommodate the overtly political, the archival-historical and radically pared-down versions of poetry's more familiar affective modes' (Contemporary British Poetry and the City, p.162). Andrew Duncan similarly suggested that Seaport was 'a major work, where the recovery of pure facts without explanatory annotation allows the build up of a new understanding on the large scale' (The Council of Heresy, p. 29). Cutler argues that, in this work, Hampson 'shows the conflict between the different social typologies of space in the seaport'. Neal Alexander draws attention to the poem's demonstration of how 'multiple channels of traffic have shaped the port of Liverpool over time' - the cotton trade, the slave trade, Irish emigration. In the post 1939 section of the CUP English Literature in Context, John Brannigan describes Seaport as 'an important book for its extraordinary poetic account of the history and development of Liverpool'. More recently, Phillip Jones has included discussion of Seaport in his 2018 Nottingham University PhD, 'Rewriting the Atlantic archipelago: Modern British poetry at the coast'.

Hampson's poetry has gone through various stages. The early work explored open-field poetics and what Peter Barry has called 'content-specific' poetics (in Seaport), but also treated text in How Nell Scored (1976) and 'on the trail' (1976). He subsequently explored self-conscious narrative and montage in his Godard-inspired film poems 'one plus one' (1980) and 'handy narratives' (1985); and a phrasal poetics (derived from Lyotard's 'The Differend' and his own critical engagement with the work of Adrian Clarke) in a human measure (1989) and unicorns: 7 studies in velocity (1989) - and subsequent volumes. This part of his career is represented in Assembled Fugitives (2001); some of the critical engagement with Clarke is evidenced in his essay 'Producing the Unknown' in New British poetries (1994); and Clarke, in turn, has discussed 'a human measure' and 'unicorns' in 'Robert Hampson and a Neo-Formalist Moment', his contribution to For Robert (2017), edited by Redell Olsen. More recent work by Hampson has been engaged in exploring the resources of the sonnet. His poetry has been translated into German, Italian and Rumanian. See, for example, Wolfgang Gortschacher & Ludwig Laher, So Also Ist Das: Eine Zweisprachige Anthologie Britischer Gegenswartslyrik (Haymon-Verlag, 2002), and the translation of the sequence 'Lou Mistrau' in the Italian journal Soglie (August 2014).

In 2012, his collection Reworked Disasters (knivesforksandspoons press) was long-listed for the Forward Prize. In his comprehensive study of the sonnet in English, The Sonnet (Oxford University Press, 2019), Stephen Regan discusses Reworked Disasters in relation to sonnets by Ken Edwards and Tony Lopez as examples of the contemporary avant-garde sonnet. He describes Hampson's 'serious political focus on global warfare, imperialism, and torture' in this 'linguistically discontinuous' fourteen-sonnet sequence. (The Sonnet, p. 382).Hampson's more recent work includes 'love's damage', which was published in the Surrey Poetry Festival Magazine (21.05.11), edited by Amy De'Ath and Jonty Tiplady; 'sonnets 4 sophie' first published in Veer Vier (September 2013), while an explanation of colours was reviewed by Edmund Hardy and Melissa Flores-Borquez in Intercapillary Space and out of sight (crater, 2012) and Liverpool (hugs &) kisses, his 2014 collaboration with Robert Sheppard, are reviewed on the 'other room' website. In their review of out of sight, the Institute of Electronic Crinolines referred to 'The artificial highs of Robert Hampson's noir on overload' and described the text as evoking 'a knowingly flimsy fantasy of what resistance to all forms of identification might be like'. More recently, he has contributed to Robert Sheppard's European Union of Imaginary Author's project through a collaboration with Sheppard. This collaboration is included in Robert Sheppard (ed.) Twitters for a Lark: Poetry of the European Union of Imaginary Authors (Shearsman, 2017).

His sequence 'Volupte: 22 Constructions for Ewald Matare' is included in the Spring 2021 issue of Long Poem Magazine, and the volume Covodes 1-19 was published in December 2021 by Artery editions. Some of the Covodes have been published in Molly Bloom and junction box, and a recording of a performance of some of the Covodes (with accompaniment by cellist Jo Levi) at the 2021 Surrey Poetry Festival is available at vimeo.com/556947245. A full recording of Covodes 1-19 and Levy's 'Suite for Solo Cello' is available at www.arteryeditions.bandcamp.com.In a review of recent poetry, Billy Mills (poet) has commented on Covodes: 'Hampson folds his multiple concerns into a single nexus with the multiple challenges that confront this ambition for equity that should underpin our society ... Against which we see the prevailing influence of money and power'. A selection from Covodes 1-19 (translated into Italian by Marzia Dati) was published in Soglie, XXII, 1-2 (April–August 2020), and an interview with Robert Hampson about Covodes 1-19 by Belinda Giannessi was published in the Tears in the Fence blog (http://tearsinthefence.com/blog). A selection from the second sequence of covodes, transmissions, has been published online by datableed. The critical response to this sequence concludes: 'At the heart of this second set of covodes is therefore a question of what constitutes a ‘public’. In its etymological origins, the Latin publicus could signify both ‘of the people’ or ‘of the state’ and ‘done for the state.’ Especially at time of crisis, political discourse likes to evoke a mythical ‘will of the people’ as a rhetorical device that serves to bolster and extend the reach of the ruling class. Hampson’s poems – which critique ‘reflected britishness’ as a ‘myth’ – is keenly attentive to such linguistic manipulations. What is stake in ‘variants of concern’ is therefore a detourning of what a ‘public voice’ can and should be: these poems are in search of a voice that might wrench the word ‘public’ away from the mouths of politicians so that it could be recovered something other than a wound or a social untruth.'

In the 2024 'unfinishing' podcast, 'Publishing an unfinished poem (twice)', Hampson discusses (with Emily Anderson) finishing, unfinished, the unfinished and the finished unfinished in relation to his critical and creative practices: https://open.spotify.com/show/1ez2Ji4YEwBSm7uzpZ5nzC

== Scholarship ==
=== Poetry criticism and creative writing ===
Hampson taught at Royal Holloway, University of London, from 1973, and was Professor of Modern Literature there from 2000. From 2016 to 2019, he was Distinguished Teaching and Research Fellow in the Department of English at Royal Holloway. He was Visiting Professor at the University of Northumbria (2018–21) and Research Fellow at the Institute for English Studies, University of London (2019–23). He is currently Professor Emeritus at Royal Holloway, University of London.

He has contributed to the critical discourse about recent and contemporary poetry - most visibly through a series of co-edited books: The New British poetries: The scope of the possible (Manchester University Press, 1993), co-edited with Peter Barry, which was described as a pioneering work in the field; Frank O'Hara Now: New Essays on the New York Poet (Liverpool University Press, 2010) co-edited with Will Montgomery; Clasp: Late modernist poetry in London in the 1970s (Shearsman, 2016), co-edited with Ken Edwards; and The Allen Fisher Companion (Shearsman, 2020), co-edited with Cris Cheek. In their essay for The Year's Work in English Studies, K. O'Hanlon describes Clasp as 'essential reading for anyone interested in getting to grips with post-war poetry and the avant garde'. Lyndon Davies begins his lengthy review of The Allen Fisher Companion in the Journal of British and Irish Innovative Poetics (13 [1]) with the observation: 'Most of whatever it is you might look for in a companion to the work of a poet / artist as multifariously challenging as Allen Fisher, this book supplies in spades'.

During his time as head of the Department of English, Hampson founded the MA in poetic practice at Royal Holloway, University of London, with Redell Olsen in 2002 and the MA in creative writing with Andrew Motion in 2003. With Helen Carr and others, he was instrumental in bringing about the regulation change which enabled the introduction of creative writing into the University of London PhD. He has regularly taught on the poetic practice pathway, and he was director of the MA in creative writing for 2016–17. Graduates of the creative writing programme whom he taught include the novelists Tahmima Anam, Adam O'Riordan, Anna Whitwham and Sarah Perry and the poets Robert Selby and Declan Ryan. Graduates of the poetic practice programme whom he taught include Elizabeth-Jane Burnett, Prudence Chamberlain, Becky Cremin, Frances Kruk, Ryan Ormonde, Jooyeon Park, Nisha Ramayya,Sophie Robinson, Karenjit Sandhu and Steven Willey. He also co-supervised the PhDs of Karen McCarthy Woolf, Mary Jean Chan and Agnieszka Studzinska. He recently co-edited pertinent actions (Osmosis Press, 2023) with Briony Hughes, an anthology of work by alumni of the Poetic Practice programme (with a Foreword by Marjorie Perloff).

He has also made a significant contribution to innovative poetry in London as the organiser of events and conferences and as the convenor and curator of two important seminar series. In the 1970s he organised a short reading series, Future Events, at The White Swan in Covent Garden with Ken Edwards and Mike Dobbie. At the end of the 1970s, he and Erik Vonna-Michel organised three one-day 'Saturday Courses' at Lower Green Farm: Bob Cobbing, Allen Fisher and Eric Mottram were the subjects of the different days. (See Ken Edwards's account of Lower Green Farm in Clasp and in his memoir Wild Metrics.) In the 1980s, he organised two conferences on Contemporary innovative Poetry at the Centre for English Studies in the University of London Senate House, and, in the 1990s, he facilitated the six SVP Colloquia that took place there (organised by Lawrence Upton). In 1999, he was asked to take over the TALKS series that Bob Perelman had established at King's College, London, during Pereleman's year as a visiting professor there. Hilda Bronstein has given an account of the early years of the London TALKS series in How2 The TALKS series continued for some years at King's under Hampson's direction and then moved to Birkbeck College, University of London, where Redell Olsen and Frances Presley were co-organisers with him. It was superseded by the Contemporary Innovative Poetry Research Seminar, which he runs with Amy Evans Bauer at the University of London Institute for English Studies. In 2004, he set up the Runnymede International Literary Festival in collaboration with Royal Holloway and Runnymede Borough Council. He has continued to be the Festival Director. For some years (2010–16), the Festival transferred some of it activities to Central London as 'Runnymede in London' through collaboration with the Centre for Creative Collaboration (c4cc), which also provided the venue for Polyply, the event series run by Redell Olsen, Will Montgomery and Kristen Kreider.

In 2010–11, he collaborated with the Palestinian visual artist, Leena Nammari, on a concertina book, The Long View, as part of the Beyond Text project. During 2014, he curated an event series, Amid the Ruins, with Carrie Foulkes at the Daniel Blau Gallery, Hoxton Square, London. In 2017, on the occasion of his retirement from full-time teaching, Redell Olsen edited For Robert: An Anthology (RHUL Poetics Research Centre / The Institute of the Electric Crinolines).

=== Joseph Conrad Scholarship ===
He has also pursued a parallel career as a Conrad scholar and editor with four monographs on Joseph Conrad: Joseph Conrad: Betrayal and Identity (1992), Cross-Cultural Encounters in Joseph Conrad's Malay Fiction (2000), Conrad's Secrets (2013), and Joseph Conrad, Cosmopolitanism and Transnationalism. Conrad's Secrets received the first-place prize for the Adam Gillon Award (2015) from the Joseph Conrad Society of America for the best recent work on Joseph Conrad. In 2017, he received the Ian P. Watt Award from the Joseph Conrad Society of America for excellence in Conrad studies. Previous recipients of this life-long achievement award include Norman Sherry and J. Hillis Miller. He has subsequently been awarded the third-place prize for the Adam Gillon Award (2018) for the collection of essays, Conrad and Language (Edinburgh U. P. 2016), which he co-edited with Katherine Isobel Baxter. In 2020, he published a critical biography, Joseph Conrad, in the Critical Lives series from Reaktion Books. Maya Jasanoff describes it as 'insightful, judicious and elegant': 'Joseph Conrad marvellously distils a lifetime of learning by one of the world's leading Conrad scholars. This is the best short guide to Conrad's life available'. His most recent publications include The Reception of Joseph Conrad in Europe (Bloomsbury, 2022), co-edited with Veronique Pauly, which won joint-second-place in the Adam Gillon Awards for 2024; Joseph Conrad, Cosmopolitanism and Transnationalism (Palgrave Macmillan, 2024), which traces the progression from cosmopolitanism to transnational activism in Conrad's works; Joseph Conrad's Cultural Legacy (Bloomsbury, 2024), which he co-edited with Linda Dryden; and the edited collection Joseph Conrad and the Arts of His Time (Edinburgh University Press, 2026).

He was editor of The Conradian (1989–96) and co-edited Conrad and Theory with Andrew William Gibson (Rodopi, 1998). He also edited various Conrad texts – Lord Jim (1986), Victory (1989), Heart of Darkness (1995) – for Penguin books, as well as Rudyard Kipling's Something of Myself (1987) and Soldiers Three/ In Black & White (1993) and Rider Haggard's King Solomon's Mines (2000). His edition of Heart of Darkness for Penguin included the first accurate transcription of Conrad's 'Congo Diary' and was the first to use the 'Carte des routes de portage' (1894), which was supplied to Belgian State Officials for the journey up-river from Matadi, to annotate Conrad's account of the same journey, which he undertook four years earlier. He also edited Nostromo and co-edited (with Andrew Purssell), Ford Madox Ford's Parade's End and Conrad's Lingard Trilogy for Wordsworth. (A short lecture by him on Heart of Darkness is available on https://www.massolit.io/lecturers/119. A longer lecture is available on YouTube:https://www.youtube.com/watch?v=-Ni4qpFdyG4. The lecture he gave on 'Joseph Conrad Today' for the launch of the Joseph Conrad Fellowship in Warsaw in December 2021 is available on YouTube: youtube.com/watch?v=NeE6Ugg7fEU. And the lecture he gave to PUNO (The Polish University Abroad) on 'Conrad, Colonialism and Africa' in March 2022 is also available on YouTube:https://www.youtube.com/watch?v=CMqUe1YtoYw.) A lecture he gave in March 2022 for St Mary's University on 'Joseph Conrad in the Modern World: Conrad and Africa', discussing 'Heart of Darkness and 'An Outpost of Progress' is also available on YouTube: https://www.youtube.com/watch?v=FrUiOo2dPds. In June 2024, he gave the T. S. Eliot Memorial Lecture at the University of Kent: his subject was 'Joseph Conrad: From Cosmopolitanism to Transnational Activism'. He co-edited (with Helen Chambers) Guy de Maupassant's Mademoiselle Perle and other stories (riverrun, 2020), a selection from the translations made by Elsie Martindale and Ada Galsworthy, which were first published in 1903 and 1904 respectively. Conrad was in touch with both Elsie Martindale and Ada Galsworthy about their translations. Hampson was elected Chair of the Joseph Conrad Society(UK) in 2015, and has co-edited The Conradian since 2021.

He was an adviser for ''Hanyut'' (film), a film by the prize-winning Malaysian director U-Wei Haji Saari, based on Conrad's first novel, Almayer's Folly. He also appears in the 2018 TCM documentary, El sueno imposible de David Lean, an exploration of David Lean's long-held plan to adapt Conrad's masterpiece Nostromo as a film <https://youtube.com/watch?v-O2eDIM5XnOU> and in Sladami Conrada (In the footsteps of Conrad) on Polish television. In 2019, the Polish television series Chuligan Literacki (Literary Hooligan) devoted two successive programmes to his work on Joseph Conrad. This series, on TVP Kultura, presented fifteen programmes on 'the most outstanding English writers, philosophers and historians', and included programmes on Quentin Skinner, Antony Beevor and others. The programmes are available on vod.tvp.pl/video/chuligan-literacki.roberthampson-cz-1,40566562.

=== Academic service ===
In addition, he has undertaken various forms of service to the academic community. He was a panel member for the RAE 2008 and the REF 2014. He was also a panel member for the Rumanian and Hong Kong RAEs. He was a member of the QAA Benchmarking Group for Creative Writing and is currently a member of the Practice Research Advisory Group; the Out of Practice Collective based at the IES; the European Science Foundation Panel of Experts; the Commonwealth Scholarship Commission Advisory Committee; and the Fonds Wetenschappelijk Onderzoek (Research Foundation, Flanders)..

== Personal life ==
His first wife was the Bengali children's writer Sibani Raychaudhuri. In Kolkotta, her early work was published in the children's magazine Shondesh edited by Satyajit Ray. In London she was on the Committee of the South Asian Literary Society (founded by Ranjana Ash) and a member of the Asia Women Writers' Collective. She published translations of Bengali poetry, produced jointly with Hampson, in the London Magazine and the TLS; short stories in Spare Rib; and poems and stories in the two anthologies produced by the Collective: Write of Way (The Women's Press, 1988) and Flaming Spirit (Virago, 1994). Hampson later married the George Eliot critic Gerlinde Roder-Bolton.

== Fictionalised appearances ==
He appears as 'a Conrad specialist in London by the name of X' in Jenny Diski's Skating to Antarctica (1997), and he and his colleague Andrew Gibson (Andrew William Gibson) also make an appearance (lightly disguised) in Adam Roberts's 2003 science-fiction novel, Polystom.

== Publications ==
Poetry

- Degrees of Addiction (London: Share, 1975).
- How Nell Scored (London: Poet & Peasant, 1976).
- A Necessary Displacement (Orpington: Pushtika, 1978).
- A Feast of Friends (Durham: Pig Press, 1982).
- A City at War (London: Northern Lights, 1985).
- (with David Miller) Nevsky Prospekt (Dublin: hardPressed poetry, 1988).
- A human measure (Dublin: hardPressed poetry, 1989).
- Unicorns: 7 Studies in Velocity (London: Pushtika, 1989).
- (with Gerlinde Roder-Bolton) Dingo (London: Pushtika Press, 1994).
- Seaport: interim edition (Woking: Pushtika Press, 1995)..
- (with Gerlinde Roder-Bolton), higher densities: a new hampshire sampler (Woking: Pushtika Press, 1996).
- C for Security (Woking: Pushtika Press, 2001).
- Pentimento (Pushtika Press, 2005).
- out of sight (Crater Press, 2012.)
- Assembled fugitives: selected poems, 1973–1998 (Exeter: Stride Press, 2001).
- Seaport (Shearsman, 2008).
- an explanation of colours (Veer Books, 2010).
- (with Leena Nammari) The Long View (2011).
- Reworked Disasters (kfs,2012).
- (with Robert Sheppard) Liverpool (Hugs &) Kisses (ship of fools / pushtika, 2015).
- covodes 1-19 (artery editions, 2021).

Poetry Anthologies

- pertinent actions:poetic practice anthology, co-edited with Briony Hughes (osmosis press, 2023).

Critical Work

Monographs:

- Joseph Conrad: Betrayal and Identity (Macmillan, 1992).
- Cross-Cultural Encounters in Joseph Conrad's Malay Fiction (Palgrave, 2000).
- Conrad's Secrets (Palgrave Macmillan, 2012).
- Joseph Conrad (Reaktion Books, 2020).
- Joseph Conrad, Cosmopolitanism and Transnationalism (Palgrave, 2023).

Edited / Co-edited Volumes:

- (Co-edited with Peter Barry), New British poetries: The scope of the possible (Manchester University Press, 1993).
- (Co-edited with Andrew Gibson), Conrad and Theory (Rodopi, 1998)
- (Co-edited with Tony Davenport), Ford Madox Ford: A Re-Appraisal (Rodopi, 2002).
- (Co-edited with Max Saunders), Ford Madox Ford's Modernity (Rodopi, 2003).
- (Co-edited with Will Montgomery), Frank O'Hara Now (Liverpool University Press, 2010).
- (Co-edited with Ken Edwards), Clasp: late modernist poetry in London in the 1970s (Shearsman, 2016).
- (Co-edited with Katherine Isobel Baxter), Conrad and Language (Edinburgh University Press, 2016).
- (Co-edited with cris cheek), The Allen Fisher Companion (Shearsman, 2020).
- (Co-edited with Veronique Pauly), The European Reception of Joseph Conrad (Bloomsbury, 2022).
- (Co-edited with Linda Dryden), Conrad's Cultural Legacy (Bloomsbury, 2024)
- Joseph Conrad and the Arts of His Time, (Edinburgh University Press, 2026).

Editions

- Joseph Conrad, Lord Jim (edited by Cedric Watts; textual editing by Hampson), Penguin Books, 1986.
- Rudyard Kipling, Something of Myself (with an Introduction by Richard Holmes), Penguin Books, 1987.
- Joseph Conrad, Victory, Penguin Books, 1989.
- Rudyard Kipling, Soldiers Three / In Black and White (with an Introduction by Salman Rushdie), Penguin Books, 1993.
- Joseph Conrad, Heart of Darkness with The Congo Diary, Penguin Books, 1995.
- Joseph Conrad, Nostromo (with an Introduction and Notes by Hampson), Wordsworth Classics, 2000.
- Rider Haggard, King Solomon's Mines (with a Preface by Giles Foden), Penguin Books, 2007.
- Joseph Conrad, Heart of Darkness (edited by Owen Knowles with The Congo Diary edited by Hampson), Penguin Books, 2007.
- Joseph Conrad & Ford Madox Ford, The Nature of a Crime, ReScript Books, 2012.
- Ford Madox Ford, Parade's End (with an Introduction by Robert Hampson and Andrew Purssell), Wordsworth Books, 2013.
- Joseph Conrad, Victory (with a Preface by John Gray and 1989 Introduction by Hampson), Penguin Books, 2015.
- Joseph Conrad, The Lingard Trilogy (Introduction by Andrew Purssell, Notes by Hampson), Wordsworth Classics, 2016.
- Joseph Conrad, Almayer's Folly (Ukrainian translation; Introduction by Hampson), Tempora, 2018.
- Joseph Conrad, The Secret Agent (Ukrainian translation; Introduction by Hampson), Tempora, 2018.
- Guy de Maupassant, Mademoiselle Perle and other stories (Preface by Helen Chambers and Hampson), riverrun, 2020.

e-books

Sounds Anglo-American: Robert Vas Dias interviewed by Robert Hampson, http://www.argotistonline.co.uk/SOUNDS%20ANGLO-AMERICAN.pdf

Videos

- Reading at the Other Room (28/04/2017): otherroom.org/tag/robert-hampson/
- 'Heart of Darkness' lecture for Massolit: massolit.io/courses/conrad-heart-of-darkness-03c23bab-13c8-4af2-b284-c60a9bd104bf
- Heart of Darkness (March 2018): www.royalholloway.ac.uk
- Nostromo: El sueno imposibile de David Lean: imdb.com/title/tt7947298/ (Spanish with subtitles)
- prof. Robert Hampson - Joseph Conrad Today (2021) (Polish)
- Reading Conrad in the Modern World: Conrad and Africa (7 April 2022): www.youtube.com
- Launching CLASP (13 May 2016): www.youtube.com
- Eric Mottram Remembered (12 October 2018): www.youtube.com
- innerview #264 (with Gerry Fialka) (2023): www.youtube.com
