= Laida Lertxundi =

Basque filmmaker

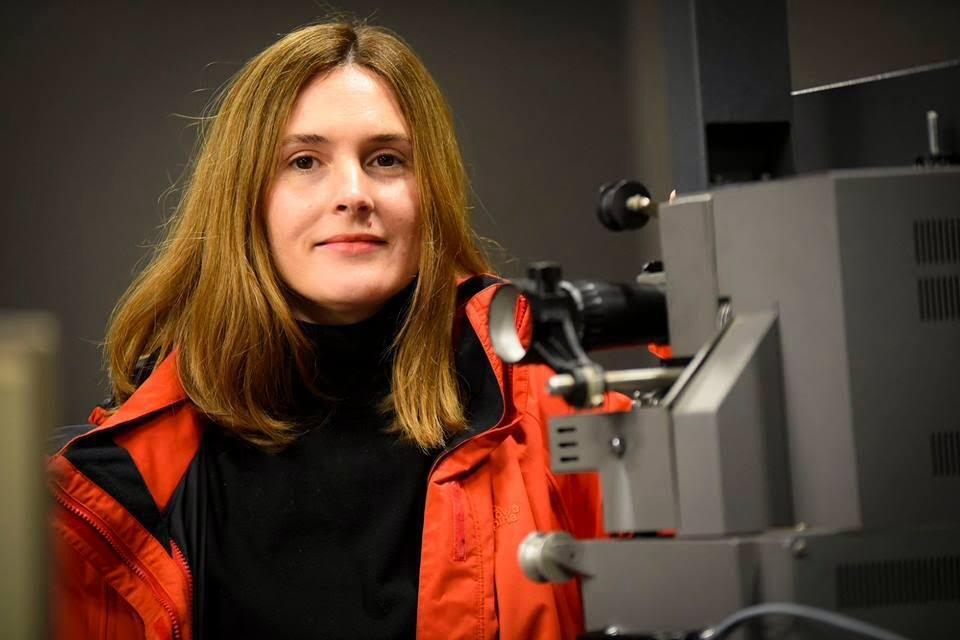
Laida Lertxundi

Laida Lertxundi is a Spanish artist, filmmaker and professor of fine arts based in the United States and the Basque Country.

== Biography ==
Born in 1981 in Bilbao, Spain. She moved to study in the United States. She received an MFA from the California Institute of the Arts and a BFA from Bard College. She is currently a professor at École Nationale Supérieure des Beaux-Arts de Lyon and also teaches at the Universidad del Pais Vasco

Her vocation for cinema began during her studies at Bard College, when she learned about the work of different filmmakers such as Hollis Frampton, Maya Deren and Michael Snow. Lertxundi works in 16mm film.

LUX represents her work in London and is part of the collections of the Museo Centro de Arte Reina Sofía, Centre National des Arts Plastiques in Paris and various private collections. Her monographic book Landscape Plus was published by Mousse Publishing and fluent in 2019. In 2020 she received the Gure Artea award.

== Career ==
Her work has been part of exhibitions in New York, Los Angeles, San Francisco, Lyon, London, Berlin, Seoul, Hamburg and other places.

She has had solo exhibitions at Artium, Vitoria-Gasteiz (2023), La Taller, Bilbao (2022), NoguerasBlanchard (2021), Matadero Madrid (2019), LUX London (2018), Tramway Glasgow (2018), FuturDome Milano (2019), fluent Santander (2017), Tabakalera San Sebastián (2017), DA2 Salamanca (2015), Azkuna Zentroa Bilbao, (2014), Vdrome London (2014) and Marta Cervera, (2013). Her films have been screened at numerous festivals such as Locarno Film Festival, New York Film Festival, International Film Festival Rotterdam, London Film Festival, BFI, TIFF Toronto, Gijón, San Sebastián or Edinburgh among others.

== Filmography ==
- Trout Film (2004)
- Footnotes to a House of Love (2007)
- My Tears Are Dry (2009)
- Cry When it Happens / Llora Cuando Te Pase (2010)
- A Lax Riddle Unit (2011)
- The Room Called Heaven (2012)
- Utskor: Either/Or (2013)
- We Had the Experience but Missed the Meaning (2014)
- Vivir para Vivir / Live to Live (2015)
- 025 Sunset Red (2016)
- Words, Planets (2018)
- Autoficción (2020)
- Inner Outer Space (2021)
- Under the Nothing Night (2021)
- Teatrillo (2021)
- In a Nearby Field (2023)
- Películas (2024)
- Sunrise Slips (2024)

== Awards ==
- Premio Gure Artea (2020)
- Jury Award, Ann Arbor Film Festival (2016)
