= Ken Edwards =

Gibraltarian-born English writer and musician

Ken Edwards (born in Gibraltar, 1950) is a poet, editor, writer and musician who has lived in England since 1968. He is associated with The British Poetry Revival.

Edwards was educated at King's College, London, and at Goldsmiths'. He has been involved in small-press publishing since 1973, when he started up the magazine Alembic with two other King's graduates, Robert Gavin Hampson and Peter Barry. During the same period, he set up Share Publications, which published a number of poetry pamphlets. In 1978 he moved to Lower Green Farm, outside Orpington, where he established an artists' commune and began Reality Studios, a magazine that helped introduce the L=A=N=G=U=A=G=E poets to a British readership. He was one of four co-editors of The New British Poetry (1988). With the poet Wendy Mulford, he set up the literary press Reality Street in 1993 - she withdrew from the project in 1998, and Edwards continued to run the press on his own. As from 2016, it no longer publishes new titles. He was interviewed by Wolfgang Gortschacher about these activities, and the interview ('From Alembic to Reality Street Editions') was published in Gortschacher's substantial 'Contemporary Views on the Little Magazine Scene' (Poetry Salzburg, 2000). Edwards has published two accounts of the Lower Green Farm commune: in his essay in 'Clasp: late modernist poetry in London in the 1970s' (Shearsman, 2016), which he co-edited with Robert Hampson, and in 'Wild Metrics' (Grand Iota, 2019), where it is part of a more extended account of poetry (and alternative life in general) in London from the 1970s.

His poetry publications include 'Lorca: An Elegiac fragment' (Alembic editions, 1978); 'Tilth'(Galloping Dog Press, 1980) and 'Tilth Dub' (Reality Studios, 1980), both written during his time at Lower Green Farm; 'Drumming & Poems' (Galloping Dog Press, 1982); 'Intensive Care' (Pig Press, 1986) 'A4 Landscape' (Reality Studios, 1988); 'Lyrical Ballets' (Torque Press, 1990); and two selected poems, 'Good Science: Poems 1983-91' (Roof Books, 1992) in America and 'No Public Language: Selected Poems, 1975-95' (Shearsman, 2006) for the UK. His collection 'eight + six' (Reality Street, 2003) was part of a revival of interest in the sonnet among innovative poets. Stephen Regan devotes a chapter to this phenomenon, the innovative poetry sonnet, in his encyclopaedic study of the English sonnet, 'The Sonnet' (Oxford University Press). His Collected Poems 1975-2020 was published in 2021 by Shearsman Books.

He married Elaine Randle in August 1999, and together they moved from London to Hastings, East Sussex, in 2004, where they established the bands The Moors and Afrit Nebula. He writes material for Afrit Nebula, plays bass guitar and sings backup.

In recent years Edwards has become better known as a writer of prose fiction and non-fiction. His novels include Futures (1998), Country Life (2015), The Grey Area (2020), Secret Orbit (2022) and Grech (2025). In 2019 he published an autobiographical memoir about his 1970s experiences of the alternative poetry scene in London, Wild Metrics. He started the press Grand Iota in 2019 in collaboration with Brian Marley, publishing new prose writing.

== Bibliography ==
- Good Science (Roof Books, 1992)
- Futures (Reality Street, 1998)
- eight+six (Reality Street, 2003)
- No Public Language: Selected Poems 1975-95 (Shearsman Books, 2006)
- Bird Migration in the 21st Century (Spectacular Diseases, 2006)
- Nostalgia for Unknown Cities (Reality Street, 2007)
- Songbook (with Elaine Edwards, Shearsman Books, 2009)
- Bardo (Knives Forks and Spoons Press, 2011)
- Down With Beauty (Reality Street, 2013)
- Country Life (Unthank Books, 2015)
- a book with no name (Shearsman Books, 2016)
- Wild Metrics (Grand Iota, 2019)
- The Grey Area (Grand Iota, 2020)
- Collected Poems 1975-2020 (Shearsman Books, 2021)
- Secret Orbit (Grand Iota, 2022)
- Grech (Grand Iota, 2025)

== Anthologies ==
- New Stories 2 (Arts Council, 1977)
- Angels of Fire (Chatto & Windus, 1986)
- The New British Poetry (Paladin Books, 1988)
- Floating Capital: new poets from London (Potes & Poets Press, 1991)
- Poets on Writing (Macmillan, 1992)
- Other: British & Irish Poetry since 1970 (Wesleyan University Press, 1999)
- Binary Myths 2: correspondences with poet/editors (Stride, 1999)
- News for the Ear: a homage to Roy Fisher (Stride, 2000)
