= Caroline Bergvall =

French-Norwegian poet (born 1962)

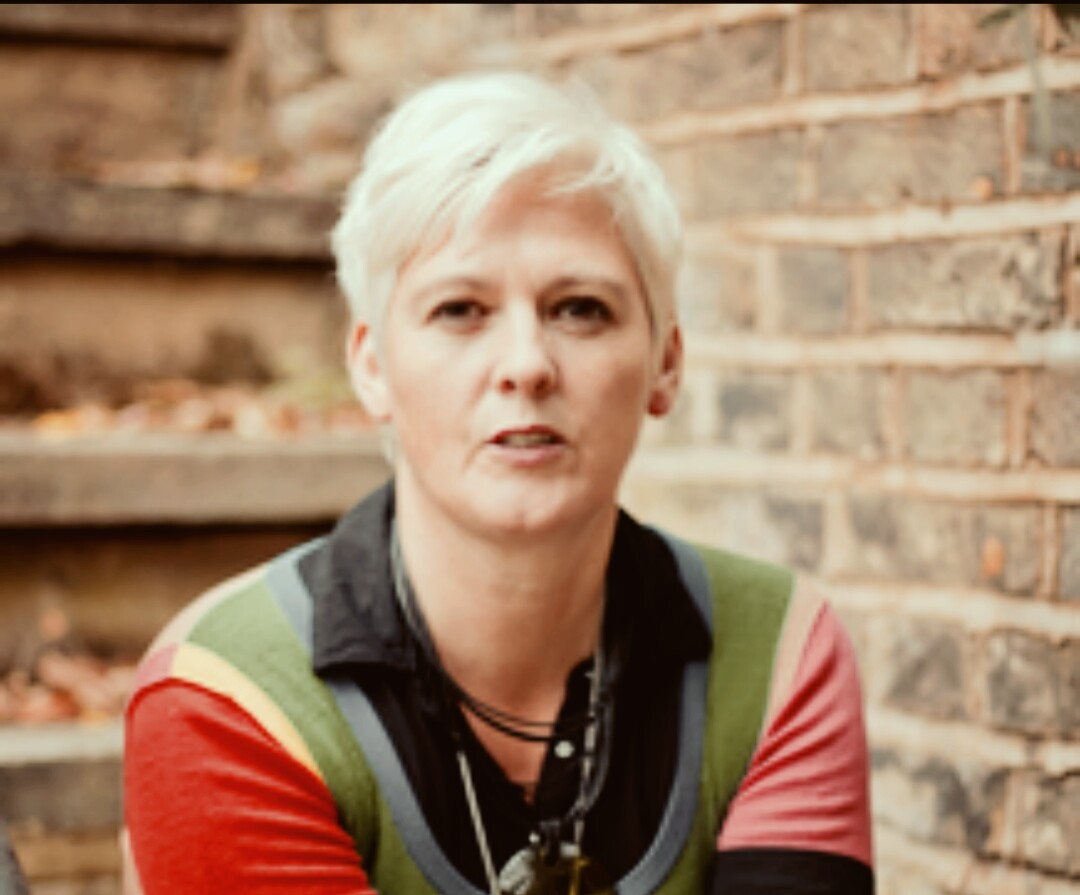
- Born: 1962 (age 63–64); Hamburg, West Germany
- Education: Université de la Sorbonne Nouvelle, University of Warwick, Dartington College of Arts
- Occupations: Poet, artist, academic
- Writing career
- Period: Contemporary
- Notable work: Drift

Caroline Bergvall (born 1962) is a French-Norwegian poet who has lived in England since 1989. Her work includes the adaption of Old English and Old Norse texts into audio text and sound art performances.

== Life and education ==
Born in Hamburg, Germany, Bergvall was raised in Switzerland, France and Norway as well as the United Kingdom and the United States. She studied as an undergraduate at the Université de Paris III, Sorbonne Nouvelle, and continued her studies at the University of Warwick and Dartington College of Arts where she received her MPhil and PhD, respectively.

From 1994 to 2000, Bergvall was director of performance writing at Dartington College of Arts. She has taught at Cardiff University and Bard College. She is currently Global Professorial Fellow in the School of English and Drama at Queen Mary University of London.

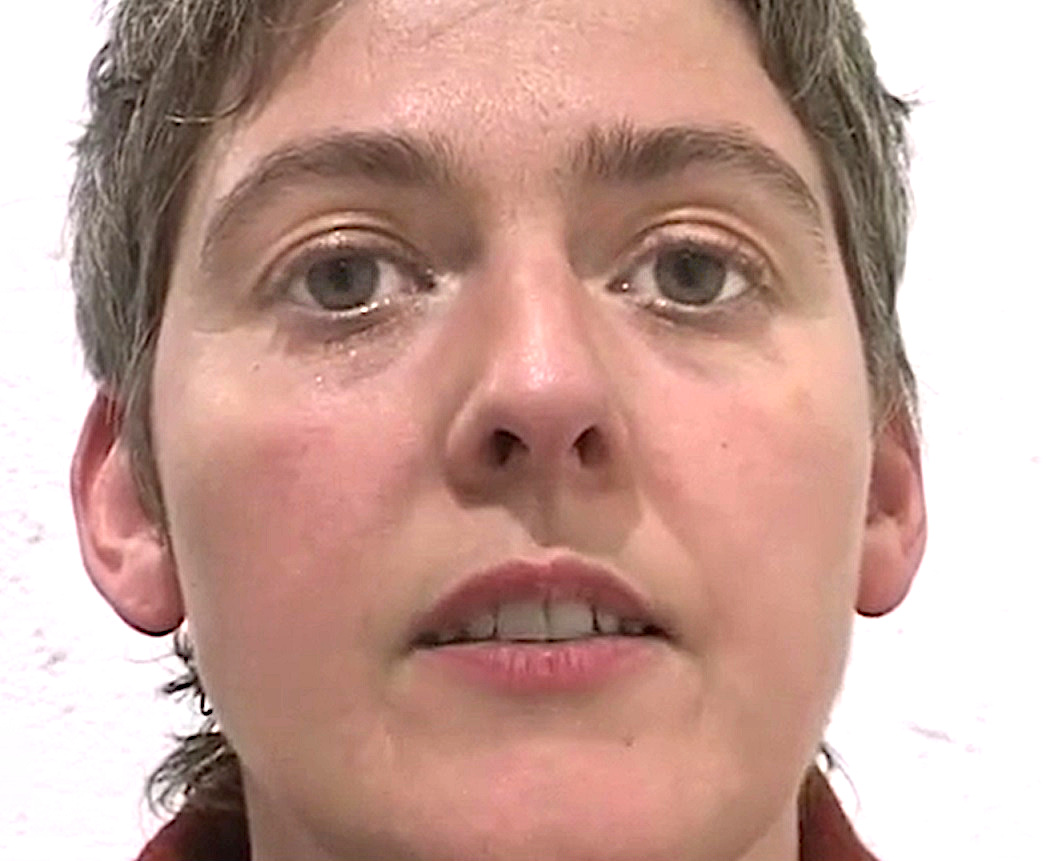
Caroline Bergvall in Speaking Portraits circa 2003

== Performances and writing ==
Bergvall has developed audio texts and collaborative performances with sound artists in Europe and North America. Her critical work is largely concerned with emerging forms of writing, plurilingual poetry and mixed media writing practices, in addition to Performance Writing.

Bergvall's work often draws inspiration from and explores Old English and Old Norse sources. A review of 2011's Meddle English: New and Selected Texts in The Brooklyn Rail noted that her essay "Middling English" urges readers and writers working with English to "excavate its fractured and fractious history." Eve Heisler, writing for Asymptote, summarised that "Bergvall’s projects often foreground the materiality of voice, its tics, spit, accent, errors".

Installations with Ciaran Maher include Lidl Suga for TEXT Festival (2005) and Say: "Parsley" at the Liverpool Biennial (2004). Bergvall's work has also been shown at Dia Art Foundation, Museum of Modern Art, the Serpentine Galleries, Tate Modern, and the Hammer Museum.

=== Drift ===
Bergvall's 'Drift' project is exemplary of how her work embraces multi-modality. 'Drift' was commissioned as a live voice performance in 2012 by Grü/Transtheatre, Geneva. Another version was performed by Bergvall at the 2013 Shorelines Literature Festival, Southend-on-sea, UK, and produced as video, voice, and music performances by Penned in the Margins across the UK in 2014. 'Drift' was published as a collection of text and prints by Nightboat Books in 2014. An exhibition drawing on various elements of the 'Drift' project, including electronic texts made in collaboration with Thomas Köppel, prints, sound, and a "digital, algorithmic collage", was shown at Callicoon Fine Arts, New York, in 2015.

The titular poem of the 2014 Nightboat Books-published collection 'Drift' reinterprets the themes and language of the Old English elegy 'The Seafarer' to reimagine the so-called 'Left to Die' account of refugees crossing the Mediterranean sea, which was reported by Forensic Architecture at Goldsmiths University in 2011. According to a review in Publishers Weekly May 2014, 'toys with the ancient and unfamiliar English', as Bergvall pays particular attention to Old Norse and Old English words and their etymologies, and conveying the experiences of lone voyagers. Drift's feminist politics confront 'Europe's cultural and economic connection to the sea, charting a course from the Vikings, through colonialism, to contemporary slavery that puts prawns on our plates [...] reminding us of our responsibility to each other and to the world'.

In one passage of the printed text, Bergvall omits all vowels from her text followed by two pages of the letter 't'. The Poetry Review suggest that 'It's as though we’re losing sight of the poem in the fog—or as though severe weather has battered the text, which is breaking up and sinking like a shipwreck'.

Drift was a 2017 winner of the Society of Authors' Cholmondeley Prize for poetry.

=== Ragadawn ===
Bergvall and ATLAS Arts began working on Ragadawn in 2016. Bergvall's collaborators for the project include composer Gavin Bryars, soprano Peyee Chen, musician Verity Susman, and sound engineer Sam Grant.

Ragadawn is a multimedia performance that explores ideas of multi-lingualism, migration, lost or disappearing languages, and how language and place intersect. It is performed with two live voices and recorded elements, outdoors, at dawn, which means the start and end times are location specific. It was premiered at the Festival de la Bâtie (Geneva) and at the Estuary Festival (Southend) in 2016. Performances include breakfast for all present, created with local community growers or faith groups.

Ragadawn (Southend) took place at Tilbury Docks Cruise Terminal on Sunday 18 September 2016, commencing at 6:38 am. The site was significant to the themes of the performance as it was the location of the landing of the Empire Windrush ship in 1948.

Ragadawn (Isle of Skye, 57.5º N) took place at Sabhal Mòr Ostaig on Saturday 25 August 2018, between 5:14 am and 6:15 am.

=== Oh My Oh My ===
In October 2017, Bergvall performed her pieces Oh My Oh My in the Great Hall of King's College London for their Arts & Humanities Research Institute's annual Arts and Humanities Festival. Bergvall's spoken word was accompanied by trombonist Sarah Gail Brand and musician Bill Thompson. The description for the event provides a reflection on the work:

In Oh My Oh My, Bergvall explores linguistic connections and displacements through a mix of spoken performance, live improvisation and a chorus of treated interviews. Drawing on language material recently recorded in travels across Europe, as well as live recordings captured during the Global Women’s March for Documenta14, Caroline Bergvall presents poetic variations for a world on the brink. Using a distinctive and unique process of translation and sonic patterning, Bergvall weaves together a language-scape that stretches from Algiers to Reykjavik, creating an abstract and complex passageway of sound made by ancient, endangered, and new local languages. This piece expands an ongoing body of work by Bergvall, which explores issues of linguistic travel and sedimentation, as well as medieval love poetry, and shines a light on linguistic and political thresholds.

=== Conference: After Attar ===
After Attar was a conversation presented by Bergvall at the Whitstable Biennale, 2 June 2018, as 'stage one' of a larger project 'Sonic Atlas'. Bergvall brought together poet Shadi Angelina Bazeghi, sociolinguist Clyde Ancarno, poet and curator Cherry Smyth, medievalist David Wallace, ornithologist Geoff Sample, and artist Adam Chodzko, in the Sea Cadets Hall at Whitstable, to discuss the movement of languages across time and space, how forms of poetry move, and the role of birds in the imagination across history: the conversation descended into everyone talking over one another and the noise of chattering birds. The title plays on 'The Conference of the Birds', a poem by Attar of Nishapur, a medieval Persian poet, whose work was adapted by Chaucer.

== Residencies, fellowships, and accolades ==
2007-2010 - Arts and Humanities Research Council-funded Creative Writing Fellow at the University of Southampton.

2012-2013 - Judith E Wilson Drama and English Visiting Fellow at the University of Cambridge.

2014-2015 - Writer in Residence at the Whitechapel Gallery, London.

2017 - winner of the inaugural 'Prix de l'année', 'for specific work particularly important in the field of non-book literature', of the 'Prix Littéraire Bernard Heidsieck-Centre Pompidou' created by the Centre Pompidou and Fondazione Bonotto.

2017 - recipient of the Society of Authors' Cholmondeley Award for poetry, for Drift.

== Published works ==
- Éclat, Sound & Language, 1996, ISBN 9781899100064
- Fig: Goan Atom 2, Salt, 2005, ISBN 9781844710928
- Middling English, John Hansard Gallery, 2010, ISBN 9780854329113
- Meddle English: New and Selected Texts, Nightboat Books, 2011, ISBN 9780982264584
- Drift, Nightboat Books, 2014, ISBN 9781937658205
- Alisoun Sings, Nightboat Books, 2019, ISBN 1643620010

=== Fiction anthology ===
- I'll Drown My Book: Conceptual Writing by Women, 2012, ISBN 978-1934254332
