= Andrew William Gibson =

Andrew William Gibson is a British scholar, philosopher, children's writer and academic.

== Career ==
Gibson has published widely on James Joyce, Samuel Beckett, literary theory, and philosophy - particularly the work of Alain Badiou. His publications include Joyce's Revenge: History, Politics and Aesthetics in James Joyce's 'Ulysses' (Oxford University Press, 2002), Beckett and Badiou: The Pathos of Intermittency (Oxford University Press, 2006), Intermittency: The Concept of Historical Reason in Recent French Philosophy (Edinburgh University Press, 2011), and The Strong Spirit: History, Politics and Aesthetics in the writings of James Joyce 1898-1915 (Oxford University Press, 2013). His most recent book is Misanthropy: The Critique of Humanity (Bloomsbury, 2017). His Modernity and the Political Fix was published by Bloomsbury in 2019.

Gibson was appointed to a Lectureship in English at Royal Holloway, University of London, in 1977. He was founder and, from 1986 to 2014, organiser of the London University Seminar for Research into James Joyce's Ulysses, and subsequently co-founder of the London University Finnegans Wake seminar. He is a permanent advisory editor to the James Joyce Quarterly and former trustee of the international James Joyce Foundation. He is also an Associate Member of the Beckett International Foundation at the University of Reading. From 2010 to 2017, he was a member of the Conseil scientifique of the Collège International de Philosophie in Paris. He also served on its Comité de Selection.

In 2001 and 2002, he was visiting professor at the Scandinavian Summer School of Literature and Theory. In 2002, he was visiting professor at the University of Tokyo. In 2008, he was Carol and Gordon Segal Professor of Irish Literature at Northwestern University in Chicago. In 2017, he was appointed visiting professor to the J.M. Coetzee Centre for Creative Practice at the University of Adelaide in Adelaide, South Australia. He was research professor in modern literature and theory in the English Department at Royal Holloway for many years until 2015.

He retired from Royal Holloway in 2019.

== Fiction ==
Gibson is the author of five novels and a collection of short stories for children, all published by Faber.

== Selected publications ==
=== Literary studies ===
- Reading Narrative Discourse: Studies in the Novel from Cervantes to Beckett (Basingstoke: Macmillan, 1990)
- Towards a Postmodern Theory of Narrative (Edinburgh: Edinburgh University Press, 1996)
- Postmodernity, Ethics and the Novel: From Leavis to Levinas'' (London: Routledge, 1999)
- Joyce's Revenge: History, Politics and Aesthetics in 'Ulysses' (Oxford: Oxford University Press, 2002)
- Beckett and Badiou: The Pathos of Intermittency (Oxford: Oxford University Press, 2006)
- James Joyce: A Critical Life (London: Reaktion Books, 2006)
- Samuel Beckett: A Critical Life (London: Reaktion books, 2010)
- Intermittency: The Concept of Historical Reason in Recent French Philosophy (Edinburgh: Edinburgh University Press, 2012)
- The Strong Spirit: History, Politics and Aesthetics in the Writings of James Joyce 1898-1915, (Oxford: Oxford University Press, 2013).
- Misanthropy: The Critique of Humanity (London: Bloomsbury, 2017).

=== Children's Fiction ===
- Ellis and the Hummick (London: Faber, 1989)
- The Abradazil (London: Faber, 1990)
- Jemima, Grandma and the Great Lost Zone (London: Faber, 1991)
- The Rollickers and Other Stories (London: Faber, 1992)
- The Amazing Witherspoon's Amazing Circus Crew (London: Faber, 1993)
- Chegwith Skillett Escapes (London: Faber, 1995)
