= Sophie Robinson (poet) =

English poet & teacher (born 1985)

Sophie Robinson (born 1985) is an English poet and teacher.

== Background ==
Sophie Robinson was a student on the MA in Poetic Practice at Royal Holloway, University of London, where she subsequently completed a practice-based PhD in queer poetics under the supervision of Redell Olsen. Robinson's creative and critical work has been published in Pilot, How2, Dusie and elsewhere. Longer collections include Killin' Kittenish (2006), a (2009), Lotion (2010), and The Institute of Our Love in Disrepair (2012). Her work has also been included in the anthologies Voice Recognition: 21 Poets for the 21st Century (Bloodaxe), The Reality Street Book of Sonnets (Reality Street, 2008), and Infinite Difference: Other Poetries by U.K. Women Poets (Shearsman, 2010). She has performed her work in Ireland, as part of the SoundEye Festival, and America. An out lesbian, she lives in London. She teaches at the University of East Anglia.

Robinson was the poetry artist-in-residence at the Victoria and Albert Museum in 2011 and at the University of Surrey in 2012.

== Awards ==
- 2010 Lambda Literary Award nomination for a (Les Figues Press, 2009)
- 2010 Golden Crown Literary Society Goldie Award nomination for a (Les Figues Press, 2009)

== Works ==
- Killin' Kittenish (yt communications, 2006)
- The Reality Street Book of Sonnets (Reality Street, 2008)
- a (Les Figues Press, 2009)
- Voice Recognition: 21 Poets for the 21st Century (Bloodaxe Books, 2009)
- Lotion (Oystercatcher Press, 2010)
- Infinite Difference: Other Poetries by U.K. Women Poets (Shearsman Books, 2010)
- The Institute of Our Love in Disrepair (Bad Press, 2012)
- Rabbit (Boiler House Press, 2018)
