= List of English-language small presses =

This is a list of English-language small presses, small publishers, current or past, that have published (printed) works of fiction and nonfiction, poetry, short stories, essays, pamphlets, limited edition or collectible books and chapbooks, and other forms of literature. In addition to publishing few books per year, the print runs of their titles are often smaller than for books from larger publishers. This list does include periodic publishers of poetry, and literature journals and magazines, including alternative comic books. This list does not include exclusively online publishers, academic publishers (who often publish very limited print runs, but for a different market), or businesses operating solely as printers, such as print-on-demand companies or vanity presses.

== A ==
- Advent Press
- Adventures Unlimited Press
- Ahadada Books
- AK Press
- Akashic Books
- Albion Village Press
- Alternative Comics
- Amok Press
- Amra Press
- And/Or Press
- And Other Stories
- Antelope Hill Publishing
- Arkham House
- Armida Publications
- Armitage House
- Ashendene Press
- ASIA Publishers (English/Korean bilingual works)
- Atlas Press
- Aunt Lute Books

== B ==
- Backwaters Press
- Bellevue Literary Press
- BenBella Books
- Between the Lines Books
- Bitter Lemon Press
- Black Lawrence Press
- Black Sun Press
- Blue Moon Press
- Boydell & Brewer
- Burning Deck Press
- Burning Shore Press

== C ==
- Café Royal Books
- Calamari Press
- Charco Press
- Cheap Street Press
- Circlet Press
- City Lights Bookstore & Publishers
- Coach House Press
- Come!Unity Press
- Common Courage Press
- Contact Editions
- Copper Canyon Press
- Creation Books
- Cuala Press

== D ==
- Dedalus Books
- Deep Vellum
- DNA Publications
- Donald M. Grant, Publisher, Inc.
- Doves Press
- Dun Emer Press
- Dusie Press

== E ==
- Eidolon Publications
- Eland Books
- ENC Press
- Enslow Publishers, Inc.
- Etruscan Press
- Europa Press
- Exact Change

== F ==
- FabJob Inc.
- Fanfrolico Press
- Fantasy Press
- Featherproof Books
- Fedogan and Bremer
- Fiction Collective Two
- Flying Fame Press
- Flying Fish Books
- Flying Fish Press
- Fortune Press
- Four Walls Eight Windows
- FPCI
- Fugue State Press
- Fulcrum Press

== G ==
- Gnome Press
- Golden Cockerel Press
- Graywolf Press
- Grey Walls Press
- Griffith Review
- GUD Magazine

== H ==
- Hangman Books
- Harbor Mountain Press
- Haymarket Books
- Headmistress Press
- Hogarth Press
- Hours Press

== I ==
- Influx Press
- ISFiC Press
- Ishi Press

== J ==
- John Adamson
- Jurassic London

== K ==
- Katydid Books
- Kelmscott Press
- Knockabout Comics
- Kore Press
- Korero Press

== L ==
- Last Gasp
- Legend Press

== M ==
- Macleay Press
- Mandrake of Oxford
- Mandrake Press
- Marick Press
- Matrix Press
- Mayapple Press
- Melville House Publishing
- Menard Press
- Mercury House
- Migrant Press
- Milkweed Editions
- Moschatel Press
- Mourne Press
- Mycroft & Moran

== N ==
- Necronomicon Press
- NESFA Press
- New Falcon Publications
- New Rivers Press
- New Village Press
- New Writers Press
- Nonesuch Press

== O ==
- Obsidian House Publishing
- OR Books
- Ovid Press

== P ==
- Pagan Publishing
- Parallax Press
- Permeable Press
- Phantasia Press
- Pirate Press
- Poetry Bookshop
- Press Gang Publishers
- PS Publishing
- Purple House Press
- Pushcart Press
- Pushkin Press

== R ==
- Richards Press
- Ronin Publishing

== S ==
- St. Dominic's Press
- Salt Publishing
- Sceptre Press
- Scribe
- Seizin Press
- Self Publish, Be Happy
- Serif
- Seven Stories Press
- Shasta
- Slough Press
- Small Beer Press
- Soft Skull Press
- Sort of Books
- Spork Press
- Starblaze Graphics
- Steamshovel Press
- Stone Bridge Press
- Subterranean Press

== T ==
- Tarpaulin Sky Press
- terra incognita arts organisation + publishers
- Thelema Publications
- Thelema Publishing Company
- This Press
- Three Mountains Press
- Ticonderoga Publications
- Tiny Hardcore Press
- Tupelo Press
- Two Dollar Radio
- Twyn Barlwm Press

== U ==
- Ugly Duckling Presse
- Urban Books

== V ==
- Vale Press
- Vine Press

== W ==
- Wakefield Press
- Washington Writers Publishing House
- Weekend Press
- Wrecking Ball Press

== X ==
- Xavier House Publishing

== See also ==
- Association of Little Presses
- Private press
- Self-publishing
- Small Press Distribution, wholesale distributor of small press materials
- List of English-language book publishing companies
- List of English-language literary presses
