= Bill Oakley (comics) =

American comic book letterer (1964–2004)

- Born: William Douglas Oakley; April 1, 1964 Oneonta, New York
- Died: February 16, 2004 (aged 39) Utica, New York
- Area: Letterer
- Notable works: The League of Extraordinary Gentlemen; Batman: Gotham Knights

William Douglas Oakley (April 1, 1964 – February 16, 2004) was a letterer for numerous comic books from Marvel, DC, and other companies. His most prominent works include the first two volumes of Alan Moore and Kevin O'Neill's The League of Extraordinary Gentlemen and Batman: Gotham Knights #1-11, #15-37.

== Biography ==
Oakley attended The Kubert School in Dover, New Jersey for a year, intending to be a comics artist. However, his experience at the school convinced him that he couldn't handle the workload of a comic book artist and, still desiring to work in the comics field, decided to do lettering instead. In July 1986 he started on staff at Marvel, working under Jim Novak. For Marvel, Oakley lettered Avengers for a long time, Avengers West Coast, the X-Men, the Fantastic Four during Walt Simonson’s run, Rampaging Hulk, and Amazing Spider-Man.

Oakley concluded a late 1987 interview by remarking "I would hope, by this time next year, that I would have enough work that I could go freelance. I wouldn't mind the idea of working at home. That kind of appeals to me, not having to get up at 6:00 every morning to commute here. That I definitely would look forward to." Oakley indeed went freelance by the end of 1988. For DC, he worked on a number of the Superman titles, Batman, Lobo, DC vs. Marvel Comics, Batman: Gotham Knights, Justice Society, and Hawkman.

=== Death ===
Due to the fact that he did not possess medical insurance ("because he had a previous medical condition and the insurance companies refused to cover him"), he was forced to letter comics from his hospital bed to pay bills before he died of cancer in Utica, New York. His hometown was Oneonta, New York. Oakley was survived by his wife Leslie and son Stephen.

He was halfway through designing The League of Extraordinary Gentlemen: Black Dossier at the time of his death. The final volume (finished by Todd Klein) was dedicated to his memory, with Moore noting in the introduction to the book that he felt the cancer made Oakley's lettering style much better than a non-cancer-addled letterer.

== Lettering style ==
Oakley had a distinctive but understated lettering style. One of his trademarks as a letterer was to often erase or omit panel borders when they touched the top, side, or bottom of a word balloon or caption, thus opening up the balloon/caption to the gutter. In this regard, Oakley's lettering style was similar to John Workman's. Also like Workman, even in the age of computer lettering, Oakley did all this lettering by hand, using a Hunt 107 pen. Before the age of computer lettering, unlike Jim Novak and others, Oakley was one of the few letterers to continue to create word balloons entirely freehand instead of using templates.

== Awards ==
- 2000: Nominated for "Favorite Letterer" Wizard Fan Award, for The League of Extraordinary Gentlemen, Volume I
- 2002: Nominated for "Favorite Letterer" Wizard Fan Award, for The League of Extraordinary Gentlemen, Volume II
- 2004: Nominated for "Best Lettering" Eisner Award, for Hawkman, JSA, The League of Extraordinary Gentlemen, Volume II and Sleeper

== Bibliography ==
Assorted titles:

- Batman: Gotham Knights #1-11, #15, #17-37 (with Devin Grayson, Roger Robinson and others, DC Comics 2000-2002)
- Daredevil #302-306, #308-322, #324-327, #329-332, #334, #336-343 with various Marvel Comics.
- DC Versus Marvel (with Ron Marz and Dan Jurgens, DC Comics, 1995)
- Grifter v1 #1-2, 5-10 (with Steven T Seagle, Ryan Benjamin, Image Comics, 1995)
- Hawkman v4 #1-6, #8-10, #19-25 (with Geoff Johns and Rags Morales, DC Comics, 2002)
- Spectre v3 #1-11, #13-17, #19, #21 (with J. M. DeMatteis and Ryan Sook, DC Comics, 2001-2002)
- Sleeper #1-3, 7-8 (with Ed Brubaker and Sean Phillips, Wildstorm, 2003)
- Starman v2 #12-63, #55-80, ANNUAL #1&2, STARMAN: THE MIST, STARMAN #1,000,000 (with James Robinson, Tony Harris and Peter Snejbjerg, DC Comics, 1995-2001)
- Team 7 #1-4 (with Chuck Dixon and Aron Wiesenfeld, Image Comics, 1994-1995)
- Team 7: Objective Hell #1-3 (with Chuck Dixon and Chris Warner, Image Comics, 1999)
- Team 7: DEAD RECKONING #1-4 (with Chuck Dixon and Jason Johnson, Image Comics, 1995)
- X-men v2 #19-41 (with Fabian Nicieza and Andy Kubert, Marvel Comics, 1993-1994)
