= Interliterary theory =

Interliterary theory, as part of the study of Literary Comparison, is a study of the concept of interliterariness and interliterary communities. In its short history, the concept has been used and studied mainly in Central and Eastern European and literary scholarship, with most proponents of the idea being among Russian Formalists, Czech and Slovak Structuralists.

Lately, the field has expanded into Latin American scholarship, suggesting alternative, decolonized and decentralized theories and interpretations for the literatures of the colonized periphery. These literary developments explore processes of hybridization of the once separate native culture and an external culture, which are now combined into hybrid transcultural identities. Latin American criticism, by dismissing "eurocentric comparatism", approaches different literatures of Latin America as participating in the same literary system, whose characteristics had to be jointly examined. The Latin American criticism thus created its own version of Ďurišin supranational interliterary community.

The concept is based on interliterariness, whose preceding term, literarariness was coined by Roman Jakobson in 1921. Professor Dionýz Ďurišin, in his Theory of Interliterary Process, characterizes literariness, which Jakobson defines as an object of literary scholarship and not literature, as being of the "basic and essential quality", transcending the boundaries of individual literature, transforming into interliterariness. The interliterariness is the "basic and essential quality" of literature in context of international and inter-ethnic, and with ontological determination, comprising world literature as ultimate manifestation of interliterariness.

Ďurišin adopted a view in which the supra-ethnic and supra-national interliterary community, and all its constituent parts, share a common culture. Contrary to this concept, some literatures, such as Modern Greek and other Balkan literatures, resolutely study literature as the expression of a "linear national culture".

In the late 1980s, an international project Specific Interliterary Communities was conceived and headed by Dionýz Ďurišin of the Slovak Academy.

== See also ==
- Interlitteraria
