= Aron Wiesenfeld =

American comic book artist and painter (born 1972)

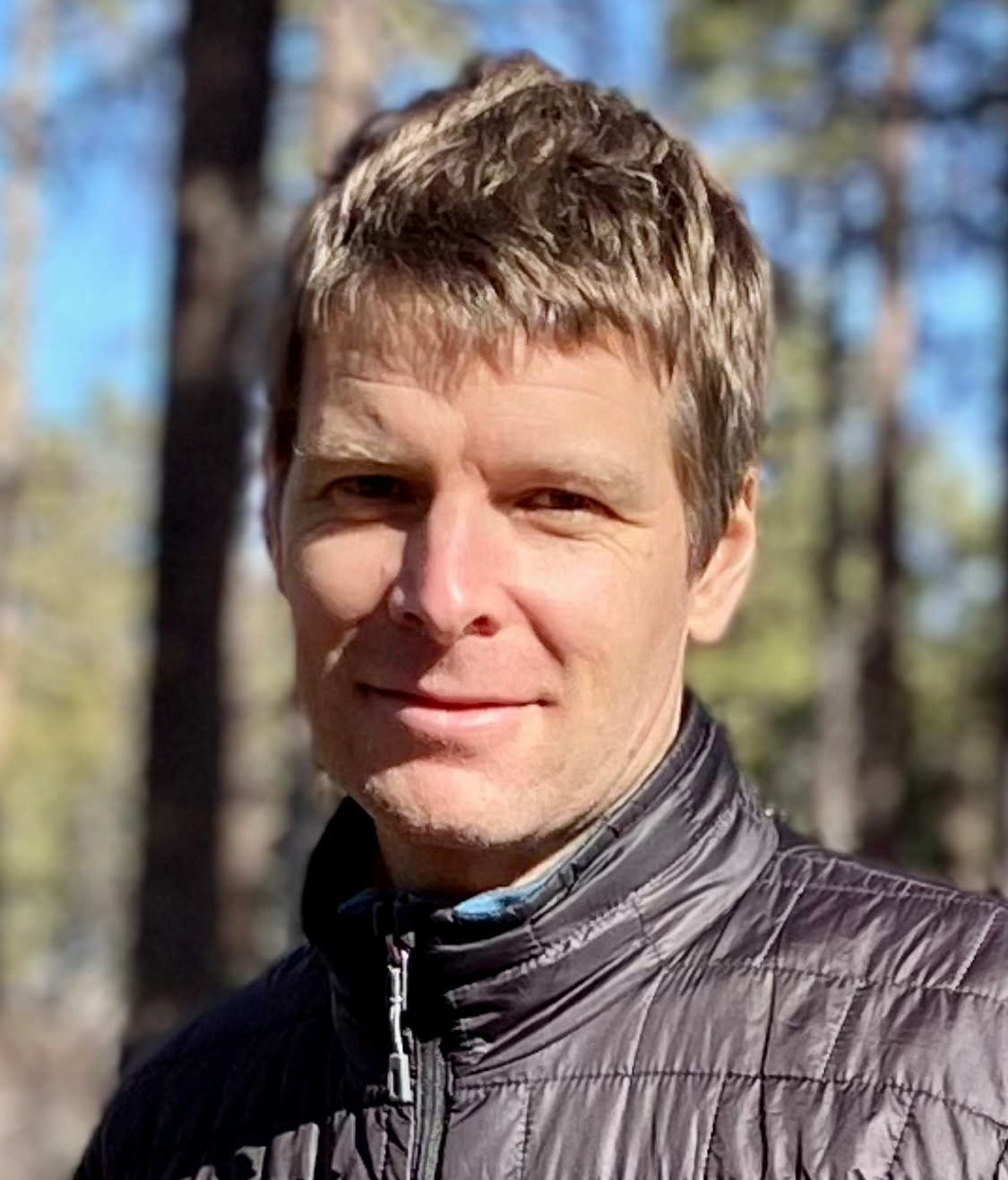
- Born: August 12, 1972 (age 54); Washington, D.C.
- Education: Cooper Union School of Art; Art Center College of Design
- Occupations: Painter, Illustrator, Comic book artist
- Years active: 1992 - present
- Website: aronwiesenfeld.com

Aron Wiesenfeld (born 12 August 1972) is an American painter, illustrator and comic book artist based in San Diego, California. He is known for painting disquieting scenes of lonely youths. His works have been shown at several exhibitions in the United States and Europe including those at Arcadia Contemporary in New York City, Unit London, Long Beach Museum of Art and the Bakersfield Museum of Art. Wiesenfeld has created illustrations for various comics publishing companies including Marvel Comics, Continuity Comics and WildStorm. He was nominated for an Eisner award in 1997 for his work on Marvel Comics' limited series, Deathblow/Wolverine.

== Early life ==
Wiesenfeld was born to Susan Brouwer and Stephen Wiesenfeld in 1972, in Washington, D.C., and grew up in Santa Cruz, California. He began drawing at an early age and received lessons in painting and etching from his grandmother, Betsey Straub Wiesenfeld, a noted watercolor artist. Wiesenfeld cites comic book art as an early influence. From 1990 to 1993, Wiesenfeld attended Cooper Union School of Art in New York City. Later in 1996, he attended Art Center College of Design in Pasadena, California.

== Career ==
=== Comics ===
Wiesenfeld began his professional career in 1992 when Neal Adams offered him a job as a comics penciller at Continuity Comics. The following year Wiesenfeld joined Marvel Comics and began working on the titles such as Cable and X-Men. Soon afterward, he was hired by Jim Lee at Wildstorm Studios, part of the fledgling creator-owned company, Image Comics. At Wildstorm he gained recognition for his storytelling and detailed line drawings in such titles as Team 7, Deathblow and Wolverine. For his works in Deathblow/Wolverine, Wiesenfeld was nominated for an Eisner Award in 1997.

Wiesenfeld left the comic book industry in 1998 but returned for a brief period in the early 2000s for a run of painted cover art for DC/Vertigo titles such as Y: The Last Man, Crusades, and Fables.

=== Fine art ===
In the year 2000, after graduating from Art Center College of Design, Wiesenfeld shifted his focus to oil painting. His first solo exhibition was with Timmons Gallery, San Diego in 2006. In 2009, Wiesenfeld began exhibiting his works at Arcadia Contemporary in New York City, where his work attracted the attention of celebrity collectors such as J. J. Abrams, Joss Whedon and Laura Linney. Wiesenfeld's work has been exhibited in eleven solo exhibitions in the US and Europe. His paintings have been part of more than 50 group exhibitions around the globe.

In 2014, Daniel Maidman reviewed Wiesenfeld's works in The Huffington Post and compared them to the early 20th-century surrealist artist René Magritte. The film director Guillermo del Toro wrote of Wiesenfeld's paintings: "Like Hopper he is concerned with solitude, like Magritte he is bewitched by mystery". In late 2014, IDW Publishing collected Wiesenfeld's work in a hardcover monograph, titled The Well, which collected 15 years of paintings and drawings.

Wiesenfeld's artwork has appeared on the covers of numerous novels, poetry collections and album covers. In 2015 he collaborated with poet Bruce Bond on the book The Other Sky by Etruscan Press.

== Art ==
=== Themes ===
According to David Molesky of Juxtapoz, Wiesenfeld paints images of young people in foreboding landscapes, fraught with undertones of danger. Like characters from fairy tales, the adolescents who populate his paintings often appear under-prepared and vulnerable. In contrast, other examples of his works evoke a calm, dream-like, or surreal feeling. In these, his juvenile subjects seem reflective, or perhaps frozen in a state of internal dialogue. The central protagonists of his images are often "waif-like", gangly-limbed girls who appear to be children on the verge of adulthood. Being in-between life stages is externally echoed by the landscapes they inhabit - neither city or countryside - but the outskirts.

A common motif in his paintings is a metaphorical threshold that blocks the protagonist's path, such as a stream, or the mouth of a tunnel. Wiesenfeld describes these as "a divide between worldly reality and another place. That place could be called spiritual. The characters stare across these thresholds as if they are "trying to get to the other side of a river that is forever out of reach".

=== Influences ===
Wiesenfeld has credited a number of mid-19th century painters as sources of inspiration for his work, such as Caspar David Friedrich, Camille Corot, J. W. Waterhouse, and Puvis de Chavannes. He also maintains admiration for the comic artists who initially inspired him such as Edward Gorey, Mike Mignola, Frank Miller, Chris Ware, and Robert Crumb.
