= Betty Willsher =

Author and Graveyard Expert

- Born: 12 December 1915; Coundon, County Durham, England
- Died: 25 February 2012 (aged 96); St. Andrews, Scotland
- Education: University of St Andrews

Elizabeth Cameron Willsher MBE (12 December 1915 – 25 February 2012) was an early years child psychologist and educationalist, lecturer, children's author, historian, preservationist and noted Scottish Gravestones researcher, recorder, authority and writer.

== Early life ==
Elizabeth Cameron Anderson, known throughout her life as Betty, was born in the village of Coundon in County Durham, England, on 12 December 1915 to Scottish parents William Grieg Anderson, a general practitioner, and his wife Mary Gordon Adam.

She studied at the University of St Andrews from 1933 to 1936 where she graduated with a degree in psychology and philosophy, before going on to complete a one-year certificate in nursery education at the Rachel McMillan Nursery Training College in Deptford. Her first teaching post was at a nursery in London's East End dockyards. She married Rex Willsher in 1937 and gave birth to Penny in 1939. Persistent air raids over the family home in London persuaded the Willshers to move rural Suffolk where she gave birth to her second daughter, Susan, in 1941 and would run a small children's nursery. The Willshers separated in 1949 and Betty returned to St Andrews taking her daughters with her.

== Career ==
Willsher established and operated another small nursery school in the Fife town before completing a part-time Diploma in Education at Dundee. The following years were spent teaching emotionally troubled children in the Stratheden Hospital, in Cupar in Fife with child psychiatrist Douglas Haldane and for a spell in Vancouver. Returning to Scotland Willsher spent four years teaching story-telling, drama and creative arts to primary schools in Fife before becoming a senior lecturer in Child Development at Stevenson College Edinburgh and retiring in 1977.

In retirement Willsher embraced the social scene in St Andrews, joining various local clubs and became an active conservation campaigner, fighting to protect the built heritage of the town, spearheading the campaign for the Crawford Arts Centre and as a stalwart of the local preservation trust. This keen interest in conservation would also be expressed nationally as she and her friend Bunty Mould travelled across Scotland recording, photographing and interpreting historic graveyards and the unique memorials within.

== Writings and graveyard research ==
Willsher published her first book in 1959, and a dozen more followed over the years; she wrote and published her final book at the age of 95, just two years before she died.

Her early books were intended either for young children or those that care for, raise and educate young children. In the introduction to her 1964 book, The Flying Jacket, Willsher clearly described the motivation behind and purpose of her book "Let’s not underestimate the appeal of nonsense, the delight of laughter, the fostering of a sense of humour!"

Beginning in 1978, she wrote, co-authored and edited a series of books on Scotland's graveyards, drawing considerable attention to these much-neglected historic sites. She took special interest in trades symbols and Green Men. Probably her most famous work, Understanding Scottish Graveyards, ran to 20 editions by 2006.

Willsher curated exhibitions of her photographs and would visit heritage groups and societies across the country and overseas to share her accumulated knowledge of these monuments and sites. In June 1993 she delivered a lecture on Scotland's graveyards to the 16th Annual Conference of the Association for Gravestone Studies at Connecticut College in New London.

Interviewing Willsher about her life and works for The Scotsman in 1996, following the recent publication of Scottish Epitaphs and Images from Scottish Graveyards, journalist Judith Woods was taken by the "evangelical enthusiasm for the emblems of death and the accompanying words which cast an epigrammatic light on mortality as it was perceived in centuries past" that infused Willsher's writing on graveyards.

Willsher told the journalist that her passion for the subject came "from a passion for archaeology rather than any religious perspective" adding:

"I was fascinated by the whole subject, I found the 17th and 18th-century carved stones in Scotland were better than any other country I have visited. They are carved on both sides, they are very ornate and they have a wider range of emblems. There isn't the same variation in England."

The precarious condition of many of Scotland's graveyards and the monuments therein was a primary motivation for Willsher's research, telling Woods:

"I think it's really important that people record their local graveyards and take photographs of the stones before they are lost to us, which I think they will be in the next 50 years.”

== Death ==
Willsher died, aged 96 on 25 February 2012. Her obituarist in the Fife Free Press described her as a "much Loved and respected St Andrean" who spent six decades at "the heart of the community" and who "was to the end a storyteller."

Her collected papers, covering the period 1970–1999, are held at Historic Environment Scotland Archives in Edinburgh. The archive includes photographs and manuscripts relating to her survey work of graveyards across Scotland and a collection of her own and others’ books on graves and graveyards.

== Publications ==
During her professional career, Willsher wrote books for and about children, following her retirement she devoted her research and writings on history, primarily graveyard research. In addition to articles for national and local media and local history newsletters, her works include:

- School Before Five. Faber and Faber, 1959.
- The Flying Jacket. Blackie & Son, 1964
- Tales of Professor Popoff. Peal Press, 1966
- Call me a person; A book on the education of pre-school children. Pergamon Press, 1969.
- Stones: A Guide to Some Remarkable Eighteenth Century Gravestones with Doreen Hunter. Canongate, nine editions published between 1978 and 1979.
- Understanding Scottish Graveyards: An Interpretative Approach. edited by Edwina Proudfoot.W. & R. Chambers, 1985 ISBN 0550204822 (20 editions have so far been published between 1985 and 2006).
- How to Record Scottish Graveyards: A Companion to Understanding Scottish Graveyards edited by Edwina Proudfoot. Council for British Archaeology, 1985.
- The Green Man in Scotland. Catalogue for a touring exhibition held in St Andrews and elsewhere in 1990.
- 'Adam and Eve Scenes on Kirkyard Monuments in the Scottish Lowlands' in Proceedings of the Society of Antiquaries of Scotland . 1992, Vol. 122 pp. 413–451.
- Scottish Epitaphs and Images from Scottish Graveyards. Canongate, 1996. ISBN 0862415918
- St Andrews: Ancient City in the twentieth century. Librario Publishing, 2003.
- St Andrews Citizens: Their Societies Past and Present. Librario Publishing, 2003.
- A Scottish Family – The Story of Eight Generations. Librario Publishing, 2005. ISBN 1904440398
- As Time Goes By. Librario Publishing, 2010. ISBN 1906775176

== Honours and awards ==
In 1989, the Association of Gravestone Studies awarded Willsher the Harriette Merrifield Forbes Award for outstanding contribution in the field of gravestone studies.

She was awarded an MBE in the 2000 New Year Honours list "For services to the Recording of Scotland's Graveyard Monuments".
