= Terra incognita (disambiguation) =

Terra incognita is a Latin phrase meaning 'unknown land', describing regions that have not been mapped or documented.

Terra incognita may also refer to:

- Terra Incognita (Gojira album)
- Terra Incognita (Juliette Lewis album), 2009
- Terra Incognita (Chris Whitley album),
- Terra Incognita: Ambient Works 1975 to Present, a compilation of Boyd Rice music
- "Terra Incognita" (short story), a 1931 short story by Vladimir Nabokov
- Terra incognita arts organisation + publishers, a not-for-profit visual arts and curatorial organisation
- Terra Incognita, an album (2011) by Coronatus
- Terra incognita (2002 film), a 2002 Lebanese-French drama film
- Terra Incognita (role-playing game), a 2001 role-playing game published
- Terra Incognita (sculpture), a 1995 sculpture by Ilan Averbuch
- Terra Incognita, a fantasy series by Kevin J. Anderson

== See also ==
- Tierra Incognita, an Argentinian television series
- Terra ignota ("unfamiliar land")
- Terra nullius ("no man's land")
- Terra Australis Incognita ("The unknown land of the South")
