= Alice B. Fogel =

American writer

Alice Fogel

Poet Laureate of New Hampshire
- In office 2014–2019

Personal details
- Born: Buffalo, New York, United States
- Education: Antioch College (BA); University of New Hampshire (MA)

Alice Fogel (born April 2, 1954) is an American poet, writer, and professor, who served as the state poet laureate of New Hampshire from 2014 to 2019.

== Education ==
She earned her Bachelor of Arts degree in art and literature from Antioch College and her Master of Arts from the University of New Hampshire.

== Career ==
She is author of six poetry collections, most recently "Nothing But: a series of indirect considerations on art & consciousness" (2021), "A Doubtful House" (2017), and Interval: Poems based on Bach's "Goldberg Variations" (2015), which won the Nicholas Schaffner Award for Music in Literature and the 2016 New Hampshire Literary Award in Poetry. Be That Empty (Harbor Mountain Press, 2007) was a poetry bestseller. She is also author of Strange Terrain: A Poetry Handbook for the Reluctant Reader (Hobblebush Books, 2009). Her work has appeared in numerous publications including Beloit Poetry Journal, Hotel Amerika, The Boston Review, The Inflectionist Review, Green Mountains Review, Iowa Review, JuxtaProse Literary Magazine, Pleiades, Ploughshares, Poetry Daily, Third Coast and The Washington Post. She has also contributed to several anthologies including The Best American Poetry 1993, Robert Hass's Poet's Choice, and Claiming the Spirit Within.

Fogel's honors include twelve Pushcart Prize nominations, Best of the Web, and a literature fellowship from the National Endowment for the Arts and the New England Poetry Club's Daniel Varoujan Award among other awards. She works one-on-one with neurodiverse students at Landmark College and teaches a variety of programs around the state of New Hampshire and elsewhere.

== Personal life ==
Alice Fogel was born in Buffalo, NY and raised in the Hudson Valley of NY State. She lives in Walpole, New Hampshire.

== Published works ==
=== Full-length poetry collections ===
- Nothing But: a series of indirect considerations on art & consciousness (Spuyten Duyvil Press, 2021)
- A Doubtful House (Bauhan Publishing, 2017)
- Interval: Poems Based on Bach's Goldberg Variations (Schaffner Press, 2015)
- Be That Empty (Harbor Mountain Press, 2007)
- I Love This Dark World (Zoland Books, 1996)
- Elemental (Zoland Books, 1993)

=== Non-fiction ===
- Strange Terrain: A Poetry Handbook for the Reluctant Reader (Hobblebush Books, 2009)
