= List of English-language literary presses =

Literary presses are publishing companies that publish books with a literary or artistic emphasis. This is a list of publishing companies and imprints whose primary emphasis is on literature and the arts. It does not include exclusively online publishers, academic publishers (who often publish very limited print runs, but for a different market), or businesses operating solely as printers, such as print-on-demand companies or vanity presses.

== List of English-language literary presses ==
- Algonquin Books
- And Other Stories
- Arte Publico Press
- Atlantic Books
- Bellevue Literary Press
- Blackwell Publishers
- Coffee House Press
- Dalkey Archive
- Etruscan Press
- Faber and Faber
- Fitzcarraldo Editions
- Four Walls Eight Windows
- Gival Press
- Graywolf Press
- Harbor Mountain Press
- Hippocampus Press
- Inanna Publications
- Legend Press
- Mercury House
- Milkweed Editions
- Moschatel Press
- New Directions Publishing
- New York Review Books
- New Rivers Press
- Picador, a division of Henry Holt and Company
- Press 53
- Santa Fe Writers Project
- Sarabande Books
- Small Beer Press
- Southwick House
- Tarpaulin Sky Press
- TSAR Publications
- Tupelo Press
- Turnstone Press
- Two Dollar Radio
- Unnamed Press
- Washington Writers Publishing House

== See also ==
- List of English-language small presses
- List of English-language book publishing companies
