= H. L. Hix =

American poet and academic (born 1960)

Harvey Lee Hix (born 1960) is an American poet and academic.

Hix is an author of books of poetry, criticism and essays and has been awarded a fellowship from the NEA (National Endowment for the Arts). He has also won the KCAI Teaching Excellence Award and the T. S. Eliot Prize for Poetry, which was a publication award from Truman State University Press for his volume Rational Numbers (2000). In 2006 he was a finalist for the National Book Award for Poetry.

He is a professor and former director of the creative writing MFA program at the University of Wyoming.

== Life ==
Hix received his bachelor's degree in English and philosophy from Belmont University in 1982, magna cum laude; his master's degree in philosophy from the University of Texas at Austin in 1985; and his doctorate in philosophy from the same institution in 1987.

He has taught in a number of positions at the Kansas City Art Institute — lecturer-in-residence, 1987–1988; assistant professor, 1988–1994; associate professor, 1994–1998; professor, 1998–2002; interim vice president for academic affairs, 1996–1998. Later he was vice president for academic affairs and professor at the Cleveland Institute of Art. He has been MFA program director and professor at the University of Wyoming since 2005.

== Books ==
=== Poetry ===
- Incident Light, Etruscan Press (2009) ISBN 978-0-974-5995-1-9
- Legible Heavens. Etruscan Press. 2008. ISBN 978-0-9797450-4-1.
- Chromatic, Etruscan Press (2006) ISBN 978-0-9745995-6-4
- Shadows of Houses, Etruscan Press (2005) ISBN 978-0-9745995-4-0
- Surely As Birds Fly, Truman State University Press (March 2002, paperback) ISBN 978-1-931112-05-5
- Rational Numbers, Truman State University Press (2000)
- Perfect Hell, Gibbs Smith (August 1996) ISBN 978-0-87905-780-0

=== Prose ===
- God Bless: A Political/Poetic Discourse. Etruscan Press. 2007. ISBN 978-0-9745995-7-1.
- As Easy As Lying: Essays on Poetry Etruscan Press (2002)
- Understanding William H. Gass. University of South Carolina Press. 2002. ISBN 978-1-57003-472-5.
- Understanding W. S. Merwin. University of South Carolina Press. 1997. ISBN 978-1-57003-154-0.
- Spirits Hovering Over the Ashes. SUNY Press. 1995. ISBN 978-0-7914-2515-2.
- Morte d'Author: An Autopsy, Temple University Press (1990)

=== Translations ===
- On the Way Home: An Anthology of Contemporary Estonian Poetry. translated with Jüri Talvet. Sarup & Sons. 2006. ISBN 978-81-7625-710-7.
- Jüri Talvet (2004). A Call for Cultural Symbiosis: Meditations from U. Guernica Editions. ISBN 978-1-55071-226-1.
- City of Ash, Eugenijus Ališanka, Northwestern University Press (2000) ISBN 978-0-8101-1783-9

=== Edited books ===
- New Voices: Contemporary Poetry from the United States. Irish Pages. 2008. ISBN 978-0-9544257-9-1.
- H. L. Hix, ed. (2004). Wild and whirling words: a poetic conversation. Etruscan Press. ISBN 978-0-9745995-0-2.
- A Casebook on The Tunnel, Web-published, Dalkey Archive (2000)
- Poets At Large: 25 Poets in 25 Homes, Helicon Nine (1997)
