= Talvet =

Talvet is an Estonian surname. Notable people with the surname include:

- Jüri Talvet (born 1945), Estonian poet and academic
- Malle Talvet-Mustonen (born 1955), Estonian diplomat, literary translator and poet
