= Small press =

Publisher with low annual sales revenue and/or few titles

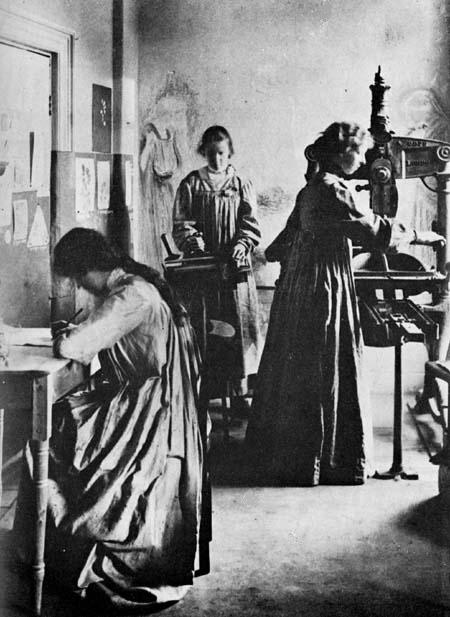
The Dun Emer Press in 1903 with Elizabeth Yeats working the hand press

A small press is a publisher with annual sales below a certain level or below a certain number of titles published. The terms "indie publisher" and "independent press" and others are sometimes used interchangeably. However, when a distinction is drawn, there are about 100,000 small presses and about one million independent presses.

Independent press is generally defined as publishers that are not part of large conglomerates or multinational corporations. Even when owned by a larger business, an independent press is allowed to choose which books to publish, and the business will survive or fail as a result of how well those books sell. Many small presses rely on specialization in genre fiction, poetry, or limited-edition books or magazines, but there are also thousands that focus on niche non-fiction markets.

Other terms for small press, sometimes distinguished from each other and sometimes used interchangeably, are small publishers, independent publishers, or indie presses.

Independent publishers (as defined above) made up about half of the market share of the book publishing industry in the United States in 2007. The majority of small presses are independent or indie publishers, meaning that they are separate from the handful of major publishing house conglomerates, such as Random House or Hachette.

== Characteristics ==
Since the profit margins for small presses can be narrow, many are driven by other motives, including the desire to help disseminate literature with only a small likely market. Many presses are also associated with crowdfunding efforts that help connect authors with readers.

Small presses tend to fill the niches that larger publishers neglect. They can focus on regional titles, narrow specializations and niche genres. They can also make up for commercial clout by creating a reputation for academic knowledge, vigorously pursuing prestigious literature prizes and spending more effort nurturing the careers of new authors. At its most minimal, small-press production consists of chapbooks. This role can now be taken on by desktop publishing and web sites. This still leaves a continuum of small-press publishing: from specialist periodicals, short runs or print-to-order of low-demand books, to fine art books and limited editions of collector's items printed to high standards.

Unlike a vanity press or self-publishing service, a small press rarely publishes books written by the owner or publisher. Instead, these are small businesses, often with only a few employees, who select books written by other authors.

== Micro-presses ==
A distinction is also made between small presses and micro-presses. A micro-press can be defined as a publisher that produces chapbooks and other small books on a very small scale (e.g. 50 copies of one book per year). It can also be defined in terms of revenue. Micro-presses are often run as a hobby or part-time job because of their low profits. They may not produce enough profit to support their owners.

In Canada, these are considered small press publishers, but the standard small press book run is accepted at 300 copies of a chapbook and 500 or more copies of a spine-bound book. Under these criteria, small press publishers are eligible for grants from the Ontario Arts Council and the Canada Council.

== Not to be confused with ==
Small presses should not be confused with self-publishing presses (sometimes called "vanity presses"). Self-publishing or subsidy presses usually require payment by authors, or a minimum purchase of copies. By comparison, small presses make their profits by selling books to consumers, rather than selling services to authors or selling a small number of copies to the author's friends.

Small presses should not be confused with printers. Small presses are traditional publishers, which means that they engage in a book selection process, along with editing, marketing and distribution. Small presses also enter into a contract with the author, often paying royalties for being allowed to sell the book. Publishers own the copies they have printed, but usually do not own the copyright to the book itself. In contrast, printers merely print a book, and sometimes offer limited distribution if they are a POD printing press. Printers are generally highly non-selective. They will accept nearly anyone who can pay the cost of printing. They rarely offer editing or marketing. Printers do not own the copies that are printed, and they do not pay royalties.

Book packagers combine aspects of small presses and printers, but they are technically neither small presses nor printers.

== History ==
Small presses became distinguishable from jobbing printers toward the end of the nineteenth century. Their roots lie within the Arts and Crafts movement, particularly the Kelmscott Press. The use of small letterpress machines by amateur printers increased alongside the mechanization of commercial printing. Later, advances in practical lithography made small-press publication much easier. The 1960s and 1970s are considered the golden age of small presses in the United States. The unprecedented proliferation of small, independent publishers during this period was a result of the so-called "Mimeo Revolution" and the widespread availability of affordable, do-it-yourself reproduction technologies.

The growth of small presses has been driven by the introduction of digital printing, especially print-on-demand technology. Combined with Internet-based marketing, digital typesetting, and design tools, the rise of eBooks and new printing technologies has lowered economic barriers to entry. This shift allows new publishers to enter the industry and serves a wider variety of niche markets. A notable boom in small-press publishing has been observed since the 2008 economic crisis.

== By continent ==
=== Oceania ===
==== Australia ====
Small presses have played a significant part historically in recognising new voices and publishing notable works of literary fiction in Australia, but the market was seen as a tough one in 1999, despite about 80 per cent of the Australian Publishers Association being small book publishers (defined as those with less than AU$2m), nearly all Australian-owned.

In recent years, though, the small publishers have especially made gains as big publishers have backed away from publishing literary works. Small press publications have won some of the greatest literary prizes, including the Stella Prize, the Prime Minister's Literary Award for Fiction and the Miles Franklin Literary Award. There was a strong upward trend in the number of titles published by small presses and shortlisted for the Miles Franklin and the PM's Fiction Awards in the two years preceding 2017.

The Small Press Network (SPN), located at the Wheeler Centre in Melbourne, represents small and independent publishers in Australia. The network promotes independent publishing and supports diversity within the industry "as a vital component of Australian literary culture". Founded in 2006, it has grown to represent more than 140 members in Australia and New Zealand. Its members include such publishers as the Griffith Review, National Library of Australia Publishing, Scribe and Wakefield Press, as well as many smaller publishers.

=== Africa ===
==== Kenya ====
The 1960s marked a significant period for small presses in Kenya following the country’s independence from Britain in 1963. During this period and into the 1970s, small-press publications played a crucial role in reflecting social and political trends, such as urban corruption and the legacy of colonial rule.

Universities, notably the University of Nairobi, were pivotal in shaping this literary culture. Student publications served as platforms for early creative writing experimentation by writers who later became well-known. Zuka: A Journal of East African Creative Writing, founded by the East African Literature Bureau in 1967, published authors such as Taban Lo Liyong, Ngũgĩ wa Thiong'o, Angus Calder, and Okot p'Bitek.

== See also ==
- Amateur press association
- Association of Little Presses
- Author mill
- Bill Bird
- Independent Publishers Guild (UK)
- Independent Publishers Group (US distributors)
- List of English-language book publishing companies
- List of English-language literary presses
- List of English-language small presses
- List of literary magazines
- List of self-publishing companies
- Literary magazine
- Predatory open-access publishing
- Private press
- Samizdat
- Small Press Distribution
- WSFA Small Press Award
