= Elizabeth Robinson =

American poet

Elizabeth Robinson (born 1961, Denver, Colorado) is an American poet, pastor, editor, social worker, and former professor. She has written 21 collections of poetry, most recently Being Modernists Together (2026), a hybrid work that reimagines artistic and writerly relations in the early 20th century, Vulnerability Index (2026), a hybrid text that attends to the experiences of the unhoused, and Rendered Paradise (2024), an ekphrastic collaboration with Susanne Dyckman on three women artists. She has also brought numerous works of other poets to print through her various editing activities.

== Life ==
Robinson grew up in Southern California and did her undergraduate degree at Bard College, where she worked with Robert Kelly, Ed Sanders, and Robert Duncan. She then earned an MA at Brown University, where she worked with Keith Waldrop and C.D. Wright, and later went on to earn a Master of Divinity and an MA in bioethics and the Pacific School of Religion. She has been ordained by the United Church of Christ and is currently senior pastor at the Orinda Community Church in the California Bay Area.

== Critical Reception ==
Robinson’s work is recognized as formally inventive and spiritually charged. Having studied with Robert Kelly and, briefly, with Robert Duncan, her work shows an affinity with the Black Mountain poets. In his book jacket comment for Apprehend, Robert Creeley wrote:

"What stays a marvel in this impeccable poet’s writing is her determination to bridge between the physically given world and that other we gloss with words, yet apprehend insistently as the defining presence of our lives themselves. She is in that way also a translator, reading what otherwise our “realities” would mistake, cover with layers of distracting judgment or else altogether discard. I feel a securing confidence in her poems—as though she had given me her hand and now I can follow safe in her own attention."

Her books have been described as “cohesive and meticulously curated collections… project books, or book-length concepts, … Condensed fairy tales and fables, surrealist visions and daydreams, sometimes speaking with a past source text, sometimes pulling fragments together…” “Poems,” Robinson says, “can stutter, pause, partake of other rhythms. They can leave a lot unsaid. For me, that has a lot to do with moving against expectation, fragmenting or removing material, breaking lines, adding page breaks, and overall embracing the page as a visual entity.” Marisa Siegel, writing in The Rumpus, has noted that “Robinson’s work belongs to a school of writing all its own. Certainly a part of the lyric tradition but also influenced by a spirit definitively experimental in its nature, Robinson’s poems are both studies in intensely felt human emotion and in the alternatively slippery and concrete ways in which words can function.” Her work has appeared widely in national and international literary reviews such as Bennington Review, Conjunctions, The Iowa Review, The Colorado Review, The Denver Quarterly, Poetry Salzburg Review, New American Writing, Seneca Review and has been included in numerous anthologies, including Postmodern American Poetry (Norton, 2013), American Hybrid (Norton, 2009), and The Best of Fence (Fence, 2009).

== Editing ==
In 1998, Robinson co-founded EtherDome Chapbooks with poet Colleen Lookingbill. The press published 21 chapbooks by experimentally oriented female-identified poets who had not previously published books, and was the first to publish such poets as Kate Greenstreet and Stacy Szymaszek. That project culminated in 2012 with the anthology As If It Fell from the Sun: an EtherDome Anthology.

With Jennifer Phelps, she co-edited a critical anthology of contemporary women’s poetry titled Quo Anima: Innovation and Spirituality in Contemporary Women’s Poetry, published by University of Akron Press.

In 2000, with Leonard Brink (the founder of the press) and Beth Anderson, Robinson began co-editing Instance Press. The press continued until 2013 with an evolving group of editors, including Laura Sims, Stacy Szymaszek, and Susanne Dyckman. The press published a variety of American innovative poetry collections including books by Keith Waldrop, Beverly Dahlen, Jack Collom, and Donna Stonecipher.

She has also served as an editor of the literary periodicals 26 and Pallaksch Pallaksch.

== Career Trajectory ==
Robinson has had a varied vocational life. After receiving an MA in creative writing from Brown University, she lived and worked for a year at the Harambee Center in northwest Pasadena, a Christian intentional community working for racial justice and reconciliation. Following that, she was a visiting professor at the University of Oklahoma, where she became involved with ecumenical student ministries. These experiences prompted her to pursue a Master of Divinity. After a year of study in Chicago, she returned to Oklahoma as an interim campus minister before moving to the Bay Area to study at the Pacific School of Religion. Robinson intended to work as a hospital chaplain, specifically with people living with AIDS, but after marrying and having two sons, she found employment teaching creative writing in the Bay Area at University of San Francisco, San Francisco State University, and California College of the Arts. She later taught at the University of Colorado, Boulder and Naropa Universities with visiting semesters at the Iowa Writers Workshop and the University of Montana (where she was twice the Hugo Fellow). Eventually, Robinson began working with the unhoused population in Boulder, Colorado—first at a meal program, then in a day shelter, and finally as the “Homeless Navigator” at the Boulder Municipal Court, where she worked with chronically unhoused individuals to connect them with resources, medical care, and housing. In her current capacity of senior pastor of the Orinda Community Church, she works on various social justice projects, accompanying an immigrant family seeking asylum and working with her congregation to build low income senior housing on their property. She has also taught a variety of creative writing courses for over ten years with the Lighthouse Writers Workshop, based in Denver, Colorado.

== Awards ==
- 2017 Fellow at the Bridwell Library, Perkins School of Theology, Southern Methodist University
- 2016 Fellow at the Maison Dora Maar, Menerbes, France
- 2012 Grant from the Boomerang Foundation
- 2008 Foundation for Contemporary Arts, Grants to Artists Award
- 2002 Fence Modern Poets Prize for Apprehend
- 2001 National Poetry Series for Pure Descent

Winner of Gertrude Stein Awards for Innovative Poetry, 1994, 1995, 2006

- 1987 Baxter Hathaway Prize for a long poem, Epoch Magazine

Recipient of residencies at the MacDowell Colony, the Djerassi Resident Artists Program, and the Headlands Center for the Arts

== Published works ==
Full-length Collections

- Being Modernists Together, Solid Objects Press, 2026, ISBN 978-1-7332323-5-7
- Vulnerability Index, Northwestern University/Curbstone Books, 2025, ISBN 978-0-8101-4920-5
- Rendered Paradise, coauthored with Susanne Dyckman, Apogee Press, 2024, ISBN 978-1-7331375-5-3
- Thirst & Surfeit, Threadsuns Press, 2023, ISBN 978-1-7346911-4-6
- Excursive, Roof Books, 2023, ISBN 978-1-931824-76-7
- Rumor, Free Verse Editions/Parlor Press, 2018. ISBN 978-1-60235-153-0
- Dot’s Diner, with Jack Collom, 2017, Further Other Bookworks. ISBN 978-0-9893132-7-8
- On Ghosts (Solid Objects, 2013) Finalist: Los Angeles Times Book Award. ISBN 978-0-9844142-6-0 I
- Blue Heron (Fort Collins CO, Center for Literary Publishing, 2013) ISBN 978-1-885635-29-7
- Counterpart (Boise ID: Ahsahta Press, 2012) ISBN 978-1-934103-34-0
- Three Novels (Omnidawn, 2011) ISBN 978-1-890650-51-3
- Also Known As (Apogee Press, 2009) ISBN 978-0-9787667-5-7
- Inaudible Trumpeters (Harbor Mountain Press, 2008) ISBN 978-0-9786009-0-7
- The Orphan & Its Relations. Fence Books. 2008. ISBN 978-1-934200-16-2.
- Under That Silky Roof. Burning Deck Press. 2006. ISBN 978-1-886224-71-1.
- Apostrophe. Apogee Press. 2006. ISBN 978-0-9744687-9-2.
- Apprehend. Apogee Press. 2003. ISBN 978-0-9713189-5-3.
- Pure Descent. Sun & Moon Press. 2003. ISBN 978-1-55713-410-3.
- Harrow. Omnidawn Publishing. 2001. ISBN 978-1-890650-07-0.
- House Made of Silver. Kelsey St. Press. 2000. ISBN 978-0-932716-51-4.
- In the sequence of falling things. Paradigm Press. 1990. ISBN 978-0-945926-20-7.
- Bed of lists. K Press. 1990. ISBN 978-0-932716-25-5.

Chapbooks

- "Reply" (Pavement Saw Press, 2011)
- "Rumor" (Belladonna Press, 2008)
- "The Golem" (Phylum Press, 2007)
- Carrington (Hot Whiskey Press, 2008)
- My Name Happens Also (Burning Deck Press, 1987)
