= Claudio Guillén =

Spanish writer and literary scholar

The Most Excellent Claudio Guillén
- Born: Claudio Guillén Cahen; 2 September 1924; Paris, France
- Died: 27 January 2007 (aged 82); Madrid, Spain

Seat m of the Real Academia Española
- In office 2 February 2003 – 27 January 2007
- Preceded by: Rafael Alvarado Ballester
- Succeeded by: José María Merino

Claudio Guillén Cahen (2 September 1924 in Paris – 27 January 2007 in Madrid) was a Spanish writer and literary scholar.

== Early life and education ==
Claudio Guillén was born in Paris in 1924. His father was the poet Jorge Guillén, a prominent poet of the Generation of '27 and a scholar and literary critic as well. His mother was Germaine Cahen, Jorge Guillén's first wife. At the age of fifteen, after the Spanish Civil War, he and his family were forced into exile in the USA. He studied in Seville, Paris and the USA, where he attended Williams College. He was a volunteer during World War II on the side of De Gaulle. Among his instructors, there were some Spanish republican intellectuals: Francisco García Lorca (brother of Federico García Lorca, who dedicated his poem "Of the Dark Doves" to Guillén), José Ferrater Mora and Joaquín Casalduero. He studied also with Werner Wilhelm, Amado Alonso and read comprehensively the works of Harry Levin. He obtained his PhD degree from Harvard in 1953 and he specialized in comparative literature.

== Academic career ==
Between 1965 and 1985, Claudio Guillén was a professor of comparative literature at the University of California, San Diego, Princeton University and Harvard University, where he met Roman Jakobson. He was a visiting fellow in Germany, Italy, Brazil, among others; and speaker at conferences, seminars and courses in China, the USSR and several Eastern European countries. He frequented some circles of exiled Spanish intellectuals and kept in contact with Ángel del Río, Américo Castro and Pedro Salinas.

His focus of research was the novel and poetry of the 16th century, the poetry of 20th century, genre theory and literary history. He published several books and over a hundred articles.

== Return to Spain ==
Claudio Guillén returned to Spain in 1982. He had an intensive academic activity since this same year, when he became professor of Comparative Literature at the Universidad Autónoma de Barcelona. Between 1984 and 1989, he served as director of the Spanish Society of General and Comparative Literature and was an advisor at the Fundación Juan March. In 1996, he promoted the creation of the Foundation Generation of '27, for the study of the unpublished texts of the poets and authors of that generation. In 1999 an international congress in his honor was celebrated; the essays from that congress were published in a volume entitled Sin fonteras (Without Borders). That same year, he was awarded the National Prize of Essay, for his Múltiples moradas (Multifarious Dwellings). Guillén was elected to seat m of the Real Academia Española, he took up his seat on 2 February 2003.

He had recently finished a book about Goethe and was working on the edition of his father's letters when he died at the age of 82 in Madrid.
