= José María Merino =

Spanish novelist

The Most Excellent José María Merino
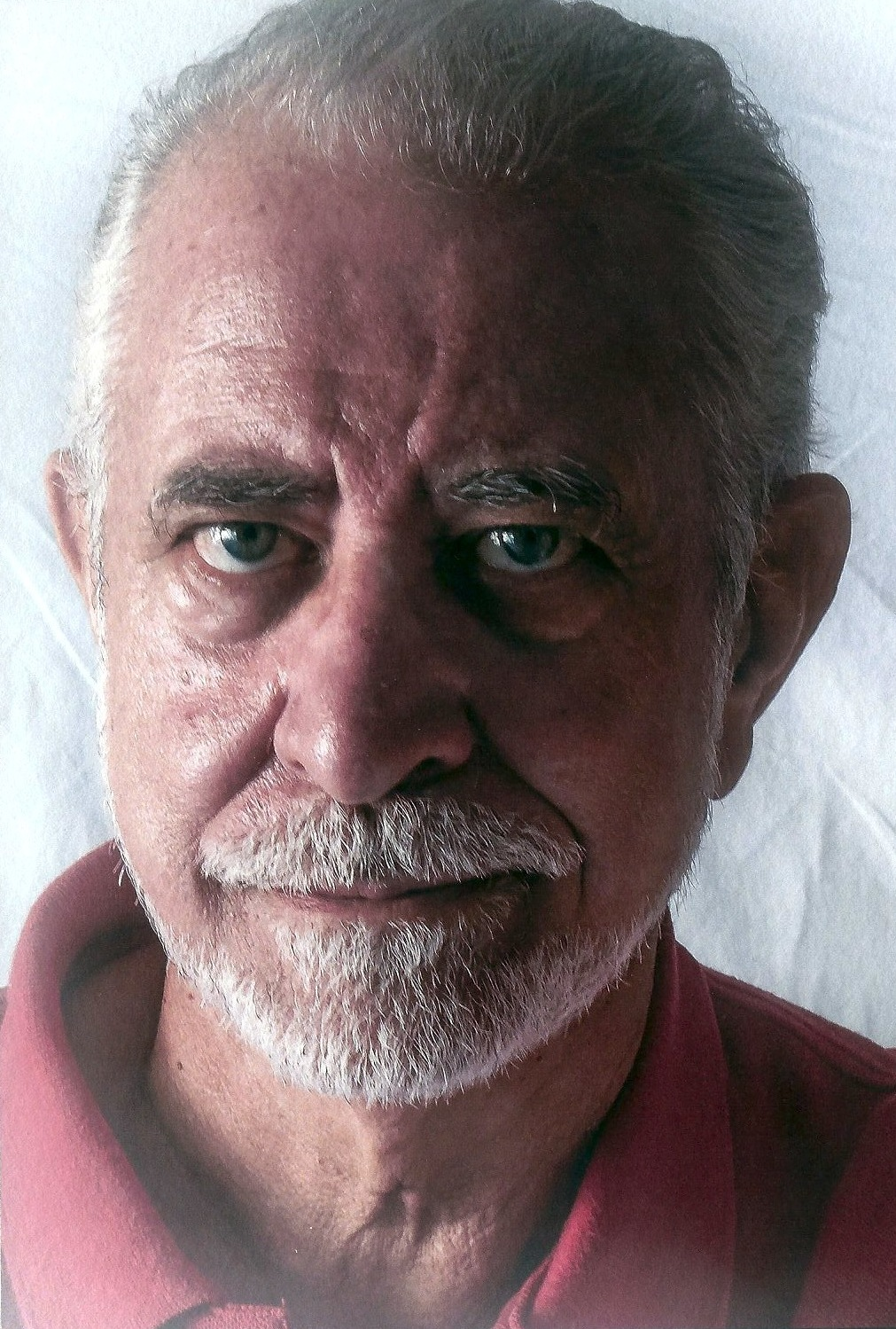
- Born: José María Merino; 5 March 1941 (age 85); A Coruña, Spain

Seat m of the Real Academia Española
- Incumbent
- Assumed office 19 April 2009 (Note: Elected on 27 March 2008)
- Preceded by: Claudio Guillén

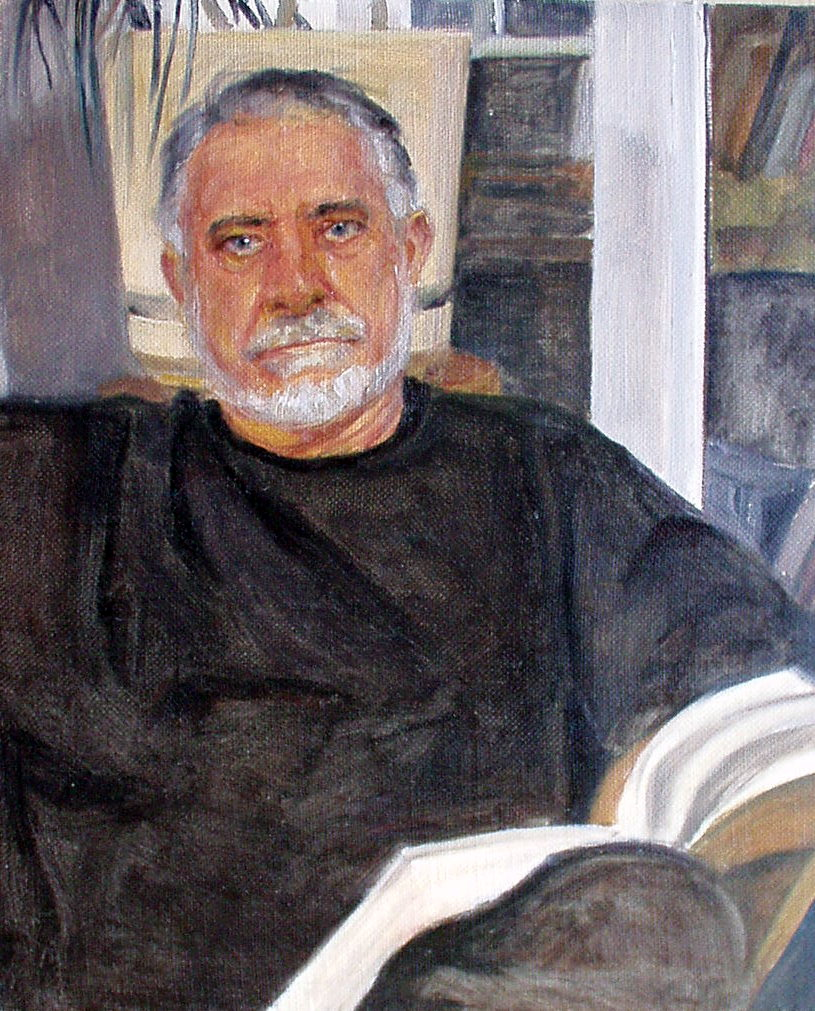
Jose María Merino, portrait by Felix de la Concha

José María Merino is a Spanish novelist born in A Coruña, Galicia on 5 March 1941. He is the father of two daughters, María and Ana, both of them university professors. (Ana Merino is also a poet.) He lived for several years in León and currently lives in Madrid. Best known for his novels and short stories, he is also a poet and a travel writer.

His literary production is equal both in terms of quantity and quality. He cultivates all narrative forms, poetry, and literary essay. He usually writes short-story, he has edited important collections of short-stories and tales. Mr. Merino is also an experienced teacher, someone who enjoys sharing his expertise with younger writers and students. He has conducted numerous workshops and creative writing courses and seminars in different Universities and Writing Schools, such as Dartmouth College (Hanover), the Universidad Complutense (Madrid), Universidad Carlos III (Madrid), Universidad International Menéndez y Pelayo (Santander), Escuela de Escritores Alonso Quijano or La Escuela de Letras.

Merino was elected to Seat m of the Real Academia Española on 27 March 2008, he took up his seat on 19 April 2009.

== Books ==
=== Novels ===
- El río del Edén 2013 National Novel Prize (Spain)
- El lugar sin culpa (Ed. Alfaguara 2007) Torrente Ballester Award
- El heredero (Ed, Alfaguara, 2003). Ramón Gómez de la Serna Award
- Novelas del mito ( Ed. Alfaguara, 2000). (Compilation: El caldero de oro, La orilla oscura y El centro del aire)
- Los invisibles (Ed. Espasa-Calpe, 2000)
- Las visiones de Lucrecia ( Ed. Alfaguara, 1996). Miguel Delibes Award
- Las crónicas mestizas ( Ed. Alfaguara, 1992). (Compilation: El oro de los sueños, La tierra del tiempo perdido y Las lágrimas del sol)
- Los trenes del verano -No soy un libro ( Ed. Siruela, 1992). National Award of Youth Literature
- El centro del aire (Ed. Alfaguara, 1991)
- Las lágrimas del sol (Ed. Alfaguara, 1989)
- La tierra del tiempo perdido (Ed. Alfaguara, 1987)
- El oro de los sueños (Ed. Alfaguara, 1986)
- La orilla oscura (Ed. Alfaguara, 1985). Critics National Award
- El caldero de oro (Ed. Alfaguara, 1981)
- Novela de Andrés Choz (Ed. Novelas y Cuentos 1976). Award for the best novel: Novelas y Cuentos Award

=== Short stories collections ===
- La glorieta de los fugitivos (Ed. Páginas de Espuma, 2007)
- Cuentos del libro de la noche (Ed. Alfaguara, 2005)
- Cuentos de los días raros (Ed. Alfaguara, 2004)
- Días imaginarios (Seix Barral 2002). NH Award of short stories to the year best short stories book published
- La memoria tramposa (Edilesa, 1999)
- Cuatro nocturnos (Ed. Alfaguara 1999)
- Cincuenta cuentos y una fábula. Obra breve 1982-1997 (Ed. Alfaguara 1997)
- Cuentos del Barrio del Refugio (Ed. Alfaguara 1994)
- El viajero perdido (Ed. Alfaguara 1990)
- Artrópodos y Hadanes (Ollero y Ramos, 1987)
- Cuentos del reino secreto (Ed. Alfaguara 1982)

=== Collections of literary essays and articles ===
- Ficción continua (Seix Barral, 2004)
- Silva leonesa (Breviarios de la Calle del Pez 1998)

=== Memoirs ===
- Tres semanas de mal dormir (Seix Barral, 2006)
- Intramuros (Edilesa, 1998)

=== Poetry ===
- Cumpleaños lejos de casa. Poesía reunida. Seix Barral, Barcelona, 2006
- Cumpleaños lejos de casa. Obra poética completa. Endymion, Madrid, 1987
- Mírame Medusa y otros poemas. Endymion, Madrid, 1984
- Cumpleaños lejos de casa. Provincia, León, 1973
- Sitio de Tarifa. Helios, Madrid, 1972

=== Books for children ===
- Adiós al cuaderno de hojas blancas (Anaya, 1998)
- Regreso al cuaderno de hojas blancas (Anaya, 1997)
- El cuaderno de hojas blancas (Anaya, 1996)
- La edad de la aventura (Ed. Alfaguara, 1995)

=== Collaborative work ===
- Los narradores cautivos (Alfaguara, 1999). Novel. With Jesús F. Martínez and Antonio Martínez Menchén
- Sabino Ordás, Las cenizas del Fénix (Calambur, 1985). Journalistic articles with Juan Pedro Aparicio and Luis Mateo Díez
- León, traza y memoria (1984). Book of Art. With Luis Mateo Díez and Antonio Gamoneda
- Los caminos del Esla (Everest, 1980). Travels Book. With Juan Pedro Aparicio
- Parnasillo Provincial de poetas apócrifos (Papalaguinda poética, 1975). With Agustín Delgado and Luis Mateo Díez

=== Editor of anthologies ===
- Leyendas españolas de todos los tiempos. Una memoria soñada (Temas de hoy, 2000)
- Los mejores relatos españoles del siglo XX (Alfaguara, 1998)
- Cien años de cuentos españoles en castellano (1898–1998) (Alfaguara, 1998)
