= Bruce Bond =

American writer

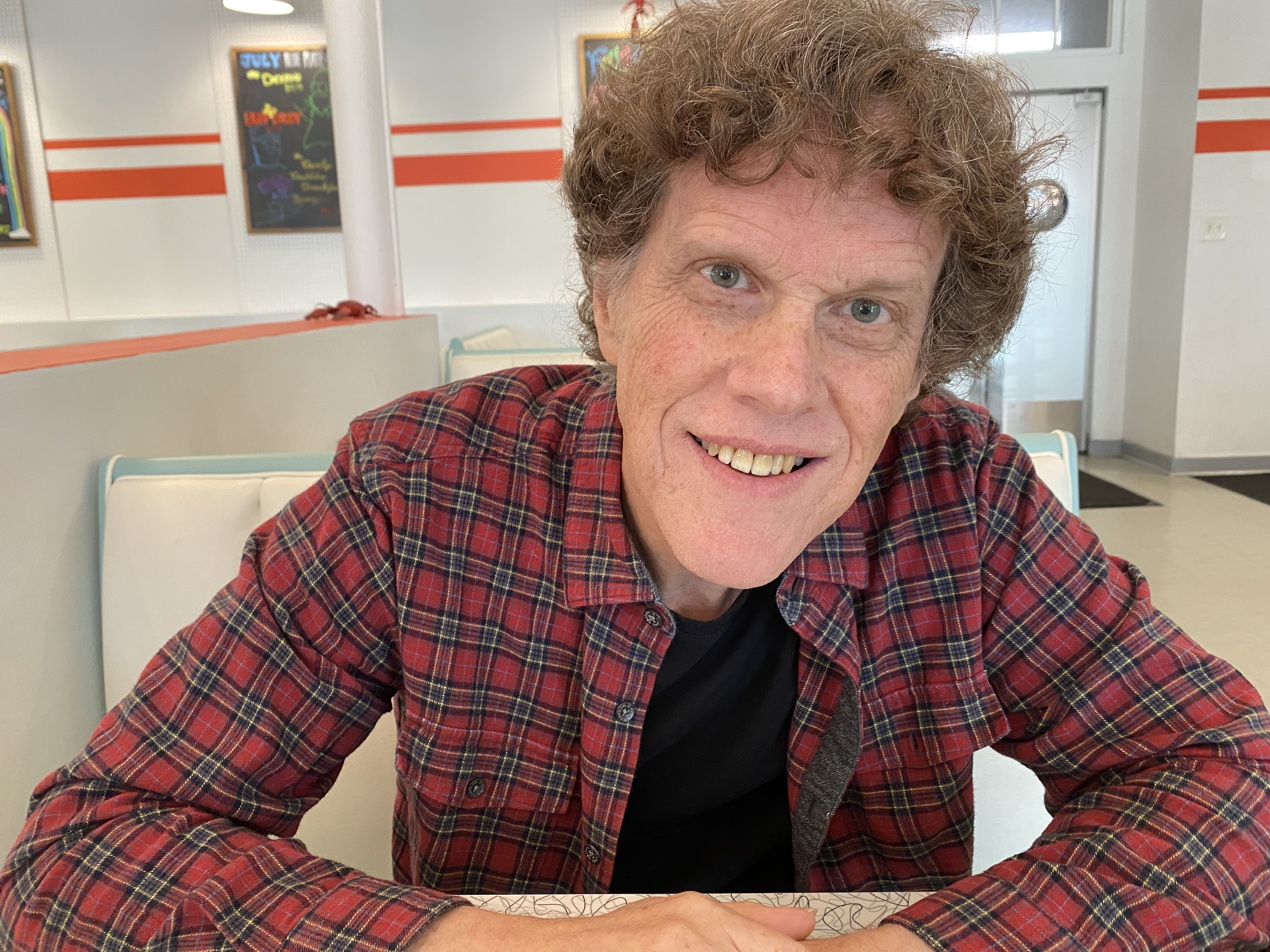
- Bruce Bond
- Born: 25 June 1954
- Occupation: poet

Bruce Bond (born June 25, 1954) is an American poet and creative writing educator at the University of North Texas.

== Formal education and academic career ==
Bond earned a Bachelor of Arts degree in English from Pomona College, a Master of Arts degree in English from Claremont Graduate School, and a Masters in Music Performance degree from the Lamont School of Music of the University of Denver. Bond spends his free time performing jazz and classical guitar in Texas. In 1987, he earned a PhD in English from the University of Denver. Since then, he has taught at the University of Kansas, Wichita State University, Wilfrid Laurier University (in Canada), and the University of North Texas, where he currently is a Regents Professor of English and Poetry Editor, with Corey Marks, of American Literary Review.

== Works ==
Poetry

1. Lunette, Green Linden Press (2024).
2. Therapon (with Dan Beachy-Quick), Tupelo Press (2023).
3. Choreomania, Mad Hat Press (2023).
4. Invention of the Wilderness, Louisiana State University Press (2023).
5. Liberation of Dissonance, Schaffner Press (2022). Nicholas Schaffner Award for Literature in Music.
6. Patmos, University of Massachusetts Press (2021). Juniper Award.
7. Blackout Starlight: New and Selected Poems 1997-2015, Louisiana State University Press (2017).
8. Behemoth, Criterion Books (2021). New Criterion Poetry Prize.
9. The Calling, Parlor Press (2021).
10. Scar, Etruscan Press (2020).
11. Words Written Against the Walls of the City, Louisiana State University Press (2019).
12. Frankenstein’s Children, Lost Horse Press (2018).
13. Rise and Fall of the Lesser Sun, Elixir Press (2018). Elixir Press Poetry Award.
14. Dear Reader, Parlor Press (2018).
15. Blackout Starlight: New and Selected Poems 1997-2015, Louisiana State University Press (2017).
16. Sacrum, Four Way Books (2017).
17. Gold Bee, Southern Illinois University Press (2016). Helen C. Smith Award, Crab Orchard Award.
18. Black Anthem, University of Tampa Press (2016). Tampa Poetry Prize.
19. For the Lost Cathedral, Louisiana State University Press (2015).
20. The Other Sky, Etruscan Press (2015). Finalist: Helen C. Smith Award.
21. Choir of the Wells: A Tetralogy of New Books, Etruscan Press (2013) OCLC 812258481
22. The Visible, Louisiana State University Press (2012) OCLC 745765999
23. Peal, Etruscan Press (2009) OCLC 318876943
24. Blind Rain, Louisiana State University Press (2008) OCLC 646757924
  2010 Finalist, The Poets' Prize, Academy of American Poets
  Finalist, Natalie Ornish Prize, Texas Institute of Letters
25. Cinder, Etruscan Press (2003) OCLC 52138027
  Finalist, Best Book of Poetry, Texas Institute of Letters
26. The Throats of Narcissus University of Arkansas Press (2001) OCLC 45799620
27. Radiography, BOA Editions (1997) OCLC 37904942
  1998 Natalie Ornish Prize, Texas Institute of Letters
28. The Anteroom of Paradise, Quarterly Review of Literature: Poetry Series 10, Vol. 30 (1991) OCLC 316588200, 779970923, 69104327 OCLC 225900260, 38487763
  1991 Colladay Award, Quarterly Review of Literature
29. Independence Days, Woodley Press (1990) OCLC 23475982
  Robert Gross Award, Woodley Press, Washburn University

=== Criticism ===
- Plurality and the Poetics of Self, Palgrave (2019).
- Immanent Distance: Poetry and the Metaphysics of the Near at Hand, University of Michigan Press (2015).

Bond's poetry has been published by The Best American Poetry, The Yale Review, Beloit Poetry Journal, The Georgia Review, Raritan, The New Republic, Virginia Quarterly Review, Poetry, The Southern Review, and other journals and anthologies.

== Honors ==
Bond has received numerous honors, including the 2009 Kesterson Award for Outstanding Graduate Teaching, University of North Texas. He is a past fellow of the NEA (2001–2002), the Texas Commission on the Arts (1998), the UNT Institute for the Advancement of the Arts (2010), Bread Loaf Writers' Conference (1993; assisted Donald Justice), Wesleyan Writers' Conference, Wesleyan University (1996; assisted Henry Taylor), Sewanee Writers' Conference (1994; assisted Anthony Hecht), the MacDowell Foundation (1993), the Yaddo Corporation (1992), Virginia Center for the Creative Arts (1989), and other organizations.

- Richard Snyder Prize (2022) Vault https://www.ashlandpoetrypress.com/blog/2022/09/06/2022-richard-snyder-memorial-publication-prize-winner-is-bruce-bond
- Juniper Prize (2022) Patmos https://www.umasspress.com/9781625345615/patmos/
- New Criterion Prize (2021) Behemoth https://www.amazon.com/Behemoth-Bruce-Bond/dp/1641771445
- Schaffner Award for Literature in Music (2022) Liberation of Dissonance https://schaffnerpress.com/books/liberation-of-dissonance/
- Meridian Editors Award in Poetry (from Meridian, 2020)
- Meringoff Prize (from Association of Literary Scholars, Critic, and Writers) (2019) https://alscw.org/news/winners-2018-alscw-meringoff-writing-awards/
- Lawrence Goldstein Award (2018) Michigan Quarterly https://sites.lsa.umich.edu/mqr/2018/04/mqr-announces-2017-literary-prizes/
- Helen C. Smith Award (from Texas Institute of Letters) (2017) Gold Bee https://www.texasinstituteofletters.org/archives/TIL-awards-complete-history.pdf
- L.E. Philabaum Award Blackout Starlight https://lsupress.org/books/detail/blackout-starlight/
- River Styx International Poetry Award (2017) http://www.riverstyx.org/submit/poetry-contest/
- Elixir Press Poetry Award (2017) Rise and Fall of the Lesser Sun Gods http://elixirpress.com/rise-and-fall-of-the-lesser-sun-gods
- Tampa Review Prize for Poetry (2017) Black Anthem https://www.amazon.com/Black-Anthem-Bruce-Bond/dp/1597321346
- Lynda Hull Memorial Award (2017) Crazyhorse https://swamp-pink.cofc.edu/prizes/2017-crazyhorse-prize-winners-finalists/
- Crab Orchard Open Competition Book Prize (2016) Gold Bee http://siupress.com/series/crab-orchard-series-poetry?page=2 http://siupress.com/books/978-0-8093-3532-9
- Knightville Poetry Award (from The New Guard, 2012)
