= Ana Merino =

- Born: June , 1971; Madrid, Spain
- Occupations: Poet, writer, playwright, professor
- Writing career
- Genres: Poetry, theatre, essay, columns
- Notable work: El mapa de los afectos
- Notable awards: Premio Nadal (2020); Premio Adonáis de Poesía (1994); Premio Fray Luis de León (2003)

Ana Merino Norverto (born June 1971) is a Spanish poet, novelist, playwright, essayist and comics scholar. She won the Premio Nadal in 2020 for her novel El mapa de los afectos.

She belongs to the so-called "Generation of 2000" of Spanish poetry, and is the daughter of writer and academic José María Merino. Merino earned degrees in Modern and Contemporary History from the Autonomous University of Madrid, an MA in Columbus, Ohio, and a PhD from the University of Pittsburgh with a dissertation on Ibero-American comics. She is a professor at the University of Iowa, where she founded the MFA in Spanish Creative Writing, serving as its first director from 2011 to 2018. Merino is also a columnist for El País.

== Biography ==
Ana Merino was born in Madrid in 1971, daughter of José María Merino. Ana Merino was between 2004 and 2009 an Assistant Professor of Spanish at Dartmouth College. She left Dartmouth in 2009 to create and develop the Spanish MFA at the University of Iowa that was inaugurated on 2011. She is a Full Professor of Spanish Creative Writing and Cultural Studies at The University of Iowa and was the founder director of their MFA in Spanish Creative Writing between 2011 and 2018. She has published two scholarly books on comics: El Comic Hispánico (Cátedra, 2003),Diez ensayos para pensar el cómic (Eolas, 2017), and a critical monograph on Chris Ware (Sinsentido 2005), a youth novel "El hombre de los dos corazones" (Anaya, 2009) and nine books of poetry, and was a recipient of the Adonais and Fray Luis de Leon awards for poetry. She was awarded the Diario de Avisos Award for best critical short articles about comics for the Spanish literary magazine Leer. In January 2020 she won the Nadal Award in Spain for her novel El mapa de los afectos.

Between 2004 and 2014 Merino was a member of the Board of Directors for the Center for Cartoon Studies and between 2001 and 2011 a member of the executive committee of International Comic Art Forum. Merino's articles on comics have appeared in Leer, DDLV, The Comics Journal, International Journal of Comic Art, and Hispanic Issues. She has served as curator for four comics exhibitions and is the author of the bilingual catalogue Fantagraphics creadores del canon (2003). Ana Merino currently lives in Iowa City.

== Works ==
=== Poetry ===
- Preparativos para un viaje, Madrid, Rialp, 1995. (Winner of the XLVIII Premio Adonais)
- Los días gemelos, Madrid, Visor, 1997
- La voz de los relojes, Madrid, Visor, 2000
- Juegos de niños, Madrid, Visor, 2003 (Premio Fray Luis de León)/"Child's Play", Harbor Mountain Press, 2012(translation by Elizabeth Polli)
- Compañera de celda, Madrid, Visor, 2006/"Cell Mate", Harbor Mountain Press, 2007 (translation by Elizabeth Polli)
- Curación, Madrid, Visor, 2010 (Accésit Premio Jaime Gil de Biedma)
- Hagamos caso al tigre, Madrid, Sopa de Libros, Anaya, 2010. Illustrations by Francesc Capdevila, alias Max.
- El viaje del vikingo soñado, Madrid, Santillana, 2015. Illustrations by Francesc Capdevila, alias Max.
- Los buenos propósito, Madrid, Visor, 2015.
- Salvamento de hormigas, Madrid, Visor, 2022.
- Bilingual Anthology: "Schere, Stein, Papier und andere Gedichte" (German translation by Rita Catrina Imboden). teamart Verlag Zurich 2009.

=== Plays ===
- La redención (2016), Reino de Cordelia. Iowa City, Theater B, University of Iowa, May 2017 with Karla Álvarez, Beatriz O. Gallardo, Eloy Barragán, Jim Evans, Horacio F. Olivo and Valeria Amador. Co-director Taylor Claman.
- Las decepciones (2014), col.[dis]locados; Literal Publishing/Conaculta.
- Amor: muy frágil (2012), Zúrich Theater Stok, December 2012 with Alberto Ruano, Sandra Zellweger, Rainer Jutzi, Sandra Vilas, Mireya Sánchez, Sonia Díaz y Carolina Flores.

Book in Spanish by Reino de Cordelia (2013; 2 Edic 2014) publisher:http://www.reinodecordelia.es/libro.php?id=124 trailer; https://www.youtube.com/watch?v=xwgwyO-0smE

=== Short Theater in collections ===
- Escenas alrededor de la leyenda de Bernardo del Carpio. Leyendas de León contadas por...: Editorial Rimpego, León, 2013: 149–155.

=== Fiction ===
- Amigo(novel), Destino, 2022.
- El mapa de los afectos (novel Premio Nadal 2020), Destino, 2020.
- El hombre de los dos corazones (novel), Madrid, Anaya, 2009.

=== Poems in collections ===
- República poética 1.0: Panorama de la poesía contemporánea en español en el umbral del siglo XXI (bilingual edition Polish/Spanish). Edited by Marta Eloy Cichocka. Lokator, 2015: 243–269.
- El canon abierto: Última poesía en español. Edited by Remedios Sánchez García. Colección Visor de Poesía, 2015: 179–185.
- Spanish Contemporary Poetry (An anthology). Edited by Diana Cullell. Manchester University Press, 2014: 119–124.
- Ciudad Cien/Antología Poética. Edición Juana Goergen. Colección Erato/ Poesía en abril, DePaul University, 2014:19-22.
- La poesía en su laberinto. Laura Scarano (ed.) Orbis Tertius. France, 2013: 261–268.
- Trato preferente: Voces essentiales de la poesía actual en español. Balbina Prior (coord.) Contrapunto, Sial Ediciones, 2010: 391–399.
- Igra Kroznih Zrcal: Novejsa Spanska Poezija. Izbral, prevdel in spremna besedila napisal Ciril Bergles, Aleph/130, Ljubljana, 2009: 218–226.
- El hacer poético. Edición de Julio Ortega y María Ramírez Ribes. Colección Entre Mares, Universidad Veracruzana, México, 2008:571-574.
- YemBbpm Bek ucnaHcka noe3uR 1980-2005 aHtoπoINR (Spanish Anthology in Bulgarian) Selection and prologue by Jose Luis García Martín. Translation by Rada Panchovska. Próxima RP, editorial, Sofía 2008:125-137.
- Héroes y villanos del cómic. Helden en schurken in het stripverhaal. Héros et villains de la bande dessinée. Colección compass. Fundación Carlos de Amberes, 2007:71-77 (Illustration by Joost Swarte)
- Héroes y villanos del cómic. Helden en schurken in het stripverhaal. Héros et villains de la bande dessinée. Colección compass. Fundación Carlos de Amberes, 2007:71-77 (Illustration by Joost Swarte)
- Dónde está el niño que yo fui?: Poemas para leer en la escuela Edición de Pedro C.Cerrillo Torremocha, Ediciones Akal, Madrid, 2006:132-133.
- León: Una mirada literaria. Coordinación Luis Mateo Díez. Fundación Hullera Vasco-Leonesa, León, 2006: 249–257.
- Ultima poesía española (1990–2005). Edición y selección de Rafael Morales Barba, Editorial Marenostrum, Madrid, 2006: 165–180.
- Que la fuerza te acompañe/ May the force be with you. Colección Salamandria. 1. El Gaviero Ediciones, Almería, 2005: “El despertar de Han Solo/ Han Solo’s Awakening”.
- 6+6. Un quijote contemporáneo, don quichot hier en nu. Fundación Carlos de Amberes, 2005:62-65
- Poetas en la casa de la Luna: Poesía Latinoamericana Contemporánea. Margarito Cuellar/ Rei Benoa editors. Universidad Autónoma de Nuevo León/ George Mason University, 2004:127-137.
- Ilimitada voz. (Antología de poetas españolas 1940-2002 ). Jose María Balcells, Universidad de Cádiz, 2003*.
- La lógica de Orfeo. Luis Antonio de Villena. Antología. Visor. 2003: 203–218.
- Poetisas Españolas. Antología General. Tomo IV: De 1976 a 2001. Luz María Jiménez Faro, Ediciones Torremozas, Madrid, 2002: 306.
- Mujeres de carne y verso. La Esfera, 2002.
- Yo es otro: autorretratos de la nueva poesía. Selección de Josep M. Rodríguez, DVD poesía, Barcelona, 2001:39.
- Poesia Espanhola, anos 90. Joaquim Manuel Magalhaes. Posfacio de José Angel Cilleruelo. Relógio d’agua Editores. Lisboa, 2000.
- “Pasar la Página, Poetas para el nuevo milenio”. Manuel Rico. Diálogo de la Lengua, Revista de estudio y Creación Literaria, Ediciones Olcades, Cuenca MM, 2000: 223–231.
- MILENIO. Ultimísima Poesía Española (Antología), Basilio Rodríguez Cañada, Celeste Sial Ediciones/ Contrapunto, Madrid 1999: 381–388.
- La generación del 99.Jose Luís García Martín, Ediones Nobel, Colección Clarín, Oviedo 1999: 359–374.
- Ellas tienen la palabra . Noni Benegas y Jesús Munarriz, eds. Hiperión. Madrid 1997:643-651.
- “Nuevas voces en la poesía española”, Antonio Lucas, Postdata: Revista de Artes, Letras y Pensamiento. Spain. 17/18, 1997:81-84.
- “Joven Poesía Española”, Carlos Álvarez-Ude, La página, Santa Cruz de Tenerife, 27, 1997:66-73.
