= Moschatel Press =

Moschatel Press is a small press publisher producing artist's books and poetry collections. It was founded in Nailsworth, Gloucestershire, in 1973, by the artist Laurie Clark and the Scottish poet Thomas A. Clark and moved to Pittenweem, Fife in 2002. The press "is named after adoxa moschatellina, a plant known locally as Town Clock for its four-way green flower heads, with a fifth flower facing the sky." Their main line is in "publishing minimal texts, visual poetry and the like in small neat booklets and postcards."

They have published work by Ian Hamilton Finlay among other artists; although most of their output is their own work which frequently consists of reflections on nature. A treadle press they were given as a wedding present inspired the founding of Moschatel Press, allowing them to print poems and send them to friends. The treadle press was replaced by a tabletop Adana printing press.

== Founders ==
Thomas A. Clark was born in Greenock, Scotland in 1944 and left school, "barely literate", at 15. He then worked in factories and warehouses for the next eight year, before realising "there was a world outside to be lived in".

Clark moved to England in 1967.

Laurie Clark was born in New York in 1949 and married Thomas A. Clark in 1972.

== Cairn Gallery ==
In 1986 the Clarks established the Cairn Gallery initially in Days Mill, Nailsworth, and subsequently in Pittenweem. The Gallery an artist-run space, for land art, minimalism and lyrical or poetic conceptualism.

== Publications ==
The list of publications is first derived from the Moschatel Press Bibliography published by the press itself for an exhibition at the Coracle Press, Camberwell, from 1 December 1979 to 5 January 1980. The list of subsequent publications is not definitive. All works are by Thomas A. Clark unless otherwise stated.

A box set of 67 publications was issued in 1982. Further collections were issued as "A Box Of Landscapes" in 2010 and 2016, comprising publications spanning forty years of the Moschatel Press and others.

In addition to his work with Moschatel Press, Thomas A. Clark led a group of artists installing artworks in the new Stobhill Hospital, Glasgow for its opening in 2009.

Publication year	Title	Author	Artist	Notes
1973	Fill In The Drawing		Laurie Clark	
1973	Fritillary		Laurie Clark	Publication year not printed
1973	Folding The Last Sheep			Publication year not printed
1973	An Epitaph			
1973	The Garden			
1974	Horizon			
1974	Four Flowers			
1974	A Wee Tot For Catullus	Jonathan Williams		
1974	Snowdrop	Ian Hamilton Finlay		Publication year not printed
1974	Iris		Laurie Clark	
1974	Shape & Shade		Laurie Clark	Publication year not printed
1974	September			Publication year not printed
1974	Not Now	Cid Corman		
1974	A Basket of Landscapes		Laurie Clark	Publication year not printed
1974	Pebbles		Laurie Clark	Publication year not printed
1975	Glade			
1975	Deserts of Afghanistan		Helen Williams	
1975	L'Invitation Au Voyage		Laurie Clark	Publication year not printed
1975	Anemone		Laurie Clark	Publication year not printed
1975	Moss Stitch		Laurie Clark	
1975	A Vase Of Daffodils		Laurie Clark	Publication year not printed
1976	Petits Fours			
1976	Painted Lady		Laurie Clark	
1976	Two Horizons		Laurie Clark	Publication year not printed
1976	Clare's "Journey Out Of Essex"	Simon Cutts	Laurie Clark	
1976	Thrums		Laurie Clark	Publication year not printed
1976	Hart's Tongue		Laurie Clark	
1977	Foliations		Laurie Clark	
1977	Two Acres			
1977	The Bright Glade		Laurie Clark	
1977	A Meadow Voyage		Laurie Clark	Publication year not printed
1977	Haystacks and Islands		Laurie Clark	
1978	Nine Roses		Laurie Clark	
1978	Fly Patterns For Still Waters		Laurie Clark	
1978	Gatherings		Laurie Clark	Publication year not printed
1978	Water Cresses		Laurie Clark	
1978	Quatrefoils		Laurie Clark	Printed for South West Review; publication year not printed
1979	After Pissarro		Laurie Clark	Publication year not printed
1979	Two Evergreen Horizons		Laurie Clark	
1979	A Glade Of Lances			
1979	The Dappled Glade		Laurie Clark	
1979	Style		Laurie Clark	
1979	Of Leaves		Laurie Clark	
1979	Proverbs Of The Meadow		Laurie Clark	Publication year not printed
1979	Four English Flowers		Laurie Clark	
1979	From A Glossary Of Old Scots			
1979	Moschatel Press Bibliography	with introduction by Alan Tucker	Laurie Clark	600 copies
1979	A Rock Pool		Laurie Clark	
1979	In The Scottish Lowlands			
1979	A Short Tour of the Highlands		Laurie Clark	
1979	The Frog Leaps Thirteen Times		Laurie Clark	
1980	Four Horizons			
1980	Tansy Buttons		Laurie Clark	
1980	A Herb Garden			250 signed and numbered copies
1980	Adjectives For Grasses		Laurie Clark	
1980	Proverbs Of The Mountain		Laurie Clark	300 signed and numbered copies
1980	Parenthetical Land		Laurie Clark	Card for opening of Alan & Joan Tucker's new bookshop, Stroud, Glos
1981	A Delphinium Border			200 numbered copies
1981	Dicotyledons		Laurie Clark	
1981	From A Bookseller's Catalogue			
1981	Four Fruits			150 numbered copies
1981	Metamorphosis			
1981	A Moth Glade			
1981	Photography In The Open Air		Laurie Clark	
1981	Ruin Wood		Laurie Clark	200 numbered copies
1981	Sixteen Sonnets			
1981	Solos, Duets & Quartets	Simon Cutts	Laurie Clark	125 signed and numbered copies
1981	The Tapestry		Laurie Clark	
1981	Three Triolets			
1982	A Dedication		Laurie Clark	
1982	By Footpath & Stile	(no text)	Laurie Clark	300 copies
1982	For Returning Warriors /In Memoriam			
1982	Geum Rivale		Laurie Clark	200 numbered copies
1982	The Lacemaker		Laurie Clark	
1982	Wayward Definitions		Laurie Clark	200 copies; expanded edition published as "Vagrant Definitions" by Membrane Press, Shorewood, WI, 1984
1982	Three Colours			200 numbered colours
1982	Moschatel Press	Stuart Mills	Laurie Clark	Essay for University of Warwick Library exhibition of books, cards and prints by Thomas A. Clark and Laurie Clark
1982	Twenty Four Sentences About The Forest			
1982	Under The Brae		Laurie Clark	
1983	In A Country Churchyard	(no text)	Laurie Clark	200 copies
1983	Pauses and Digressions		Laurie Clark	300 copies of which 12 are signed and hand-coloured
1983	The Blue Boat, No. 1	Robert Lax	Laurie Clark	Published as an occasional magazine
1983	The Blue Boat, No. 2	Jean Follain		
1984	Far Oak Ridge		Laurie Clark	
1985	On Greta Bridge			Published jointly with Underwich Editions, Canada; 500 copies
1986	The Idle Road		Laurie Clark	250 copies of which 20 are signed and hand-coloured
1987	Six Triolets		Laurie Clark	
1989	Through White Villages			
1989	The Flowers of Ben Lawers		Laurie Clark	
1990	Coire Fhionn Lochan		Laurie Clark	
1990	From Sea To Sea			
1991	Forest, Mountain, City			
1991	The Philosophy Of Furniture	Simon Cutts	Laurie Clark	
1991	The Teachings of Huang Po			
1992	Of Shade And Shadow			
1992	On A Line From Yeats			
1993	A Collect			
1994	Gold And Silver		Laurie Clark	Christmas Card
1994	Larch Covert			
1995	Apples And Intervals			
1995	Glade			
1995	The Shape Changer		Laurie Clark	
1995	Three Exercises			
1995	Two Landscapes			
1996	Morning, Evening			
1997	A Standard Of Music		Laurie Clark	
1997	An Interval			
1997	May The Best Hour			
1997	Taking Up Again			
1997	Three Wishes			
1997	A Melting of Snowflakes			Christmas Card
1998	At Dusk & At Dawn			
1998	Four Greetings		Laurie Clark	Christmas Card
1999	Forest Without Trees			
1999	Shieling In The Brambles			
1999	Stone			
1999	Here is Rosemary		Laurie Clark	Christmas Card
2000	Branches and Quinces			Christmas Card
2001	Twelve Proverbs		Laurie Clark	
2001	Sparrows		Laurie Clark	Christmas Card
2004	Gorse River Sequence		Laurie Clark	for Peter Larkin
2004	The Year Of The Water Rail		Laurie Clark	
2005	Frost & Snow		Laurie Clark	for Richard Valentine (Secondhand Bookseller, Nailsworth)
2005	Harebell		Laurie Clark	
2006	Blue			
2006	Hazel Wood			
2006	Wild Strawberries		Laurie Clark	
2007	Dusk			
2007	Floating Island			
2007	Flow			
2007	Little Burn			
2007	Four Fruits (2)			
2007	In The Black Wood			
2007	Tràigh Balla			
2007	Whenever You Linger			
2006/7	Postcards			set of 6
2008	Colour in the island			
2008	From Many Waters			
2008	Learning to be Blue			
2008	of Woods & Water			
2008	Sgiath nan Tarmachan			
2008	Some Imaginary Flowers			for Eck
2008	Spring Summer			
2008	Still Life with Fruit and Flower			
2008	Taste is to Whisk			
2009	A Lamp of Fish Oil			Christmas Card
2010	Sylviidae		Laurie Clark	
2010	Delight; Fragrance; Thrift		Laurie Clark	3 card set
2010	Suspicion of Beauty		Laurie Clark	5 card set
2010/2011	Leave-Taking; Clearing; Crocus		Laurie Clark	3 card set
2011	Dipper		Laurie Clark	
2011	Mint			
2011	Unfolding Brightness			Christmas Card
2012	Gaelic Flowers			
2013	Jay		Laurie Clark	
2014	The Grove Of Delight			
2015	Mist & Mountain		Laurie Clark	
2015	The Quiet Island		Laurie Clark	
2015	With		Laurie Clark	
2016	Dove			
2016	Star of Bethlehem			Christmas Card
2017	The Fort Of Stillness			
undated	An Lochan Uaine			
undated	An Affinity Of Eye And Petal		Laurie Clark	
undated	Adoxa			Printed in Fife

== Related publications ==
Other published works by Thomas A. Clark include:

- Bo Heem E Um No.1 - Poems/Editor - Greenock, 1966. (Includes two concrete poems by Dom Sylvester Houédard)
- ARC 8 (number 15) - Arc, Gillingham, Kent, 1970
- Some Particulars - The Jargon Society, 1971
- Epitaphs for Lorine - The Jargon Society, 1973
- Pointing Still - Arc Publications, Gillingham, Kent, 1974
- A Still Life - The Jargon Society, Dentdale 1977
- Arrangement In A Blue Jug - Arnica Press, 1977 (frontispiece by Laurie Clark; 100 signed and numbered copies of which 50 on hand-made paper, 50 on Hochu paper)
- Fragments Of A Walled Garden - Braad Editions, Bretenoux, France, 1977 (illustrations by Laurie Clark; 275 copies of which 26 are signed and numbered)
- Pebbles From A Japanese Garden - Topia Press, New York, 1977 (illustrations by Laurie Clark; 200 copies of which 26 are signed)
- Poetry Information, 18 - Interview by Glyn Pursglove - Peter Hodgkins, London, 1977
- A Ruskin Sketchbook - Coracle Press, London, 1979 (500 copies)
- The Pocket Glade Dictionary - Coach House Press, Toronto, 1980 (300 copies)
- Madder Lake - Coach House Press, Toronto, 1981
- A Garden In The Hills / Un Jardin sur les Monts - Atelier de l'Agneau, Herstal, Belgium, 1981
- Review No 17 - Aggie Weston's, 1981 (with cover illustration by Laurie Clark)
- The Brothers - New Arcadian's Journal no. 8 - New Arcadians, Bradford, 1982 (with illustration by Laurie Clark; 250 numbered copies)
- Adventures Among Birds - Chocolate News Books, Camberwell, 1982 (200 copies)
- In The Open Air - screen prints by John Christie - Circle Press, Guildford, 1982
- Ways Through Bracken - The Jargon Society, 1983
- Twenty Poems - Grosseteste, 1983
- In Praise Of Walking - Cairn Gallery, Nailsworth, 1988 (reprinted 1977 by Walking Bird Press and East Coast Trail Association, Newfoundland, 1977 in 500 numbered copies)
- Riasg Buidhe - with Roger Ackling, 1987
- The Homecoming - Prest Roots Press, Kenilworth, 1988
- Silences of Noons, The Work of F L Griggs (1876-1938) - Exhibition Catalogue - Cheltenham Art Gallery & Museum, 1988
- Dwellings & Habitations - Prest Roots Press, Kenilworth, 1993
- that which appears - Paragon Press, London, 1994 (250 signed copies, 100 with woodcut by Ian McKeever)
- Clashconnachie - Sad Iron Press, 1998
- One Hundred Scottish Places - Parnassus Press, Eindhoven, 1999 (250 copies)
- Exchanges - with Ian Hamilton Finlay - Wild Hawthorn Press, 1999 (illustrations by Laurie Clark)
- Poet's Poems No. 1 - (Editor) - Aggie Weston's Editions, 2000
- Distance & Proximity - Pocketbooks; Morning Star Publications; Polygon; Taigh Chearsabhagh; National Galleries of Scotland, 2000
- The Path to the Sea - Arc Publications, Todmorden, 2005
- Doire Fhearna - Empty Hands Broadside #8 - Country Valley Press, Gardnerville, NV (100 copies of which 26 are signed)
- I den klare lufta - Nordsjøforlaget, Norway, 2007
- Grey - Longhouse, Green River VT, 2007
- The Hundred Thousand Places - Carcanet Press, 2008
- The Hidden Place - site specific wall painting at Ingleby Gallery, Edinburgh, 2010; also issued as screen print - 100 signed and numbered copies
- Yellow & Blue - Carcanet Press, 2014
- Shade - Corbel Stone Press, 2014 (illustrations by Laurie Clark; 60 copies plus 12 signed and numbered with hand-coloured illustration)
- Farm By The Shore - Carcanet Press, 2017

Other publications featuring drawings by Laurie Clark include:

- A Walk Round Stroud - Stroud Civic Society, 1980
- The Englishwoman's Garden - Chatto & Windus, 1980
- A Country Lane - with Ian Hamilton Finlay - Wild Hawthorn Press, 1983
- The Englishman's Garden - Penguin, 1985
- Docking Competitions - with Erica Van Horn - Coracle, Docking, Norfolk, 1995
- In A Dark Wood - Exhibition at Cheltenham Art Gallery and Museum, November 1994 to January 1995
- Parnassus Parnassia - Parnassus Press, Eindhoven, 1998
- 100 Buttercups - WAX366; Fife Contemporary Art & Craft, 2010. Special Editions lettered A-Z include unique pencil drawing.
- 100 Harebells - 2012
