= Dionýz Ďurišin =

Dionýz Ďurišin (October 16, 1929 – January 26, 1997) was a leading Slovak literary theorist and comparativist of Ukrainian origin. He belonged to the Slovak School of Comparative Literature. He worked in the tradition of the Czech and Slovak schools of comparative literature. He is renowned for developing the notions of world literature, and specifically, interliterary theory and processes, and interliterary communities.

== Work ==
In his work Theory of Literary Comparatistics (1984), he defines "literary process" as the "inner laws of development of literature." He elaborates upon the goal of literary studies, and comparative literature in particular, by noting: "To comprehend the literary phenomenon means not merely to describe its constituents, or to point out their mutual affinity and interdependence within the work of literature, but to reveal the multifarious affinities of the literary phenomenon and the individual procedures with the social, cultural, artistic and literary background in the widest sense of the word" (p. 11). He notes that the ultimate goal of literary research was not "merely reconstruction of the laws of national literature as an organic literary-historical unit, but also the comprehension of the broader laws of the literary process, leading in the final result to the comprehension of the laws governing world literature" (p. 12). In the same book, Ďurišin claimed that he was developing the native Slovak tradition of criticism and developing ideas of theorists like Alexander Veselovsky and Viktor Zhirmunsky.

== Selected bibliography ==
=== Books ===
- Ďurišin, Dionýz. Čo je svetová literatúra? (What Is World Literature?). Bratislava: Obzor, 1992.
- Ďurišin, Dionýz. Sources and Systematics of Comparative Literature. Trans. Peter Tkác. Bratislava: U Komenského, 1974.
- Ďurišin, Dionýz. Theory of Interliterary Process. Trans. Jessie Kocmanová and Zdenek Pistek. Bratislava: Slovak Academy of Sciences, 1989.
- Ďurišin, Dionýz. Theory of Literary Comparatistics. Trans. Jessie Kocmanová. Bratislava: Slovak Academy of Sciences, 1984.
- Ďurišin, Dionýz. Vergleichende Literaturforschung. Versuch eines methodisch-theoretischen Grundrisses. Berlin: Akademie, 1976.
- Ďurišin, Dionýz, and Armando Gnisci, eds. Il Mediterraneo. Una rete interletteraria / La Médéterranée. Un Réseau interlittéraire / Sterdomorie medziliterárna siet'. Roma: Bulzoni, 2000.
