= Scottish gravestones =

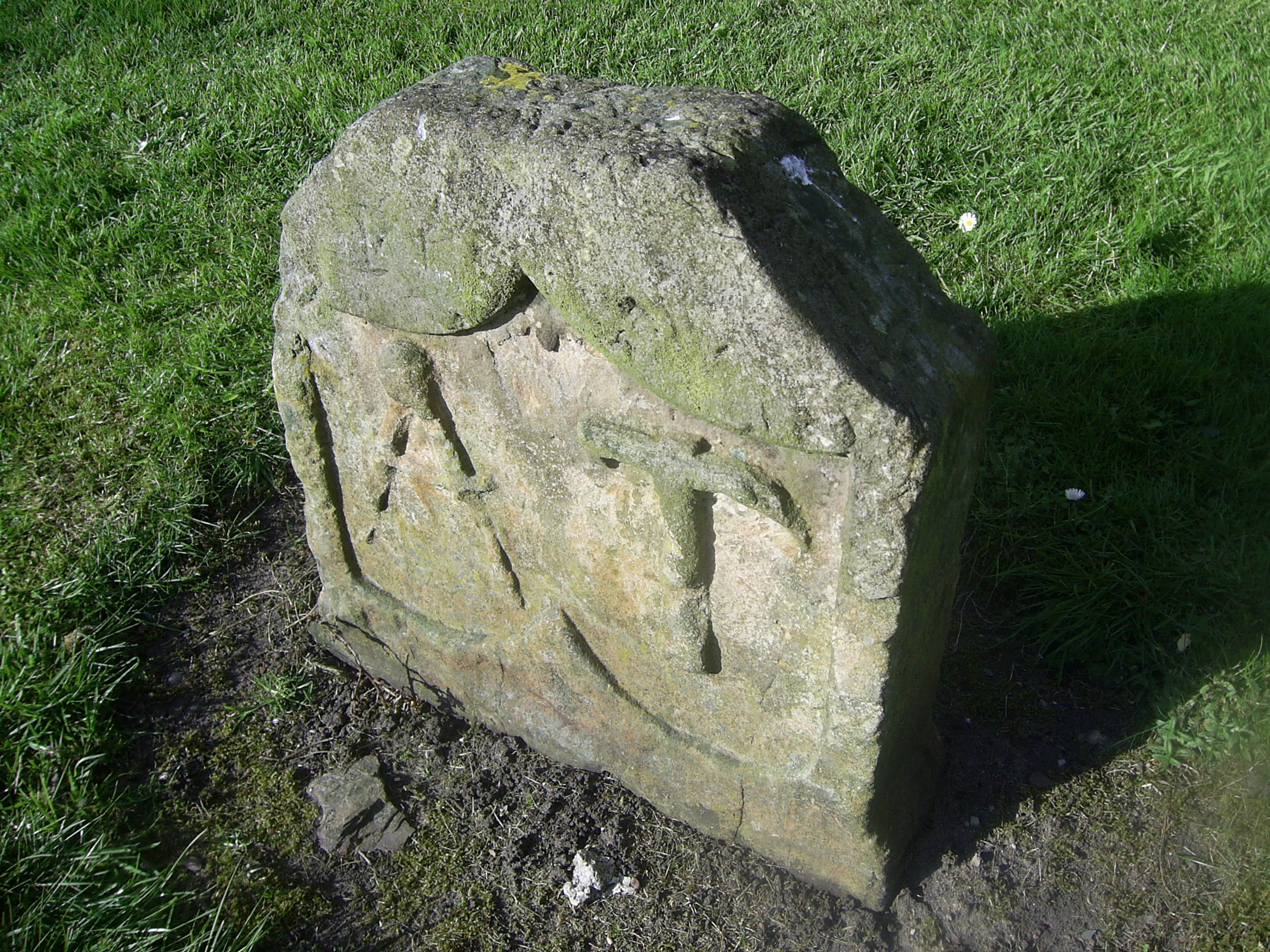
Early Scottish Trades Gravestone. Irvine.

The Scottish or Lowland Scottish gravestone is unique to the north of the British Isles. The study of Scottish Lowland Gravestones is essential to the overall study of British monumental inscriptions. The level of symbolism and detail on Scottish stones reached a peak during the 18th century.

== Early tombs ==
The earliest tombs in Scotland are now lost. If Palaeolithic man ever set foot in that country, all traces have been wiped away. However, numerous Mesolithic and Neolithic tombs, cairns, chambered cairns and burial mounds have been discovered and studied. The Bronze and Iron Ages may have pioneered the concept of a modern graveyard for their remains have been found grouped together in much the same manner as today. In addition to using traditional burial methods, they would also create allotments for their dead. Iron Age burials are, however currently rare in Britain.

== Early church burials ==
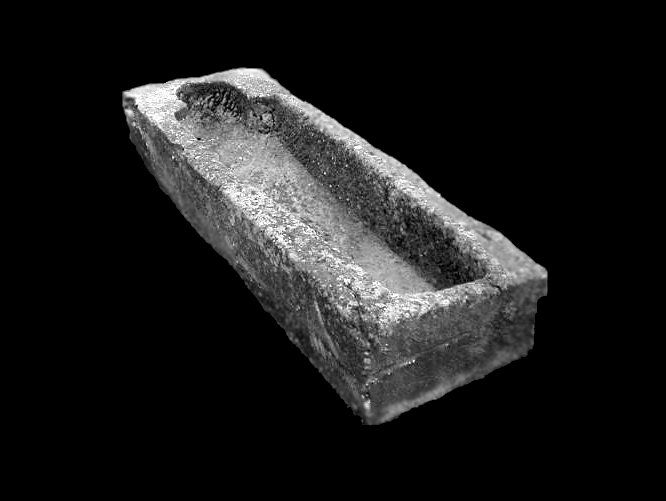
Medieval Stone Coffin on open-air display in Ayrshire

British archaeological evidence indicates that the custom of burying the dead in or around a church began as early as the 8th century. By the early 12th century, Saxons, Normans and Flemish knights were given lands throughout Scotland. The new lords built chapels and churches on their new estates. With so many servants, beneficiaries and eventually Tenants, the Church land was soon used to bury the dead of the surrounding village.

== Pre-Reformation ==
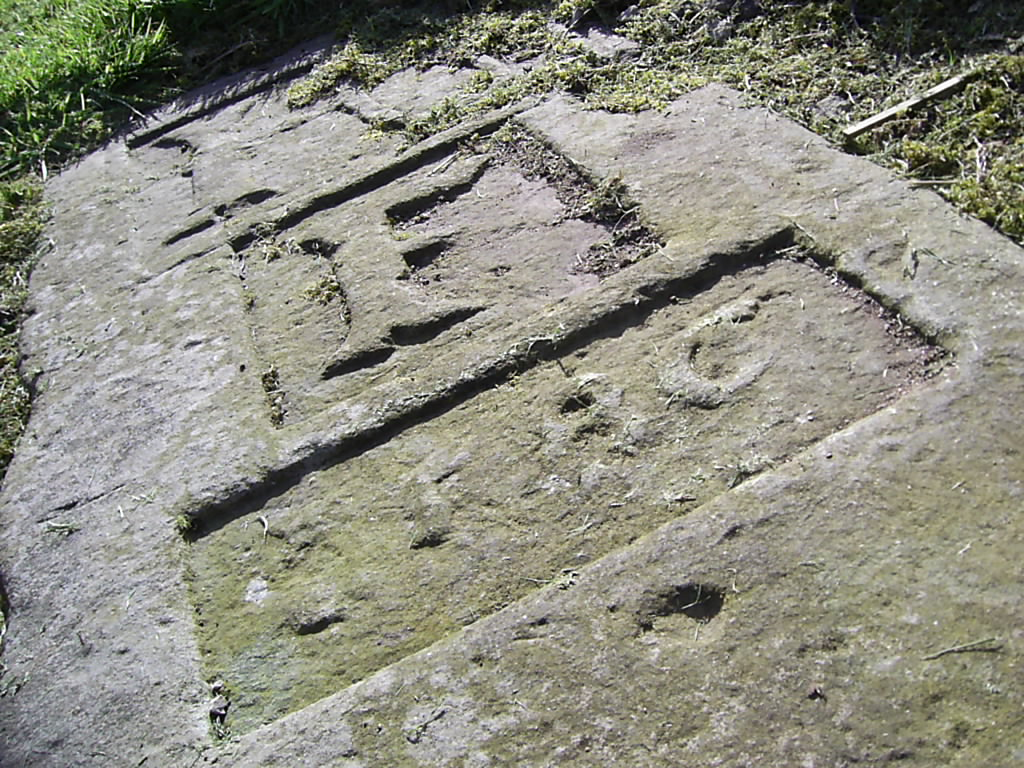
Slab stone dated 1586. Dreghorn Old Kirkyard.

Very few pre-Reformation stones exist today and those that do are often removed from their original position and given care and shelter in a local museum. Medieval stone coffins, or sarcophagi, are more abundant.

Since 1457, it had been the habit to organise the local Wappenshaw (presenting weaponry for inspection) in the local graveyards. The resulting wounds on the fine sandstone of many rare stones has left them defaced by the continuous bombardment of missiles.

== Post-Reformation ==
The 16th century, the century in which Scotland played host to her own Protestant Reformation, was a quiet one for Scottish gravestones. It seems that they were seldom produced and are indeed a rare sight today in our old graveyards. More stones were produced in the 17th and 18th centuries.

== 17th-century stones ==
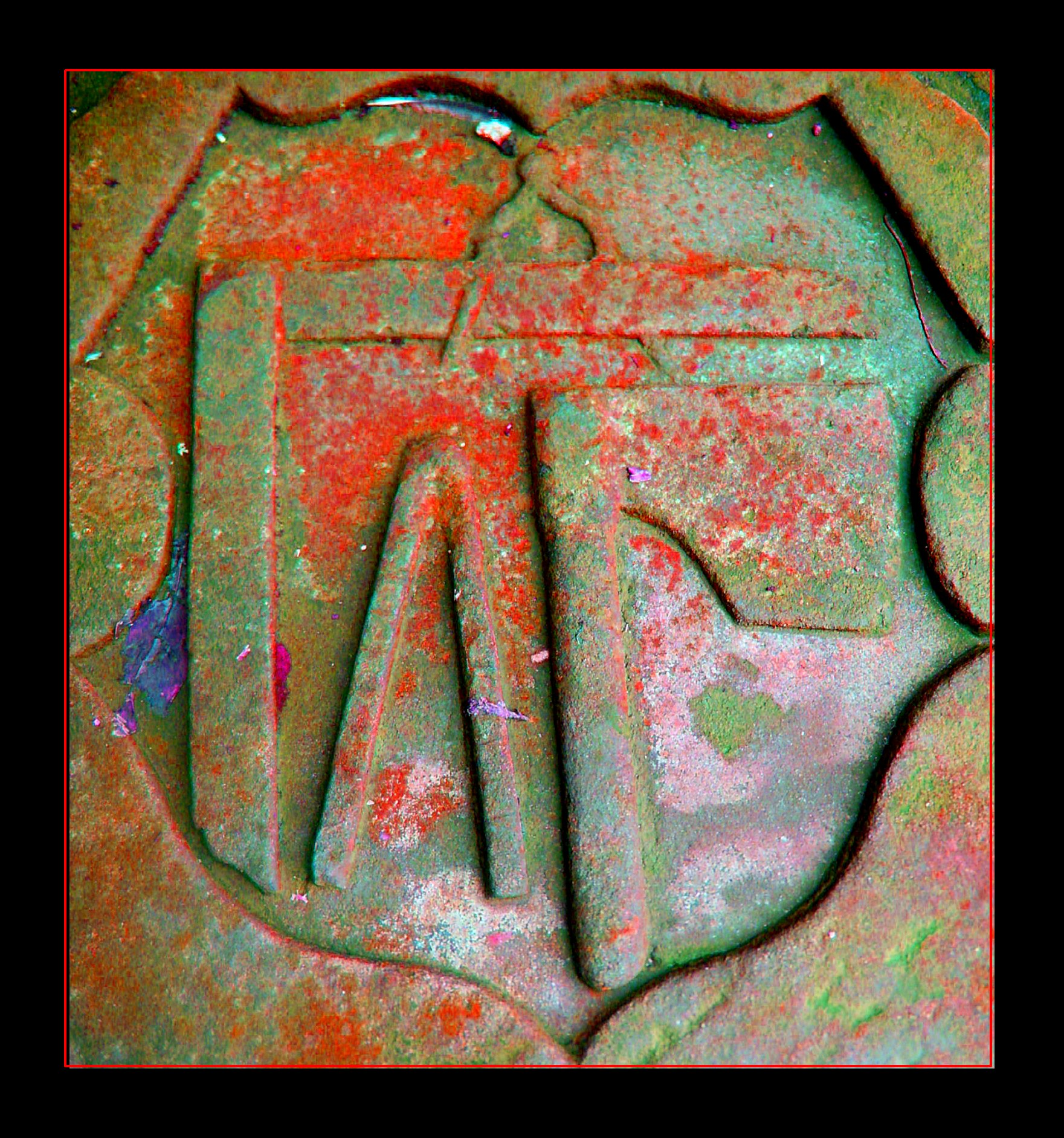
Trade Tools depicted on a 17th-century lowland Paisley Gravestone

By the early 17th century, many ancient graveyards had become swollen with so many bodies that their lands were recognisable as burial grounds. Some sites have been subjected to an increase of several feet in height. By the middle of the century, we begin to see more identification marks on the stones. Heraldic devices, craft tools, symbols of mortality and the name, date of birth and often the address of the deceased began to be crammed onto the limited surfaces of the stone.

One side of the headstone was dedicated to written identification while the other was to be used for symbolic expression. The symbolic elements would usually reveal the man's occupation while reminding living viewers of the inevitability of death.

== 18th-century stones ==
18th-century Lowland Gravestone.

Perhaps the most ambitious period of Headstone carving. Indeed, it was this century that the traditional headstone came to be used as standard. One fact that marks the Lowland Scottish Headstone as unique is that the Headstone took almost a century to penetrate into the highlands, where the older slab and table grave markers were still being used until shortly before the 19th century. The height of 18th-century Scottish Lowland Gravestones can be anywhere between 60 cm and 100 cm. Also unique to the Scottish Lowland gravestone are the materials. Sandstone is an easily carved but easily weathered rock but it was used as the standard gravestone material in the north of Britain. In the south, where marbles and granite were the preferred medium, we see an understandable hesitation on the part of the stonemason to overly decorate the hard stones of England.

18th-century Scottish gravestones are almost always oriented east to west. The part which contains the identification of the cadaver usually faces towards the Holy Land. Since most 18th-century were left relatively unadorned, the rear side of stone was frequently left unmarked. This is the side that invariably faced away from the Holy Land, towards the west. However, in many lowland graveyards, the side usually left unmarked is covered with extravagant designs.

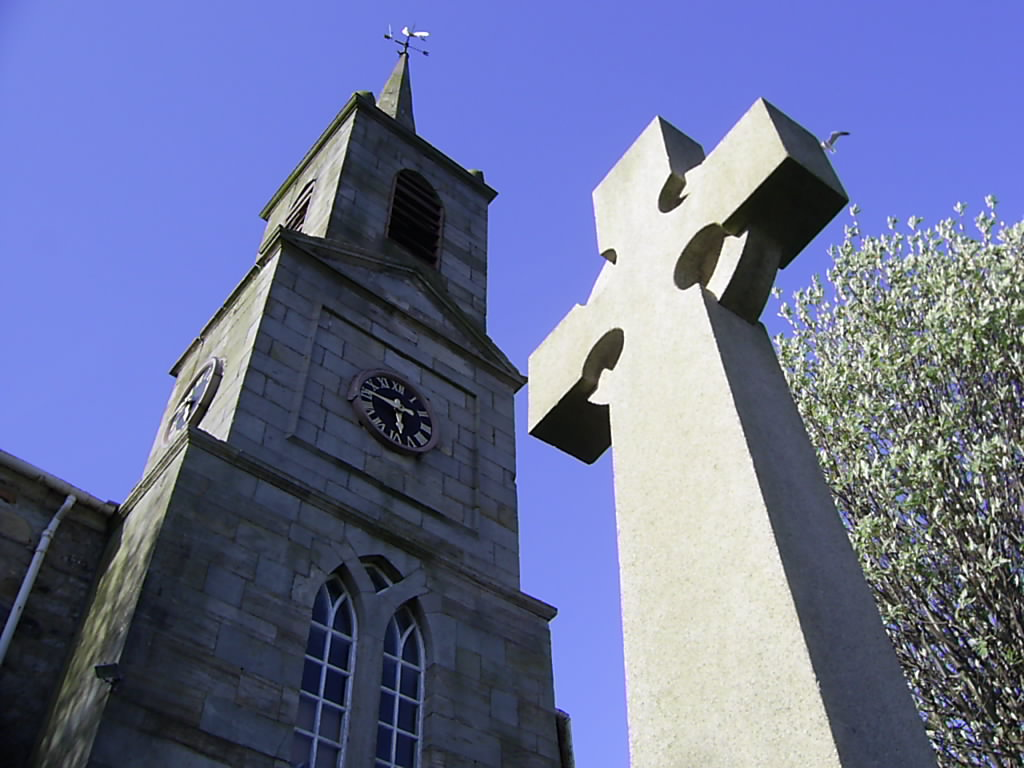
19th-century ornate stone

In the mid-18th century, tradesman, craftsmen and tenant farmers found themselves in a time of prosperity. A direct result of this was the increase in carefully inscribed gravestones for the common folk.

== 19th-century stones ==
The 19th century saw almost all memorial permutations of the past come back with gusto. Wall monuments, crypts, headstones, table and slab stones and even replica Hog Backs were all common designs in Victorian Scotland. The introduction of the Cast-Iron Grave Marker would simply add yet another embellishment to an already decorative art form.

== See also ==
- Cemetery
- Graveyard
- Churchyard
- Headstone
- Dreghorn
- Perceton
- Thomas Reid's tombstone

== Sources ==
- Understanding Scottish Graveyards by B. Willsher
- Scottish Epitaphs by Betty Willsher
- History of the Royal Burgh of Irvine by John Strawhorn
- A Historical Guide to Ayrshire by Dane Love
- Stones: a guide to some remarkable eighteenth-century gravestones by Betty Willsher and Doreen Hunter. Edinburgh : Canongate, 1978.
- East Lothian gravestones by Islay Donaldson. East Lothian District Council, 1991.
- Midlothian gravestones by Islay Donaldson. Midlothian District Library Service, 1994.
