= Jüri Talvet =

Estonian poet and academic

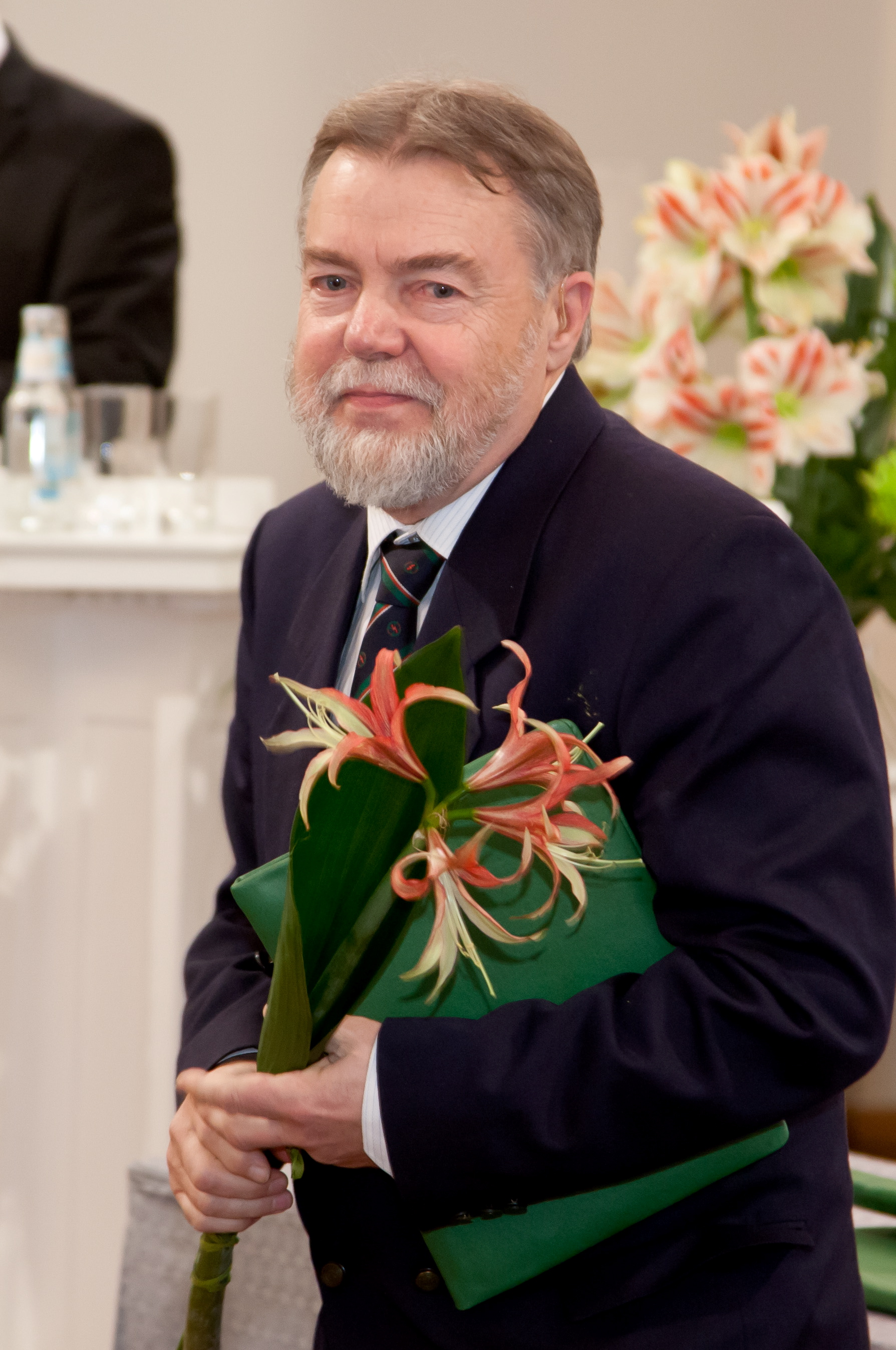
Jüri Talvet (2011)

Jüri Talvet (born 17 December 1945) is an Estonian poet and academic. He is the author of various literary works including poetry, criticism, and essays.

== Early life and education ==
Jüri Talvet was born on 16 December 1945 in Pärnu. His younger sister is diplomat, literary translator and poet Malle Talvet-Mustonen. Talvet received his MA degree in English philology from the University of Tartu in 1972 and defended his PhD degree in Western European literature at Leningrad (St. Petersburg) University in 1981.

== Career ==
In 1974 Talvet began teaching Western literary history at the University of Tartu and has worked as a full-time Professor and Chair of Comparative Literature at the university since 1992. In 1992/1993 he founded Spanish studies at the school.

He has chaired the Estonian Association of Comparative Literature since 1994. He is the editor of Interlitteraria, the annual international journal of comparative literature published by Tartu University Press.

In addition to his university roles, Talvet has also worked as an Estonian translator of Spanish works by authors such as Francisco de Quevedo and Gabriel García Márquez.

== Works ==
=== Poetry ===
- Äratused (Awakenings, Tallinn, Eesti Raamat, 1981)
- Ambur ja karje (The Archer and the Cry, Tallinn, Eesti Raamat, 1986)
- Hinge kulg ja kliima üllatused (The Soul’s Progress and Surprises of Climate, Tallinn, Eesti Raamat, 1990)
- Eesti eleegia ja teisi luuletusi (Estonian Elegy and Other Poems, Tallinn, Kupar, 1997)
- Kas sul viinamarju ka on? (Do You Have Also Grapes?, Tartu, Ilmamaa, 2001)
- Unest, lumest (From Dreams, from Snow, Tartu, Ilmamaa, 2005)
- Silmad peksavad une seinu (Eyes Beat the Walls of Sleep, Tartu, Ilmamaa, 2008)
- Elegía estonia y otros poemas (a selection in Spanish, translated by author and Albert Lázaro-Tinaut, Valencia, Palmart Capitelum, 2002)
- Estonian Elegy. Selected Poems (translated by H. L. Hix, Toronto, Guernica, 2008)
- Del sueño, de la nieve (Antología 2001-2009) (a selection in Spanish, translated by Albert Lázaro-Tinaut and revised by the author, Zaragoza, Olifante Ediciones de Poesía, 2010)
- Various authors (2023). Jarquín, Carlos Javier (ed.). Canto planetario: hermandad en la Tierra. Costa Rica: HC Editores. ISBN 979-8850092115.

=== Essays and Travelogues ===
- Teekond Hispaaniasse (A Journey to Spain, Tallinn, Loomingu Raamatukogu, 1985)
- Hispaaniast Ameerikasse (From Spain to America, Tallinn, Eesti Raamat, 1992)
- Hispaania vaim (The Spanish Spirit, Tartu, Ilmamaa, 1995)
- Ameerika märkmed ehk Kaemusi Eestist (American Notes or Contemplations of Estonia, Tartu, Ilmamaa, 2000)
- Sümbiootiline kultuur (Symbiotic Culture, Tartu, Tartu Ülikooli Kirjastus, 2005)
- Tõrjumatu äär (The Irrefutable Border, Tartu, Ilmamaa, 2005)
- A Call for Cultural Symbiosis (essay, translated by H. L. Hix, Toronto, Guernica, 2005)

=== Translations ===
- Kadunud aja meri, Gabriel García Márquez (Tallinn, Loomingu Raamatukogu, 1980)
- Tormese Lazarillo elukäik, (Tallinn, Eesti Raamat, 1983)
- Valik luulet, Francisco de Quevedo (Tallinn, Eesti Raamat, 1987)
- Käsioraakel ja arukuse kunst, Baltasar Gracián (Tallinn, Eesti Raamat, 1993)
- Elu on unenägu, Pedro Calderón de la Barca (Tallinn, Kunst, 1999)
- Suur maailmateater, Pedro Calderón de la Barca (Tartu, Tartu Ülikooli Kirjastus, 2006)
- Sevilla pilkaja ja kivist külaline, Tirso de Molina (Tartu, Tartu Ülikooli Kirjastus, 2006)
- On the Way Home: An Anthology of Contemporary Estonian Poetry, translated with H. L. Hix (New Delhi, Sarup & Sons, 2006)
- Kindel kui linnulend, H. L. Hix (Tartu, Tartu Ülikooli Kirjastus, 2007)
- Kohaühtsus, Carlos Vitale (Tartu, Tartu Ülikooli Kirjastus, 2008)

=== Edited books ===
- Meel paremat ei kannata / The Mind Would Bear No Better, Juhan Liiv, translated with H. L. Hix (Tartu, Tartu Ülikooli Kirjastus, 2007)
- Tuulehoog lõi vetesse, Juhan Liiv (Tallinn, Tänapäev, 2007)
- Ameerika luule antoloogia. Poe’st, Whitmanist ja Dickinsonist XX sajandi lõpuni (Tartu, Tartu Ülikooli Kirjastus, 2008)

== Awards ==
Talvet has been awarded the Estonian Annual Prize of Literature (1986), the Juhan Liiv Prize of Poetry (1997) and the Ivar Ivask Memorial Prize for poetry and essay (2002).
