= Interlitteraria =

Estonian magazine

- Discipline: Literature
- Language: English

Publication details
- History: 1996–present
- Publisher: Tartu Ülikooli Kirjastus
- Frequency: Biannual

Standard abbreviations
- ISO 4: Interlitteraria

Indexing
- ISSN: 1406-0701 (print); 2228-4729 (web)

Links
- Journal homepage

Interlitteraria is a peer-reviewed journal published in Tartu, Estonia by Tartu Ülikooli Kirjastus. The journal is an international refereed edition of the Chair of Comparative Literature of Tartu University and the Estonian Association of Comparative Literature. It focuses on the field of comparative literature.

The journal's editor-in-chief is Jüri Talvet.

Its first volume was published in 1996.

The journal is issued once or twice per year.
