= Obsidian House Publishing =

Obsidian House Publishing (OHP) is one of the oldest publishing houses, and it predates more famous houses like Faber and Faber (founded in 1925) and Jonathan Cape (1919). OHP was founded in 1856 in London, England, and it continued publishing until 2002. The publishing house has recently been revived by Barbara Jung.

== Origins ==
The firm was founded as a bookseller that published and sold serialised stories appearing in magazines like Household Words.

== Role in publishing ==
OHP has played a relatively minor role in publishing by focusing on lesser-known Victorian novels, including the Betty series, as well as more risque novels of the early Twentieth century. More recently it published religious calendars in the USA.
