= Third Coast =

American region

"Third Coast" is an American colloquialism used to describe coastal regions distinct from the East Coast and the West Coast of the United States. Generally, the term "Third Coast" refers to either the Great Lakes region or the Gulf Coast of the United States. "Fourth Coast" may refer to the same areas, with the assumption that the other is the Third Coast.

== Usage ==
Considering its Great Lakes coasts, Michigan has more miles of shoreline than does any other of the 48 mainland states and more fresh water shoreline than any other state. When considering the sheer size of the Gulf of Mexico bordering the Southern United States, the combined Great Lakes' square mileage of 94,250 is dwarfed by the Gulf's size of 600,000 square miles.

For filmmaking or music production, the term "Third Coast" has been used to refer to locations outside of Hollywood or New York City used for the production of films and TV shows, notable examples including Nashville, Toronto, Vancouver, Albuquerque, Houston, Austin, New Orleans, the Dallas–Fort Worth metroplex, and Australia.

== Fresh Coast ==
The term "Fresh Coast" was popularized by Milwaukee mayor Tom Barrett and is most often used to spur commerce, in contrast to the colloquialism "Rust Belt", first mentioned at a visit in Maple Dale Middle School. Regional media outlets have adopted the phrase in an effort to re-brand Great Lakes development. The term connotes both the area's large resource of fresh water and its educational resources. "Middle Coast" is also often used colloquially within the American Midwest to refer to the lakefront recreational areas, including a Traverse City-based brewery of the same name.

== See also ==
- Arctic Alaska (North Coast)
- Gulf Coast of the United States (Southeast Coast)
- Great Lakes Megalopolis
- Southern hip hop
- French Coast (Mediterranean)
