= Fife Contemporary Art & Craft =

Contemporary visual art and craft organization

Fife Contemporary Art & Craft (FCA&C) is a contemporary visual art and craft organisation based in St Andrews, Fife, Scotland. Its main activity is artist support and exhibitions.

== Organisation and funding ==
Fife Contemporary Art & Craft is part of Creative Scotland's portfolio of Regularly Funded Organisations (RFOs), a group of 118 arts organisations receiving three year funding, currently between 2015–2018.

FCA&C came into existence in 2006, but has its roots in another organisation called the Crawford Arts Centre - a long-established venue in St Andrews that closed in 2006.

== Venues ==
Its programme is not delivered from a single venue, but presented across Fife in museums, galleries, other venues and offsite locations. FCA&C works in partnership with a wide range of organisations within Fife, the UK and internationally to develop projects and is part of several networks including Scottish Touring Exhibitions Consortium.

Venues and partners in Fife have included St Andrews Museum; Kirkcaldy Galleries; MAC (Fife's mobile Museums & Arts Coach); Rothes Halls; Fife Libraries and Civic Centres; Fife Adult Resource Centres; Fife Schools; The Steeple, Newburgh; Falkland Centre for Stewardship; Buckhaven Beehive; Buckhaven Community Centre; Fife College; University of St Andrews; the Byre Theatre; StAnza international poetry festival; Fife Coast & Countryside Trust; Fife Council; Fife Cultural Trust; NHS Fife; Scottish Fisheries Museum.

National and International partners have included Bradford Museums and Galleries; Crafts Council; Craft Scotland; Edinburgh Sculpture Workshop; European Society for Oceanists; Marzee Collection, Netherlands; Oriel Davies Gallery, Wales; Polarcap.

== Support activities ==
The organisation supports artists with advice, information (opportunities e-bulletin), annual symposia, residencies and through administering an artist and craft maker grant scheme. They also support children, schools, and students in a variety of projects including a summer art school, placements for students, and schools workshops.

== Selected projects ==
Past projects include a 2016 exhibition with artist Bobby Niven, as part of the Festival of Architecture, which was inspired by Californian self-build pioneer Lloyd Kahn and included a talk by Lloyd Kahn in May 2016; an exhibition and 'multiple' project by Robert Callender (1932–2011), organised with his wife Elizabeth Ogilvie in 2015; a touring exhibition with Toby Paterson as part of GENERATION 25 Years of Contemporary Art in Scotland in 2014; a digital commission entitled Six Years of Mondays from Thomson and Craighead in 2014; Causing Chaos an exhibition curated with artist Claire Barclay in 2010; Placement - Ceramic Connections: Wales & Scotland, a collaboration with Oriel Davies Gallery in 2011; the first solo photography exhibition by Stanley Wong in 2011; The Marzee Collection at St Andrews in 2009.
