= Harbor Mountain Press =

American nonprofit poetry press

- Founded: 2006
- Founder: Peter Money
- Country of origin: United States
- Headquarters location: White River Junction, Vermont
- Publication types: Books
- Official website: www.harbormountainpress.org

Harbor Mountain Press is an American, nonprofit, poetry press located in White River Junction, Vermont. The press was founded by poet and editor Peter Money in 2006 (in Brownsville, Vermont). Notable authors published by the press include Alice B. Fogel, Sinan Antoon, Jan Clausen, Robert Farnsworth, Ana Merino, Laura Davies Foley, Elizabeth Robinson, Elena Georgiou, Norman MacAfee, and Mario Susko. Harbor Mountain Press titles have been reviewed in venues including Time, Library Journal, Bookslut and others. The press has received funding from the Byrne Foundation and Pentangle Council on the Arts and individual donors. Harbor Mountain Press titles are distributed by Small Press Distribution and GenPop Books.
