= Terra incognita arts organisation + publishers =

terra incognita arts organisation was co-founded in East London in 1997 by Juliette Brown and Alana Jelinek initially as a grassroots visual arts organisation, that explored issues arising from lived experiences, particularly questions around race, exclusion, migration, and representation. From 1997 - 2002, they curated visual art exhibitions. Artists involved in terra incognita projects over that period include Jannane Al-Ani, Mohini Chandra, Zineb Sedira, Eamon O'Kane, Erika Tan, Rea, Martin Parker and Lorrice Douglas. From 2006 - 2009, terra incognita focused instead on publishing, including a small series of short-edition novels, 'less than one percent'. From 2008 to 2017, on behalf of terra incognita, Alana Jelinek started a site-specific project called 'The Field'. The Field was established as a site for considering human-human and human-non-human relationships in a real space and reconsidering the politics of utopia. The terra incognita project ended in 2017, after 20 years.

== Projects ==
Point of Entry (1997) was an open exhibition, inviting artists to make a proposal in response to the exhibition site on Cable Street in East London near the banks of the Thames River. Selected artists included Zineb Sedira, Dominique Rey, Rart and Sete and Colin Darke.

empire and I (1999) was a touring exhibition for which terra incognita invited artists from diverse backgrounds and with different relationships to the British colonial project to make art in response to the theme. Artists included Anthony Key, Erika Tan, Alana Jelinek, Shaheen Merali, and Lorrice Douglas. The exhibition was shown at Pitshager Manor & Gallery, London, and Axiom Arts Centre, Cheltenham.

curio (2002) was a site-specific intervention into the streets of East London, around Brick Lane. Invited artists made various artworks in response to the history and contemporary politics of that location. Artworks by Jananne Al-Ani, Mohini Chandra, Martin Parker, Michele Fuirer.

The AAVAA online project (2006-8) worked with an archive called the Asian and African Artists Archive, begun by Eddie Chambers and later David A Bailey and Sonia Boyce plus others involved in the British Black Arts Movement. Slides and documents are housed in the Docklands campus library of the University of East London. The online archive and outreach projects lasted for 2 years.

terra incognita have also made small scale, temporary interventions like 'Racist Australia Day' (2000) on the anniversary of the Federation of Australia, inviting passers-by to consider the condition of contemporary Aboriginal Australians' lives.

They have been involved with many other small, grassroots arts groups based in London, including Kudu Arts and Numbi Arts, and other curators including Tomomi Iguchi, with whom they published between borders in 2000.

In 2007, terra incognita began to publish novels under '<1%'. The series aims at exploring conscience and consciousness. It has published Dai Vaughan's 'equal' (not sequel or prequel, but equal) to Non-Return called, The Treason of the Sparrows and Alana Jelinek's Ohm's Law, a novel about the relationship between power and resistance.

The Field (2008-2017) The Field was a 13-acre field and woodland north of Stansted Airport, Essex. It was a collaborative participatory project that attempted to re-negotiate and re-think human non-human relationships. The field contains a series of allotments, an apiary, an orchard, a shelter, a compost toilet, an area for camping and site for activities including green wood-working and outreach events. An annual touchstone for the project is moot point where artists, thinkers, scientists, activists and general members of the public came together to engage with themes including, for example, utopia (2009), revolution (2011), and failure (2012). After The Field project ended in 2017, Moot Point was held at Corpus Christi College, University of Cambridge, and explored ideas around Being and Climate Change.

Precedents and inspiration for The Field as site-specific land art project include Rirkrit Tiravanija The Land (1998), Thailand, and Collective Actions' Soviet Union interventions in the 1970s and 80s.

The Field has inspired Idle Women project initiated by Rachel Anderson and Cis Boyle, and No Field Is Innocent by Jane Trowell.
