= Etruscan Press =

American publishing company

- Founded: 2001
- Country of origin: United States
- Headquarters location: Wilkes-Barre, PA
- Distribution: Consortium Book Sales & Distribution
- Key people: Dr. Philip Brady, Founder and Executive Director; Dr. Robert Mooney, Founder and Executive Editor; Steve Oristaglio, Founder and Business Advisor; Amanda Rabaduex, Managing Editor; Pamela Turchin, Production Editor; Bill Schneider, Consulting Editor; Mary Poth, Grant Coordinator
- Publication types: Books
- Official website: www.etruscanpress.org

Etruscan Press is a literary press associated with Wilkes University (Wilkes-Barre, Pennsylvania) in partnership with Youngstown State University (Youngstown, Ohio). The press, which was founded in 2001 by Philip Brady and Robert Mooney, specializes in publishing poetry, fiction, and creative nonfiction. The press is a member of the Community of Literary Magazines and Presses (CLMP).

== Genres ==
Etruscan Press publishes books of poems, novels, short stories, creative non-fiction, criticism, translation, and anthologies. Etruscan was one of five finalists for the 2015 AWP Small Press Publisher Award. Three works from Etruscan's collection of poetry were named finalists for the National Book Award and another was named to the Longlist (the NBA's “Top Ten” in poetry). Other titles are recipients of the Poetry Society of America's “First Book Award,” the Foreword Reviews Book of the Year Award, and PEN Oakland's “Josephine Miles Award.” Three poems published by Etruscan were selected for Best American Poetry. Most recently, titles published by Etruscan Press were awarded the Theodore Roethke Memorial Poetry Prize, Mass Book Award, nominated for the Hurston/Wright Legacy Award in Poetry, named finalists for the Foreword Reviews Book of the Year Award, Housatonic Book Award, Helen Smith Memorial Prize for Best Book of Poetry, and longlisted for the PEN/Diamonstein-Spielvogel Award for the Art of the Essay.
