= List of literary magazines =

Below is a list of literary magazines and journals: periodicals devoted to book reviews, creative nonfiction, essays, poems, short fiction, and similar literary endeavors.

- Because the majority are from the United States, the country of origin is only listed for those outside the U.S.
- Only those magazines that are exclusively published online are identified as such.

== Currently published ==
List of no longer published journals is below, with beginning and ending dates.

=== 0–9 ===
- 20x20 magazine (2008–current, United Kingdom)
- 3:AM Magazine (2000–current, online)
- 32 Poems (2003–current)

=== A ===
- Able Muse (online and print)
- Acta Victoriana (1878–current, Canada)
- Al Adab (1953–2012; online from 2015, Lebanon)
- The Adroit Journal (online)
- AGNI (1972–current)
- The Alaska Quarterly Review (1980–current)
- Alligator Juniper (1995–current)
- American Literary Review (1990–current)
- The American Poetry Review (1972–current)
- The American River Review (1984–current)
- The American Scholar (1932–current)
- American Short Fiction (1991–current)
- Ancient Paths (1998–current)
- Andromeda Spaceways Inflight Magazine (2002–current, Australia)
- Angelaki (1993–current, Britain)
- Another Chicago Magazine (1977–current)
- The Antigonish Review (1970–current, Canada)
- Antiphony Journal & Press (2024–current)
- Apalachee Review (1971–current)
- Apex Magazine (2005–current)
- Appalachian Heritage (1973–current)
- ArabLit & ArabLit Quarterly (2008–current)
- Arc Poetry Magazine (1978–current, Canada)
- The Aroostook Review (2006–current)
- Artful Dodge (1979–current)
- Ascent (online)
- Asia Literary Review (2000–current)
- Asimov's Science Fiction (1977–current)
- Australian Book Review (1961–current, Australia)

=== B ===
- BALLOONS Lit. Journal (2014-current, Hong Kong)
- Baltimore Review (1996-current)
- Bayou (2002-current)
- Bakwa Magazine (2011–current, Cameroon)
- The Bear Deluxe (1992–current)
- Beat Scene (1988-current, United Kingdom)
- Beloit Poetry Journal (1950-current)
- The Believer (2003–current)
- Bellevue Literary Review (2000-current)
- Bellingham Review (1977-current)
- Berkeley Fiction Review (1981-current)
- Black Denim Lit
- Black Warrior Review (1974–current)
- Blueprintreview (online)
- Bodega Magazine (2012-current)
- B O D Y (2012-current)
- Bokvennen litterært magasin (1989-current, Norway)
- Bomb (1981–current)
- Book Links (1990-current)
- Booklist (1905-current)
- Boston Review (1975–current)
- Boulevard (1980-current)
- The Briar Cliff Review (1989-current)
- Brevity: A Journal of Concise Literary Nonfiction (1997-current)
- Brick (1977–current, Canada)
- The Brooklyn Rail (2000--current)
- Bungakukai (1890s–current, Japan)
- Bungei (1933–current, Japan)

=== C ===
- Callaloo
- Cambridge Literary Review (2009–current, United Kingdom)
- The Capilano Review
- The Caribbean Writer
- Cenobio
- Cha: An Asian Literary Journal (2007–current, Hong Kong)
- Chapman
- Chariton Review
- The Chattahoochee Review
- Chicago Review (1946–current)
- Chiron Review
- Chimurenga magazine (2002–current, South Africa)
- Claremont Review of Books
- Clarion
- Cleveland Review of Books
- The Coffin Factory
- Colorado Review
- Columbia: A Journal of Literature and Art
- The Commonline Journal
- Concho River Review
- Confrontation
- Conjunctions
- Contemporary Verse 2 (1975–current, Canada)
- Contrary Magazine
- The Cortland Review
- Cream City Review
- Creative Flight (online)
- Creative Nonfiction
- Cricket (1973–current)
- Ctrl Z Teens (2026-current)
- CutBank
- Cyphers (Ireland)

=== D ===
- The Dark (2013–current)
- Deep Cut Magazine
- Dehak - A Magazine For Good Literature (2011–current)
- Denver Quarterly (1966–current)
- Desh (Bengali, India)
- Dialog (Poland)
- The Drift (magazine) (2020–current)
- The Dorchester Review (Canada)
- The Drouth (United Kingdom)
- Dublin Review of Books (2007–current, Ireland)
- Dunes Review
- Dusie (online, Switzerland)

=== E ===
- Eclectica Magazine (online)
- Edinburgh Review
- Electric Literature
- Emerson Review
- Enkare Review
- Epoch
- Esprit (France)
- The European Review of Books
- Evergreen Review (online)
- Existere (Canada)

=== F ===
- Fantastyka (Poland)
- Fence
- Fiction
- Fiction on the Web (1996–current, online, United Kingdom)
- Fiction Weekly (online)
- The Fiddlehead (Canada)
- FIELD
- Fifth Wednesday Journal (2007–current)
- Fine Madness (1982–2004)
- Fireweed (Canada, defunct?)
- The First Line (1999–current)
- FIYAH Literary Magazine (2017–current)
- The Florida Review (1972–current)
- Flock
- Flyway
- Folio (1985–current)
- Fourteen Hills (1994–current)
- Fugue

=== G ===
- Gangway (Australia)
- Gargoyle Magazine (1976–current)
- Geist (Canada)
- Georgetown Review
- Georgia Review
- The Gettysburg Review (defunct)
- GHLL (The Green Hills Literary Lantern) (online)
- Gigantic
- Glass Mountain
- Grain (Canada)
- Granta (United Kingdom)
- Greensboro Review
- Griffith Review (Australia)
- Grub Street
- GUD Magazine
- Guernica Magazine (online)
- Gulf Coast
- Gulf Stream Magazine (1989–current)
- Gunzo (1946–current, Japan)

=== H ===
- Hambone (1974–current)
- Harper's Magazine (1850–current)
- Harpur Palate
- Hart House Review (1992–current, Canada)
- The Harvard Advocate
- Harvard Review (1986–current)
- Harvest magazine (2008–current, Australia)
- Hayden's Ferry Review
- HEAT (1996–2011, Australia)
- Heavy Traffic (2020–current)
- Hemingway Review
- Hiram Poetry Review
- Hotel Amerika
- Hobart (online, 2001–current; print 2003–current)
- The Horn Book Magazine (1924–current)
- The Hudson Review (1947–current)

=== I ===
- Ibdaa (1983–current, Egypt)
- Image (1995–current)
- Indian Literature (1957–current, India)
- Indiana Review
- L'Infini (1983–current, France)
- Inkwell (1995–current)
- Ínsula (1946–current, Spain)
- Internationales Archiv für Sozialgeschichte der deutschen Literatur (1976–current, Germany)
- Interzone
- The Iowa Review
- Island magazine (1979–current, Australia)
- Iton 77 (Israel)

=== J ===
- Jabberwock Review (1980–current)
- Jacket Magazine (online, 1997–current)
- Al Jadid (online, 1993–current)
- James Dickey Review (1984–current)

=== K ===
- Kaurab (India)
- The Kenyon Review (1939–current)
- Kirkus Reviews
- Kwani? (2002–current, Kenya)
- The Knickerbocker (1833–1865)

=== L ===
- Lake Effect (1996–current)
- The Lakeview Review (online)
- Landfall (New Zealand)
- Lapham's Quarterly (2007–current)
- Les Écrits nouveaux (1917–1922, France)
- Library Journal Book Review
- The Lifted Brow (Australia)
- Light (1992–current)
- Literal Latte (online)
- Literary Review (United Kingdom)
- The Literary Review (United States)
- Literary Review of Canada
- Literatura na Świecie (Poland)
- Locus (1968–current)
- Loggernaut (online)
- The London Magazine (United Kingdom)
- London Review of Books (United Kingdom)
- Long River Review (1997–current)
- Los Angeles Review of Books (2011–current)
- Louisiana Literature (1984–current)
- Lowestoft Chronicle (2009–current)

=== M ===
- Maayan (Israel)
- Macabre Cadaver (online)
- The Magazine of Fantasy & Science Fiction
- Magma Poetry (1994–current, London)
- The Malahat Review (1967–current, Canada)
- El Malpensante (1996–current, Colombia)
- Manoa (1989–current)
- Margie
- The Massachusetts Review (1959–current)
- The Masters Review (2009–current)
- Meanjin (1940–current, Australia)
- Mekong Review (2015–current)
- Michigan Quarterly Review (1962–current)
- Mid-American Review (1981–current)
- The Midland (1915–1933)
- The Minnesota Review (1960–current)
- The Missouri Review (1978–current)
- Modern Chinese Literature and Culture
- Modern Haiku
- Monkeybicycle (2002–current)
- Moondance (online)
- Muse India (online)

=== N ===
- n+1 (2004–current)
- Narrative Magazine (online and anthology)
- Nat. Brut (online and anthology)
- Natural Bridge (1999–current)
- Nea Estia (1927–current, Greece)
- Neith (1903–1904)
- New American Writing (1986–current)
- The New Criterion (1982–current)
- New Delta Review
- New England Review
- New Letters (1970–current)
- New Nottingham Journal
- The New Quarterly (1981–current, Canada)
- New South
- New York Quarterly (1933–current)
- The New York Review of Books
- The New York Times Book Review
- The New Yorker (1925–current)
- News from the Republic of Letters
- The Newtowner: An Arts and Literary Magazine
- NOON (2000–current)
- North American Review
- North Dakota Quarterly
- Nuori Voima (1908–current; Finland)
- Nouvelle Revue Française (France)
- Novy Mir (Russia)
- Nowe Książki (Poland)

=== O ===
- October Hill Magazine (2017-current; United States)
- Odra (Poland)
- Okno (1923–1924; 2007–current, Russia)
- Oktyabr (1924–current; Russia)
- One Story (2002–current)
- The Ontario Review (1974–2008)
- Opium Magazine (online, 2001–current)
- Orion
- Overland (1954–current, Australia)
- Owen Wister Review (1978–current)
- Oxford American (1992–current)
- The Oxonian Review (United Kingdom, 2001–current)
- Oyez Review (1965–current)

=== P ===
- P. N. Review (United Kingdom)
- The Paris Review
- Parnassus (Northern Essex Community College; 1965–current)
- Parnassus (New York; 1973–2019)
- Parting Gifts
- PEN America
- Perigee: Publication for the Arts (online)
- Permafrost
- Pessoa (online, Brazil, 2010–current)
- Phoebe (1971–current)
- Pinball (2012–current)
- The Pinch
- Pine Row Press (journal, press) (2020–current)
- Pleiades
- Ploughshares
- Poesia
- Poetry (1912–current)
- Poetry International (1997–current)
- Poetry Ireland Review (Ireland)
- Poetry Kanto (Japan, 1968–current)
- Poetry Review (United Kingdom)
- Poetry Wales (1965–current)
- The Point (2008–current)
- Polja (Serbia)
- Post Road
- Potomac Review
- Prairie Fire (Canada)
- Prairie Schooner (1926–current)
- PRISM international (Canada)
- Progetto Babele (Italy)
- Prose Studies (1977-present)
- Provincetown Arts
- A Public Space (2006–current)
- Puerto del Sol (1960–current)
- Puzha Magazine (Malayalam Online, India)

=== Q ===
- Quadrant (1956–current, Australia)
- Quarterly Literary Review Singapore (Singapore)
- Quarterly West

=== R ===
- Raritan Quarterly Review
- Rattle
- The Reader (United Kingdom)
- Red Leaves / 紅葉 (Australia)
- Red Lightbulbs (online)
- Reed Magazine (1867–current)
- RHINO Poetry (1976–current)
- Ricepaper Magazine
- River Styx Magazine
- Roanoke Review (1967–current)
- La Ronda (1919–1923) (Italy)
- Room (Canada, 1975–current, formerly Room of One's Own)

=== S ===
- St. Petersburg Review
- Salmagundi
- Saranac Review
- School Library Journal
- School Magazine (Australia)
- The Seattle Review
- Sensitive Skin Magazine
- The Sewanee Review
- Shenandoah
- Shinchō (Japan)
- Smartish Pace
- Shi'r (1964–1969; Lebanon)
- Sixth Finch (2008–current)
- Slipstream
- SNReview (online)
- Sonora Review
- The South Carolina Review
- South Dakota Review
- Southerly (1932–current, Australia)
- Southern Humanities Review
- Southern Indiana Review
- Southern Quarterly Review
- The Southern Review
- Southwest Review
- Space and Time
- Spoon River Poetry Review
- StepAway Magazine (United Kingdom)
- The Stinging Fly (Ireland)
- StoryQuarterly
- storySouth
- Straylight Magazine
- Structo (2008–current, United Kingdom)
- Stuck in the Library
- Subtropics
- The Sun Magazine
- Superstition Review
- SurVision Magazine
- Swamp pink (magazine)
- Swedish Book Review (Sweden)
- Sycamore Review

=== T ===
- Taco Bell Quarterly (2019–current)
- Taddle Creek (1997–current, Canada)
- Talking River Review (1996–current)
- Tampa Review (1964–current)
- Tar River Poetry (1960–current)
- Tarpaulin Sky (online 2002–current; print 2007–current)
- Textsound (online, 2008–current)
- Thaunkanhe (1951–current, Nepal)
- The Threepenny Review (1980–current)
- The #TWP Quarterly Lit Zine (2020-current)
- Third Coast (1995–current)
- Timber Creek Review (1992–current)
- The Times Literary Supplement
- Timothy McSweeney's Quarterly Concern (1998–current)
- Tin House (1998–current)
- Tinpahar (2012–current)
- Triple Canopy (online, 2008–current)
- TriQuarterly (1958–current)
- Tulane Review (1988–current)

=== U ===
- Underground Voices
- Uncharted Magazine (2021–current, online)

=== V ===
- Varlık (Turkey)
- Vinduet (Norway)
- Virginia Quarterly Review (1926–current)
- Voiceworks (1985–current, Australia)

=== W ===
- WALL Literary Journal (2000–current)
- War, Literature & the Arts (1989–current)
- Wasafiri (1984–current, United Kingdom)
- Washington Square Review (1994–current)
- Weber Studies (1984–current)
- Weird Tales (1923–current)
- West Branch (1977–current)
- Westerly (1956–current, Australia)
- Wilderness House Literary Review (online)
- Willow Springs (1977–current)
- Witness (1987–current)
- The Wolf (2002–current)
- Word Riot (online)
- World Literature Today (1977–current)
- Wormwood (United Kingdom)
- The Write Place At the Write Time (2008–current)
- Writer and Reader (1888)

=== X ===
- Xavier Review (1980–current)

=== Y ===
- The Yale Review (1819–current)
- Yemassee (1993–current)

=== Z ===
- Znamya (Russia)
- Zoetrope: All-Story (1997–current)
- Zvezda (Russia)
- ZYX (1990–current)
- Zyzzyva (1985–current)

== Magazines which are no longer published ==
- Adam Sanat (Turkey, 1985–2005)
- The American Mercury (United States, 1924–1981)
- American Review, formerly New American Review (1967–1977)
- Antaeus (Morocco and United States, 1970–1994)
- The Antioch Review (1941–2020)
- Anything That Moves (United States, 1990–2002)
- Araragi (Japan, 1908–1997)
- Areté (1999–2020, United Kingdom)
- Ars Interpres (Sweden, 2003–2012)
- Athenaeum (United Kingdom, 1828–1921)
- Avery Anthology (United States, 2006-2012)
- Bananas (United Kingdom, 1975–1981)
- The Beau (United Kingdom, 1981–1984)
- The Bell (Ireland, 1940–1954)
- The Bellman (literary magazine) (1906–1919)
- The Bibelot (United States, 1895–1914)
- Black Clock (2004-2016)
- Blast (United Kingdom, 1914–1915)
- Bookforum (1994–2022)
- The Bookman (United States, 1895–1933)
- The Bookman (United Kingdom, 1891–1934)
- Bordercrossing Berlin (Germany, 2006–2008)
- Botteghe Oscure (Italy, 1948–1960)
- The Century Magazine (United States, 1881–1930)
- Chelsea (United States, 1958–2007)
- The Christian Spectator (United States, 1819–1843)
- CLUTCH (United States, 1991–1998)
- Contempo (United States, 1931–1934)
- The Criterion (United Kingdom, 1922–1939)
- December (1958–2025)
- Descant (Canada, 1970–2015)
- The Dial (United States, 1840–1929)
- The Dome (United Kingdom, 1897–1900)
- The Dublin Magazine (Ireland, 1923–1958)
- Edinburgh Review (United Kingdom, 1822–1929)
- The Egoist (United Kingdom, 1914–1919)
- Encounter (United Kingdom, 1953–1991)
- The English Intelligencer (United Kingdom, 1966–1968)
- The Glebe (United States, 1913–1914)
- Glimmer Train (United States, 1990–2019)
- Grand Street (United States, 1981–2004)
- The Harvard Monthly (United States, 1885–1917)
- Horizon (United Kingdom, 1940–1949)
- Ireland Today (Ireland, 1936–1938)
- jubilat (United States, 2000–2021)
- The Lace Curtain (Ireland, 1969–1978)
- The Little Review (United States, 1914–1929)
- Memewar (Canada, 2006–2010)
- The Messenger (United States, 1917–1928)
- Modern Review (United Kingdom, 1991–1995)
- Moody Street Irregulars (United States, 1978–1992)
- Muschelhaufen (Germany, 1962–2008)
- The Nebraska Review (United States, 1972–2003)
- Nemonymous (United Kingdom, 2001–2010?)
- The New Englander (United States, 1843–1884)
- New World Writing (United States, 1951–1964)
- New Yorkshire Writing (United Kingdom, 1977–1979)
- Nyugat (Hungary)
- Nineteenth Century (and After) (United Kingdom, 1877–1972)
- Nocturnal Submissions (Australia, 1991–1999)
- Literary Garland (Canada, 1838—1851)
- Old Crow Review (United States, 1990–2005)
- Ole' Magazine (United States, c. 1966?)
- One cool word (Canada, 2006–2013)
- One Throne Magazine (Canada, online, 2014–2015)
- Optimism Monthly (Czech Republic, 1995–2009)
- Others: A Magazine of the New Verse (United States, 1915–1919)
- Partisan Review (United States, 1934–2003)
- Pearl (United States, 1974–2014)
- Pen Pusher (United Kingdom, 2005–2011)
- Pertinent (Australia, 1940–1947)
- The Port Folio (United States, 1800–1814)
- Puck (United States, 1984–1997)
- Quarterly Review of Literature (United States, 1943–1999)
- The Quiet Feather (United Kingdom, 2003–2007)
- Ramparts (United States, 1962–1975)
- Revue de Paris (France, 1829–????)
- San Francisco Review of Books (United States, 1975–1997)
- The Savoy (United Kingdom, 1896)
- Scribner's Magazine (United States, 1887–1939)
- Scripsi (Australia, 1981–1994)
- Shadowed Realms (online, 2004–2006)
- Shirakaba (Japan, 1910–1923)
- The Smart Set (United States, 1900–1930)
- Story (Austria and U.S., 1931–2000)
- Tel Quel (France, 1960–1982)
- The Transatlantic Review (France/UK, 1924)
- Transatlantic Review (US/UK, 1959–1977)
- Transition (France, 1927–1938)
- Vedem (Czech Republic, 1942–1944)
- VOU (Japan, 1935–1978)
- Wet Ink (Australia)
- Wheelhouse Magazine (2007–2013)
- The White Review (2011–2024)
- X (United Kingdom, 1959–1962)
- Yale Review (United States, 1885–1892)
- The Yankee (United States, 1828–1829)
- The Yellow Book (United Kingdom, 1894–1897)

== See also ==
- Council of Literary Magazines and Presses
- List of art magazines
- List of political magazines
- Science fiction magazine
- Fantasy fiction magazine
- Horror fiction magazine
