= William James Austin =

American poet (1949–2019)

William James Austin (December 4, 1949 – August 15, 2019) was a New York City poet, writer, musician, visual artist, and academic. Austin received his PhD on fellowship from Tulane University in New Orleans, and was an associate professor of English and philosophy, and artistic director of the Visiting Writers Program at SUNY, Farmingdale. He is the author of five collections of poetry, essays, and "photopo", plus a book length study of T.S. Eliot and Jacques Derrida. His visual art has been exhibited in the United States, Germany, and Mexico.

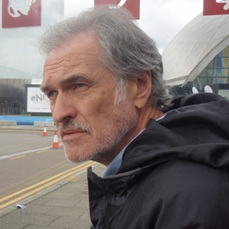
William James Austin 2012

== Works ==
- 1 Underworld 2 (1994)
- A Deconstruction of T. S. Eliot: The Fire and the Rose (1996)
- 3 Underworld 4 (1998)
- 5 Underworld 6 (2000)
- 7 Underwor(l)d 8: Transtextual (2004)
- 9 Underwor(l)d 0: Desolation Paradise (2006)

William James Austin's poetry, fiction, theoretical essays, book reviews, letters and visual art have appeared or been exhibited in the Paterson Literary Review, the American Book Review, Blaze, Louisiana Literature, ''The New Laurel Review, Xavier Review, Koja, Black October, The Small Press Review, Boston Literary Review (BluR), Masthead, The World Healing Book (a 9/11 anthology from Iceland), Fell Swoop, Appearances, "A Shout in the Street" (as Allen Ginsberg's B-side), the Tulane Literary Review, The Chronicle of the Louisiana Endowment for the Humanities, "Scrambled Eggs", Timbuktu, Contemporary Jewish-American Dramatists and Poets (Greenwood Press), Spidertangle: The Book (by Miekal And), "Gallerichickenscratch", American Poetry (by Igor Satanovsky), Magazinnik (in Russian translation), Vozdukh (in Russian translation), the Contemporary Review, "xStream", Here and Now (Boston Public Radio), E·ratio, Moria, Turntable and Blue Light, the Istanbul Literary Review, Caietele Internaţionale de Poezie (International Notebook of Poetry; in Romanian translation), Origini (pub. LiterArt XXI, sponsored by the International Association of Romanian Writers and Artists, Inc.), The June 30 Manifesto (ed. John M. Bennett and Scott Helmes; Luna Bisonte Prods), Black Zinnias (sponsored by the California Institute of Arts and Letters), "The Best of Generator Press" (CD-ROM), Le Cirque: The Soundtrack (audio CD), Fieralingue (Italian journal of arts and letters), the Durban-Segnini Gallery (Miami, FL), Gallery 324 (Cleveland, OH), Tacheles (Berlin), the Fort Worth Art Center (Fort Worth, TX), and other venues.

In Manhattan he has performed at the Poetry Project, Ear Inn, the Knitting Factory, the Bowery Club, KGB, and similar venues. In addition, and often in conjunction with the eclectic concert event, Cirque du Singe Brisé, he performs in cities and at universities throughout the USA northeast.

Along with Igor Satanovsky, Julia Solis, Bill Keith, Richard Kostelanetz, and a growing list of experimental Russian language writers, William James Austin publishes with Koja Press which has been featured in a New York Times article, on BBC News, and on NTV.

In his youth, Austin was signed to Wes Farrell's Pocket Full of Tunes as a songwriter. He composed music and lyrics for Lou Rawls, the fusion group, Hammer, a television sitcom, and other rock and jazz artists, as well as serving as backup band leader and lead guitarist for the Capris. He also performed at the Cafe Bizarre, the Bitter End, and similar Greenwich Village venues.

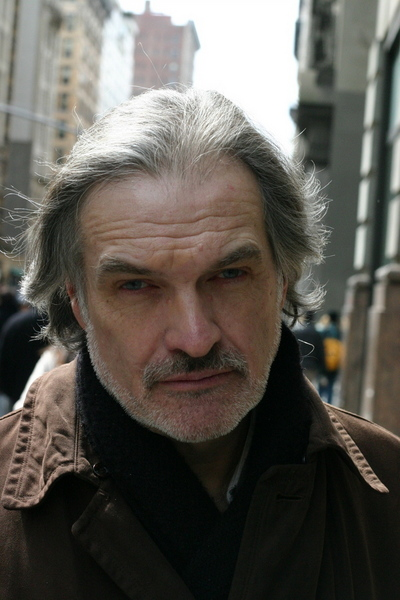
William James Austin 2010

== Awards et al ==
Austin's poetry has won a number of awards, including an AWP award, two nominations for the Pushcart Prize by Richard Kostelanetz and Boston Literary Review (BluR), a Here and Now (Boston Public Radio) award, the John Golden Award for excellence in poetry, the Phyllis Bartlett Award for original use of language in poetry, the James Tobin Award, the James Kruezer Award, and second place in the Allen Ginsberg Poetry Award competition.

In 2001 and again in 2010 he performed at the Ohio State University Avant-Garde Symposium. A Russian translation of his long poem, "aeneas in hell," was the subject of a session at the Stevens Institute of Technology Biennial Conference for Contemporary Literary Translation in 2002.

He has been filmed or interviewed by PBS, NTV, Boston/Cambridge local television, the Červená Barva Press interview series, and for the Romanian journal, Caietele Internaţionale de Poezie. In addition, his poetry and poetics are featured on a series of postcards issued by Červená Barva Press, and have been translated by, and are the subject of several articles by, Romanian and Russian artists, scholars, critics and translators,

In 2011 he completed a reading tour of Russia, performing in Moscow, St. Petersburg, and featured at the International Writers Festival in Peterhof.
