= Fiction Weekly =

American magazine

Fiction Weekly was an American literary magazine based in Lake Charles, Louisiana. Fiction Weekly was conceived in the summer of 2008 by members of the McNeese State University MFA Program in creative writing. As its name suggests, Fiction Weekly publishes on a weekly basis; it is published exclusively on the internet and features one previously unpublished piece of fiction on its front page each week.

Authors published in Fiction Weekly have appeared in anthologies such as New Stories From the South, have been nominated for the Pushcart Prize, and have been published in many other well reputed literary magazines including, Glimmer Train, The Pinch, and Harpur Palate.

However, as of May 2010, the website had not been updated for six months. It was stated that the magazine ceased publication.

== Notable Contributors ==
Michael Knight, Anya Groner, Ryan Crider, Michelle Reed, Josh Canipe, and Paul Michel.

== See also ==
- List of literary magazines
