= Devon J. Moore =

American poet and author (born 1982)

- Born: November 27, 1982 (age 42)
- Education: M.F.A., Syracuse University, Syracuse, NY; M.S., CUNY Lehman College, Bronx, NY; B.A., New York University, New York, NY
- Occupation(s): Poet, Professor
- Notable work: Apology of a Girl Who Is Told She Is Going To Hell
- Style: Poetry
- Website: DevonJMoore.com

Devon Jean Moore (born November 27, 1982) is an American poet and author.

== Biography ==
Moore is a native of Buffalo, NY, USA. A former Syracuse University Fellow, she has an MFA in creative writing from Syracuse University. She currently lives in Syracuse, NY, USA where she teaches writing at Syracuse University and SUNY Oswego.

Her poems have appeared in or are forthcoming from Gulf Coast, and have also appeared in Foothill, Cider Press Review, Harpur Palate, Ovenbird, The Cortland Review, Meridian, New Ohio Review, Stone Canoe, and Juked.

Her first poetry book, Apology of a Girl Who Is Told She Is Going to Hell, which was a semi-finalist for the 2013 Crab Orchard First Book Award and the University of Wisconsin Press Brittingham and Pollak poetry series, was released from Mayapple Press in May 2015.

== Awards ==
=== Poetry awards ===
- Crab Orchard Review First Book Award, Semi-Finalist, 2013
- The University of Wisconsin Press Brittingham and Felix Pollak Prizes, Semi-Finalist, 2013 and 2012
- Juniper Summer Writing Institute Scholarship, 2012

=== Creative nonfiction honors and awards ===
- Constance Saltonstall Foundation of The Arts, Juried Fellow, June 2015
- Joyce Carol Oates’ Award in Nonfiction Winner, May 2011
- Syracuse University's AWP Intro Journals Project Creative Nonfiction Nominee, 2012

=== Scholarly and teaching awards ===
- Syracuse University Fellowship (a full Fellowship through the Creative Writing Program), 2009–2010, 2011-2012
- NYC Teaching Fellows’ Classroom Excellence Award Nominee, 2008

== Collections ==
- Apology of A Girl Who Is Told She Is Going To Hell. Mayapple Press. May 1983. ISBN 978-1-936419-54-8.

Before acceptance by Mayapple Press, this book was a semi-finalist for the 2013 Crab Orchard First Book Award and the University of Wisconsin Press Brittingham and Pollak poetry series. In this collection of poems, Moore weaves the intersecting themes of her father's death, her family's history of battling addictions, living with the grief and loss that accompanied both of those things, recognizing the wonder in the everyday, and the search to find one's place (not only for the poetic "I" of her poems, but also for the characters who populate her poetry) in a world that has been characterized from childhood as a place of indefatigable longing. The poet, Erika Meitner, has called her book "a moving, elemental debut [that] is part autobiography of toughness and part meditation on desire." And the poet, National Book Award finalist Bruce Smith, writes "Devon Moore makes spaces that are theaters for the soul [...] What I like best about Moore’s work is the great reciprocity, the generosity that allows the ‘closeness to what hurts us’ be conducted into our being."

== Publications ==
- Gulf Coast, November 2012, "Red."
- Harpur Palate, Vol. 12 No. 1, Fall 2012, "Why I Return to West Avenue, Driving Down the Street Slow" and "Skeleton Pier."
- Stone Canoe: A Journal of Arts, Literature, and Social Commentary, Issue 6, 2012, "Patricide."
