= Marc Jampole =

American poet

- Born: 24 July 1950 (age 76); New York City
- Occupations: Public Relations Executive; Poet; Television news reporter

Marc Jampole (born July 24, 1950) is an American poet, novelist, public relations executive, former television news reporter and political blogger.

== Background and education ==
In the 1970s, Jampole taught French and German language and literature and filmmaking at the University of Washington. He also made several avant-garde films that were shown at a number of independent film festivals.

== Career ==
Jampole formed Jampole Communications, Inc. in 1989. As principal, Jampole wrote more than 1,800 articles and was a well-known speaker on media-relations and crisis communications. He was frequently quoted in the mass media as a public relations expert. Jampole also developed communications plans for more than 100 crises and handled three of the largest Chapter 11 bankruptcies in American history - the bankruptcy of Allegheny International and two Penn Traffic Company bankruptcies. At the end of 2016, Jampole sold the operations of Jampole Communications to Pittsburgh-based Wordwrite Communications, where he serves as executive vice president.”

Jampole also writes for Jewish Currents and served on its editorial board.

== Poetry ==
Jampole has published one book of poetry, Music From Words (Bellday Books 2007). His poems have been published in many poetry journals and anthologies, including The Mississippi Review, The Evansville Review, The Courtland Review, Vallum, Cutthroat, Slant Magazine, Illumen, Oxford Magazine, Janus Head, Only the Sea Keeps (2005 Bayeaux Arts Press), Wilderness House Literary Review, Ellipsis, Journey (2009 Eden Waters Press), and Acapella Zoo, among others. Four of his poems were nominated for the Pushcart Prize in 2008.

Slant: A Journal of Poetry references Marc Jampole as a poet whose work verges on the experimental or brash.

Jampole's work is rarely autobiographical. The narrators in his poems are sometimes famous people, biblical or historical figures and sometimes ordinary people at a point of epiphany or anagnorisis. In one poem, a real-estate agent who thinks he's Moses sees the burning bush in an upscale suburb. In others, Gilgamesh gets caught in a traffic jam, Blaise Pascal faces a crisis of faith and faith in reason, a former whiz kid disassociates into psychosis and Hugo Ball, one of the founders of the Dada movement, sells his wife to soldiers. He also writes in reaction to world events, such as the 2004 tsunami in Southeast Asia.

== Novels ==
In 2021, Jampole published his first novel, The Brothers Silver with Owl Canyon Press. This debut novel follows a pair of brothers as they navigate personal trauma against the backdrop of America’s changing landscape during the latter half of the 20th century. Unlike Jampole's poetry, The Brother Silvers incorporates autobiographical elements. The novel is told through multiple perspectives and explores themes such as trauma, politics, and Judaism.

Reception of The Brothers Silver was largely positive, with American Book Review describing Jampole’s writing as “robust with poetic prose and intriguing characters living in extreme circumstances that most of us will relate to in our own individual ways.” The Vassar Review called it “the kind of book you want to talk with someone about after reading."The Brothers Silver was a finalist in 2022 for the Next Generation Indie Book Award in Fiction.

== Works ==
=== Books ===
- Music from Words (Bellday Books 2007)
- The Brothers Silver (Owl Canyon Press 2021)

=== Anthologies ===
- The Great American Wise Ass Poetry Anthology (2016)
- And Love (Jacar Press 2012)
- Fusion of Form (2009)
- Bagel Bards IV (2009) and V (2010)
- Natural Language (Carnegie Library of Pittsburgh 2010)
- Journey (Eden Waters Press 2009)
- A Poet's Haggadah (Ain't Got No Press 2008)
- Along These Rivers (Quadrant Publishing 2008)
- Only the Sea Keeps (Bayeaux Arts 2005)

=== Literary publications ===
- 580 Split
- Acapella Zoo
- Big City Lit
- China Grove
- Cortland Review
- Curbside Review
- Cutthroat
- Ellipsis
- Illumen
- Janus Head
- Jewish Currents
- Main Street Rag
- Miracle
- Mississippi Review
- Orphic Lute
- Oxford Magazine
- Paper Street
- Peralta Press
- Pittsburgh Poetry Review
- Pittsburgh Quarterly
- Rat’s Ass Review
- Recours au Poéme
- Rune
- Sin Fronteras
- Slant: A Journal of Poetry
- The Evansville Review
- Vallum
- White Pelican Review
- Wilderness House Review
- Yawp!

=== Films ===
- Landscapes of Desire - 2012

=== OpEdge Blog ===
Jampole has written the OpEdge blog since 2009. OpEdge discusses the political and social issues of the day from a left-wing point of view, often using academic and secondary research to make the case for his views, including raising taxes on the wealthy, cutting the military budget and turning away from the celebrity-fueled culture of consumption. National Public Radio and other media have frequently quoted or referenced OpEdge articles. OpEdge articles also often appears on the websites of The Progressive Populist, Jewish Currents,and Vox Populi.
