= Jackie Craven =

American poet

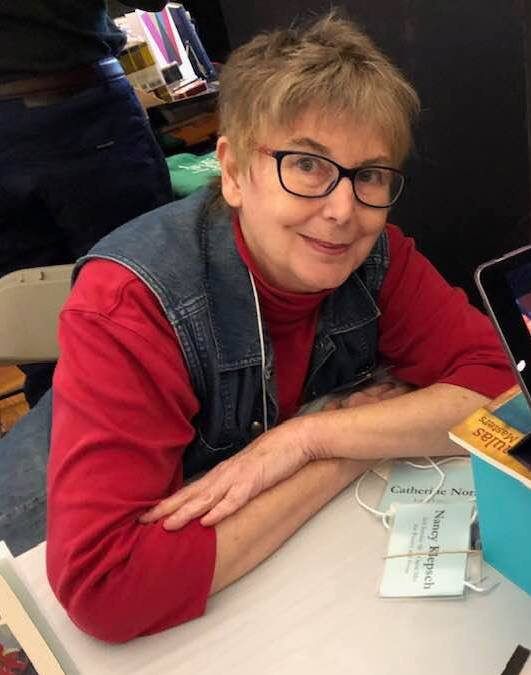
- Jackie Craven at the Albany Book Festival, Albany, NY, September 14, 2019
- Education: State University of New York
- Writing career
- Genres: Poetry; non-fiction

Jackie Craven is an American poet and author with a broad background in arts and the humanities.

== Career ==
Her collection, WHISH, won the 2024 Press 53 Award for Poetry. Other books include Secret Formulas & Techniques of the Masters (Brick Road Poetry Press, 2018) and two chapbooks, Cyborg Sister (Headmistress Press competition finalist, 2021) and Our Lives Became Unmanageable (Omnidawn award for fabulist fiction, 2016). Her publications also include two books on home décor, articles on architecture and design, travel essays, poetry, fiction, and literary commentary.

For twenty years, Craven wrote about literature, art, architecture, design, and other topics for ThoughtCo, an online resource that evolved from About.com. Craven's literary writing has been published in various journals, including AGNI (magazine), The Alaska Quarterly Review, The Cincinnati Review, Mid-American Review, New Ohio Review, River Styx (magazine), Existere, The Fourth River, SNReview, Pearl (literary magazine), Pleiades (journal), Ploughshares, Poet Lore, and The Asheville Poetry Review. She is a member of the North American Travel Journalists Association (NATJA), and her travel features have been published in major newspapers in the United States and Canada. She wrote a monthly column for House & Garden magazine, and published many features in The Providence Journal and other newspapers. Previously, she worked as an architecture writer for Realtor magazine.

She holds a Doctor of Arts in English from the State University of New York at Albany. Craven lives in Schenectady, New York and Cocoa Beach, Florida.

== Selected works ==
=== Electronic literature ===
Jackie Craven attended Robert Kendall's course on Hypertext in 1995. Her electronic literature In the Changing Room got published in 1998.

=== Chapbooks ===
- Cyborg Sister. Headmistress Press (2022)
- Our Lives Became Unmanageable. Omnidawn Publishing (2016)

=== Books ===
- WHISH, Press 53 (2024)
- Secret Formulas & Techniques of the Masters. Brick Road Poetry Press (2018)
- The Stress-Free Home: Beautiful Interiors for Serenity and Harmonious Living. Rockport Publishers / Quarry Books (2003)
- The Healthy Home: Beautiful Interiors That Enhance the Environment and Your Well-Being. Rockport Publishers / Quarry Books (2003)
- The Healthy Home Korean Translation. (2008)
- The Healthy Home German Translation. (2008)
