= Bayou (magazine) =

American literary magazine

- Discipline: Literary journal
- Language: English
- Edited by: Joanna Leake

Publication details
- History: 2002–present
- Publisher: Creative Writing Workshop; University of New Orleans (United States)
- Frequency: Biannual

Standard abbreviations
- ISO 4: Bayou

Indexing
- ISSN: 1935-1305

Links
- Journal homepage

Bayou is a major American literary magazine based at the University of New Orleans. The magazine was established in 2002 and is published on a biannual basis. It features poetry, fiction, essays and the winner of the annual Tennessee Williams One-Act Play Contest. Bayou published through the dislocations surrounding the aftermath of Hurricane Katrina.

Work that has appeared in Bayou has been short-listed for the Pushcart Prize.

== Notable contributors ==
Jacob M. Appel; Sean Beaudoin; Mark Doty; Marilyn Hacker; Lyn Lifshin; Timothy Liu; Virgil Suarez; Tom Whalen

== See also ==
- List of literary magazines
