= Ethan Paquin =

American poet

Ethan Paquin is an American poet and a native of New Hampshire.

== Biography ==
Ethan Paquin grew up in Londonderry, New Hampshire. He earned a BA in English/writing from Plymouth State University in Plymouth, New Hampshire, and his MFA in creative writing from the MFA Program for Poets & Writers, University of Massachusetts Amherst. He is founding editor of the online literary journal Slope, which he launched in 1999, and co-founded with Christopher Janke the nonprofit poetry press Slope Editions in 2001. He previously taught at Plymouth State University, the University of Massachusetts Lowell, Medaille College in Buffalo, New York, and in the writing program at the University of Massachusetts Amherst. Ethan presently lives in rural Mississippi.

His book The Violence (2005) was the runner-up for the 2005 Poetry Society of America William Carlos Williams Award. His writing has been published in journals including Colorado Review, Fence, Verse, The Boston Review, Boulevard, New American Writing, Quarterly West, Pleiades, Esquire, Jacket (Australia), and Meanjin (Australia). His literary criticism has appeared in journals including The Boston Review, Verse, Canadian Review of Books, and Contemporary Poetry Review. Paquin's books have been reviewed in publications including The Times Literary Supplement, Poetry Review, PN Review, New Review of Literature, and Publishers Weekly.

== Selected publications ==
=== Books ===
- The Makeshift (Stride Publications, 2002) ISBN 978-1900152808
- Accumulus (Salt Publishing, 2003) ISBN 9781844710157
- The Violence (Ahsahta Press, 2005) ISBN 978-0916272852
- My Thieves (Salt Publishing, 2007) ISBN 9781844713233
- Cloud vs. Cloud (Ahsahta Press, 2013) ISBN 978-1934103388

=== Chapbooks ===
- Nineains (Hand Held Editions, 2008)
- Deafening Leafening (Pilot Books, 2009) with Matt Hart

=== Anthologies ===
Paquin's poetry has been included in:

- Isn't It Romantic: 100 Love Poems by Younger American Poets. Brett Fletcher Lauer and Aimee Kelley, editors. (Wave Books, 2002) ISBN 978-0974635316
- Legitimate Dangers: American Poets of the New Century. Michael Dumanis and Cate Marvin, editors. (Sarabande Books, 2005) ISBN 978-1932511291
- French Connections: A Gathering of Franco-American Poets. Christine Gelineau and Jack B. Bedell, editors. (Louisiana Literature Press, 2006) ISBN 978-0945083016
- Joyful Noise: An Anthology of American Spiritual Poetry. Robert Strong, editor. (Autumn House Press, 2007) ISBN 978-1932870121
