= New South (disambiguation) =

New South or The New South was a slogan in the history of the American South first used after the American Civil War.

New South or The New South may also refer to:

- New South (magazine), an American print literary magazine published twice a year by Georgia State University
- New South (band), a Bluegrass band formed in 1971 by banjo player J. D. Crowe.
- New South Hall, a residence hall at Georgetown University
- New South Outdoor, LLC, an American outdoor advertising company
- The New South (play), a 1892 play by Clay M. Greene and Joseph R. Grismer

== See also ==
- New South Wales

Hank Williams JR "The New South"
