= Peter A. Balaskas =

American writer

Peter A. Balaskas (born 1969 in Brooklyn, New York) is an American author of speculative fiction.

Balaskas received his BS in Chemistry (minor in English) and his MA in English with a double emphasis in Creative Writing and Literature from Loyola Marymount University in Los Angeles. Before focusing on professional writing, Balaskas worked as an environmental chemist, a theatre actor, a page for NBC Studios, a camera technician for the soap opera Passions, and a copy editor. His fiction and poetry have been published in The Aroostook Review, Del Sol Review, Neon Beam Magazine, Pale Skies, Sage of Consciousness, Bewildering Stories, and his critical essay on Harlan Ellison's "I Have No Mouth and I Must Scream" was published in Criterion. He cites Ray Bradbury, Isaac Asimov, Harlan Ellison, Edgar Allan Poe, H.P. Lovecraft, and Stephen King as some of his early influences.

Balaskas is perhaps best known for his award-winning novella, The Grandmaster, a supernatural tale about a Jewish prisoner during the Holocaust who uses psionic powers to liberate a concentration camp. Published in 2007 by Bards and Sages Publishing, the book won the Best Science Fiction novel at both the Hollywood Book Festival and New England Book Festival in 2008, and was a top ten finalist in the 2007 Preditors and Editors Reader's Poll. He was also named 2009 Publicist of the Year by the Book Publicists of Southern California.

In 2004, Balaskas created Ex Machina Press, a micro press that produces the annual anthology Silent Voices: A Creative Mosaic of Fiction, for which he served as sole-founder and Managing Editor. Due to the recession, he closed Ex Machina Press and is now dedicating his time to his fiction writing.
