= Parting gift =

A parting gift is a gift given to or by someone who is leaving: a leaving present.

Parting gift or Parting Gifts may also refer to:

- "Parting Gift", a song by American singer Fiona Apple
- Parting Gifts (journal), an American literary magazine based in North Carolina
- Parting Gifts, episode 10 of the television show Angel (season 1)
- Parting Gift (band), an English rock band from Manchester
