= Cha: An Asian Literary Journal =

English literary journal

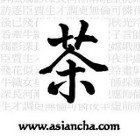
- Available in: English
- Website: http://www.asiancha.com/
- Launched: November 2007
- Current status: Online

Cha: An Asian Literary Journal is an online English literary journal based in Hong Kong. It publishes poetry, fiction, creative nonfiction, book reviews, photography and art, with a focus on Asia-related creative works and pieces by Asian writers and artists.

== History ==
Hong Kong native Tammy Lai-Ming Ho and Canadian native Jeff Zroback founded the journal in 2007. When originally founded, Cha was the only online literary journal in the city. Cha has since been highlighted in a number of places, such as by The Hindu newspaper and the UCLA Asian American Studies Center, which noted the journal is among a group of new online journals embracing a "pan-Asian perspective." Ho is the journal's editor-in-chief, translation editor, and reviews editor.

== Contributors ==
Former contributors to the journal include Ai Weiwei, Louie Crew, Duo Duo, Eleanor Goodman, Ma. Luisa Aguilar Igloria, Alan Jefferies, Sushma Joshi, Christopher Kelen, Shirley Lim, Lyn Lifshin, Alvin Pang, Todd Swift, Amy Uyematsu, Eliot Weinberger, Alison Wong, Cyril Wong, Bryan Thao Worra, Xu Xi and Ouyang Yu.

== Honors ==
Cha was named Best New Online Magazine in 2008 and Best Online Magazine in 2011 by StorySouth's Million Writers Award and was named The Gatekeeper's Site of the Week on Meet at the Gate, the website of Scottish publisher Canongate Books. Work from Cha was chosen for inclusion in the Best of the Web and Best of the Net anthologies in 2009. The journal also features a critique piece, "A Cup of Fine Tea," in which previously published works are discussed.

== See also ==
- List of literary magazines
