= Tomasz Łubieński (journalist) =

Polish journalist and writer (1938–2024)

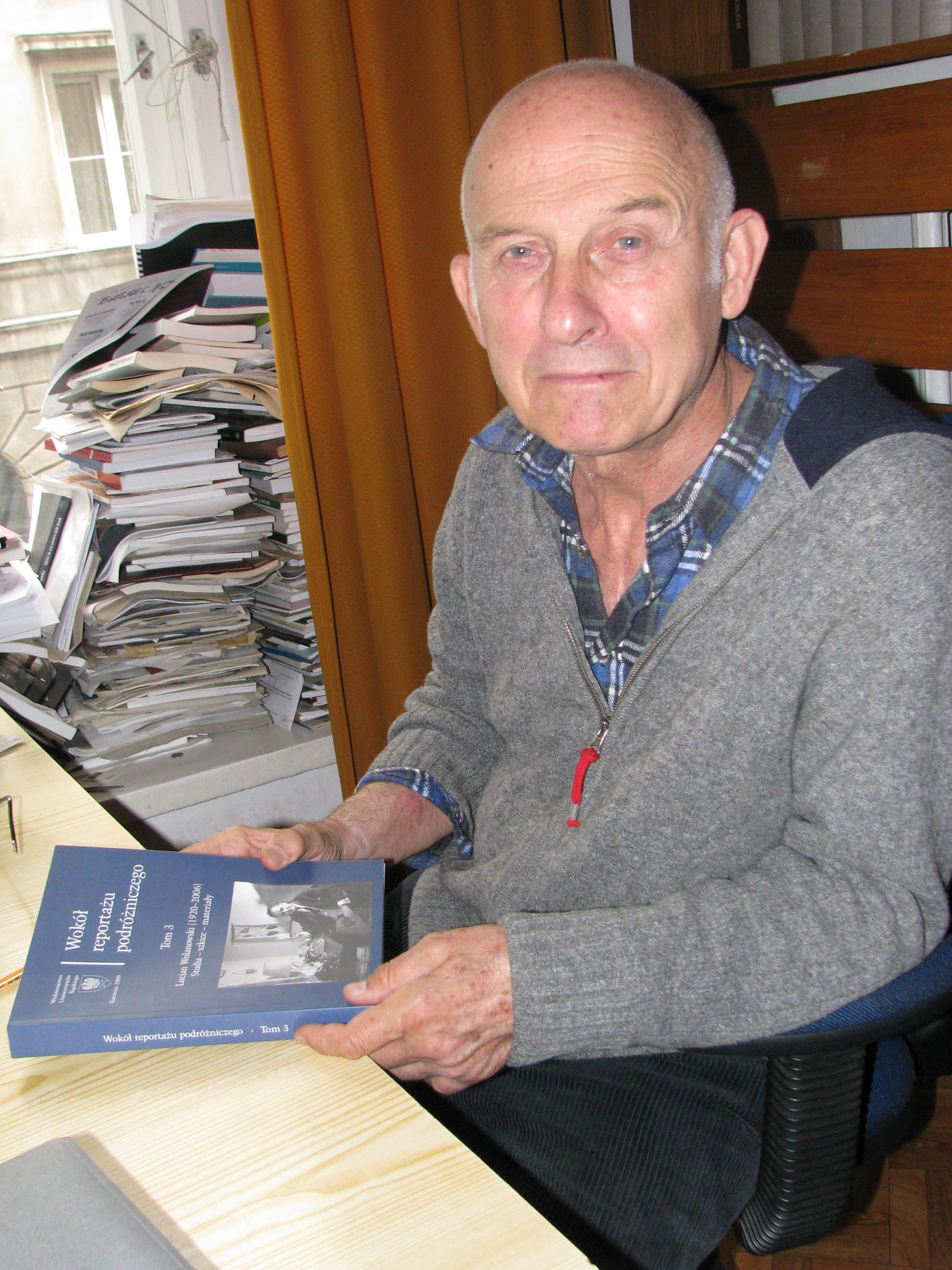
- Łubieński in 2009
- Born: Tomasz Konstanty Łubieński; 18 April 1938; Warsaw, Poland
- Died: 15 March 2024 (aged 85)
- Education: University of Warsaw
- Occupations: Journalist; Writer

Tomasz Konstanty Łubieński (18 April 1938 – 15 March 2024) was a Polish journalist and writer.

Łubieński served as editor-in-chief of Nowe Książki. He also worked for Kultura, Teatr, Tygodnik Solidarność, and TVP1. He was a member of the Polish Writers' Union, the Polish Writers Association, the Association "Polish Community", the Klub Wysokogórski, and PEN International.

Łubieński was the recipient of the Władysław Reymont Literary Award in 2005 and was named a Commander of the Order of Polonia Restituta in 2006.

== Works ==
=== Essays ===
- Bić się czy nie bić? (1976)
- Czerwono-białe
- Norwid wraca do Paryża (1989)
- M jak Mickiewicz (1998)
- Pod skórą
- Ani triumf, ani zgon (2004)

=== Plays ===
- Koczowisko (1979)
- Śmierć Komandora
- Wszystko w rodzinie (2004)
