= OCW =

OCW may refer to:

- OpenCourseWare, university material that is available for all to see and use
- OCW, The Dutch ministry of Education, Culture and Science
- OCW, abbreviation of The Oxford Companion to Wine
- OCW, abbreviation of Oklahoma College for Women
- One cool word, a Vancouver-based arts magazine
- Operation Car Wash, an international bribery scandal that began in Brazil in 2014
