= J. L. Torres =

Puerto Rican fiction writer (born 1954)

- Born: December 1954 (age 71); Cayey, Puerto Rico
- Education: Vassar College (AB); Columbia University (MFA); University of Southern California (MA, PhD)
- Occupations: Author, poet, scholar
- Writing career
- Notable works: The Accidental Native; The Family Terrorist and Other Stories
- Website: jltorreswriter.com

Jose Luis Torres-Padilla (born December 1954), also known by his pen name J. L. Torres, is a Puerto Rican and American fiction writer, poet, literary scholar, critic and editor. He was born in Cayey, Puerto Rico and grew up in the South Bronx. His work focuses on diasporic Puerto Rican literature and culture. He is married and has two sons.

== Biography ==
Torres received an A.B. from Vassar College, where he majored in Hispanic studies and psychology. He went on to receive an M.F.A. in creative writing from Columbia University, and an M.A. and Ph.D. from the University of Southern California in 1994, where he wrote a dissertation on critical essays of the Chicano Renaissance.

Early in his career, Torres served as the managing editor of Latin N.Y. Magazine. He also worked as a freelance writer for Nuestro, the first nationally published, monthly, general-interest magazine, in English, for and about Latinos in the United States. After receiving his M.F.A, he moved to Puerto Rico to teach at the University of Puerto Rico at Cayey. While there, Torres had his first story, "Kerchiefs on a Fence," published by Chiricu Journal in 1984. In 2000, he started a position in the Department of English at the State University of New York at Plattsburgh, where he taught and co-founded and edited the Saranac Review. He retired in 2021.

To date, Torres has published two short story collections, a novel and a poetry collection, besides numerous stories and poems in journals such as the North American Review, Puerto del Sol, Crab Orchard Review, Denver Quarterly, and the Doctor T.J. Eckleburg Review. In 1993, his story, "My Father's Flag," was selected by editors Harold Augenbraum and Ilan Stavans for inclusion in Growing Up Latino, published by Houghton-Mifflin.

Torres's work focuses on the diasporican experience, living in the in-betweeness that forms and informs the Puerto Rican experience in the United States and Puerto Rico. In a review of his novel The Accidental Native, Shakti Castro writes that "Rennie Falto is a Puerto Rican character for the new millennium… The Accidental Native represents a new phase of Puerto Rican literature, giving us a character that rebels against the usual and challenges what it means to be Puerto Rican, and the proscribed ways in which to be a Latino." This perspective underlines what Torres calls "writing from the post-barrio universe," signaling a redefinition and re-configuration of the term "Nuyorican."

The Accidental Native marks the first novel written in English dealing with the Nuyorican reverse migration to Puerto Rico. Claudio Iván Remeseira of NBCLatino recommended it as one of “5 great reads by Latino and Caribbean authors” for 2013. In her review of the novel, Donna Chavez writes that "Torres does capture the conflicts and challenges Puerto Ricans experience when returning to their homeland, but he reaches beyond the specific to the universal, illuminating the lives and feelings of any second-generation American in a similar situation." In her essay on The Accidental Native, Consuelo Martinez Reyes argues for a "decolonial interpretation of J.L. Torres's work" that "proposes a familial configuration in which affective forces originating from female characters function as a tool of epistemic liberation against imperialist colonizing."

In 2008, Arte Público Press published Torres's first collection of short fiction, The Family Terrorist and Other Stories. In his review for the Multicultural Review, Aaron Michael Morales wrote of the collection: "Sexy, provocative, brave even, Torres gives plenty of space in ten of his eleven stories…for an exploration of how men construct their identities in relation to the men with whom they interact." The author and scholar Manuel Muñoz included the collection in his review essay "Crossing Territories: New Spaces in Six Works of Fiction," published in the journal Western American Literature in 2011.

Torres's collection of poetry Boricua Passport was published by 2Leaf Press in 2014. Reviewer Marilyn McCabe wrote that "[Torres's] poems explore his Bronx boyhood with its mix of gritty urban reality and the richness of the Puerto Rican culture of his neighborhood...He also explores the Puerto Rico of today, both its complexities and his attachment to and alienation from the very place that he is supposed to consider 'home.'"

As a literary scholar and critic, Torres has contributed essays and reviews to the study of multi-ethnic literature, particularly Latino literature and the literature of the Puerto Rican Diaspora. He co-edited with Carmen Haydee Rivera, a critical anthology of the literature of the Puerto Rican diaspora, Writing Off the Hyphen: New Perspectives on the Literature of the Puerto Rican Diaspora, which was published in 2008. The Puerto Rican scholar Frances Aparicio, in her review of the book, wrote that "There is no other literary anthology that is timely, up to date, and that brings together such a wide array of topics and approaches that do justice to the complexities of U.S. Puerto Rican literature."

In 2011, Torres was awarded a Fulbright to teach US multiethnic literature at the University of Barcelona and the Autonomous University of Barcelona.

In 2020, Torres's second collection of short stories, Migrations, won the Inaugural Tomas Rivera Book Prize, sponsored by the University of California, Riverside, and the Los Angeles Review of Books and judged by Luis Alberto Urrea.

In 2023, Torres was included in the collection Diasporic Journeys: Interviews with Puerto Rican Writers in the United States, which was published by Centro Press.

At SUNY Plattsburgh, Torres taught courses on American literature, U.S. Latino/a and ethnic literatures, creative writing, rhetoric and composition, and literary theory. His scholarship includes articles on Piri Thomas, Juan Flores, and Giannina Braschi.

== Publications ==
- Migrations. LARB Libros, 2021. Inaugural Winner of the Tomás Rivera Book Prize. ISBN 1940660742
- Boricua Passport: Poems. 2Leaf Press, 2014. ISBN 1940939194
- The Accidental Native: A Novel. Arte Público Press, 2013. ISBN 155885777X
- The Family Terrorist and Other Stories. Arte Público Press, 2008. ISBN 9781558855274
- Writing Off the Hyphen: New Perspectives on the Literature of the Puerto Rican Diaspora. Co-Edited with Carmen Haydee Rivera, U. of Washington Press, 2008. ISBN 9780295988245

== Awards and honors ==
- Fulbright Senior Scholar, Barcelona, Spain, 2011.
- CCCC Scholars for the Dream Award.
- Grant from Recovering the US Hispanic Literary Heritage Project.

== See also ==
- List of Puerto Ricans
- List of Puerto Rican writers
- Puerto Rican literature
- Puerto Ricans in the United States
