= Timber Creek Review =

American literary magazine

The Timber Creek Review (TCR) is a literary journal, founded in 1994, and based in Greensboro, North Carolina. The journal's editor is John M. Freiermuth.

TCR published short story, literary nonfiction and poetry. Work that appeared in the Timber Creek Review has been short-listed for New Stories from the South. Writer's Digest named it the best new literary magazine.

Among the established writers whose careers the TCR helped launch are Corey Mesler, Ron Cooper, Jacob Appel, Pamela Hughes, Brady Allen, Daniel Brugioni, Marion Hodge, and Marie Manilla.

== See also ==
- List of literary magazines
