= Natural Bridge =

Natural bridge(s) or Natural Bridge(s) may refer to:

- Natural arch, a land formation sometimes referred to as a natural bridge

== Places ==
=== Australia ===
- Natural Bridge, Queensland, in the Gold Coast hinterland

=== United States ===
- Natural Bridge, Alabama
- Natural Bridge, New York
- Natural Bridge, Virginia
- Natural Bridge (Virginia), a National Historic Landmark
- Natural Bridge Caverns, in Texas
- Natural Bridge State Park (Massachusetts)
- Natural Bridge State Park (Virginia)
- Natural Bridge State Park (Wisconsin)
- Natural Bridge State Resort Park, in Kentucky
- Natural Bridges National Monument, in Utah
- Natural Bridges State Beach, in Santa Cruz, California
- Battle of Natural Bridge, an American Civil War battle in Florida
- Sewanee Natural Bridge, Tennessee

== Other uses ==
- Natural Bridge (album), by Béla Fleck, 1982
- The Natural Bridge, an album by Silver Jews, 1996
- Natural Bridge (magazine), a literary magazine based at the University of Missouri-St. Louis
