= Red Lightbulbs =

Online literary magazine

- Editor: Sara Woods and Meghan Lamb
- Categories: fiction, poetry, video, audio, visual art
- First issue: April 2011
- Country: USA
- Based in: Chicago, Illinois
- Language: English
- Website: www.redlightbulbs.net

Red Lightbulbs is an online literary magazine that was founded in April 2011. Based in Chicago, Illinois, the magazine publishes fiction, poetry, video art, audio works, and visual art. Subgenres include "Cross-genre, Experimental, Feminist, Flash Fiction, Graphic/Illustrated, Humor, LGBT, Literary Fiction, Micro-poetry, Narrative Nonfiction, Pop Culture, Prose Poetry, Translation."

Contributors have included Nick Sturm, Corey Mesler, Robert Vaughan, Dennis Cooper, Eileen Myles, Blake Butler, Ken Baumann, and featured art by Anders Nilsen. Contributor Jess Dutschmann's piece in Red Lightbulbs was awarded 2011 Best of the Net by Sundress Publications and a short story by Rebekah Matthews was listed on Wigleaf's Top 50 (Very) Short Fictions of 2012.

In describing their publication, the editors have stated, "We are interested in pieces that evoke, but don't explain, reveal, but don't represent. We seek pieces that embody an experience through flickers, fragments, and failed recollections."

A print arm of the magazine, Love Symbol Press, was founded in January 2012. Their first book, M Kitchell's Variations on the Sun, was released on July 15, 2012. Other releases included Why God Why by Matt Rowan and Starfish Over Oyster by Heather Palmer.

== See also ==
- List of literary magazines
