= Bokvennen litterært magasin =

Norwegian literary magazine

- Editor: Gabriel Michael Vosgraff Moro (2010-present)
- Former editors: Jan M. Claussen (1989-2004); Gunnar R. Totland og Elisabeth Skjervum Hole (2005-2009)
- Categories: Literature, Books, Fiction
- Frequency: 4 per year
- Circulation: 4500
- Publisher: Bokvennen Forlag
- Founded: 1989
- Country: Norway
- Based in: Oslo
- Language: Norwegian
- Website: www.blm.no
- ISSN: 0802-1953

Bokvennen litterært magasin is a Norwegian literary magazine, established in 1989 by Jan M. Claussen. The magazine is based in Oslo.

The magazine publishes articles, essays, poetry and short fiction from both Norwegian and international writers. Four paper editions are issued annually. Bokvennen was in 2011 awarded the Magazine of the Year Award in Norway and also honored as the best cultural magazine in the Nordic countries at the Copenhagen book fair Bogforum. The Norwegian Broadcasting Corporation named Bokvennen Norway's best literary magazine in 2010. Many contemporary authors have been interviewed or presented in Bokvennen, among others Elfriede Jelinek, Dave Eggers, Mircea Cărtărescu, Benjamin Kunkel, Péter Nádas, Jean Echenoz, Michael Cera, Junot Díaz, J. M. Coetzee, Joyce Carol Oates, Miranda July, Nam Le, Alberto Manguel, Nadine Gordimer, Gary Snyder, Michael Chabon, Uwe Tellkamp, Sara Stridsberg, Linn Ullmann, Jon Fosse, Jo Nesbø, Johan Harstad and Karl Ove Knausgård. The editor-in-chief from 2010 to 2014 was literary critic Gabriel Vosgraff Moro. The editor-in-chief from 2015 is journalist and writer Alberte Bremberg. Editorial board: Lene Ask, Mari Nymoen Nilsen, Thea Marie Dolva, Tina Åmodt. Bokvennen is supported by the Cultural Council of Norway and the foundation Fritt Ord.

== See also ==
- List of literary magazines
