= Apalachee Review =

- Discipline: Literary journal
- Language: English
- Edited by: Michael Trammell

Publication details
- History: 1971 to present
- Publisher: Apalachee Press (USA)
- Frequency: Bi-annual

Standard abbreviations
- ISO 4: Apalachee Rev.

Indexing
- ISSN: 0890-6408

Links
- Journal homepage

Apalachee Review is an American literary journal based in Tallahassee, Florida. The journal, originally the Apalachee Quarterly, was founded in 1971 by David Morrill, Sandy Shartzer, Kim Rogers and Bill Hampton, former editors of the Florida State University student newspaper, The Florida Flambeau, and the campus literary magazine, The Legend. Stories and poems from the journal have been included in the Pushcart Prize series.

Notable contributors include Marlin Barton, Jacob Appel, Joe Clark, Christine Hale, Kristine Somerville, Tommy Zurhellen, Joanna Leake, Fran Kaplan, Jesse Murphree, Phillip Gardner, Pamela Garvey, PV LeForge, Len Schweitzer, David Kirby, Annie Dillard, Thomas Morrill and Ginnah Howard.

AR is a member of the Council of Literary Magazines and Presses (CLMP) and The Academy of American Poets and participates in the Pushcart Prizes, the O. Henry Awards, Best American Short Stories, Best American Essays, Yearbook of American Poetry, and New Stories of the South (Algonquin Press).

Publication of this magazine was made possible in part by a grant from Leon County and the Leon County Council on Culture & Arts.

Its editor is Michael Trammell, a poet and research associate at Florida State University.

Its fiction editor is Mary Jane Ryals, the 2008 Poet Laureate of the Big Bend of Florida, author of "Cookie & Me" (Kitsune Books) and a research associate at FSU.

Its nonfiction editor is Kathleen Laufenberg, journalist and science writer at the National High Magnetic Field Laboratory.

Its poetry editor is Dominika Wrozynski.

== See also ==
- List of literary magazines
