= Stuck in the Library =

American literary magazine

Stuck in the Library was Brooklyn College's arts and literary magazine. Published quarterly, the magazine features the writings and artwork of Brooklyn College students and others in the community. The magazine is available free of charge at locations on the Brooklyn College campus.

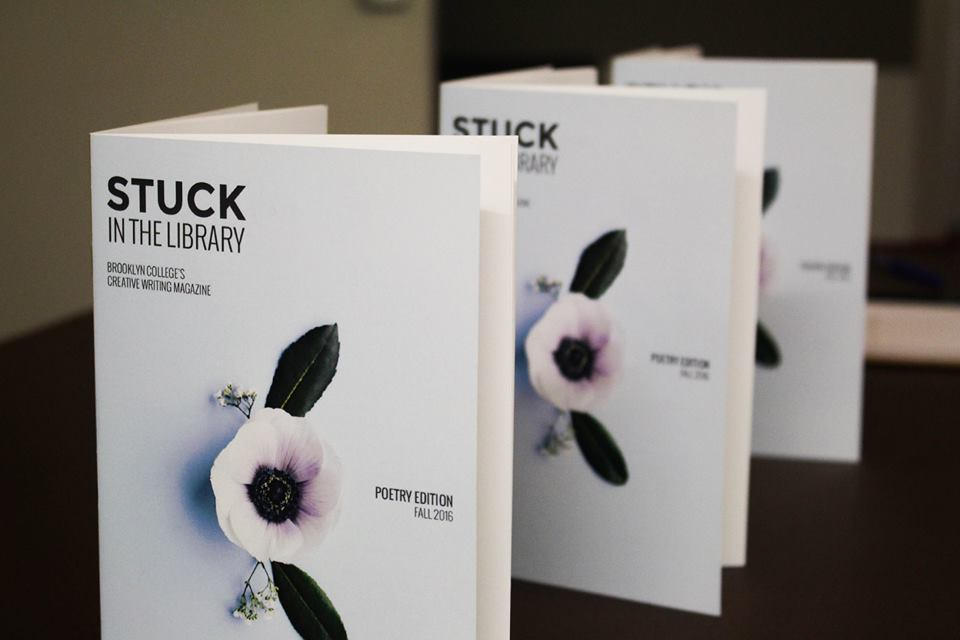
A recent copy of a Stuck in the Library magazine at a publication event on Brooklyn College campus.

== Leadership ==
Founded in March 2013 by Yaakov Bressler, the literary group had a modest beginning, consisting of a dozen or so writers meeting every month for literary and writing events. As the magazine's readers and contributors grew, the magazine took initiative to expand its funding, running a successful referendum campaign in April 2014 – expanding the magazine's budget "from hundreds to thousands."

In 2015, Paulette Gindi became Stuck in the Library's second president, dedicating her term to providing "A Safe and Creative Space at Brooklyn College." The group under Ms. Gindi's leadership succeeding in publishing the magazine's 30th edition in October 2017.

In 2018, Mary Halabani became Stuck in the Library's third president and succeeded in further expanding the literary group's operations to Brooklyn College and CUNY students.

== Mission ==
According to their website:

Stuck in the Library aims to facilitate a space where creativity can flourish by creating a magazine which publishes often and encourages its enthusiasts to meet its contributors, resulting in a thriving literary sphere in Brooklyn College.

== See also ==
- List of literary magazines
