= The Quiet Feather =

British literary magazine

The Quiet Feather was a not-for-profit magazine that served as a showcase for new writing, illustration, photography and poetry. There were nine issues in all, published at somewhat irregular intervals between December 2003 and July 2007. The magazine featured short stories, poetry, travel writing, cartoon strips, lyrics and interviews with writers and musicians. The magazine is published in Cumbria, England, but included work from a worldwide network of contributors and subscribers. Back issues remain available through the magazine's website.

== See also ==
- List of literary magazines
