= Grub Street (literary magazine) =

American literary magazine

Grub Street is Towson University's arts and literary magazine. Published yearly, the magazine features the writings and artwork of Towson students and others in the community. The magazine is nationally recognized and has won many awards given by the Columbia Press Association. It is available free of charge at locations on the Towson University campus.

The cover to the 2005 edition of "Grub Street".

== History and profile ==
Grub Street was founded in 1952. The magazine is named after "Grub Street", a former street in London's impoverished Moorfields district. In the 18th and 19th centuries, the street was famous for its concentration of mediocre, impoverished 'hack writers', aspiring poets, and low-end publishers and booksellers, who existed on the margins of the journalistic and literary scene. Grub Street's bohemian, impoverished literary scene was set amidst the poor neighborhood's low-rent flophouses, brothels, and coffeehouses.

The popular horror novelist Ronald Malfi had published some of his early stories in Grub Street while attending Towson University.

== Mission ==
According to their website:

Sometimes, in an effort to bring those qualities of life--fun, creativity, humor--that are the most subjective to a medium as ambiguous as art, we cross lines. We invade "safe" zones with visual and literary symbols, step outside of preconceived notions, and enter the gray area that is home to all expression. In that gray lies the chance of miscommunication. We, in our art, as in life, take risks. Doing so requires leaving your "safe" zones open, dispelling our preconceived notions, and immersing ourselves in gray. All eyes do not see the same picture, receive the same message, or perceive the same intent.

== See also ==
- List of literary magazines
