= Wilderness House Literary Review =

American literary magazine

- Editor: Steve Glines
- Categories: Literature
- Frequency: Quarterly
- Founded: 2006; 19 years ago
- Website: Official website

The Wilderness House Literary Review is an American quarterly online literary magazine, based in Littleton, Massachusetts. The magazine was launched in 2006. It has published authors such as DeWitt Henry – a founding editor of Ploughshares – A. D. Winans, Lyn Lifshin, Mitchell Waldman, and Hugh Fox – one of the founding members of the Pushcart Prize and the first writer to publish a critical study on the work of Charles Bukowski.

An interview with Robert Whiting, author of Tokyo Underworld, appeared in the autumn 2012 edition.

Steve Glines publishes and edits the magazine.

== See also ==
- List of literary magazines
- List of United States magazines
