= Textsound (journal) =

Online audio literary magazine

- Experimental soundworks
- Editors: Adam Fagin, Anna Vitale, and Laura Wetherington
- Categories: Experimental music, sound poetry, noise, experimental poetry
- Frequency: Monthly
- First issue: February 2008
- Country: United States
- Website: www.textsound.org

Textsound (stylised as textsound) is an audio online literary magazine that publishes experimental poetry and sound.

== History ==
In 2008 textsound began as a bi-annual publication under the editorial direction of Anya Cobler, Adam Fagin, Anna Vitale, and Laura Wetherington.

== Selected contributors ==
- Jaap Blonk
- Anne-James Chaton
- Paul DeMarinis
- Linh Dinh
- Kenneth Goldsmith
- Rick Moody
- Thylias Moss
- Alice Notley
- Alva Noto
- Leslie Scalapino
- Anne Tardos
- Edwin Torres
- Anne Waldman

== Events ==
On April 5, 2008, the textsound editorial collective organized a celebration in Ypsilanti, Michigan, for the journal's launch featuring Barrett Watten, Joel Levise, Christine Hume, James Marks, and Viki.

In the fall of 2008, the textsound collective teamed-up with Megan Levad and Adam Boehmer to curate the Work-In-Progress Reading Series at the Crazy Wisdom Bookstore in Ann Arbor, Michigan. Performers included Vievee Francis, Jill Darling, Onna Solomon, Sandy Tolbert, Aaron McCollough, Adam Boehmer, Michael Shilling, David Karczynski, T Hetzel, Katie Hartsock, Meghann Rotary, Anna Prushnikaya, and Stephanie Rowden.

== See also ==
- List of literary magazines
