= Contrary Magazine =

Literary magazine

- Editors: Jeff McMahon, Shaindel Beers, Frances Badgett
- Categories: Literary journal, culture, literature
- Frequency: quarterly
- First issue: September 21, 2003
- Country: United States
- Based in: Chicago
- Language: English
- Website: contrarymagazine.com
- ISSN: 1549-7038

Contrary Magazine is a quarterly literary journal that publishes commentary, fiction and poetry, and that specializes in work "that combines the virtues of those categories." Founded at the University of Chicago as the Journal of Unpopular Discontent, Contrary began operating independently on the South Side of Chicago in 2003. It features new voices beside established writers, and has published such writers as Ben Maddow, Sherman Alexie, Literary Review founder Walter Cummins, the columnist Heywood Broun and the literary fiction writer Andrew Coburn.

== Reviews ==
In 2007, Contrary began publishing up to a dozen book reviews each quarter, with reviewers who specialize in contemporary fiction and poetry, emerging poets in Ireland, nature writing, art and art museums, literary culture, and memoir.

== See also ==
- List of literary magazines
