= The Write Place At the Write Time =

Literary magazine

The Write Place At the Write Time is an online triannual literary magazine that publishes fiction, non-fiction, poetry, and interviews. It was first published in 2008 and is listed on websites such as Poets & Writers.

The magazine has published interviews with people such as Janet Fitch, author of White Oleander, Alice Hoffman, author of Practical Magic and The Story Sisters, Gerald Dawe, Director of the Oscar Wilde Centre and Senior Lecturer at Trinity College, Dublin, the singer/composer Loreena McKennitt, Arthur Golden, author of Memoirs of a Geisha, Dennis Lehane, author of Mystic River and Shutter Island, Frances Mayes, author of Under the Tuscan Sun: At Home in Italy, Kathleen Flinn, author of The Sharper Your Knife, the Less You Cry, and Joanne Harris, author of Chocolat.

Those who have been featured in its pages have been published in periodicals such as The New York Times, Newsweek and Business Week.

The Editor in Chief is Nicole M. Bouchard, who has interviewed several people of note in the artistic and literary community.

== See also ==
- List of literary magazines
