= Third Coast (magazine) =

American literary magazine

- Editor-in-chief: Emily Stinson
- Categories: Literary magazine
- Frequency: Biannual
- Publisher: Western Michigan University
- Founded: 1995
- Country: United States
- Based in: Kalamazoo, Michigan
- Language: English
- Website: www.thirdcoastmagazine.com
- ISSN: 1520-8206
- OCLC: 34255959

Third Coast is an American literary magazine published at Western Michigan University. It was established in 1995 by graduate students in the university's English department. Since September 2017, the editor-in-chief is Ariel Berry and the managing editor is Cody Greene.

Work that has appeared in Third Coast has received the O. Henry Award, and the Pushcart Prize and has been reprinted in Best of the West: New Stories from the Wide Side of the Missouri and The Best American Poetry. The magazine also awards annual prizes in fiction and poetry.

== See also ==
- List of literary magazines
