= WALL Literary Journal =

- Discipline: Literary journal
- Language: English
- Edited by: Noah East

Publication details
- History: 2001–present
- Publisher: Saddleback College (United States)
- Frequency: Annually

Standard abbreviations
- ISO 4: WALL Lit. J.

Indexing
- OCLC no.: 871347196

Links
- Journal homepage

Wall Literary Journal is an annually published literary magazine founded in 2001 featuring selected works from Saddleback College students. It publishes short stories, poetry, personal narratives, photography, and artwork. A printed copy of the journal circulates on campus at the start of Saddleback's Fall Semester. Unlike many other college and university literary journals, WALL only accepts submissions from students currently enrolled at Saddleback College. Staff members consist of Saddleback College students and are responsible for reviewing and selecting student submissions, layout and design, proofing, copy editing, and publicity.

== Awards and acclaim ==
2017 American Scholastic Press Association Most Outstanding Community College Literary-Art Magazine First Place with Special Merit Magazine Award

2016 American Scholastic Press Association 1st Place with Special Merit Magazine Award

Community College Humanities Association 2nd Place, Best Magazine Award, Pacific-Western Region

2015 American Scholastic Press Association 1st Place, Magazine Award: WALL Literary Journal

Community College Humanities Association Pacific-Western Region Division 3rd Place, Creative Nonfiction: Jilly Pretzel, “Chicken” 2nd Place, Artwork: Anibal Santos, "El Nahual"

2014 Community College Humanities Association

- Pacific-Western Division Literary Competition (sponsored by the Community College Humanities Association)
  - Second Place awarded to "Experimentation" by Sterling Arthur Leva
  - Second Place awarded to "Good Habits" by Ellen Rose

2013

- American Scholastic Press Association
  - First Place among campus literary magazines

2012

- American Scholastic Press Association
  - First Place among campus literary magazines

“One of the Best New Literary Magazines in the nation” – The Community College Humanities Association, 2001

Cover of WALL's award-winning 2012 edition

== Masthead ==
The WALL staff is broken down into five committees: Short Story, Poetry, Essay, Art, and Publicity. Each committee, excluding Publicity, is headed by an editor. All staff members are managed by the Editor-in-Chief and Faculty Advisor (a professor at Saddleback College).

- Charles (Harry) H.M. Foster Editor-in-Chief (2019)
- Brooke Campbell - Editor-in-Chief (2017)
- Karen Renee Bailey - Editor-in-Chief (2016)
- Matthew Durham - Editor-in-Chief (2015)
- Sterling Arthur Leva - Editor-in-Chief (2014)
- Alexander Kusztyk – Editor-in-Chief (2013)
- Denise Blike – Editor-in-Chief (2012)
- Jaclyn Fauls – Editor-in-Chief (2011)
- Erik Adams – Editor-in-Chief (2010)
- Gina Shaffer – Current Faculty Advisor
- Amy Sterling Casil – Former Faculty Advisor
- Suki Fisher – Former Faculty Advisor
- Josh Pryor - Former Faculty Advisor

== See also ==
- List of literary magazines
