= Lake Effect (journal) =

- Discipline: Literary journal
- Language: English
- Edited by: George Looney

Publication details
- History: 1996 - present
- Publisher: Penn State Erie, The Behrend College (United States)
- Frequency: Annual

Standard abbreviations
- ISO 4: Lake Eff.

Indexing
- ISSN: 1538-3105

Links
- Journal homepage

Lake Effect is a literary journal based at the Erie campus of Penn State University. It was first published in 1996. In Spring 2022, the 26th volume of the journal was released.

== Editors ==
The current editors are George Looney (editor-in-chief) and Aimee Pogson (fiction).

It is notable among University-sponsored literary journals in that its editorial staff are undergraduate students. Most other University-sponsored literary journals have MFA students who are involved in the editorial work.

== Contributors ==
Recent noteworthy contributors include: Steve Almond, Jacob M. Appel, T. R. Hummer, Michael Martone, Chris Mazza, Esther Pearlman and Virgil Suarez.

== Other Awards ==
Stories that have previously appeared in Lake Effect have been anthologized in the Best American Short Stories. [citation and title / author needed]

== See also ==
- List of literary magazines
