= Bodega Magazine =

Online literary magazine

Bodega Magazine is an online literary magazine that releases new issues on the first Monday of every month, featuring stories, poems, essays and interviews from a mix of emerging and established writers. It was founded in early spring of 2012 by creative writing MFA graduates from New York University who had previously worked together on the Washington Square Review, and continues to be based out of Manhattan and Brooklyn. The inaugural issue was published on September 4, 2012.

The magazine's name comes from the Spanish term for a corner store which offers everyday grocery items and is commonly found all over New York City. The magazine's tagline defines itself as "your literary corner store." Bodega's logo is a chicken timer to match the magazine's mission of curating issues which can be read start to finish in one sitting. In November 2013 Bodega became a member of Fractured Atlas.

== See also ==
- List of literary magazines
