= PEN America (journal) =

- Discipline: Literary journal
- Language: English
- Edited by: M. Mark

Publication details
- History: 2000–present
- Publisher: PEN America (United States)
- Frequency: Annual

Standard abbreviations
- ISO 4: PEN Am.

Indexing
- ISSN: 1536-0261
- OCLC no.: 47348611

Links
- Journal homepage

PEN America: A Journal for Writers and Readers is an annual literary journal that features fiction, poetry, conversation, criticism, and memoir. It is published by PEN America in New York City. Contributors include Yousef Al-Mohaimeed, Paul Auster, Michael Cunningham, Lydia Davis, Petina Gappah, Nikki Giovanni, Rawi Hage, Shahriar Mandanipour, Colum McCann, Michael Ondaatje, Marilynne Robinson, Salman Rushdie, Susan Sontag, John Edgar Wideman, and many others.

== History ==
PEN America was established in 2000 by M. Mark, a member of PEN's Board of Trustees at the time. In its inaugural year, PEN America was recognized as one of the "Ten Best New Magazines" by Library Journal. The magazine received a nomination for an Utne Independent Press Award in 2010 for its international coverage. The essay "Ghost Writer" by Cynthia Ozick, which was published in PEN America 9: Checkpoints, was included in The Best American Essays 2009 as part of The Best American Series. Additionally, works of fiction from the magazine were selected for the Pushcart Prize in 2009 and 2010.

In February 2009, Edward Albee, André Aciman, Anthony Appiah, Ron Chernow, Lydia Davis, Deborah Eisenberg, Francine Prose, and Sarah Ruhl participated in the journal's first benefit reading.

== Issues ==
- PEN America 1: Classics
- PEN America 2: Home & Away
- PEN America 3: Tribes
- PEN America 4: Fact/Fiction
- PEN America 5: Silences
- PEN America 6: Metamorphoses
- PEN America 7: World Voices
- PEN America 8: Making Histories
- PEN America 9: Checkpoints
- PEN America 10: Fear Itself
- PEN America 11: Make Believe
- PEN America 12: Correspondences
- PEN America 13: Lovers
- PEN America 14: The Good Books
- PEN America 15: Maps
- PEN America 16: Teachers

== See also ==
- List of literary magazines
