= Talking River Review =

American literary magazine

The Talking River Review is an American literary magazine founded in 1994 based at the Lewis-Clark State College in Lewiston, Idaho. The magazine is published on a biannual basis. Work that has appeared in Talking River Review has been short-listed for the Pushcart Prize.

== Notable contributors ==
- Claire Davis
- Mary Clearman Blew
- William Studebaker
- Kim Barnes
- Robert Wrigley
- Gary Finke
- William Kittredge
- Ronald Wallace
- Paul Zarzyski
- Stephen Dunn
- Jacob M. Appel
- Fred Melton
- Gail Konop Baker
- Anne Caylor MacAlpin

== See also ==
- List of literary magazines
