= The Commonline Journal =

US magazine

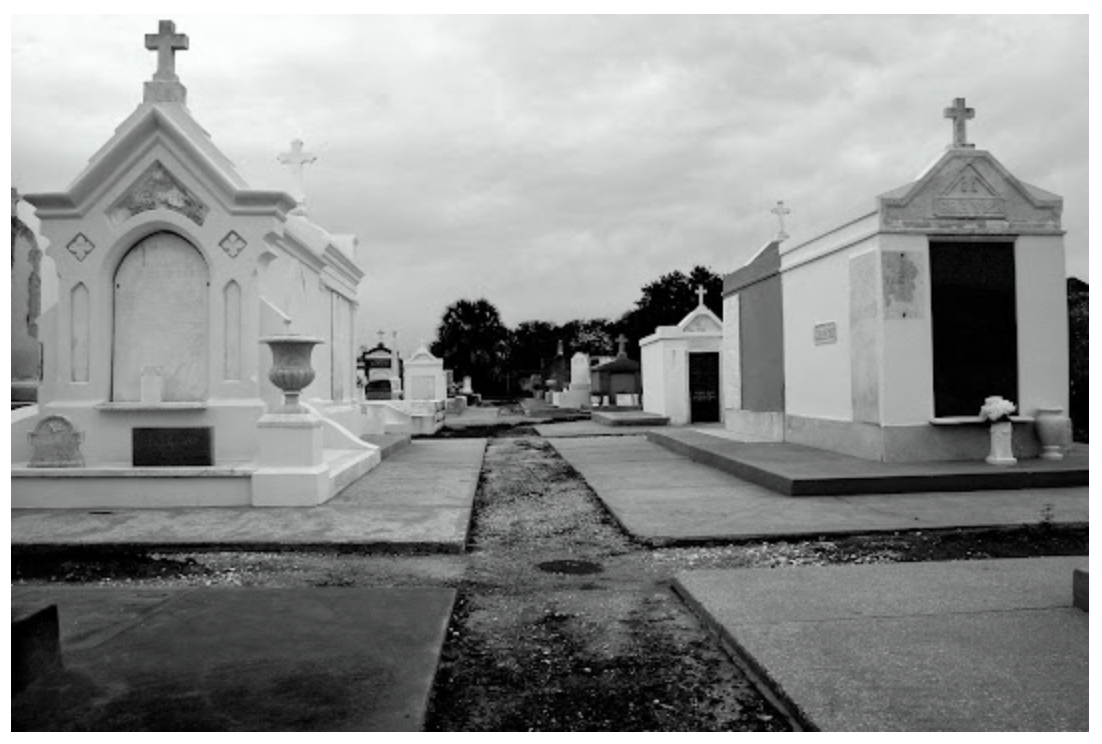
- Journal Cover Art
- Editor: Pikthall
- Former editors: Dennis Paul Wilken, Doug Dramine, Lisa Marie Basile, Richard Wink, Ada Fetters, Rod Tipton, Eli Forrester
- Staff writers: Ben Sutherland
- Photographer: Matt Valentine
- Categories: Literary magazine E-journal
- Frequency: Quarterly / Rolling
- Publisher: Imperative Papers
- First issue: 2007
- Final issue: 2017
- Country: United States / United Kingdom
- Based in: Seattle, WA / Norwich, ENG
- Language: English
- Website: www.thecommonlinejournal.com
- ISSN: 2327-364X

The Commonline Journal is a literary e-journal of accessible poetry and discourse.

The publication was developed in 2007 as an interdisciplinary curriculum in hypertextual literary theory by students in the Culture, Text, and Language unit at The Evergreen State College. The journal established its reputation by publishing realist poetry by authors emerging through Web 2.0 networks and turn-of-the-century online magazines. It published a range of forms and declared a proclivity for “stark narrative free-verse poetry that is visceral and grounded.”

The Commonline Journal featured regular contributions from several Literary Editors including the poets Justin Hyde, Dennis Paul Wilken, Rob Plath, and Luis Cuauhtémoc Berriozábal. Notable contributors to the journal include writers James Robison, Tony O'Neill, Suzanne Buffam, Rebecca Wolff, Ellen Bass, D. M. Aderibigbe, Lyn Lifshin, National Poetry Slam champion Anis Mojgani and Pulitzer Prize winner Stephen Dunn.

The journal published its final issue in 2017.
