= Jabberwock Review =

American literary journal

- Discipline: Literary journal
- Language: English
- Edited by: Becky Hagenston

Publication details
- History: 1980–present
- Publisher: Mississippi State University (United States)
- Frequency: semi-annually

Standard abbreviations
- ISO 4: Jabberwock Rev.

Indexing
- ISSN: 1541-3705

Links
- Journal homepage

The Jabberwock Review is a literary journal founded in 1980 and based at Mississippi State University.

The journal publishes poetry, fiction, nonfiction and art. Recent notable contributors include poets Nicky Beer and Brian Barker and fiction writers Jacob M. Appel and Robert Parham.

== Masthead ==
As of November 2016:

- Editor: Becky Hagenston
- Associate Editor: Ciera Higginbotham

== See also ==
- List of literary magazines
