= Wheelhouse Magazine =

Online magazine

Wheelhouse Magazine is an online progressive arts and politics magazine, run by members of the Wheelhouse Arts Collective.

== History and profile ==
First published in Winter 2007, the magazine is known for its left-leaning politics, its dedication to promoting new writers and artists, and its sponsoring of community projects—such as the New York Suicide Shows, The Evergreen State College Saturday Reading Series, and New York Stories. The magazine also features surrealist work.

== Editors ==
Wheelhouse Magazine is edited by fiction writer and philosophy professor David Michael Wolach, and union organizer Eden Schulz.

== Credits ==
- Authors Recently Published: Nahid Rachlin, Tung Hui-Hu, Jim Ruland, Diane Lefer, Mimi Albert, Jared Carter, Lourdes Vázquez.
- Visual and Multi-media artists exhibited: Daniel Johnston, Tom Carey, Mark Reuthold, David Schulz.
- Essays Recently Published: Steve Heller, Rahul Kumar, Sheyene Foster Heller
- Recent Reading Series Participants: Steve Almond, Tung Hui-Hu, Steve Heller, Jan Baross, Diane Lefer, Leonard Schwartz.

== See also ==
- List of literary magazines
