= Straylight Magazine =

American literary magazine

- Website type: Literature website
- Available in: English
- Owner: Dean Karpowicz
- Creator: Dean Karpowicz
- Website: straylightmag.com
- Launched: Spring 2007
- Current status: Online

Straylight Magazine is the literary magazine of the University of Wisconsin–Parkside, owned and edited by Dean Karpowicz as well as a staff of rotating Parkside students. It features non-genre literary works of fiction, poetry, and art. It also includes book reviews and interviews. The magazine is available in both print and online formats.

== History ==
The magazine was launched in the spring of year 2007. Over the course of time, the magazine has been steadily refined with regards to its content and appearance. For example, the Fall 2008 issue contains its first book reviews. The Spring 2009 issue featured its first colored pictures for the art section, and though cuts in funding have resulted a trimming down of the page count, the colored art is a feature that will remain with the magazine. With the advent of the Fall 2009 issue, interviews will be introduced to the magazine.

== See also ==
- List of literary magazines
