= New Nottingham Journal =

Independent literary magazine based in Nottingham, England

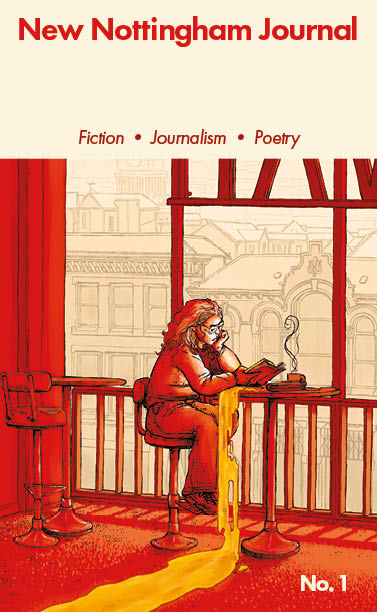
- Cover of New Nottingham Journal, Issue 1 (2025)
- Editor-in-Chief: Andrew Tucker Leavis
- Categories: Literary magazine
- Publisher: Agamemnon
- First issue: 14 November 2025
- Country: United Kingdom
- Based in: Nottingham
- Language: English
- Website: https://newnottinghamjournal.com

The New Nottingham Journal (NNJ) is an independent literary magazine based in Nottingham, England. Founded and edited by Andrew Tucker Leavis, the publication is published by Agamemnon and focuses on contemporary short fiction, essays, poetry and visual art. The first issue is scheduled for release on 14 November 2025.

== History ==
The New Nottingham Journal was founded in 2025 as a print and digital platform for writers and artists around the world, including those connected to Nottingham and the wider Midlands region. The publication emerged from the city’s growing independent literary scene and aligns with Nottingham’s designation as a UNESCO City of Literature.

The inaugural issue, No. 1, featured more than forty pieces of poetry, prose, and photography, presented in a monochrome design. It included pieces by Henry Normal, Alison Moore, Nicholas Hogg, Emma Neale and Indu Menon. A crowdfunding campaign in mid-2025 supported its first print run and distribution across independent bookshops and cultural venues in the East Midlands.

No. 2 is due to release in November 2026, featuring new work from Jo Shapcott, Benjamin Myers, Camilla Grudova, Hamid Ismailov, Dean Atta and a new translation of Sadegh Hedayat.

== Content and themes ==
The magazine publishes contemporary writing of broad genres, which include lyrical realism, satire, mythology and ecology. The form of its content spans poetry, short fiction, and reflective essays alongside monochrome visual art and photography, often exploring themes of a sense of place, femininity and masculinity, and political and civilisational change.

== Production and design ==
Produced by Agamemnon in Nottingham, the NNJ works within a minimalist, black-and-white aesthetic and an emphasis on typographic clarity. Each issue is printed on uncoated stock with type set at a 12-point size to balance readability and style.

== Reception ==
The launch of the New Nottingham Journal has been covered by several cultural organisations and media outlets, including Nottingham UNESCO City of Literature, Nottingham City Libraries, LeftLion magazine, the Notts Review, and Barcelona UNESCO City of Literature. The first issue sold out its initial print run and was reprinted - critics highlighted the publication's focus on emerging regional voices and its contribution to Nottingham's literary identity.

== See also ==
- City of Literature
- The London Magazine
- List of literary magazines
