= The Lakeview Review =

American literary journal

The Lakeview Review was an American literary journal published in the Fingerlakes area of Upstate New York by founding editor Tanya Babcock. The print journal was established in 2008 and was published quarterly: January, April, July and October. The magazine is headquartered in Wayland, New York.

In late 2009, The Lakeview Review ceased publication, but it was decided to resurrect the project as an online literary journal in 2010. The online version is published bi-annually, and accepts submissions for the Review's continuing writing contests. The Lakeview Review also has an online writing community that includes blogs and a book club.

== See also ==
- List of literary magazines
