= Booklist =

American book review magazine

- December 15, 2018 issue
- Categories: Book reviews, book industry, library science
- Frequency: 22 issues per year
- Publisher: American Library Association
- First issue: January 1905
- Country: United States
- Based in: Chicago, Illinois
- Language: English
- Website: www.booklistonline.com
- ISSN: 0006-7385
- OCLC: 1536781

Booklist is a publication of the American Library Association that provides critical reviews of books and audiovisual materials for all ages. Booklist's primary audience consists of libraries, educators, and booksellers. The magazine is available to subscribers in print and online. It is published 22 times per year, and reviews over 7,500 titles annually. The Booklist brand also offers a blog, various newsletters, and monthly webinars. The Booklist offices are located in the American Library Association headquarters in Chicago.

== History ==
Booklist, as an introduction from the American Library Association (ALA) publishing board notes, began publication in January 1905 to "meet an evident need by issuing a current buying list of recent books with brief notes designed to assist librarians in selection".

With an annual subscription fee of 50 cents, Booklist was initially subsidized by a $100,000 grant from the Carnegie Foundation, known for its public and university library endowments, and at first mainly contained 25- to 50-word summaries of recently published books. In 1913, the Booklist offices were moved from Boston to the ALA headquarters in Chicago's McCormick mansion. By the 1930s, its reviews had become more in-depth, and the journal began to include some articles. In October 1939, just a few weeks after the start of World War II, Booklist published an article entitled "Books for the 'Long and Calm View': On the Crisis, Its Background and Implications to the United States", intended to address "the demand for impartial books without the emotionalism of propaganda". Amidst a world crisis, the editor helped library patrons to have their questions answered while presenting various viewpoints. From the 1950s to the 1960s, Booklist reviews were limited to 150 words, generally three long sentences. Reviews were handwritten in pencil on yellow legal paper, edited and typed up for the printer. Artistic design choices for the magazine were minimal, with the only visual change between issues being the plain cover's solid colour.

During the 1970s, as adolescent literature gained popularity, a Young Adult books editor was hired. The publication of such books as Judy Blume's Forever, Phyllis Reynolds Naylor's Alice series, and S.E. Hinton's The Outsiders marked a need to evaluate books not meant strictly for either children or adults. In 1973, new editor-publisher Paul Brawley was the first to print editions of the magazine with recreated book jackets on the cover. Under Brawley's editorship, Booklist began to accept submissions and print reviews of audiovisual products, beginning with 16mm film strips and spoken-word recordings. During the 1980s and 1990s, Booklist began its Editors' Choice reviews and its first feature column, "Manley Arts", by Will Manley. The 1990s issues of Booklist were the first to be composed on in-office computers.

The June 2005 issue of Booklist marked the magazine's 100th anniversary. To celebrate the centennial, the acting editors published a feature article entitled "The Booklist Century", wherein they chose a book from each year of the preceding hundred to highlight its social impact — ranging from Edith Wharton's The House of Mirth (1905) to the 9/11 Commission Report.

Currently, the magazine can be found online and in print. The Booklist editorial team also creates supplemental products, such as Book Links, webinars and the Booklist Reader. By 2023, Booklist published 8,000 reviews per year.

== Current masthead ==
- Rachel Hendrick - Publisher
- Donna Seaman - Editor in Chief and Editor, Adult Books
- Sarah Hunter - Editor, Books for Youth
- Susan Maguire - Senior Editor, Collection Management and Library Outreach
- Heather Booth - Editor, Audio

== Reviews and reviewers ==
Booklist Reviews: Reviews include a brief synopsis plus mention of the most successful elements of style. Most reviews fall between 175 and 225 words.

Starred Reviews: The Booklist star indicates an outstanding title of a particular genre. All starred reviews are approved by the appropriate editor.

High-Demand: The "High-Demand Backstory" symbol indicates titles likely to be surrounded by media coverage and patron popularity.

Adult Books with YA Appeal: As an additional source for librarians, Booklist reviews certain adult titles and labels them for YA appeal. These materials tend to have young protagonists or themes relevant to teenage readers.

Booklist Selection Policy: The editors of Booklist magazine adhere to a selection policy consistent with the Library Bill of Rights.

Booklist Reviewers: Titles are reviewed by a corps of librarians, freelancers, journalists, and educators, as well as Booklist editors and staff.

== Sponsored awards ==
Booklist sponsors three main awards: the Michael L. Printz Award for Excellence in Young Adult Literature, the Andrew Carnegie Medals for Excellence in Fiction and Nonfiction, and the Odyssey Award for Excellence in Audiobook Production.

The Printz Award is administered by the Young Adult Library Services Association. The Carnegie Medals are administered by an annually appointed selection committee, including a chair, three Booklist editors or contributors, and three former members of the RUSA CODES Notable Books Council. The Odyssey Award is jointly administered by the Association for Library Service to Children and the Young Adult Library Services Association.

Additionally, Booklist selects Editors' Choice lists for adult books, young adult books, books for youth, adult audiobooks, and audiobooks for youth. The best title in each category is selected to a list known as Top of The List. Editors' Choice and Top of the List titles are announced in December and printed in the subsequent January 1 & 15 double issue of Booklist.

== See also ==
- Book Links
- List of literary magazines
- Books in the United States
