= Flock (literary journal) =

American literary magazine

- Editor: April Gray Wilder
- Categories: Literature, Art
- Frequency: Biannual
- Founded: 2002
- Country: United States
- Based in: Jacksonville, Florida
- Website: Official Website

Flock, founded in 2002, is a biannual literary journal based in Jacksonville, Florida.

== History and mission ==
Flock (formerly Fiction Fix) was founded by University of North Florida students and author, musician, artist, and UNF faculty member Mark Ari in 2002. Its original Editor-in-Chief was Sarah Cotchaleovich, followed by Melissa Milburn, Thelma Young, and current editor-in-chief April Gray Wilder. The journal publishes "accessibly experimental" and "soulful" literature in both traditional and experimental forms. Since its inception the journal has been a part of a growing literary community in North East Florida and has attracted authors from across the United States and world. Between 2009 and 2013 the journal moved entirely online and began showcasing contemporary art. Under the name Fiction Fix, the journal published seventeen fiction issues, one issue of nonfiction, two poetry issues, and two winners of its novella award: "The Sleeping Wall" by Jane Downs and "Homesick Redux" by Daniel Coshnear. In 2016 the journal became Flock with an expanded mission to publish fully multi-genre issues twice a year.

== Awards ==
The journal periodically opens for submissions to its Novella Award, offering publication to the winning submission.

== See also ==
- List of literary magazines
