= Confrontation (journal) =

- Discipline: Literary journal
- Language: English
- Edited by: Jonna G. Semeiks

Publication details
- History: 1968-present
- Publisher: Long Island University (United States)
- Frequency: Biannual

Standard abbreviations
- ISO 4: Confrontation

Indexing
- OCLC no.: 60637997

Links
- Journal homepage

Confrontation is an American literary magazine founded in 1968 and based at Long Island University in Brookville, New York. It publishes fiction, essays and poetry twice each year. The journal, edited from its inception to 2010 by LIU Post English professor and poet Martin Tucker, helped launch the careers of Cynthia Ozick, Paul Theroux and Walter Abish.

Work that has appeared in Confrontation has been short-listed for the Pushcart Prize and The Best American Short Stories.

== Notable contributors ==
- W.H. Auden
- John Steinbeck
- Derek Walcott
- Isaac Bashevis Singer
- Joseph Brodsky
- Nadine Gordimer
- S.Y. Agnon
- Arthur Miller
- Ned Rorem
- Ed Bullins
- Joyce Carol Oates
- T.C. Boyle
- Lanford Wilson
- Richard Burgin
- Dan O'Brien
- Jacob Appel

== See also ==
- List of literary magazines
