= Book Links =

Magazine

November 2018 issue

Book Links is a quarterly magazine published as a supplement to Booklist, both based in Chicago.

== History and profile ==
Book Links was launched in 1990. It began as a magazine published by the American Library Association that helps teachers, librarians, school library media specialists, and parents connect children with high-quality books. Barbara Elleman was the founder of the magazine and edited it during the 1990s. The magazine was published on a monthly basis.

Book Links is now "published as a quarterly print supplement to Booklist, at no additional cost to subscribers, rather than as a stand-alone magazine."

== See also ==
- List of literary magazines
