= Pinball (journal) =

American literary magazine

- Discipline: Literary magazine
- Language: English
- Edited by: Lucas Church

Publication details
- History: 2012 to present
- Publisher: Online (United States)
- Frequency: Quarterly (web)

Standard abbreviations
- ISO 4: Pinball

Indexing
- ISSN: 2168-8699

Links
- Journal homepage

Pinball is an American literary magazine based in Chapel Hill, North Carolina, that publishes fiction, essays, visual art, and comics online.

== History and background ==
Pinball was founded in 2011 by a group of graduate students at North Carolina State University after they noted the lack of a magazine affiliated with the university's MFA program. The first issues premiered in late 2012. Initially funded by the English department and Creative Writing Program at NCSU, Pinball became an independent publication in 2013.

Pinball publishes four online and ebook issues annually with each issue including seven to eight contributors. Each issue contains short stories, original artwork, and at least one comic. The journal, according to the website, seeks to emphasize "the diverse, forward-thinking, and constantly evolving literary landscape," while publishing work that is "both high caliber and accessible—work that speaks not only to other writers and artists, but to the wider community of readers."

== Notable contributors ==
In its short history, Pinball has published several award-winning science-fiction authors, including Kij Johnson, Tony Daniel, and Bruce Holland Rogers, as well as literary writers, including young novelist Miles Klee and NPR contributor David Ellis Dickerson. Notable comic artists include Screaming Females' guitarist and singer Marissa Paternoster. The journal also publishes up and coming writers, visual artists, and comic artists.

== Submissions ==
Pinball reads submissions all year, with occasional breaks. Writers and artists can submit their work through the magazine's web portal. The magazine permits simultaneous submissions. If the story passes a preliminary reading by the editor-in-chief, the story is then assigned to two staff members to read. Each story is read by at least two staff members and then the editor.

== See also ==
- List of literary magazines
