= Adam Sanat =

Turkish literary magazine

Adam Sanat (Turkish: "Adam Art") (ISSN 1300-154X) was a Turkish literary magazine founded in Istanbul by the Adam Publishing house in 1985 and published through mid-2005. The magazine published the works of many prominent Turkish writers and poets. Turkish poet Turgay Fişekçi, one of its editors, subsequently founded the literary publication Sözcükler in 2006.

== See also ==
- List of literary magazines
