= Pen Pusher =

Pen Pusher Magazine
- Editors: Anna Goodall and Felicity Cloake
- Categories: Reviews, short fiction, poetry
- Frequency: Three times a year
- First issue: April 2006
- Final issue: August 2010
- Country: England
- Based in: London
- Language: English
- Website: Pen Pusher magazine
- ISSN: 1755-4888

Pen Pusher was a London-based literary magazine, published three times a year, that featured original short fiction, poetry, reviews, columns, literary facts and curiosities.

== History and profile ==
Founded in January 2006 by Anna Goodall, Felicity Cloake and Hape Mueller, the first issue was published in April 2006. A complete set of issues (1-16) are held at the British Library, St. Pancras, London.

The last issue of Pen Pusher was published in August 2010 and in February 2011 the magazine stated "our continuing lack of a grant or funding of any kind – and an ill-advised lack of interest in the digital world" as the reason.

The magazine's office was in the Mildmay area of London.

The Kaiser Chiefs' front man, Ricky Wilson, designed the magazine's emblem and was rewarded for his pains with the gift of an antique whistle as Pen Pusher's usual gift of thanks—a wheel of cheese—was unsuitable due to his dairy aversion.

Pen Pusher provided a platform for new writing talent and welcomed submissions of reviews, features, short fiction and poetry.

As well as championing new writing, the magazine featured more well-known literary names. Contributors to the magazine include Simon Callow, Hugo Williams, Simon Munnery, Joe Dunthorne, Josie Long and John Hegley.

== See also ==
- List of literary magazines
