= Ancient Paths =

American literary magazine

Ancient Paths is a U.S. literary magazine devoted to the publication of Christian-themed poetry, stories, and artwork. Founded in 1998, it was originally headquartered in the Washington, D.C. metropolitan area. The magazine is now based in Fairfax Station, Virginia. The magazine has published works by Ida Fasel, Donna Farley, Diane Glancy, and Philip Rosenbaum. The magazine was originally published semiannually, but it is now a biennial publication. The editor is Skylar Burris.
