= Parting Gifts (journal) =

Parting Gifts was a biannual literary magazine founded in 1987 and published by March Street Press of Greensboro, North Carolina. The journal occasionally published poetry, and focused on literary short-shorts and other flash fiction. Parting Gifts was among the select group of journals whose stories are eligible for New Stories from the South, an annual anthology. Robert J. Bixby was the editor and publisher of the journal. The magazine ceased publication in 2009.

== See also ==
- List of literary magazines
- flash fiction
