= Nowe Książki =

Polish literary magazine

Nowe Książki (Polish pronunciation: [ˈnɔ.vɛ ˈkɕɔnʂ.ki], meaning New Books in English) is a journal of new publications in Polish. It is a monthly magazine published by the National Library of Poland. The magazine was started in 1949. The headquarters of the monthly is in Warsaw.

== See also ==
- List of literary magazines
