= Prose Studies =

- Discipline: Literature
- Language: English
- Edited by: Clare A. Simmons

Publication details
- Former name(s): Prose Studies 1800-1900
- History: 1977–present
- Publisher: Routledge
- Frequency: Triannually

Standard abbreviations
- ISO 4: Prose Stud.

Indexing
- ISSN: 0144-0357 (print); 1743-9426 (web)
- LCCN: 81649218
- OCLC no.: 59226226

Links
- Journal homepage; Online access; Online archive

Prose Studies: History, Theory, Criticism is a peer-reviewed academic journal that covers research on non-fictional prose from all periods. It covers subjects such as literature, literary history, biography and autobiography, and literary genres. It was established in 1977 as Prose Studies 1800-1900 and obtained its current name in 1980.

== Abstracting and indexing ==
The journal is abstracted and indexed in America: History and Life, British Humanities Index, and the MLA International Bibliography.
