= Emerson Review =

American literary magazine

- Discipline: Literary
- Language: English

Publication details
- Former name: The Scribe
- History: 1953–present
- Publisher: Emerson College (United States)
- Frequency: Annual

Standard abbreviations
- ISO 4: Emerson Rev.

Indexing
- ISSN: 2156-2237
- LCCN: 12006604
- OCLC no.: 9215110

Links
- Journal homepage

The Emerson Review, founded in 1953 as The Scribe, is Emerson College's award-winning and oldest student-run literary magazine. The book is published annually and is released each spring during a Release Event, which is open to the entire literary community of Boston.

The Emerson Review accepts submissions of poetry, fiction, nonfiction (magazine/journalism articles, personal essay, memoir, etc.), song lyrics, stage- and screenplays, and photography/other visual art.

The editors receive thousands of submissions during the reading period and narrow the work down via meetings with undergraduate readers, graduate students, interns, Emerson College faculty and former editorial staff.

The journal has featured work by alumni such as Steven Wright and Henry Winkler.

Many of the editorial staff work in conjunction with the journal Ploughshares. Selected stories are nominated for a Pushcart Prize.

Currently, distribution of The Emerson Review is limited to the Emerson College community, though distribution is being expanded to include bookstores in the Boston area, and a mailing campaign involving Emerson College donors and former Emerson Review editors is being developed.
