= New South (magazine) =

American literary magazine (2007-)

New South (previously known as The GSU Review) is an American print literary magazine published twice a year by Georgia State University. Founded in 2007 by Jamie Iredell and Christopher Bundy, it is affiliated with GSU's Creative Writing program, which also publishes the literary magazine Five Points. Anna Sandy-Elrod is the Editor-in-Chief of the magazine.

As a "Journal of Art & Literature", New South features short fiction, non-fiction, and poetry from established and emerging writers, as well as occasional interviews. The magazine does not have a specific regional or stylistic focus. New South also sponsors an annual contest for poetry and prose.

== See also ==
- List of literary magazines
- New South (descriptive term)
