= The Pinch =

American literary magazine

- Editor-in-chief: Eric Schlich
- Categories: Literary magazine
- Frequency: Biannual
- Founder: William Page
- First issue: 1980
- Company: University of Memphis
- Country: United States
- Website: www.pinchjournal.com
- ISSN: 0732-2968
- OCLC: 20432242

The Pinch is a biannual literary magazine run by graduate students and faculty at the University of Memphis. It publishes fiction, poetry, creative nonfiction, and visual art.

Works previously published in the magazine have been reprinted in the Best American Essays and Best American Nonrequired Reading, and have won a Pushcart Prize.

The magazine was established by William Page in 1980, under the name Memphis State Review. Its name was changed to River City in 1988 and to The Pinch in 2006. The name "The Pinch" comes from Memphis' old Jewish ghetto, as detailed by Memphis writer Steve Stern.

== Awards ==
- Steve Adams' "Touch" was featured in the 2014 Pushcart Prize anthology.
- Lee Sharkey's "8x8" was featured in the 2013 Pushcart Prize anthology.
- Michael Poore's "The Street of the House of the Sun" was reprinted in Best American Nonrequired Reading 2012.
- Michelle Seaton's "How To Work a Locker Room" was reprinted in Best American Nonrequired Reading 2009.
- Ander Monson's "Solipsism" was reprinted in Best American Essays 2008.
- Anis Shivani's "Dubai" was shortlisted for the Pushcart Prize in 2008.

== See also ==
- List of literary magazines
