= The Nebraska Review =

American literary magazine

- Discipline: Literary journal
- Language: English

Publication details
- History: 1972 to 2003
- Publisher: University of Nebraska Omaha (United States)
- Frequency: Quarterly

Standard abbreviations
- ISO 4: Neb. Rev.

Indexing
- ISSN: 8755-514X

The Nebraska Review was a leading American literary magazine, based at the University of Nebraska Omaha in Omaha, Nebraska. The magazine was founded in 1972 by Richard Duggan and published until 2003.

== Notable contributors ==
- John Addiego
- Jacob M. Appel
- Erin Belieu
- Scott Boylston
- Amy Knox Brown
- DeWitt Henry
- Peter Leach
- Arthur Saltzman
- James Smith
- Tom Whalen

== Honors and awards ==
Four stories that appeared in The Nebraska Review were shortlisted for the Pushcart Prize. Other stories that appeared in The Nebraska Review were reprinted in the Best American Short Stories.
