= Saranac Review =

American literary magazine

Saranac Review is a literary magazine, established in 2004 and based at SUNY Plattsburgh, that includes poetry, fiction, and creative nonfiction. It focuses on the relationship between Canadian and American writing. The journal has also featured interviews with writers such as William Giraldi and Reg Lee. The editor in chief, as of September 2010, is J.L. Torres. The Writer named it the "most exciting" new publication of 2004. The Academy of American Poets named Saranac Review the poetry journal of the year in 2009. It currently (with the recent suspension of publication of the Virginia Quarterly Review) has the largest circulation of any literary journal or magazine published by a state university in the United States.

== Notable contributors ==
- Jay Parini
- Julia Alvarez
- Donald Revell
- Jacob Appel
- Wesley Brown
- Frannie Lindsay
- Xu Xi
- Gregory Pardlo

== See also ==
- List of literary magazines
