= The Aroostook Review =

- Website type: Literary Journal
- Available in: English
- Editor: Geraldine Becker
- Website: http://aroostookreview.umfk.maine.edu/
- Registration: ISSN 1932-4324
- Launched: Spring 2006
- Current status: Online

The Aroostook Review is "the online literary journal of the English Program at the University of Maine at Fort Kent." Geraldine Cannon Becker is the editor-in-chief of the literary journal, initiated in 2006. The magazine publishes poetry, fiction, non-fiction, as well as artwork in each annual issue. The journal has not been published since 2011.

== See also ==
- List of literary magazines
