= Taco Bell Quarterly =

Literary magazine inspired by popular culture

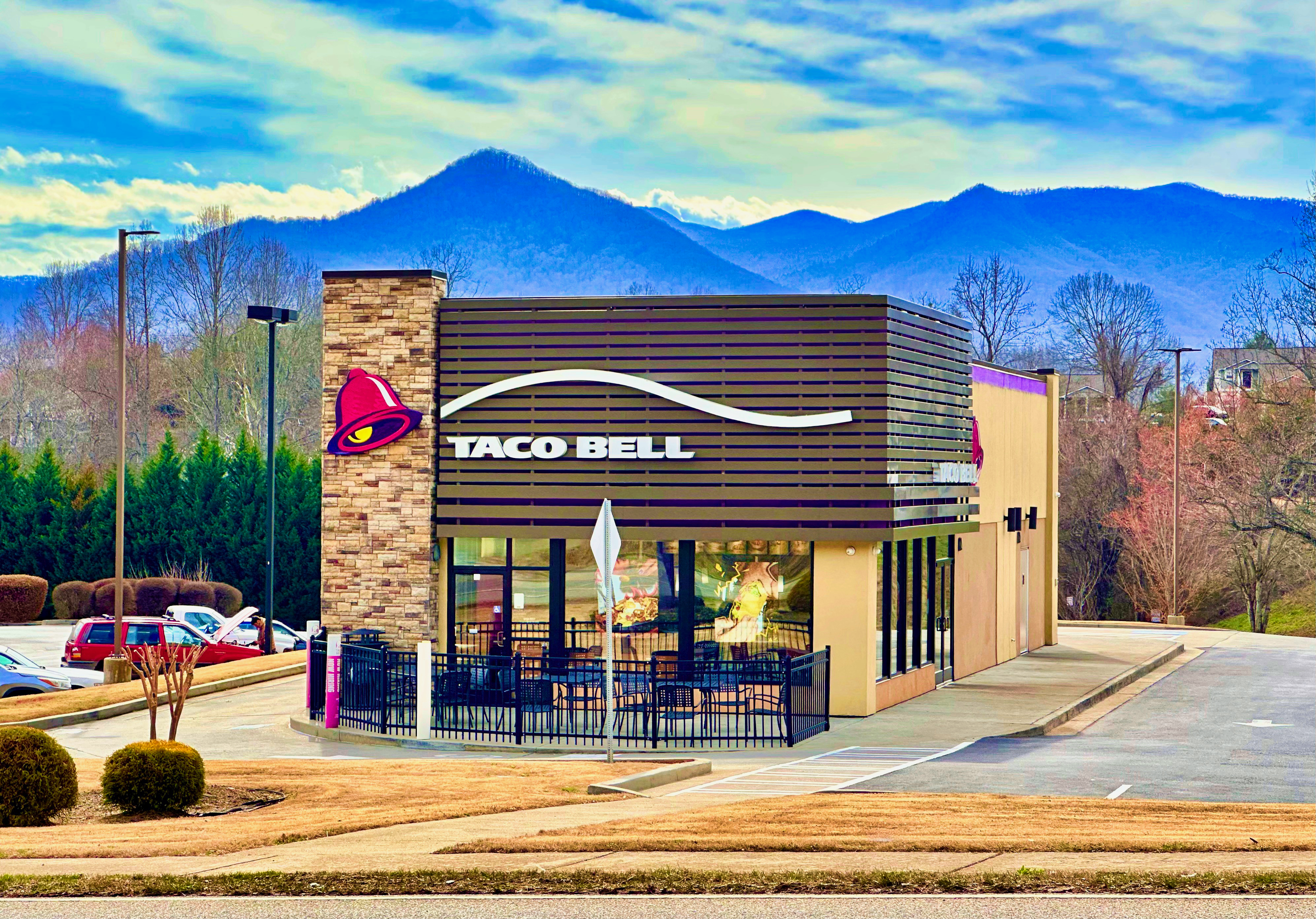
Taco Bell, the magazine's namesake.

Taco Bell Quarterly (TBQ) is an online English-language literary magazine, first established in August of 2019 by M. M. Carrigan. Originally created as a reaction to literary rejection, its pieces draw influence from classical literary ideas, such as David Foster Wallace's essay on the New Sincerity, and the magazine has attracted the attention of national press. Vox wrote, "The hot new literary mag on the scene is Taco Bell Quarterly, a magazine in which every single piece of writing is inspired by Taco Bell."

TBQ "originated as a jab at the pretentiousness of other literary magazines but quickly grew into a celebration in its own right, reveling in the joy of treating low culture with the care and attention often afforded only to high art," relayed Carrigan. They further explained to Salon: "We want to be a place that writers go to get published. There is a little bit of silliness in that, but it's not necessarily mocking stuff. I want to be another option among the range of places where you can get published."

According to Food & Wine, the first issue was downloaded by approximately 1,500 people. Volume 2, released in 2020, was viewed by 40,000 people. "People think we're a joke, but... Writers are taking chances in writing in our magazine that I don't think the literary world has seen in a long time. We're writing with radical sincerity," Carrigan said.

Taco Bell Quarterly has won a Circle of Excellence award from the Council for Advancement and Support of Education in 2021, and Kristin Garth's "Addiction" was nominated for a Best of the Net award.

Although the magazine is unaffiliated with the fast food chain, the editors state they have yet to receive a cease and desist for use of the name.
