= One cool word =

one cool word magazine is a Vancouverlogue art and literary publication from Vancouver, British Columbia, with a full-length CD compilation of content from Metro Vancouverites accompanied in every issue. Its mandate was: "Our quest to encourage creative work in the city takes place on many levels: we invite people to submit work, we invite people to create writing, art, and music at our events, we choose work on the basis of quality of thought, freshness of vision and innovation in form, and we showcase work by professionals and up-and-comers side by side, to declare that everyone has the capacity to be an artist and to share the bliss of being on the giving and/or receiving end of expression."

The magazine featured many subgenres within the genres of art, writing, and music, from painting to cartoons, non-fiction to experimental writing, and spoken word to electronic music. one cool word magazine was 100% Vancouver owned and operated, and was independent, not-for-profit and volunteer-run. It was published from 2006 to 2013.

== History ==
one cool word magazine was created by Tracy Stefanucci and Ken Yong, with the first issue released in April 2006. The name is a play on words, and a joke about the fact that most magazine titles are simply one word that is cool (although, many people mistake the name for one cool world). The magazine's initial aims were to create a platform for work that was not currently being showcased in other Vancouver publications, and to unite the genres of art, writing and music to create dialogue between different mediums.

Since 2007, ocw evolved to focus on inspiring creation and artistic development on a city, community and individual level.

ocw was mentioned in Geist, Other Voices, Inc., Ricepaper, The Tyee (online), CITR-FM (radio), 99.3 The Fox (radio), and A New Rock Reality (TV).

Featured contributors included Mary Schendlinger, Nathan Sellyn, Brenden McLeod, Severn Cullis-Suzuki, Jessica Glesby, Kegan McFadden, Tara Gereaux, Randy Jacobs, Barbara Adler, Brandon Yan, CR Avery, Magpie Ulysses, Sean McGarragle, Chelsea Rooney, Colin J. Stewart, Emily Wight, Cathleen With, Elliot Lummin, Rob Taylor, Jenni Uitto, Sam Rappaport, Byron Barrett, Mary Kim, Fraser MacLean, Carter-Ethan Rankin, Shannon Rayne, Howard Penning, Mary Finlayson, Elias, Parlour Steps, The Februarys, Hey Ocean!, Wintermitts, The Sessions, Octoberman, RC Weslowski, Lotus Child, Love and Mathematics, Panurge, The Mohawk Lodge, and In Medias Res.

== Issues ==
- Issue #1: Spring 2006
- Issue #2: Summer 2006
- Issue #3: Autumn 2006
- Issue #4: Winter 2006
- Issue #5: Spring 2007
- Issue #6: Summer 2007
- Issue #7: Autumn 2007
- Issue #8: "The Black and White Issue" Winter 2007

== See also ==
- List of literary magazines
