= Writer and Reader =

British literary magazine

The Writer and Reader was a short-lived British literary magazine. It was published monthly during 1888, from August until October, totalling a mere three issues before folding. Each issue of the periodical cost 2d, and was about 20 pages long. In the Dictionary of Nineteenth-Century Journalism, Odin Dekkers calls it "interesting for being one of the few journals explicitly aimed at all three parties involved in the literary process: authors, readers and publishers." In the first issue of Writer and Reader, the editor stated that many authors for financial reasons were unable to properly advertise their work. Therefore, the periodical aimed to improve or extend the ways in which writers and publishers could "bring books under the notice of readers", and make it easier to "find out those books which are worth reading".
