= Optimism Monthly Magazine =

Optimism Monthly was a Czech not-for-profit literary magazine, which from 1995 to 2009 published poetry, prose, and art by Prague-based and international writers. When operational, Optimism published a new edition each month for ten months of the year. Each issue was published in English and contained writers from across Europe, as far east as Bulgaria, as well as American and Australian authors. It sold for 49 Czech crowns in English-Language book stores across Prague, Europe, the United States and Australia. As of 2009, it had published works by over one hundred and thirty writers. It was started by an American, Tim Otis, who was joined after the second issue by another American, Thomas Alan Ward, as editor, after issue 30, Ward was replaced by Laura Conway. There were a total of 49 issues.

Though now defunct, the magazine persists in a virtual form via its website, where a pdf file of the latest edition is available to download. The website maintains its original product description, and has released a notice (dated from both 2003 and 2009 on different pages of the website) concerning its future publication:

While Optimism Monthly no longer publishes a monthly hard copy version, many back issues are still available through the above address. The cost is US$5 per back issue which includes overseas first class air mail delivery within three weeks. The understock [sic] of the publication continues to sell locally at THE GLOBE BOOKSTORE AND CAFE and at SHAKESPEARE & SONS. The literary community continues to embrace Optimism Monthly as one of the flagship publications for the English speaking creative community. An anthology of the publications print run is being compiled for release at a later date. Many of the featured writers in Optimism Monthly have gone on to larger audiences with their own published works.
