= Xavier Review =

- Discipline: Literary journal
- Language: English

Publication details
- History: 1980 to present
- Publisher: Xavier University of Louisiana (United States)
- Frequency: Biannual

Standard abbreviations
- ISO 4: Xavier Rev.

Indexing
- ISSN: 0887-6681

Links
- Journal homepage

Xavier Review is a humanities journal published at Xavier University in Louisiana and the oldest American literary journal based at an historically black college. Xavier Review was founded in 1980. Two issues are published each year.

== Editors ==
The current editor is poet Ralph Adamo. Previous editors include Nicole Pepinster Greene, Richard Collins, Thomas Bonner, Jr. and Charles Fort. Founded by critic Thomas Bonner and poet Charles Fort. The managing editor is Katheryn Laborde.

== Contributors ==
Among its early contributors were Alex Haley, Houston Baker, Walker Percy and Ernest Gaines. More recent contributors of note include poets Richard Spilman, James Doyle, and Radoslav Rochallyi, and fiction writer Jacob M. Appel.

== See also ==
- List of literary magazines
