= Tulane Review =

American literary magazine

Tulane Review is a literary magazine published by the members of the Tulane Literary Society of Tulane University located in New Orleans, Louisiana.

== History and profile ==
First published in 1968, the Review consists of submissions of art, poetry, and prose which are judged by members of student review boards before being selected for final publication by the editors. It accepts work from both professional and amateur writers and artists from across the world, while generally seeking to publish some work from the Tulane community whenever possible. The magazine is published twice a year in the fall and spring.

The Review is the recipient of the design award of the AWP Literary Magazine.

== See also ==
- List of literary magazines
