= Sean Beaudoin =

American writer

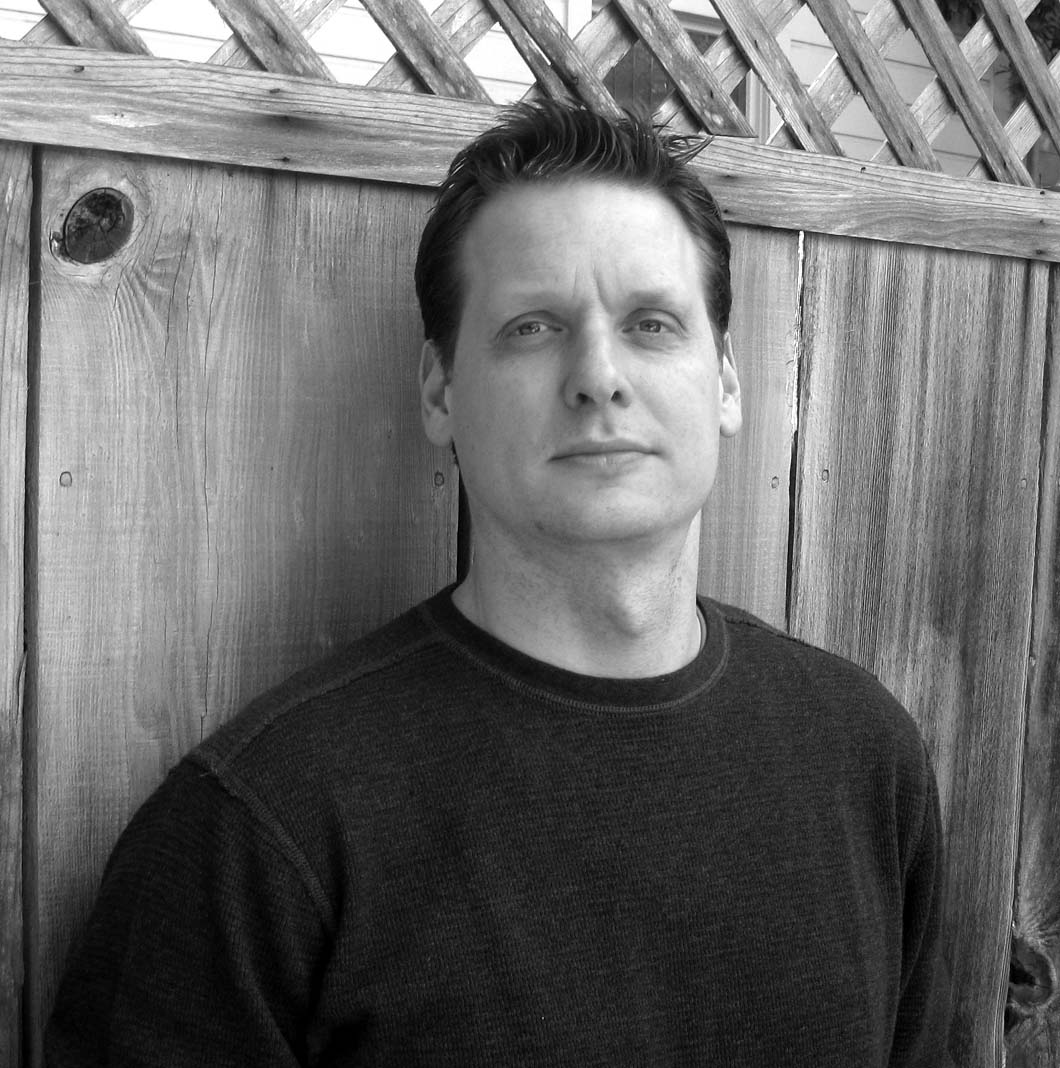

Background information
- Origin: Seattle, Washington, United States
- Genres: Young adult
- Labels: publisher: Little Brown
- Website: SeanBeaudoin.com

Sean Beaudoin is an American writer.

== Biography ==
Beaudoin is the author of the Young Adult novels Going Nowhere Faster, Fade To Blue, You Killed Wesley Payne, The Infects, and Wise Young Fool. He has a collection of adult short stories forthcoming from Algonquin Press. His short stories and articles have appeared in numerous publications including The Onion, Glimmer Train, The San Francisco Chronicle, Opium, Narrative Magazine, Bat City Review, Identity Theory, Instant City, Another Chicago Magazine, The New Orleans Review, Barrelhouse, Bayou, and Redivider. He is a founding editor of the arts and culture website TheWeeklings.com

== Published works ==
=== Novels ===
- You Killed Wesley Payne, 2011, Little Brown
- Fade To Blue, 2009, Little Brown
- Going Nowhere Faster, 2008, Little Brown
- The Infects, 2011, Candlewick Press.
- Wise Young Fool, 2012, Little, Brown

=== Short stories ===
- Identity Theory, "Spectacle"
- Narrative Magazine, "Night Dreams"
- "Winter Ninety-Five Spring Ninety-Six", Fall 2008
- New Orleans Review - "Fight"s
- Opium "The Bridesmaid"
- Danger City Anthology

=== Articles ===
- The Onion
- San Francisco Chronicle
- Glimmer Train
