= SNReview =

- Discipline: literary magazine
- Language: English
- Edited by: Joseph Conlin

Publication details
- History: 1999 to present

Standard abbreviations
- ISO 4: SNReview

Indexing
- ISSN: 1527-344X

Links
- Journal homepage

SNReview is a seasonal online literary magazine founded in 1999. It has published the poetry and prose of Stephen Gyllenhaal, Adrian Louis, and Steve Poleskie, among others. In the past three years, page views have risen almost sixfold with the average issue receiving more than 20,000 page views.

It publishes prose works of less than 7000 words with traditional emphasis of good writing: strong characters, good plot and theme, imagery, style of writing, and point of view. On its guidelines page, the magazine quotes C. Michael Curtis, fiction editor of The Atlantic Monthly: “What most editors look for, in addition to a respect for conventional strengths of orderly composition, is a sentence or two sufficiently complex in structure and idea to signify a serious mind at work. Editors look for engaging sensibility, a writer with wit, imagination, and an appreciation for the benefits of a well-constructed sentence.” These same qualities are what the editor is looking for from poets and writers of creative nonfiction.

== History ==
The magazine came to life with the advent of free and low-cost web hosting as well as the maturation of WYSIWYG HTML software. The original name of the publication was Starry Night Review, named for the 1889 painting by Vincent van Gogh. During its early years, the publication used the free web sites available from AOL, Yahoo's GeoCities, and Angelfire. From the beginning, the publication has been created using Sun Microsystem's StarOffice software. The graphics have been created with Micrografx's Picture Publisher 8 software for the entire nine years.

In May 2004, SNReview achieved its own domain site and began an ongoing process of simplifying its graphics to make the publication easier to load and to read. The publication has no income and therefore has not earned a profit in its nine years. With the introduction of a pdf converter to Star Office 8, the magazine began posting works in both HTML and pdf formats. It is a member of Council of Literary Magazines and Presses, the American Academy of Poets, and the Connecticut Authors and Publishers Association. CAPA.

Working in conjunction with Lulu.com, SNReview offers readers the opportunity to order print editions of newly released issues.

About three years ago, the magazine began publishing an index of writers whose works have appeared in the publication and created a book store that features the covers to the books written by authors with links to Barnes & Noble, Amazon.com, or the publisher of the work.

== See also ==
- List of literary magazines
