= Natural Bridge (magazine) =

American literary magazine

- Categories: Literary magazine
- Frequency: Biannual
- Publisher: University of Missouri–St. Louis
- First issue: Spring 1999
- Country: United States
- Based in: St. Louis, Missouri
- Language: English
- Website: www.boulevardmagazine.org
- ISSN: 1525-9897

Natural Bridge is an American literary magazine, based at University of Missouri-St. Louis. It was established in 1999 and the first issue was published in Spring 1999. The magazine is published biannually and features articles on fiction, essays, and poetry. The editor-in-chief is John Dalton. Molly Harris is managing editor.

In 2020, Natural Bridge ceased print publication. Its last physical edition was issue number 43. It is now published online as a subdivision of fellow St Louis–based literary journal Boulevard. The magazine's reading series—previously an in-person event—also moved online May 2020.

== Other anthologies ==
Work that has appeared in Natural Bridge has been short-listed on numerous occasions for the Best American Short Stories, the O. Henry Award, and the Pushcart Prize.

== Notable contributors ==
- Jacob M. Appel
- Dwight Bitikofer
- Todd Davis
- Mary Ruth Donnelly
- Rodger Kamenetz
- Kirsti Sandy
- Erin Wilson

== Honors and awards ==
- Andao Tian's story, "The Death of My Mad Uncle," which appeared in issue no. 16, was short-listed for the O. Henry Prize in 2008.
- Kent Annan's essay "A Drop of Water," which appeared in issue no. 14, honored with "Special Mention" by The Best American Essays in 2006.
- Roger Hart's story, "Lubing," which appeared in issue no. 5, was short-listed for the Pushcart Prize in 2003.
- Leslie Pietrzyk's story, "This Day with You," which appeared in issue no. 1, was short-listed for The Pushcart Prize 2001.
- Brian Doyle's essay, "Notes on the Poem 'Ggfddfg' by Joseph Doyle," which appeared in issue no. 06, cited as "Notable Essay of 2001 in The Best American Essays.
- Lela Nargi, "Into the Thar" and Kathlene Postma, "Becoming Foreign" were both honored as "Notable Travel Writing" in the Best American Travel Writing of 2001.

== See also ==
- List of literary magazines
