= The Newtowner: An Arts and Literary Magazine =

American literary magazine

The Newtowner: An Arts and Literary Magazine is a quarterly arts and literary magazine featuring fiction, poetry, memoir, essays, columns, features and artwork by local literary, visual and performing artists, both new and established, from the western Connecticut region and beyond. The Newtowner is a community based literary and arts project staffed by local volunteers.

In its Spring 2011 issue, The Newtowner will debut Youth Expressions - a section for young writers and artists. Other sections includes: The Newtowner Book Club, a calendar of local arts and literary events, and a directory of local arts and literary groups.

The Newtowner is published by Literarti Publishing, founded in March, 2010. Its first issue debuted in December 2010.
