= Pleiades (journal) =

American literary journal

- Discipline: Literary journal
- Language: English
- Edited by: Jenny Molberg

Publication details
- History: 1981–present
- Publisher: University of Central Missouri (United States)
- Frequency: Biannual

Standard abbreviations
- ISO 4: Pleiades

Indexing
- ISSN: 1063-3391
- OCLC no.: 264797427

Links
- Journal homepage

Pleiades: Literature in Context is a biannual literary journal that publishes contemporary poetry, fiction, essays, and book reviews. It was founded by undergraduate students at the University of Central Missouri in 1981. The non-profit journal is published by the University of Central Missouri's Department of English and Philosophy. Pleiades publishes work from both established and emerging authors, and dedicates half of each issue to detailed book reviews of recent small-press poetry and fiction. Pleiades is funded by the University of Central Missouri and grants from the Missouri Arts Council. Its headquarters is in Warrensburg, Missouri.

The affiliated Pleiades Press publishes several books of poetry and prose each year through the Lena-Miles Wever Todd poetry prize, the Pleiades Press Editors Prize for Poetry, the Robert C. Jones Prize for Short Prose, and the Visual Poetry Series.

== Awards ==
In addition to fifteen Pushcart Prizes works from Pleiades have been selected for The Best American Poetry anthology annually since 2001.

== Notable contributors ==
Past contributors to Pleiades include winners of the Nobel, Ruth Lilly, Pulitzer, Bollingen, Prix de la Liberté, and Neustadt Prizes, as well as recipients of Guggenheim, Whiting, National Book Critics Circle and National Book Awards. Notable contributors include Joyce Carol Oates, Campbell McGrath, David St. John, Maxine Kumin, Sherman Alexie, Chris Offutt, Jean Valentine, D. A. Powell, Mark Halliday, Mary Jo Bang, Jaswinder Bolina, Victoria Chang, Zachary Mason, Amina Gautier, James Richardson, Jack Pendarvis, Sean Gill, Randall Mann, Tiphanie Yanique, Troy Jollimore, Julie Sheehan, Bonnie Jo Campbell, and Melissa Kwasny, among many others.

== See also ==
- List of literary magazines
