= Louisiana Literature =

American literary magazine

Louisiana Literature is a literary magazine. Founded in 1984 by Southeastern Louisiana University, it publishes fiction, poetry, and creative nonfiction quarterly. As of 2006 the magazine was published biannually.

== Editors ==
Editor, as of October 2009, was Jack Bedell.

== Honors and awards ==
- Writer's Digest named Louisiana Literature a "Top 50" market for both fiction and poetry in 2008.

== Masthead ==
As of October 2009:

- Editor: Jack B. Bedell
- Associate Editors: Norman German, William Parrill
- On-line Editor: Chris Tusa

== See also ==
- List of literary magazines
