= Harpur Palate =

American literary magazine

- Current Editor-in-Chief: Heather Humphrey
- Categories: Literary magazine
- Frequency: Biannual
- Publisher: Department of English, Binghamton University
- Founded: 2001
- Country: United States
- Language: English
- Website: harpurpalate.binghamton.edu
- ISSN: 1533-6301
- OCLC: 45827180

Harpur Palate is a biannual literary magazine published by Binghamton University. It publishes fiction, essays, and poetry. Past contributors to the journal have been honored in the Best American Short Stories and the O. Henry Prize Stories. The journal also awards the John Gardner Memorial Prize for Fiction with its Summer/Fall edition, the Milt Kessler Memorial Prize for Poetry with its Winter/Spring edition, and the Harpur Palate Award for Creative Nonfiction with its Winter/Spring issue.

== See also ==
- List of literary magazines
