= The Cortland Review =

Online literary magazine

- Editor: Ginger Murchison
- Categories: Literary magazine
- Frequency: Bimonthly
- Publisher: Guy Shahar
- First issue: 1997
- Country: United States
- Based in: New York City
- Language: English
- Website: www.cortlandreview.com
- ISSN: 1524-6744

The Cortland Review is an online literary magazine established in 1997, publishing in 6 annual issues the work of prominent poets and writers in text, audio, and video.

== See also ==
- List of literary magazines
