= Corey Mesler =

American writer

Corey Mesler is an American writer. Mesler's work has been published in numerous journals and anthologies including The Esquire Narrative4 Project (2013), The Machinery and Good Poems, American Places (Viking Press 2011). He has published nine novels, Talk: A Novel in Dialogue (2002), We Are Billion-Year-Old Carbon (2006), The Ballad of the Two Tom Mores (2010), Following Richard Brautigan (2010), Gardner Remembers (2011), Frank Comma and the Time-Slip (2012), Diddy-Wah-Diddy: A Beale Street Suite (2013), Memphis Movie (2015), and Robert Walker (2016); eight full length poetry collections: Some Identity Problems (2008), Before the Great Troubling (2011), Our Locust Years (2013), The Catastrophe of my Personality (2014),The Sky Needs More Work (2014),Opaque Melodies that Would Bug Most People (2015), Among the Mensans (2016), and Madstones (2018); and four books of short stories, Listen: 29 Short Conversations (2009), Notes toward the Story and Other Stories (2011) I'll Give You Something to Cry About (2011), and As a Child (2014). He has also published a dozen chapbooks of both poetry and prose. Three of his poems have been chosen for Garrison Keillor’s Writer’s Almanac. He also wrote the screenplay for "We Go On," which won The Memphis Film Prize in 2017. With his wife, he runs Burke's Book Store in Memphis, Tennessee. It is one of the oldest independent bookstores in the United States.
