= Lyn Lifshin =

American poet and teacher (1942–2019)

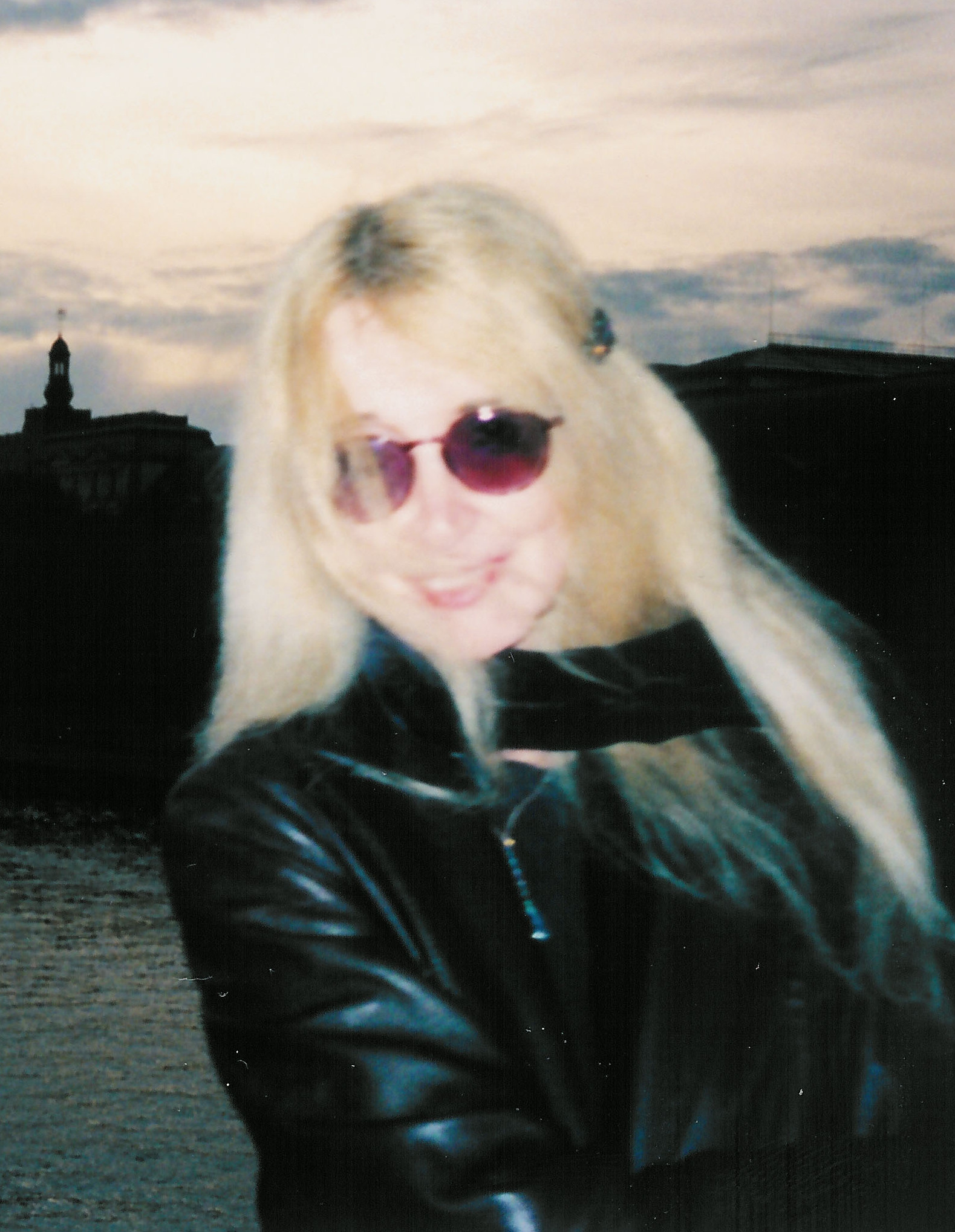
- Lifshin in Paris
- Born: Lyn Diane Lipman; July 12, 1942 Burlington, Vermont, U.S.
- Died: December 9, 2019 (aged 77) Vienna, Virginia, U.S.
- Occupation: poet, university lecturer
- Education: Bread Loaf School of English
- Alma mater: Syracuse University; University of Vermont
- Period: 1971 to 2022
- Genre: Poetry

Website
- www.lynlifshin.com

Lyn Diane Lifshin (née Lipman; July 12, 1942 – December 9, 2019) was an American poet and teacher. Lifshin was widely published and known as “one of the early feminist poets who worked outside academia.” Her work was autobiographical and explored sexuality, war, and a woman's role in society.

== Early life ==
Born in Burlington, Vermont as Lyn Diane Lipman and was raised in Middlebury, Vermont. Her father was from Boston and she visited the area frequently as a child. She was Jewish.

She earned a BA in English from Syracuse University in 1961 and a MA in English from the University of Vermont in 1963. She enrolled in a doctoral program in English at State University of New York at Albany from 1964 to 1966 where she was also a teaching fellow. She also studied at Brandeis University and the Bread Loaf School of English.

== Career ==
While at SUNY Albany, she began submitting her poems for publication. She was first published in 1967 in Kauri, the anti-war mimeo magazine. Her poetry was influenced by the Beat Poets, Sylvia Plath, and Anne Sexton. Her poems feature incomplete sentences, pauses, short lines, sudden revelations, and "a breathless quality". Most of her poems are shorter than thirty lines. She tended to write many poems on the same subject rather than reworking a single poem.

She taught at the State University of New York at Cobleskill in 1970 and at Empire State College in 1973. She was a poet-in-residence at Mansfield State College in 1974, the University of Rochester in 1986, the Antioch Writers Conference in 1987, and Colorado Mountain College in 1994 and 1998. She taught at Union College from 1980 to 1985. She also taught creative writing workshops at various public venues such as libraries and her home in Niskayuna, New York.

Lifshin has been called "The Queen of the Small Presses". She was a very prolific poet, publishing over 130 books and chapbooks. Her work appeared in numerous literary magazines and cultural publications, including Earth's Daughters, The American Poetry Review, The American Scholar, Christian Science Monitor, The Georgia Review, Underground Voices, Ploughshares, Dunes Review, Rolling Stone Magazine, and Yankee. She also edited anthologies, appeared in others, and was the subject of the documentary film Lyn Lifshin: Not Made of Glass by director Mary Ann Lynch.

Lifshin received numerous fellowships, including the Yaddo Fellowship (1970, 1971, 1975, 1979, and 1980), the MacDowell Fellowship (1973), and the Millay Colony Fellowship (1975 and 1979). She won the Creative Artists Public Service Award in 1976, the Hart Crane Award, Cherry Valley Edition Jack Kerouac Award for Kiss the Skin Off in 1984, and the Madelin Sadin Award in 1989. The Albany Public Library Foundation named her a Literary Legend.

== Personal life ==
She married Eric Lifshin in 1966. She withdrew from Brandeis University after getting married. They moved to Schenectady, New York in the 1970s where he worked for General Electric. They divorced in 1978.

Later in life, she divided her time between a home in Niskayuna, New York and a residence in Vienna, Virginia. She died in 2019 in Vienna after an illness and a fall.

== Selected publications ==
=== Poetry ===
- Black Apples. Trumansburg, New York: Crossing Press, 1971. ISBN 9780912278001
- The Old House on the Croton. San Lorenzo, California: Shameless Hussy Press, 1973. ISBN 9780915288083
- Shaker House Poems.2nd edition. Chatham, New York: Sagarin Press, 1976. ISBN 978-0915298020
- Upstate Madonna: Poems 1970–1974. Trumansburg, New York: Crossing Press, 1974. ISBN 978-0912278629
- Old House Poems (Capra Chapbook Series #28). Santa Barbara, California: Capra Press, 1975. ISBN 9780884960218
- Naked Charm. Madison, Wisconsin: Fireweed Press, 1976. ISBN 9780898070064
- Paper Apples. Stockton, California: Wormwood, 1976. ISBN 9780935390001
- Leaning South. New York: Red Dust, 1977, ISBN 97808737603007
- Offered by Owner: A Collection of Lyn Lifshin Poems. Cambridge, New York: Natalie Slohm, 1978. ISBN 9780916840037
- Poems. with John Elsberg. Filey, Yorkshire: Fiasco, 1978, ISBN 0903711354
- 35 Sundays. Chicago: Ommation Press, 1979. ISBN 9780317064391
- Blue Dust, New Mexico. Fredonia, New York: Basilisk Press, 1982. ISBN 9780913560112
- Madonna Who Shifts for Herself. Long Beach, California: Applezaba, 1983. ISBN 9780930090180
- Kiss the Skin Off. New York: Cherry Valley Editions, 1985. ISBN 9780916156695
- Remember the Ladies. East Lansing, Michigan: Ghost Dance Press, 1985. ISBN 9780317197945
- Vergin' Mary and Madonna. with Belinda Subraman. Paso, Texas: Vergin Press, 1986. ISBN 978-0935839012
- Raw Opals. Los Angeles: Illuminati Press, 1987. ISBN 9780898072518
- Red Hair and the Jesuit. Parkdale, Oregon: Trout Creek Press, 1987. ISBN 9780916155056
- The Doctor Poems. Los Angeles: Applezaba, 1988. ISBN 9780930090425
- Eye of the Beast. Vergin Press, 1988. ISBN 9780935839029
- Many Madonnas: Poems. St. John, Kansas: Kindred Spirit Press, 1988. ISBN 9780943795027
- Rubbed Silk. Los Angeles: Illuminati Press, 1988. ISBN 9780898072525
- Dance Poems. Chicago: Ommation Press, 1990. ISBN 9780941240055
- Not Made of Glass: Poems, 1968-1988. Saratoga Springs, New York: Karista, 1990. ISBN 9780918670021
- Marilyn Monroe: Poems. Portland, Oregon: Quiet Lion, 1994. ISBN 9781882550029
- Parade. Stockton, California: Wormwood Review, 1994. ISBN 9780935390193
- Blue Tattoo: Poems of the Holocaust. Desert Hot Springs, California: Event Horizon Press, 1995. ISBN 9781880391129
- The Mad Girl Drives in a Daze. Long Beach: JVC Books, 1995. ISBN 9781878116376
- New Point Shoes. Long Beach: JVC Books, 1995. ISBN 9781878116383
- Cold Comfort: Selected Poems, 1970–1996. Santa Rosa, California: Black Sparrow Press, 1997. ISBN 9781574230413
- Jesus Christ Live and in the Flesh. Portland, Oregon: Future Tense Books, 1997. ISBN 9780965319454
- Restrooms, Anyone?. Long Beach: JVC Books, 1997. ISBN 9781878116376
- Before It's Light: New Poems. Santa Rosa, California: Black Sparrow Press, 1999. ISBN 9781574231144
- A New Film About A Woman in Love with the Dead. Greensboro, North Carolina: March Street Press, 2003. ISBN 9781882983834g
- Barbie Poems I. San Pedro: Lummox Press, 2005. ISBN 9781929878468
- Barbie Poems II. San Pedro: Lummox Press, 2005. ISBN 9781929878475
- The Licorice Daughter: My Year with Ruffian. Huntsville, Texas: Texas Review Press, 2005. ISBN 9781881515791
- Out of Line: Imaginative Writings on Peace and Justice. London: Garden House Press, 2005. ISBN 9780975310724
- Another Woman Who Looks Like Me: Poems. Santa Rosa, California: Black Sparrow Press, 2006. ISBN 9781574231984
- In Mirrors. Rockford. Michigan: Presa Press, 2006. ISBN 9780977252435
- 92 Rapple Drive. Coatlism Press, 2008, ISBN 9780980207316
- Desire. Huntington Beach, California: World Parade Books, 2008. ISBN 9780981713601
- Light at the End: The Jesus Poems. Rochester: Clevis Hook Press, 2008. ISBN 9780982171806
- Lost in the Fog. Georgetown, Kentucky: Finishing Line Press, 2008, ISBN 9781599243429
- Nutley Pond. Waldoboro, Maine: Goose River Press, 2008. ISBN 9781597130684
- Persephone. Pasadena, California: Red Hen Press, 2008. ISBN 9781597091244
- Ballet Madonnas: Poems. Alpharetta, Georgia: Alpharetta, GAShoe Music Press, 2009. ISBN 9780982363102
- Barbaro: Beyond Brokenness. Huntsville, Texas: Texas Review Press, 2009, ISBN 9781933896168
- Ballroom: Poems. Greensboro, North Carolina: March Street Press, 2010. ISBN 9781596611429
- Katrina. Lake Isabella, California: Poetic Matrix Press, 2010, ISBN 9780982734308
- Knife Edge & Absinthe – The Tango Poems. Cleveland: NightBallet Press, 2012. ISBN 9780985671518
- A Girl Goes into the Woods. Beacon, New York: NYQ Books, 2013. ISBN 9781935520320
- When a Cat Dies. Oklahoma City: Smashwords Edition, 2014. ISBN 9781937050191
- Femme Eterna. Glenview, Illinois: Glass Lyre Press, 2014. ISBN 9780984035250
- Malala. Lake Isabella, California: Poetic Matrix Press, 2014. ISBN 9780986060021
- Secretariat: The Red Freak, The Miracle. Huntsville, Texas: Texas Review Press, 2014. ISBN 9781937875619
- Moving Thru Stained Glass: The Maple Poems. Cleveland: NightBallet Press, 2015. ISBN 9781940996738
- Little Dancer: The Degas Poems. Cleveland: NightBallet Press, 2015. ISBN 9780989310673
- #AliveLikeALoadedGun. Houston: Transcendent Zero Press, 2016. ISBN 9780692729953
- Barbaro: Beyond Brokenness. Huntsville, Texas: Texas Review Press, 2022. ISBN 9781680032871

=== Anthologies ===
- Six Poets. Newtown, Australia: Vagabond Press, 1979. ISBN 9780912824215
- Mondo Marilyn: A Collection of Stories and Poems about Marilyn. New York: St. Martin's Press, 1995. ISBN 9780312118532
- In the Arms of Words: Poems for Disaster Relief. Sherman Aster Publishing, 2006. ISBN 9781890932305
- Lyrotica: An Anthology of Erotic Poetry and Prose. Apollo Beach, Florida: Vagabondage Press, 2011. ISBN 978-0981919874
- Big Pulp: We Honor Those Who Serve. Exter Press, 2012. ISBN 9780983644941
- Buzzkill: Apocalypse - An End of the World Anthology. Cleveland: NightBallet Press, 2012. ISBN 978-0985789701
- Written on Water. Bay City, Michigan: Mayapple Press, 2013. ISBN 9781936419302
- Oct Tongue 2. Cleveland: Crisis Chronicles Press, 2017. ISBN 9781940996479

=== Editor ===
- Tangled Vines: A Collection of Mother and Daughter Poems. Boston: Beacon Press, 1978. ISBN 9780807063668
- Ariadne's Thread: A Collection of Contemporary Women's Journals. New York, Harper and Row, 1982. ISBN 9780060909413
- Lips Unsealed: Confidences from Contemporary Women Writers. Santa Barbara, California. Capra Press, 1990. ISBN 9780884963097
- Mondo Barbie: An Anthology of Fiction & Poetry. New York: St. Martin's Press, 1993. ISBN 9780312088484
- All The Poets Who Have Touched Me. Huntington Beach, California: World Parade Books, 2010. ISBN 9780984619856
