= Creative Flight =

- Discipline: Literature, Language, Literary Theory, Humanities, Social Sciences
- Language: English
- Edited by: Dipak Giri

Publication details
- History: 2020–present
- Publisher: Creative Flight: An International Half-Yearly Open Access Peer-Reviewed E-Journal in English (India)
- Frequency: Biannually

Standard abbreviations
- ISO 4: CF

Indexing
- ISSN: 2582-6158

Links
- Journal homepage; Online Archives

Creative Flight (also known as CF) is a nonprofit peer-reviewed journal from Cooch Behar, West Bengal, India in the field of literature, language, literary theory, humanities and social sciences. Since 2020, it has been appearing biannually in April and October; however, in 2025, two special issues (January and July) were added to it. Its founder and managing editor is Dipak Giri.

== Focus and scope ==
Creative Flight publishes articles, poems, short plays, short stories and travelogues including texts originally written in English and translations into English from other languages. It also publishes book reviews and author interviews.

== Contents ==
The journal has published work of both creative and academic writers from India and abroad.

=== Some notable Indian writers published in this journal ===
- Abhay K
- Anju Makhija
- Amol Redij
- D. C. Chambial
- Dipak Giri
- Gopi Kottoor
- Jernail Singh Anand
- K. V. Dominic
- K. Satchidanandan
- Kuli Kohli
- Manu Bhattathiri
- Meher Pestonji
- Nalini Priyadarshni
- Nandini Sahu
- Neelam Saxena Chandra
- P C K Prem
- Ram Krishna Singh
- Rochelle Potkar
- Smita Agarwal
- Tapan Kumar Pradhan
- Vinita Agrawal

=== Some notable non-Indian writers published in this journal ===
- Baron Wormser
- Bernard Pearson
- Bruce Bond
- Daya Dissanayake
- Des Dillon
- Emily Critchley
- Esther Morgan
- Fiona Sampson
- Geoffrey Philp
- Gregory Woods
- Hugh McMillan
- Jee Leong Koh
- John Eppel
- John Guzlowski
- Josephine Dickinson
- Kamala Wijeratne
- Malachi Edwin Vethamani
- Mike Jenkins
- Miriam Sagan
- Peter Robinson
- Randolph Healy
- Sarah Wardle
- Sean Street
- Sheenagh Pugh
- Ted Pearson
- Victor Rodriguez Nunez
- Zvonko Taneski

== Editorial board ==
The journal's editorial and advisory boards include notable scholars and writers such as Bill Ashcroft, Aparna Lanjewar Bose, Imre Szeman, Malachi Edwin Vethamani, Jernail Singh Anand and Nandini Sahu.
