= Cambridge Literary Review =

Literary magazine published by the University of Cambridge

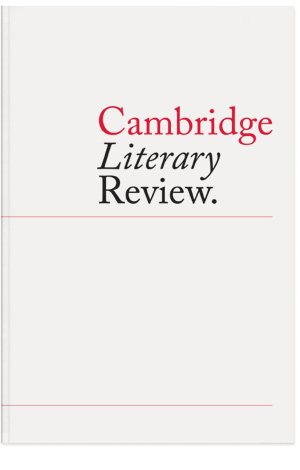
The Cover of Cambridge Literary Review, Issue 1. Designed by Will Brady

The Cambridge Literary Review (CLR) is a literary magazine published on an occasional basis. It is edited by Lydia Wilson, Rosie Šnajdr, Jocelyn Betts and Paige Smeaton and is run from Trinity Hall college at the University of Cambridge in England. It was founded in 2009 by Boris Jardine and Lydia Wilson with assistance from the University's 800th anniversary fund. It publishes poetry, short fiction and criticism, and although its commitment to experimental and often difficult works is influenced by the 'Cambridge School' of poetry it has included contributions by writers from around the world and in many languages. It has received notice in The Times Literary Supplement.

== Volume I (issues 1–3) ==
The first two issues include: poetry by J. H. Prynne, John Wilkinson, John Kinsella, Keston Sutherland, Drew Milne, Andrea Brady, Nick Potamitis, Francesca Lisette, Stephen Rodefer, Alice Notley, Posie Rider, Peter Riley, John James, Avery Slater, Alexander Nemser, Geoffrey Hartman, Ray Crump, Sara Crangle, Ian K. Patterson, Rod Mengham, Anna Mendelssohn, Debora Greger, Marianne Morris, Charles Madge; prose, fiction and essays are by Rosie Šnajdr, Helen MacDonald, Charles Lambert, Justin Katko, among others.

CLR1 was dedicated to Cambridge writing, including a long section of essays dedicated to the topic by Jeremy Noel-Tod, Andrew Duncan, Elaine Feinstein, Richard Berengarten, Robert Archambeau, et al. Other essays are included by Raymond Geuss on 'productive obscurity', Stefan Collini on the study of the humanities, Rebecca Stott on historical fiction and Philip Pettit on the now-defunct Cambridge Review. This issue proved controversial, engaging the editors in correspondence with the Times Literary Supplement over comments by reviewer J.C. Similarly, a number of writers associated with Cambridge took up the claims of Robert Archambeau's essay; these responses were discussed on his blog, and a selection were published in CLR2.

CLR3 was dedicated to the theme of 'translation', though the term was taken very loosely, the editors stating that the contents were "not so much straight translations, as meditations on or digressions from the manifold practices, protocols and theories of translation.". This issue featured new work from poets Anne Blonstein, Jonty Tiplady, Rich Owens, as well as translations from Osip Mandelstam, Henri Deluy, Charles Baudelaire, and Hermann Hesse. The prose and essay sections featured Kurt Schwitters, Eric Hazan, Jeremy Hardingham, André Gide and Emily Critchley. A notable essay on the translation of difficult poetry by J. H. Prynne was published, alongside theoretical and historical studies by Nick Jardine, David Bellos, Lydia Davis and others.

Again the issue did not escape unfavourable comment in the N.B. column of the Times Literary Supplement; however, in November 2010 Robert Potts discussed the CLR favourably and at length in his essay review concerning J. H. Prynne.

== Volume II (issues 4–6) ==
CLR4 came out in late November, and contains new poetry by Jean Day, Lisa Robertson, Rachel Blau DuPlessis and Vanessa Place (with a commentary by Emily Critchley), as well as by Simon Jarvis, Jesse Drury and John Wilkinson; prose and fiction is by Iain Sinclair, Raymond Geuss, John Matthias and Lorqi Bilnk.

CLR5 came out in July 2011 and was edited by Boris Jardine and Lydia Wilson. It contains a selection of American writers from the Greenwich Cross-Genre Festival (July 2010), edited and with a commentary by Emily Critchley, featuring: Catherine Wagner, Andrea Brady, Susana Gardner, Lee Ann Brown, Eleni Sikelianos, and Corina Copp (writing on the work of Jean Day). It also contains new poems from: Linus Slug, Ray Crump, Michael Haslam, Peter Gizzi, James Russell, Timothy Thornton, Tomas Weber and Isabelle Ward. Fiction is provided by Valérie Mréjen, translated by Christopher Andrews, and R.F. Walker. Essays and reviews by David Hendy, Helen Macdonald, Jeremy Noel-Tod, Katrina Forrester, Emma Hogan. There is also an interview of Geoffrey Hartman by Xie Qiong and a re-publication of a rare Donald Barthelme short story, ‘The Ontological Basis of Two’.

CLR6 came out in June 2012 and was edited by Boris Jardine, Lydia Wilson, and Rosie Šnajdr. It contains poetry by Rae Armantrout, Tom Graham, Brenda Iijima, Rob Halpern, Joe Luna, Samantha Walton, fiction by Spencer Thomas Campbell, and Lydia Davis, essays by John Wilkinson, Orla Polten, Peter Riley, and Amy De'Ath, as well as a live performance extract by Lisa Jeschke and Lucy Beynon, and a work by Raymond Geuss. The issue also reprinted Gertrude Stein's, 'B.B., or The Birthplace of Bonnes' and Hope Mirrlees', ‘Paris: a poem’.

== Volume III (issues 7 and 8/9) ==
CLR7 came out in November 2013 and was edited by Lydia Wilson, Rosie Šnajdr and Jeremy Noel-Tod. It contains poetry by David Wheatley, Drew Milne, Jesse Drury, and Vahni Capildeo, drama by Ish Klein, fiction by Jennifer Thorp and Ian Holding, and essays by James R. Martin, Mikhal Dekel, Rosie Šnajdr, Robert Kiely and Raymond Geuss.

CLR8/9, the double-length 'Children's Issue', came out in April 2015 and was edited by Lydia Wilson, Rosie Šnajdr, Eve Tandoi, and Jeremy Noel-Tod. It features poetry by Tim Atkins, Joshua Beckman, Andrea Brady and Ayla Ffytche, Kamau Brathwaite, Ian Brinton, Hannah Brooks-Motl, Vahni Capildeo, Patrick Coyle, Michael Farrell, Peter Gizzi, Edmund Hardy, Sophie Herxheimer, Bernadette Mayer, Chris McCabe, Sophie Seita, and Uljana Woolf. It contains a 'choose your own adventure' short story by Rosie Šnajdr. It contains essays by Clementine Beauvais, Nicholas B. Clark, Margaret R. Higonnet, Carrie Hintz, Robert Kiely, Lisa Jarnot, Toby Mitchell, Eve Tandoi, Greg Thomas, and Ross Wolfe. It also re-prints Walter Benjamin's essay 'Berlin Toy Tour II', translated by Jonathan Lutes, and El Lissitzky's 'A Supremacist Tale About Two Squares', colourful socialist propaganda for children.

The issue received notice on The Times Literary Supplement blog .

== Volume IV (issues 10-12) ==
CLR10 came out in June 2016 and was edited by Lydia Wilson and Rosie Šnajdr. It features poetry by Susan Howe, Eileen Myles, Nathaniel Mackey, Vahni Capildeo, Alex Houen, Cole Swensen, Peter Gizzi, Stephen Rodefer, Luke Roberts, Rowan Evans, Ken Cockburn & Alec Finlay, Jesse Drury, and Drew Milne. It contains essays by J.H. Prynne, Hannah Brooks-Motl, Amy Bowles, David Larsen, Tala Jarjour, and Raymond Geuss. It contains fiction by Jocelyn Paul Betts, Mika Seifert, John Saul, Robert Kiely, and Eley Williams.

The issue was reviewed in The Times Literary Supplement.
