= Dipak Giri =

Indian writer and academic

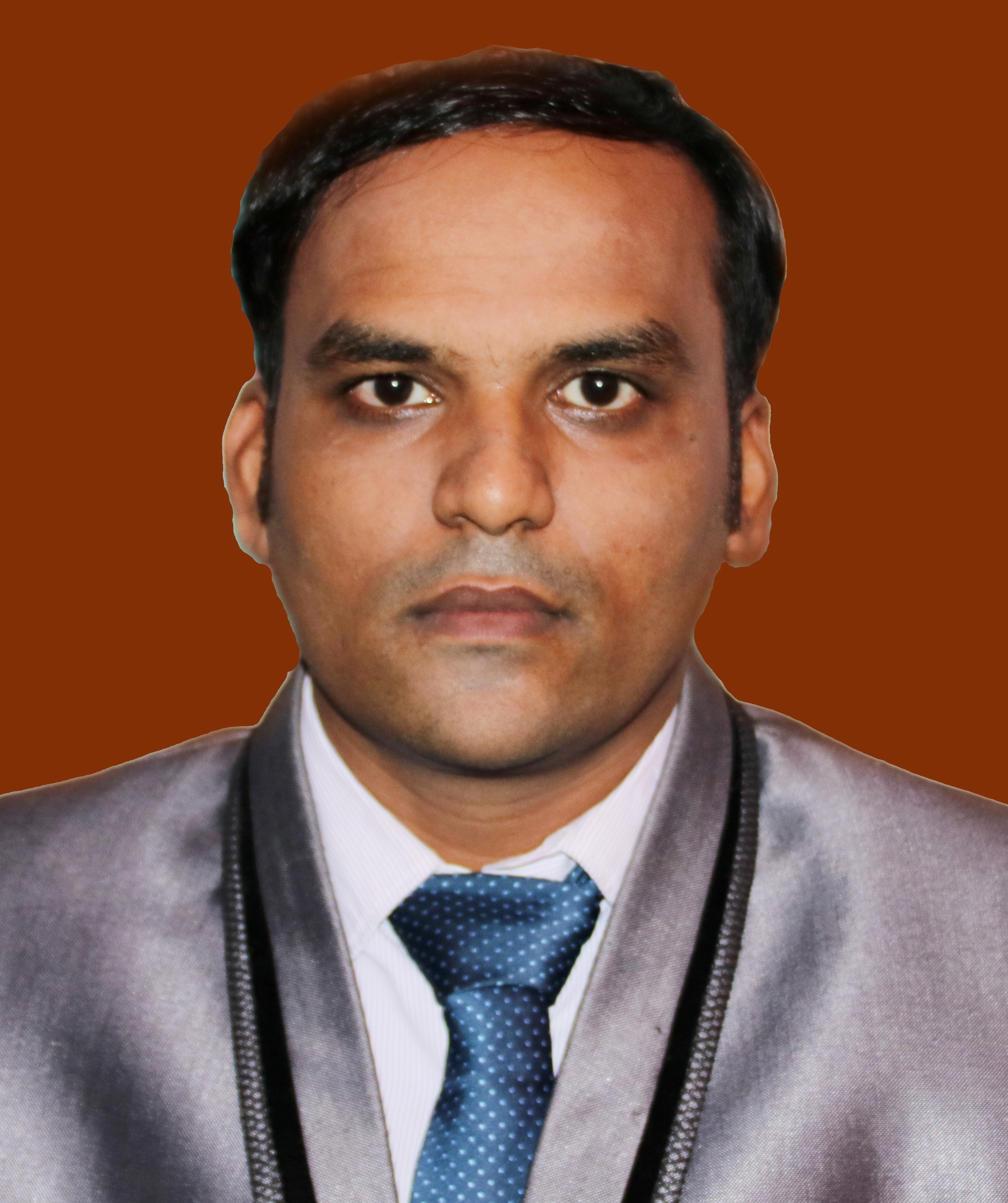
- Born: 7 March 1984 (age 42); Cooch Behar, West Bengal, India
- Citizenship: India
- Education: Doctorate of Philosophy (PhD) in English
- Occupations: Writer, editor, critic, researcher, academic
- Awards: Emerging Editor of the Year (2018) in Vishwabharati Literary Festival at Professor Jayashankar Telangana State Agricultural University, Hyderabad, India and Mewadev Laurel Award (2018) at Contemporary Literary Society of Amlor, Banda, Uttar Pradesh, India
- Website: https://www.dipakgiri.com/ | https://www.creativeflight.in/

Dipak Giri is an Indian writer, editor and academic from Cooch Behar, West Bengal. Presently, he is working as an Editor-in-Chief of Creative Flight, a nonprofit literary journal.

== Early life and education ==
Born and raised in Cooch Behar, West Bengal, Dipak Giri completed his graduation with English honours from University B.T. & Evening College in 2005 and post-graduation in English from University of North Bengal in 2007. Later in 2013, he did another post-graduation in Education from Netaji Subhas Open University. In 2023, he was awarded Doctor of Philosophy from Raiganj University for his research on lesbian sexual minorities as depicted in works of Indian women novelists.

== Career ==
At present Dipak Giri is working as an Assistant Teacher in English at Katamari High School (H.S.) in his home district Cooch Behar. He is also an Invitee Faculty of post-graduation at Cooch Behar Panchanan Barma University, Cooch Behar College Study Centre and an Academic Counsellor of English at Netaji Subhas Open University in the same college study centre.

== Works ==
Dipak Giri's works chiefly focus on Indian women, Dalits, tribes, LGBTQ and marginalised people.

New Woman in Indian Literature: From Covert to Overt (2018) is a study on modern and unconventional women characters as depicted in Indian literature. The book, according to P C K Prem "brings together various aspects of existential conflicts the ‘New Woman’ confronts boldly and emerges as a champion, in the incessant argumentative fight she is engaged in social, economic, political and intellectual fields of life".

Homosexuality in Contemporary Indian Literature: Issues and Challenges (2019) recaptures homosexuality in Indian literature. Apart from mainstream writers on homosexuality like Suniti Namjoshi, Hoshang Merchant, R. Raj Rao and others, this book also explores homosexuality as presented in works of some other writers like Kamala Das, Shobhaa De, Manju Kapur, Mahesh Dattani and others.

Transgender in Indian Context: Rights and Activism (2019) surfaces hardships and struggles of Indian trans persons. Prof. Dr. K. V. Dominic regards this book "a monumental anthology on Indian transgenders".

Woman-Nature Interface: An Ecofeminist Study (2019) discusses woman-nature relationship illustrating how women's issues and environmental concerns intersect and how these intersections are addressed within the framework of ecofeminism. According to Indian poet Jernail Singh Anand, "The book weaves together nature, mother, woman, and the creator of all living beings".

Perspectives on Indian Dalit Literature: Critical Responses (2020) is a general study on Dalit literature. "By centering the voices of Dalit historically silenced by the structures of caste, the anthology challenges mainstream literary paradigms and asserts the rightful place of Dalit literature within both national and global canons of critical inquiry"

Tribal Perspectives in India: Critical Responses (2020) gives space to tribal life and culture. The book discusses tribes like Gonds, Bhils, Great Andamanese, Khasi, Toto, Munda, Bodo, Toda, Kurumban, Domb, Monpa, Malayar, Santhals, Galo, Kodava and many others,

Subaltern Perspectives in Indian Context: Critical Responses (2021) studies "Dalits, Tribes, women, workers, peasants, labourers, and people of many other voiceless communities."

Gender Perspectives in Indian Context: Critical Responses (2021) explores gender role and disparity that arise out of gender discrimination, gender violence and gender binarism. According to P C K Prem, the book "discusses female questions related to love, marriage and relationship, gender discrimination at working places and educational sectors, female foeticide, child sexual abuse, patriarchal control, gendered subjugation and many other glaring issues related with gender."

Indian Diaspora Literature: A Critical Evaluation (2024) presents "the difficulties of living in two different worlds, identity formation, and cultural displacement faced by Indian immigrants." The book presents diasporic themes ranging from voluntary migrations, forcibly displaced partition diaspora, Girmit diaspora and second-generation diasporic dilemmas.

Human-Nature Interface: An Ecocritical Study (2024) explores "the areas covering ecology and environmental disasters inevitably associated to the climate change".

Dalit Autobiography: A Critical Study (2025) is a study on personal narratives of Dalit writers and activists like Sharan Kumar Limbale, Bama, Baby Kamble, Urmila Pawar, and Manoranjan Byapari, .

North East India: Literary and Cultural Perspectives (2025) "not only clears the understanding of Northeast India’s literature but also explores various sides of this region’s culture, like food, education, language, rituals and many other practices". The book "reclaims intellectual territory for Northeast Indian voices that have historically been silenced or misunderstood in national discourse."

Indian Tribal Literature: A Critical Study (2025) "examines both written and non-written forms of tribal literature, irrespective of their modes of expression, while deliberately giving greater space to tribal writers than to non-tribal ones". Tribal writers like Easterine Kire, Mamang Dai, Temsula Ao, Hansda Sowvendra Shekhar, Anuj Lugun are given space in this book. This book is included in PhD course work syllabus of Kolhan University, Chaibasa, Jharkhand.

== Awards ==
In 2018, Dipak Giri was awarded with 'Emerging Editor of the Year' in Vishwabharati Literary Festival at Professor Jayashankar Telangana State Agricultural University, Hyderabad and ‘Mewadev Laurel Award’ by the Contemporary Literary Society of Amlora, Banda, Uttar Pradesh.

== Selected works ==
- New Woman in Indian Literature: From Covert to Overt. Latur: Vishwabharati Research Centre, 2018. (ISBN 978-93-87966-74-1)
- Homosexuality in Contemporary Indian Literature: Issues and Challenges. Kolkata: AABS Publishing House, 2019. (ISBN 978-93-88963-01-5)
- Transgender in Indian Context: Rights and Activism. Kolkata: AABS Publishing House, 2019. (ISBN 978-93-88963-25-1)
- Woman-Nature Interface: An Ecofeminist Study. Kolkata: AABS Publishing House, 2019. (ISBN 978-93-88963-60-2)
- Perspectives on Indian Dalit Literature: Critical Responses. Bilaspur: Booksclinic Publishing, 2020. (ISBN 978-93-89757-71-2)
- Tribal Perspectives in India: Critical Responses. Bilaspur: Booksclinic Publishing, 2020.(ISBN 978-93-90192-47-2)
- Queer Sexualities in Indian Culture: Critical Responses. Bilaspur: Booksclinic Publishing, 2020. (ISBN 978-93-90192-93-9)
- Subaltern Perspectives in Indian Context: Critical Responses. Bilaspur: Booksclinic Publishing, 2021. (ISBN 978-93-90655-92-2)
- Gender Perspectives in Indian Context: Critical Responses. Bilaspur: Booksclinic Publishing, 2021. (ISBN 978-93-90655-84-7)
- Indian Diaspora Literature: A Critical Evaluation. New Delhi: Malik & Sons Publishers & Distributors, 2024. (ISBN 978-93-92459-50-4)
- Human-Nature Interface: An Ecocritical Study. New Delhi: Rudra Publishers & Distributors, 2024. (ISBN 978-93-48421-37-1)
- Dalit Autobiography: A Critical Study. New Delhi: Rudra Publishers & Distributors, 2025. (ISBN 978-93-48421-19-7)
- North East India: Literary and Cultural Perspectives. New Delhi: Malik & Sons Publishers & Distributors, 2025. (ISBN 978-93-92459-60-3)
- Indian Tribal Literature : A Critical Study. New Delhi: Malik & Sons Publishers & Distributors, 2025. (ISBN 978-93-92459-71-9)
- LGBTQ Studies : An Indian Perspective. Delhi: Akhand Publishing House, 2025. (ISBN 978-81-19098-68-2)
- Indian Minorities : A Critical Study. Delhi: Akhand Publishing House, 2026. (ISBN 978-81-996391-8-8)
