= Peter Manson =

Scottish poet

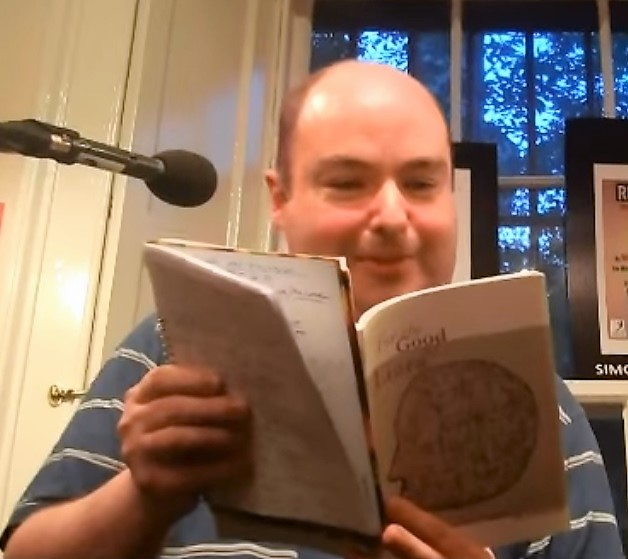
Manson reading from For the Good of Liars in 2012

Peter Manson (born 1969) is a contemporary Scottish poet. His books include Stéphane Mallarmé: The Poems in Verse (Miami University Press 2012), Between Cup and Lip (Miami University Press, 2008), For the Good of Liars (Barque Press 2006), Adjunct: an Undigest (Edinburgh Review 2005), Before and After Mallarmé (Survivors' Press 2005), Two renga (collaborations with the poet Elizabeth James, in the Reality Street Editions 4-pack "Renga+", 2002), Rosebud (Form Books 2002), Birth Windows (Barque Press 1999), me generation (Writers Forum 1997) and iter atur e (Writers Forum 1995). Between 1994 and 1997, he co-edited (with Robin Purves) eight issues of the experimental/modernist poetry journal Object Permanence. In 2001, the imprint was revived as an occasional publisher of pamphlets of innovative poetry, and has so far published work by the poets J. H. Prynne, Keston Sutherland, Fiona Templeton and Andrea Brady. He was the 2005-6 Judith E. Wilson Visiting Fellow in Poetry at Girton College, Cambridge.

An audio CD of Manson reading from "Adjunct: an Undigest" was released by Stem Recordings in 2004.

Adjunct: an Undigest was included in 1001 Books You Must Read Before You Die in 2006.
