= Rebecca Seiferle =

American poet

- Education: BA, University of the State of New York (English & History, Art History minor); MFA, Warren Wilson College
- Occupations: Poet, translator, educator
- Notable work: The Ripped-Out Seam, The Music We Dance To, Bitters, Wild Tongue
- Awards: Bogin Award (Poetry Society of America), Writers' Exchange Award, National Writers Union Prize, Cecil Hemley Memorial Award, Western States Book Award, Pushcart Prize, Lannan Foundation Literary Fellowship

Rebecca Seiferle is an American poet.

== Life ==
Seiferle has a BA from the University of the State of New York with a major in English and History, and a minor in Art History. In 1989, she received her Master of Fine Arts from Warren Wilson College.

She taught English and creative writing for a number of years at San Juan College and has taught at the Provincetown Fine Arts Center, Key West Literary Seminar, Port Townsend Writer's Conference, Gemini Ink, the Stonecoast Master of Fine Arts program She has been poet-in-residence at Brandeis University.

She has regularly reviewed for The Harvard Review and Calyx, and her work has appeared in Partisan Review, Boulevard, Prairie Schooner, The Southern Review, Alaska Quarterly Review, Carolina Quarterly. She is editor of The Drunken Boat.

She lives with her family in Tucson, Arizona.

== Awards ==
Her first book, The Ripped-Out Seam won the Bogin Award from the Poetry Society of America, the Writers' Exchange Award from Poets & Writers, and the National Writers Union Prize, and was a finalist for the Paterson Poetry Prize.

Her second collection, The Music We Dance To (Sheep Meadow 1999) won the 1998 Cecil Hemley Memorial Award from the Poetry Society of America. Her third poetry collection, Bitters, published by Copper Canyon Press, won the Western States Book Award and a Pushcart Prize. Her translation of Vallejo's Trilce was a finalist for the 1992 PenWest Translation Award.

In 2004, she was awarded a literary fellowship from the Lannan Foundation. Rebecca Seiferle, in 2012, was declared the poet laureate of Tucson Arizona.

== Works ==
- THE CUSTOM; HOW TO SPEAK IN BABYLON; DOCUMENTARIES; THE RIPPED-OUT SEAM, wisewomensweb
- "Law of Inertia", pif Magazine
- "The Relic". Ploughshares. Fall 1991. Archived from the original on September 6, 2007.
- "A Broken Crown of Sonnets for My Father's Forehead". The Sonnet Scroll I. The Poetry Porch. 1999.
- "Angel Fire; Widow's Mite; The Price of Books; Seraphim; Proviso". Arbutus. April 2008. Archived from the original on 2009-01-04.
- "Room of Dust", Santa Fe Poetry Broadside, Issue #11, September, 1999
- The Gift, Copper Canyon Press (2001)
- "Wild Tongue", Narrative Magazine, 2008.

=== Poetry ===
- The Ripped-Out Seam. The Sheep Meadow Press. 1993. ISBN 978-1-878818-22-5.
- The Music We Dance To. The Sheep Meadow. 1999. ISBN 978-1-878818-76-8.
- Bitters. Copper Canyon Press. 2001. ISBN 978-1-55659-168-6.
- Wild Tongue. Copper Canyon Press. 2007. ISBN 978-1-55659-262-1.

=== Translations ===
- César Vallejo (2003). The Black Heralds. Copper Canyon Press. ISBN 978-1-55659-199-0.
- Trilce, César Vallejo, Sheep Meadow Press 1992

=== Anthologies ===
- Best American Poetry 2000, Scribner's, ISBN 978-0-684-84281-3
- Susan Aizenberg; Erin Belieu; Jeremy Countryman (2001). The Extraordinary Tide: New Poetry by American Women. Columbia University Press. p. 341. ISBN 978-0-231-11963-4.
- Reversible Monuments: Contemporary Mexican Poetry (Copper Canyon Press 2002), translations of Alfonso D'Aquino and Ernesto Lumbreras
- Saludos: Poemas de Nuevo Mexico, Pennywhistle Press
- New Mexico Poetry Renaissance, edited by Miriam Sagan and Sharon Neiderman, Red Crane Press, ISBN 978-1-878610-41-6
- The Sheep Meadow Anthology.
- Pushcart Prize XXVII, Pushcart Press, 2003, ISBN 978-1-888889-35-2
