= Tony Hoagland =

American poet (1953–2018)

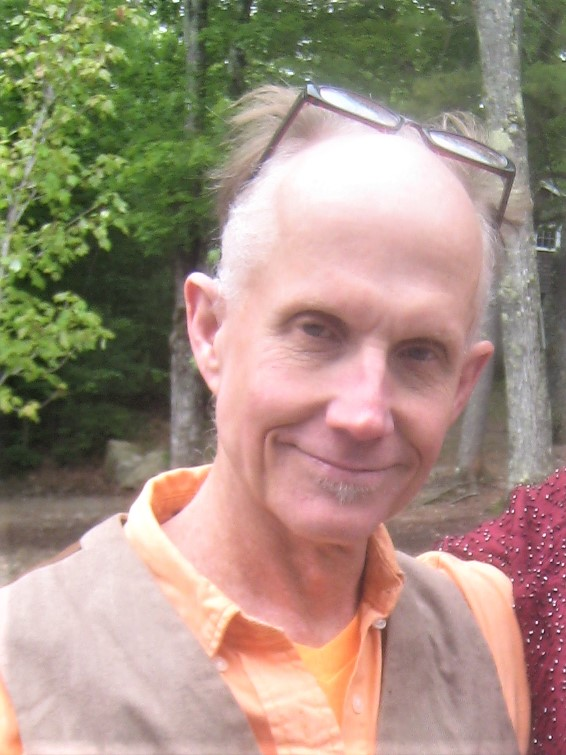
Hoagland in 2013

Anthony Dey Hoagland (November 19, 1953 – October 23, 2018) was an American poet. His poetry collection, What Narcissism Means to Me (2003), was a finalist for the National Book Critics Circle Award. His other honors included two grants from the National Endowment for the Arts, a 2000 Guggenheim Fellowship in Poetry, and a fellowship to the Provincetown Fine Arts Work Center. His poems and criticism have appeared in such publications as Poetry Magazine, Ploughshares, AGNI, Threepenny Review, The Gettysburg Review, Ninth Letter, Southern Indiana Review, American Poetry Review and Harvard Review.

== Biography ==
Hoagland was born in Fort Bragg, North Carolina in 1953. His father was an Army doctor, so Hoagland grew up on various military bases in Hawaii, Alabama, Ethiopia, and Texas. He had an older sister, and a twin brother who died of a drug overdose in high school. He was educated at Williams College, the University of Iowa (B.A.) and the University of Arizona (M.F.A.). According to the novelist Don Lee, Hoagland "attended and dropped out of several colleges, picked apples and cherries in the Northwest, lived in communes, followed the Grateful Dead and became a Buddhist." He taught in the University of Houston creative writing program. He was also on the faculty of the low-residency Warren Wilson College MFA Program for Writers. Hoagland was married to Kathleen Lee, author of fiction, essays and travel writings. They had no children. He died in Santa Fe, New Mexico on October 23, 2018 from pancreatic cancer at the age of 64.

== Literary influences and praise ==
In an interview with Miriam Sagan about his poetic influences, Hoagland said, "if I were going to place myself on some aesthetic graph, my dot would be equidistant between Sharon Olds and Frank O’Hara, between the confessional (where I started) and the social (where I have aimed myself)".

In a 2002 citation regarding Hoagland's award in Literature, The American Academy of Arts and Letters said that "Hoagland's imagination ranges thrillingly across manners, morals, sexual doings, and kinds of speech lyrical and candid, intimate as well as wild."

In 2010, Dwight Garner, a New York Times critic, wrote of Mr. Hoagland: “His erudite comic poems are backloaded with heartache and longing, and they function, emotionally, like improvised explosive devices: The pain comes at you from the cruelest angles, on the sunniest of days.”

== Published works ==
Each year links to its corresponding "[year] in poetry" article:

=== Full-length poetry collections ===
- 2022: Turn Up the Ocean, Minneapolis, MN: Graywolf Press, ISBN 978-1-64445-092-5
- 2018: Priest Turned Therapist Treats Fear of God, Minneapolis, MN: Graywolf Press, ISBN 978-1-55597-807-5
- 2017: Recent Changes in the Vernacular, Espanola, NM: Tres Chicas Books, ISBN 978-1-89300-317-0
- 2015: Application for Release from the Dream, Minneapolis, MN: Graywolf Press, ISBN 978-1-55597-718-4
- 2010: Unincorporated Persons in the Late Honda Dynasty, St. Paul, MN: Graywolf Press, ISBN 978-1-55597-549-4
- 2003: What Narcissism Means to Me, St. Paul, MN: Graywolf Press, ISBN 978-1-55597-386-5
- 1998: Donkey Gospel, St. Paul, MN: Graywolf Press, ISBN 978-1-55597-268-4
- 1992: Sweet Ruin, Madison, WI: University of Wisconsin Press, ISBN 978-0-29913-584-3

=== Chapbooks & Broadsides ===
- 2018: Into The Mystery, Cambridge, MA: Yellow Moon Press
- 2014: Don't Tell Anyone, Venice, CA: Hollyridge Press
- 2009: Little Oceans, Venice, CA: Hollyridge Press
- 2005: Hard Rain, Venice, CA: Hollyridge Press
- 1990: History of Desire, Tucson, AZ: Moon Pony Press
- 1986: Talking to Stay Warm, Minneapolis, MN: Coffee House Press
- 1985: A Change in Plans, Sierra Vista, CA: San Pedro Press

=== Essay collections ===
- 2020: The Art of Voice: Poetic Principles and Practice, (posthumous, with Kay Cosgrove). New York City, NY: W. W. Norton & Company ISBN 978-0-39335-791-2
- 2014: Twenty Poems That Could Save America and Other Essays, St. Paul, MN: Graywolf Press, ISBN 978-1-55597-694-1
- 2006: Real Sofistikashun: Essays on Poetry and Craft, St. Paul, MN: Graywolf Press, ISBN 978-1-55597-455-8

== Honors and awards ==
- 2008 Jackson Poetry Prize awarded by Poets & Writers
- 2005 O. B. Hardison, Jr. Poetry Prize awarded by Folger Shakespeare Library
- 2005 Mark Twain Award awarded by The Poetry Foundation
- 2002 Academy Award in Literature from The American Academy of Arts and Letters
- 2000 Guggenheim Fellowship in Poetry awarded by John Simon Guggenheim Memorial Foundation
- 1997 James Laughlin Award Academy of American Poets for Donkey Gospel
- 1994 NEA Literature Fellowship in Poetry
- 1994 John C. Zacharis First Book Award from Ploughshares for Sweet Ruin
- 1992 Brittingham Prize in Poetry for Sweet Ruin awarded by University of Wisconsin–Madison
- 1987 NEA Literature Fellowship in Poetry

== Controversy ==
On February 4, 2011, Claudia Rankine presented a reading critical of how race is handled in Hoagland's poem "The Change" at the Associated Writing Programs Conference. Hoagland issued an open letter in response.
