= Blacktop Passages =

- Editors: Thomas John Nudi (2013–present); Christopher Cartright (2013–present); Ryan Cheng (2013–present); Zachary Lundgren (2013–present)
- Categories: Poetry; Fiction; Non-Fiction; Interviews; Photography; Art
- Frequency: Quarterly
- Circulation: <1,000
- Publisher: Blacktop Passages
- First issue: June 2013
- Country: United States
- Based in: Orange County, California
- Language: English
- Website: BlacktopPassages.com
- ISSN: 2328-8396

Blacktop Passages is a literary magazine published in the United States since 2013. It is completely non-profit, published by the founding editors with support from public donations.

== History ==
In February 2013, Blacktop Passages established its presence on the internet as a literary journal dedicated to writing focused on the road and themes of traveling. There were early intentions to have two separate submission channels: one for online publication in blog form, the other for a printed journal, in which different content would appear in either medium. Within the first month, the decision to consolidate was made and was the catalyst to open submissions for the first issue, Issue Zero, which would be published both online and in print.

Issue Zero was released on June 1, 2013, for the Summer, with a loose theme of The Southwest. Bettina Gilois was involved in the creation of the issue as guest art curator and also interviewed Miriam Sagan, who had three poems appear in the issue. A piece of micro fiction by Harry Goaz was also featured in the issue.

The print edition of Blacktop Passages is published in limited edition, depending on fundraising, and copies are available to donors, contributors and can be found randomly along the interstate highway system at various rest areas, truck stops and gas stations.

== Editors ==
The first issue, Issue Zero, was edited by Thomas John Nudi, Christopher Cartright, Ryan Cheng, and Zachary Lundgren.

== Distribution ==
The distribution of the print edition of Blacktop Passages is unusual in that it is not found at major retailers, and is also completely free. Copies are hand delivered to stops along the interstate in various states with instructions to, "1. Tweet @BlaktopPassages where you found it, 2. Read, 3. Enjoy, 4. Pass it on, 5. Tweet @BlaktopPassages where you left it". The intention being that when one is done reading, they can continue the distribution of the issue to another destination, perhaps one much further than from its origin, and print issue destinations can then be tracked via Twitter.
