= NSOU =

NSOU can be an abbreviation of:

- Netaji Subhas Open University A State Open University of India.
- National Symphony Orchestra of Ukraine
