= Barque Press =

Barque Press was a London-based publisher of experimental poetry. Founded in 1995 by Andrea Brady and Keston Sutherland. Barque's list includes Andrea Brady, Keston Sutherland, J. H. Prynne, John Tranter, John Wilkinson, Che Qianzi, and Peter Manson.
