= 1001 Video Games You Must Play Before You Die =

2010 video game reference book

- Soft cover edition
- Author: General Editor: Tony Mott; Preface by Peter Molyneux
- Language: English
- Genre: Reference work
- Published: 2010 (Universe Publishing)
- Publication place: United States
- Media type: Print (Hardback)
- Pages: 960 p.
- ISBN: 978-0-7893-2090-2

1001 Video Games You Must Play Before You Die is a video game reference book first published in October 2010. It consists of a list of video games released between 1970 and 2013, arranged chronologically by release date. Each entry in the list is accompanied by a short essay written by a video game critic, with some entries accompanied by screen shots. It was edited by Tony Mott, long-time editor of Edge magazine. The book's preface was written by video game designer Peter Molyneux. It is written in a similar manner to 1001 Albums You Must Hear Before You Die, also published by Universe Publishing.

== By platform ==
Platform	Games
3DO	1
Commodore Amiga	4
Apple II	1
Arcade	124
Commodore 64/ZX Spectrum	1
PDP-10	1
Dreamcast	8
Nintendo DS	42
Flash	1
Game Boy	3
Game Boy Advance	20
Game Boy Color	1
GameCube	28
Intellivision	1
Internet	10
iPad	1
iPhone	14
Atari Jaguar	1
Macintosh	5
Master System	2
Mega Drive	9
Mobile	3
Neo Geo	2
Neo Geo Pocket	1
Neo Geo Pocket Color	1
NES	11
Nintendo 64	23
PC	149
PlayStation	21
PlayStation 2	53
PlayStation 3	44
PlayStation Portable	16
Sega Saturn	7
Super NES	26
ZX Spectrum/Amstrad CPC	1
Atari ST/Mac	1
TurboGrafx-16	1
Unix	1
Atari VCS	3
Wii	35
Xbox	8
Xbox 360	37

== Reception ==
Reception for the book has been generally positive, with critics praising the wealth of knowledge, but criticizing some particular entries. Rick Dakan of PopMatters stated, "Most of the choices seem great to me, and I like that the authors include a lot of smaller, experimental games and some flawed but important titles as well", but disagreed with some entries, such as Army of Two: The 40th Day. While The Austin Chronicle praised the history that the book presented, it criticized the book for its repetitiveness in listing several sequels in certain long-running series, such as the Final Fantasy and Resident Evil series. In his review for Starburst, Callum Shephard said that it was "a good guide" with the proviso that "It's distinctly weaker when it comes to covering handheld gaming and some titles are definitely under-represented."

== See also ==
- 1001 Albums You Must Hear Before You Die
- 1001 Movies You Must See Before You Die
- 1001 Books You Must Read Before You Die
- 1,000 Recordings to Hear Before You Die
