= Paper Tiger (1975 film) =

1975 film directed by Ken Annakin

- Soundtrack album cover
- Directed by: Ken Annakin
- Screenplay by: Jack Davies
- Based on: Paper Tiger (1974 novel) by Jack Davies
- Produced by: Euan Lloyd
- Starring: David Niven; Toshirō Mifune; Hardy Krüger; Kazuhito Ando; Irene Tsu; Jeff Corey; Ivan Desny; Miiko Taka; Ronald Fraser
- Cinematography: John Cabrera
- Edited by: Alan Pattillo
- Music by: Roy Budd
- Production companies: Euan Lloyd Productions; Shalako Enterprises; Maclean & Co.
- Distributed by: Fox-Rank (UK); Avco Embassy (US)
- Release dates: 1 May 1975 (London, premiere); 2 May 1975 (UK); 12 September 1975 (West Germany); 6 November 1975 (US)
- Running time: 99 minutes
- Country: United Kingdom; West Germany; United States
- Languages: English; Japanese

Paper Tiger is a 1975 adventure film directed by Ken Annakin and starring David Niven, Toshiro Mifune, Hardy Krüger and Kazuhito Ando. It was adapted by Jack Davies from his 1974 novel. The plot is about an Englishman (Niven) who is hired as a tutor to the son of a Japanese diplomat (Mifune), using embellished claims of military heroism. His alleged skills are put to the test when he and the son are kidnapped by terrorists. The title comes from a Chinese expression meaning a person who looks powerful or strong but is in fact ineffectual.

The film was an international co-production between British, West German, and American companies, and was shot on-location in Malaysia. It premiered in London on 1 May 1975.

== Plot ==
Englishman Walter Bradbury is an apparently well-educated, decorated ex-military Englishman. He informs strangers he is the son of a viscount, a Member of Parliament, and a nephew of a general, and walks with a limp and cane which he says is due to crashing in the Le Mans 24-hour race. Kagoyama, the Japanese ambassador to the Southeast Asian nation of Kulagong, is attracted to Bradbury's claims of receiving the Military Cross (MC) twice and the Croix de Guerre once during the Second World War and hires Bradbury to tutor to his son, Koichi.

Despite Kagoyama's growing skepticism, Bradbury becomes a trusted companion to the impressionable Koichi. Embellished stories concerning his wartime service dominate the relationship of Bradbury and Koichi, including references to multiple regiments of the British Army, not all of which are real, such as the "Parachute Commandos". Bradbury describes to Koichi how he single-handedly stormed a German position in France in 1944, how he escaped repeatedly from later German internment, and after the war used his cape to help Queen Elizabeth II cross a puddle, a corruption of the Walter Raleigh aid to Queen Elizabeth in the 16th century. The impressionable Koichi is eager to build on Bradbury's stories.

But some painful truths are revealed after Bradbury and Koichi are kidnapped by political terrorists. Kagoyama is forced by the host country to deny the kidnappers' demands, which aim to exchange 65 political prisoners for the lives of Koichi and Bradbury. While imprisoned, an ailing Bradbury reveals to Koichi that his limp is due to polio rather than to wartime service, but nevertheless the two contrive an escape from their hillside prison. Despite Bradbury's frailty, bringing his military record into ever more dubious focus, the capabilities of the terrorists prove insufficient in contrast to the ingenuity of Koichi and Bradbury.

Bradbury and Koichi blacken their faces (but not their clothes) and escape during the night, stealing a car which Bradbury drives recklessly down the zig zag mountain road until they crash. Still pursued by the terrorists, a helicopter is sent in to rescue them.

After their escape, the film culminates with Bradbury's confession to Kagoyama that he was a country schoolmaster during the war. Forgiven for this deception, Koichi is delighted to learn Bradbury will continue as his tutor.

== Cast ==
- David Niven as 'Major' Walter Bradbury
- Toshirō Mifune as Ambassador Kagoyama
- Hardy Krüger as Günther Müller
- Kazuhito Ando as Koichi Kagoyama
- Irene Tsu as Talah
- Ivan Desny as Foreign Minister
- Miiko Taka as Madame Kagoyama
- Jeff Corey as Mr. King
- Patricia Donahue as Mrs. King
- Ronald Fraser as Sgt. Forster
- Kurt Christian as Harok
- Eric Soh as Pathet
- Salleh Ben Joned as Chief Sokono
- Noorkumalasari as Ruby
- Mustapha Maarof as Marco
- Gatz Shariff as Police Chief
- David Khoo as Mok
- Takao Okuyama as Charge d'affaires
- Rainer Penkert as Army Colonel

== Production ==
Though set in a fictional Southeast Asian country, Paper Tiger was filmed mostly in Malaysia, in Kuala Lumpur and Cameron Highlands. Studio shooting took place at Twickenham Studios in London. The film's sets were designed by the art directors Tony Reading, Peter Scharff and Herbert Smith.

Mifune's English dialogue was dubbed by an uncredited David de Keyser.

== Release ==
The film had its premiere on 1 May 1975 at the Odeon Leicester Square in London, attended by the Prince Edward, Duke of Kent and Katharine, Duchess of Kent. It opened to the public the following day.
