= Peter Boxall =

Peter Boxall may refer to:

- Peter Boxall (public servant), Australian public servant and policymaker
- Peter Boxall (literary scholar), British academic and writer
