= 1001 Movies You Must See Before You Die =

2003 book edited by Steven Jay Schneider

- The cover of the 2003 edition with stills from Blade Runner, 2001: A Space Odyssey, Bride of Frankenstein, and more
- Author: Steven Jay Schneider, general editor
- Language: English
- Series: Quintessence Editions, The 1001 Before You Die series
- Subject: Film
- Genre: Non-fiction
- Published: 13 November 2003 (Cassell Illustrated)
- Publication place: United Kingdom
- Media type: Print (Hardcover)
- Pages: 960 (1st edition)
- ISBN: 978-1-84403-044-6
- OCLC: 223768961
- LC Class: PN1998 .A16 2003

1001 Movies You Must See Before You Die is a film reference book edited by Steven Jay Schneider with original essays on each film contributed by over 70 film critics. It is a part of a series designed and produced by Quintessence Editions, a London-based company, and published in English-language versions by Cassell Illustrated (UK), ABC Books (the publishing division of Australian Broadcasting Corporation), and Barron's (US).

== Format ==
Each title is accompanied by a brief synopsis and critique, some with photographs. Presented chronologically, the 15th edition begins with Georges Méliès' A Trip to the Moon from 1902 and ends in 2025 with Oliver Laxe's Sirāt.

== Contributors ==
Jason Solomons, who writes movie columns for The Observer and The Mail on Sunday, wrote the foreword. As of the 5th anniversary edition, over 70 critics contributed essays (of up to 500 words), including: Geoff Andrew, Linda Badley, Kathryn Bergeron, Garrett Chaffin-Quiray, Roumiana Deltcheva, Nezih Erdogan, Jean-Michel Frodon, Chris Fujiwara, Tom Gunning, Ernest Hardy, Aniko Imre, Kyung Hyun Kim, Frank Lafond, Adrian Martin, Kim Newman, Devin Orgeron, Marsha Orgeron, Richard Peña, Margaret Pomeranz, Jonathan Rosenbaum, David Stratton, Adisakdi Tantimedh, Michael Tapper, Sam Umland, Matt Venne, Ginette Vincendeau, Andy Willis, and Josephine Woll.

== Release ==
The first edition was published in 2003. The most recent edition was published on 15 October 2026. Contributors include Adrian Martin, Jonathan Rosenbaum, Richard Peña, David Stratton, and Margaret Pomeranz.

== Reception ==
The book has been popular in Australia, where it was the seventh-best-selling book in the country for a week in April 2004, and it was promoted alongside the presentation of the Australian Broadcasting Corporation's My Favourite Film special.

The book has also been translated and published in different language editions, among them German, French, Swedish, Hungarian, Danish, Turkish, Spanish, Portuguese and Estonian.

== Editions ==
- Schneider, Steven Jay, ed. (2026). 1001 Movies You Must See Before You Die (16th ed.). Sourcebooks. p. 960. ISBN 978-1788406888. OCLC 1601674560. (cover: One Battle After Another)
- Schneider, Steven Jay, ed. (2021). 1001 Movies You Must See Before You Die (15th ed.). Sourcebooks. p. 960. ISBN 978-1438089119. OCLC 1191798232. (cover: Ma Rainey's Black Bottom)
- Schneider, Steven Jay, ed. (2020). 1001 Movies You Must See Before You Die. Quintessence Editions (14th ed.). Hauppauge, New York: Barron's Educational Series. p. 960. ISBN 978-1788402569. OCLC 1191798232. (cover: Joker)
- Schneider, Steven Jay, ed. (2019). 1001 Movies You Must See Before You Die. Quintessence Editions (13th ed.). Hauppauge, New York: Barron's Educational Series. p. 960. ISBN 978-1438050751. OCLC 1089439153. (cover: A Star Is Born)
- Schneider, Steven Jay, ed. (2018). 1001 Movies You Must See Before You Die. Quintessence Editions (12th ed.). Hauppauge, New York: Barron's Educational Series. p. 960. ISBN 978-1788400794. OCLC 1032028634. (cover: Blade Runner 2049)
- Schneider, Steven Jay, ed. (2017). 1001 Movies You Must See Before You Die. Quintessence Editions (11th ed.). Hauppauge, New York: Barron's Educational Series. p. 960. ISBN 978-1438050065. OCLC 1016549609. (cover: Arrival - US / Moonlight - UK)
- Schneider, Steven Jay, ed. (2016). 1001 Movies You Must See Before You Die. Quintessence Editions (10th ed.). Hauppauge, New York: Barron's Educational Series. p. 960. ISBN 978-1844038893. OCLC 967496885. (cover: The Revenant)
- Schneider, Steven Jay, ed. (2015). 1001 Movies You Must See Before You Die. Quintessence Editions (9th ed.). Hauppauge, New York: Barron's Educational Series. p. 960. ISBN 978-1844037339. OCLC 796279948. (cover: Birdman or (The Unexpected Virtue of Ignorance) in the paperback, a poster montage in the hardcover)
- Schneider, Steven Jay, ed. (2014). 1001 Movies You Must See Before You Die. Quintessence Editions (7th ed.). Hauppauge, New York: Barron's Educational Series. p. 960. ISBN 978-1844037339. OCLC 1028461761. (cover: Gravity)
- Schneider, Steven Jay, ed. (2013). 1001 Movies You Must See Before You Die. Quintessence Editions (6th ed.). Hauppauge, New York: Barron's Educational Series. p. 960. ISBN 978-1844037339. OCLC 828076912. (cover: Life of Pi)
- Schneider, Steven Jay, ed. (2012). 1001 Movies You Must See Before You Die. Quintessence Editions (5th ed.). Hauppauge, New York: Barron's Educational Series. p. 960. ISBN 978-1844037339. OCLC 796279948. (cover: Tinker Tailor Soldier Spy)
- Schneider, Steven Jay, ed. (2011). 1001 Movies You Must See Before You Die. Quintessence Editions (4th ed.). Hauppauge, New York: Barron's Educational Series. p. 960. ISBN 978-0-7641-6422-4. OCLC 729687278. (cover: Black Swan – US / Inception – UK)
- Schneider, Steven Jay, ed. (2010). 1001 Movies You Must See Before You Die. Quintessence Editions (Updated 3rd ed.). Hauppauge, New York: Barron's Educational Series. p. 960. ISBN 978-1-84403-680-6. OCLC 645677397. (cover: Avatar)
- Schneider, Steven Jay, ed. (2009). 1001 Movies You Must See Before You Die. Quintessence Editions (Updated 3rd ed.). Hauppauge, New York: Barron's Educational Series. p. 960. ISBN 978-1-84403-680-6. OCLC 403468162. (cover: The Dark Knight)
- Schneider, Steven Jay, ed. (2008). 1001 Movies You Must See Before You Die. Quintessence Editions (5th Anniversary/3rd ed.). Hauppauge, New York: Barron's Educational Series. p. 960. ISBN 978-0-7641-6151-3. OCLC 213305397. (cover: Indiana Jones and the Temple of Doom)
- Schneider, Steven Jay, ed. (2007). 1001 Movies You Must See Before You Die. Quintessence Editions (Updated 2nd ed.). Hauppauge, New York: Barron's Educational Series. p. 960. ISBN 978-0-7641-5907-7. OCLC 271666651. (cover: Return of the Jedi)
- Schneider, Steven Jay, ed. (2005). 1001 Movies You Must See Before You Die. Quintessence Editions (2nd ed.). Cassell Illustrated/Quintet Books, London, UK: Barron's Educational Series. p. 960. ISBN 978-0-7641-5907-7. OCLC 225055129. (cover: The Shining)
- Schneider, Steven Jay, ed. (2003). 1001 Movies You Must See Before You Die (1st ed.). London: Cassell Illustrated. p. 960. ISBN 978-1-8440-3044-6. OCLC 223768961. (cover: Get Carter)
- Schneider, Steven Jay, ed. (2003). 1001 Movies You Must See Before You Die. Quintessence Editions (1st ed.). Hauppauge, New York: Barron's Educational Series. p. 960. ISBN 978-0-7641-5701-1. OCLC 717072823. (cover: Psycho / Pulp Fiction)
- Schneider, Steven Jay, ed. (2003). 1001 Movies You Must See Before You Die. Quintessence Editions. Sydney: ABC Books for Australian Broadcasting Corp. p. 960. ISBN 978-0-7333-1315-8. OCLC 62539484. (cover: Psycho)

Source: WorldCat

== See also ==
- List of films voted the best
- 1001 Albums You Must Hear Before You Die
- 1001 Books You Must Read Before You Die
- 1001 Children's Books You Must Read Before You Grow Up
- 1001 Video Games You Must Play Before You Die
- 1,000 Recordings to Hear Before You Die
