= Textual Practice =

- Discipline: Literature
- Language: English
- Edited by: Peter Boxall

Publication details
- History: 1987-present
- Publisher: Routledge
- Frequency: Monthly

Standard abbreviations
- ISO 4: Textual Pract.

Indexing
- ISSN: 0950-236X (print); 1470-1308 (web)
- LCCN: 94640393
- OCLC no.: 16744351

Links
- Journal homepage; Online archive

Textual Practice is a monthly peer-reviewed academic journal covering radical literary studies. The editor-in-chief is Peter Boxall (Goldsmiths' Professor of English Literature at the University of Oxford). It was established in 1987 by Methuen and is currently published by Routledge, who absorbed Methuen's academic publishing operations.

== Abstracting and indexing ==
The journal is abstracted and indexed in the Arts and Humanities Citation Index and the MLA International Bibliography.
