= Guild of Indian English Writers Editors and Critics =

GIEWEC (Guild of Indian English Writers Editors and Critics)
- Logo of GIEWEC
- Established: 2010
- President: Dr. Jaydeep Sarangi, Kolkata
- Location: Thodupuzha, Kerala, India
- Website: http://www.giewecindia.com

Guild of Indian English Writers Editors and Critics is a literary forum of Indian writers in English. It was established on 24 September 2010 at Thodupuzha, Kerala, India. It was registered on 13 October 2010 and its Head Office is functioning at the residence of the Secretary, Dr. K. V. Dominic at Thodupuzha, Kerala.Renowned academician and award-winning author Dr Jaydeep Sarangi, Principal of New Alipore College, Kolkata is the president now. The guild honoured Literary legends, Shri Jayanta Mahapatra and Shri Ashokamitran and Justice Shri V. R. Krishna Iyer in the literary festivals organised by the guild.

== Objectives ==
It is a non-profit making institution aimed at promoting Indian Literature in English through the members' creative and critical writings and by editing and publishing books and journals. The chief objectives of the Guild are: to promote Indian Literature in English, to exchange creative writings between nations and to conduct annual conferences and literary festivals.

== Journal ==
The Guild is publishing an international biannual refereed journal entitled Writers Editors Critics (WEC) (ISSN 2231-198X) which is approved by University Grants Commission, Delhi, India and abstracted and indexed by EBSCO Information Services, United States for worldwide reference. The issues come out in March and September. The journal is edited by Dr. K. V. Dominic.

== Seminar and literary festivals ==
The guild conducted several seminars and literary festivals in collaboration with different esteemed institutions in India.

- Reimaging Text: English Studies and Digital Humanities (2017) in collaboration with Maniben Nanavati Women's College, Mumbai
- Multiculturalism, Human Values and Language and Literature (2016)in collaboration with Jagarlamudi Kuppuswamy Chowdary College, Guntur.
- Environmental Literature and Beyond (2015)in collaboration with C. M. S. College, Kottyam.
- Indian Literature in English: New Directions, Newer Possibilities (2014)in collaboration with Pondicherry University.
- Contemporary Indian Literature in English: Dimensions and Directions (2012)in collaboration with K.J. Somayya college of Arts and Commerce, Mumbai.
- Contemporary Indian English Poetry: Dimensions and Directions (2011)in collaboration with St. Teresa's College, Ernakulam.

== Executive committee ==
- Prof. Jaydeep Sarangi (Kolkata) – President
- Dr. K. V. Dominic (Kerala) – Secretary
- Prof. P. Gopichand (Andhra Pradesh) – Vice-President
- Dr. JoJi John Panicker (Kerala) – Joint Secretary
- Dr. S. Kumaran (Tamil Nadu) – Treasurer
- Dr. Poonam Sahay (Jharkhand) – Ex. Com. Member
- Dr. Ketaki Datta (Kolkata) – Ex. Com. Member
- Dr. S. Ayyappa Raja (Tamil Nadu) -Ex. Com. Member
- Dr. Pamela Jeyaraju (Puducherry) -Ex. Com. Member
- Prof. P. Nagasuseela (Andhra Pradesh) -Ex. Com. Member
- Prof. Sibasis Jana (West Bengal) -Ex. Com. Member
