= Charles Lambert (author) =

English novelist and short-story writer

Charles Lambert (born October 1953) is an English novelist and short-story writer.

== Biography ==
Charles Lambert was born in October 1953 in Lichfield, England. He went to a number of schools in central England before winning a scholarship to Emmanuel College, Cambridge, to read English in 1972. During his time at Cambridge, he was involved with Blue Room, a poetry society founded by John Wilkinson and Charlie Bulbeck. His first publication, Of Western Limits, was a poetic collaboration with John Wilkinson following a walking holiday in Scotland.

In 1976 he moved to Milan and, apart from brief spells in Ireland, Portugal and London, he has lived and worked in Italy since then. His occupations have included academic translator, university language teacher, journalist and editor for international organizations.

== Fiction ==
His first novel, Little Monsters, a Good Housekeeping selection, was published in 2008, the same year as his collection of prize-winning stories, The Scent of Cinnamon and Other Stories; the title story won an O. Henry Prize.

Any Human Face, his second novel and the first in a trilogy set in modern-day Rome, was welcomed as "a sophisticated literary thriller" by The Guardian and as "a wonderful book, beautifully written" by Eurocrime.co.uk., while for The Daily Telegraph it is "a slow-burning, beautifully written crime story that brings to life the Rome that tourists don’t see – luckily for them".

The second novel in the trilogy, The View from the Tower, came out in February 2014. Mystery Scene called it "a superb, deeply thought-out book". For Crime Review it was "intriguing and exquisitely written". The novel was subsequently published in Italian, with the title Occasioni di Morte.

Later that year, Lambert published a memoir/fictional autobiography composed of 241 120-word sections and entitled With a Zero at its Heart. Selected as one of the best books of the year by the Guardian, which described the book as "elegantly written and with considerable emotional clout…poetic, tender and funny", the cover and page design were the work of Vaughan Oliver.

The Children’s Home was published in 2016. Described by The New York Times as "disquieting", the novel received starred reviews from Kirkus Reviews and Booklist, which called it "a magical, mesmerizing tale about the courage it takes to confront the unknown". The novel has been translated into French as La Maison des Enfants. This was followed in 2017 by the publication of Two Dark Tales, praised by the Sunday Express as "odd, disturbing and original". He has also published a novella, The Slave House, based on his experiences in post-war Portugal.

Prodigal, described by its publisher as an "atypical coming-of-age tale", appeared in August 2018. It was shortlisted for the first Polari Prize in 2019.

The Bone Flower, published in September 2022, was described by the San Francisco Book Review as a "classy ghost story, with just the right amount of atmosphere and subtle scares." Birthright, a psychological thriller set in Rome, appeared in spring 2023.

== Non-fiction ==
Lambert's non-fictional work includes recollections of the poets Jonathan Williams and Dom Sylvester Houédard; critical essays on gay poetry; and, for Critical Quarterly, disability in George R. R. Martin's cycle, A Song of Ice and Fire, in an essay entitled "A tender spot in my heart".
