= Keston Sutherland =

British poet (born 1976)

- Occupations: poet, essayist, professor
- Writing career
- Language: English
- Period: 1990s-present
- Genre: Experimental literature
- Literary movement: Late modernism

Keston M. Sutherland is a British poet, and Professor of Poetics at the University of Sussex. He was the editor of the poetics and critical theory journal QUID and is co-editor (with Andrea Brady) of Barque Press. His poetry has been compared to J. H. Prynne, John Wilkinson, and Drew Milne. His poem Hot White Andy was first published in the United States in a special issue of Chicago Review.

== Bibliography ==
- 20 Poems (with Andrea Brady), Barque Press, 1995
- Have Wishly, Barque Press, 1995
- Prag, Barque Press, 1996
- Vac Stucco, Barque Press, 1996
- Lidia, Barque Press, 1996
- So Sung Visitor Soh, Barque Press, 1996
- Girls at Trusion, Barque Press, 1997
- Hate’s Clitoris and Other Poems, Barque Press, 1997
- At The Motel Partial Opportunity, Barque Press, 1998
- Pine (with John Kinsella), Folio, 1998
- Mincemeat Seesaw, Barque Press, 1999
- Scratchcard Sally-Ann, Nominative Press Collective, 1999
- Bar Zero, Barque Press, 2000
- Antifreeze, Barque Press, 2002
- The Rictus Flag, Object Permanence, 2003
- Neutrality, Barque Press, 2004
- Neocosis, Barque Press, 2005
- Hot White Andy, Barque Press, 2007
- Stress Position, Barque Press, 2009
- The Stats on Infinity, Crater, 2010
- Stupefaction: a Radical Anatomy of Phantoms, Seagull Books, 2011
- The Odes to TL61P, Enitharmon, 2013
- Poetical Works 1999-2015, Enitharmon, 2015
- Whither Russia, Barque Press, 2017
- Scherzos Benjyosos, The Last Books, 2020
- Meditations, The Last Books, 2024
- Complete Critical Prose of J.H. Prynne, forthcoming [Editor]
