= Domb =

Domb is a surname. Notable people with this surname include:

- Allan Domb (born 1955), American real estate developer and politician
- Asi Domb (born 1974), Israeli football player and manager
- Cyril Domb (1920–2012), British-Israeli theoretical physicist
- Emma Domb (c. 1896 – 1988), American fashion designer
- Mindy Domb, American politician
