= Malachi Edwin Vethamani =

Malaysian writer

- Born: 8 July 1955 (age 71); Kuala Lumpur, Malaysia
- Education: University of Nottingham
- Website: malachiedwinvethamani.com

Malachi Edwin Vethamani is a Malaysian-born Indian poet, fictionist, editor, bibliographer, academic, and critic. He has been a vocal advocate for literary expression, reflecting the multicultural, multilingual, and often marginalised voices within Malaysia. His work frequently explores themes of identity, sexuality, love, loss, displacement, and cultural belonging, and he is especially noted for foregrounding queer male perspectives in a Malaysian context—an area that has traditionally remained underrepresented.

== Biography ==
Malachi Edwin Vethamani (b. 8 July 1955) was born in Brickfields, Kuala Lumpur, Malaysia. He has two sons, Vincent Jeremiah Edwin and Julian Matthew Edwin.

He received his early education in Kuala Lumpur at Methodist Boys' Primary School and continued at Methodist Boys' Secondary School. He completed his Higher School Certificate at Vanto Academy in Petaling Jaya. His studies at the University of Malaya saw him obtain a Diploma in Education (TESL), a Bachelor of Arts (Hons.) in English Literature, and a Master of Education in Teaching English as a Second Language (TESL). In 1993, he secured a Chevening Scholarship and completed his doctorate in literature in English from the University of Nottingham, UK.

The entry into his teaching career in 1979 was accidental when he took a chance to apply for a teaching vacancy in MARA Junior Science College (MRSM) Pengkalan Chepa as an English teacher and discovered that he loved it. After a 26-year career as a lecturer at Universiti Putra Malaysia, he went on to serve as the founding dean of Wawasan Open University School of Education, Languages and Communication and Taylor's University School of Education in 2009 and 2011, respectively. He was conferred the title Emeritus Professor by the University of Nottingham upon his retirement in January 2021.

Until 2016, Vethamani was better known in academic circles as a critic and bibliographer, as well as an internationally recognised teacher trainer and expert on Malaysian literature in English. Although now seen as a prolific writer of short stories and poems, he admitted that "for many years, I did not have the confidence in seeing my creative work published".

== Poems ==
During the 1990s, Vethamani's poetry explored the themes of relationships and mixed marriages. He has edited six volumes of poetry, most recent titles being Contours of Him (Hawakal Press, 2025) and Malaysian Places and Spaces (Maya Press, 2024). Vethamani has also published five poetry collections, Rambutan Kisses (Maya Press, 2022), The Seven O'clock Tree (Maya Press, 2022), Love and Loss (Maya Press, 2017), Life Happens (Maya Press, 2017), and Complicated Lives (Maya Press, 2016). His poems have been described as "very intimate and confessional".

In 2022, Ismail S. Talib, in The Journal of Commonwealth Literature (2023), stated that “the most prominent figure in Malaysian poetry was Malachi Edwin Vethamani, who is, without doubt, one of the leading English-language poets in Malaysia.”

=== Complicated Lives (2016) ===
The debut collection featured 82 poems addressing various issues, particularly those concerning love and loss. Some of the work is based on Vethamani's memories of living in Brickfields. Wong Phui Nam remarked that people might find the poems in the collection to be "difficult poems", given the deceptive "surface simplicity that ...obscures... the deeply felt range of complex emotions underneath". Vethamani was likened to "classical Chinese poets", where a common theme in the Chinese poets’ writings is "that human life is all too brief, and life comes all too soon to an end", and he added that Vethamani showed an "unexpected affinity with Buddhist thought" with regard to the idea of non-attachment.

=== Life Happens (2017) ===
This collection has been characterised as full of "honesty, humour, and humanity" and alternate between "bald poetry of statements to poems of lyrical grace". He was praised for exploring important issues such as "the complications and fractures of longing, heartbreak, exile and sexuality in a Malay-Tamil society" and noted that "simplicity of language and phrase making are the hallmarks of Malachi Edwin Vethamani's poetry".

=== Malchin Testament: Malaysian Poems (2017) ===
Vethamani edited a volume of Malaysian poems entitled Malchin Testament: Malaysian Poems (Maya Press, Kuala Lumpur: 2017) which spans a period of 60 years, deemed to be "the most important collection of verse published thus far in this new millennium in Malaysia", since there has not been another comprehensive compilation of Malaysian verse after Lloyd Fernando's anthology The Second Tongue (1976). Malchin Testament was praised for taking this into account and including all the important poets who wrote before the 1990s, deemed as "the true predecessors of today's Malaysian poetry, such as Ee Tiang Hong, Wong Phui Nam, Siew-Yue Killingley, Shirley Geok-Lin Lim, Muhammad Haji Salleh, Hilary Tham and Salleh Ben Joned".

The collection includes all the early practitioners of verse starting from around the birth of Malaysia in 1963, although Wong Phui Nam early poems were already written in the decade prior to that. The “Malchin Testament” of the title of the anthology was a hat-tip to a poem of the same name by poet Salleh Ben Joned, which poked fun at the possibilities of Malaysian English slang and idiom being used in the writing of local poems and "democratising the language altogether". Newer, emerging voices were also fairly represented although the reviewer lamented the absence of Nicholas Wong (or Zhou Sivan) in the anthology.

=== Malaysian Millennial Voices (2021) ===
This book features 69 poems from 37 poets under the age of 35 and "captures the voices of the young and the restless". Most of the poems were written in free verse, and the language used was "contemporary, youthful and often conversational", with a "distinct flavour of Malaysian English.” The poems touch on themes that range from everyday concerns to identity, growing up, dealing with loss of parents and grandparents, and political awareness.

== Short stories ==
His stories have been published in Queer Southeast Asia Literary Journal (2020), Creative Flight Literary Journal (2020), Business Mirror (2018), and Lakeview International Journal of Literature and Arts (2017).

=== Coitus Interruptus and Other Stories (2018) ===
The debut collection was highly praised for “clever and ardent writings which mirrors the realities of everyday life of Malaysian everymen... where the larger questions of existence are explored”. The female characters "resist societal oppressive norms by not performing or bowing to the roles and norms expected of them". In this collection, Vethamani's characters are often, although not exclusively, Malaysian Indians dealing with matters of personal freedom and choice. Some of his most memorable male characters are gay men who have to navigate their lives in a society in which homosexuality remains taboo, where Vethamani presents "these vignettes of Malaysian life just as their characters might inhabit them, with candour and directness". The tone of the stories were said to be "serious, often explicit, and at times light-hearted and humourous [sic]" and the book showed that not only has Vethamani "proven that he is an excellent storyteller, but [he] has inadvertently been the author of one of the few Malaysian works in English that directly deal with queer experiences and women's sexuality".

=== Ronggeng-Ronggeng: Malaysian Short Stories (2020) ===
Vethamani edited Ronggeng-Ronggeng, an anthology of 28 short stories written between 1959 and 2018. The collection offers a breadth of stories; from the newness of an independent and multicultural nation to stories which express "smaller, more intimate realities". It comprises a variety of genres, from social politics, social realism, to horror, and the supernatural. A common thread running through the collection is the theme of belonging, "whether in terms of nation, family or society". The contributing authors were diverse in terms of the period as well as ethnicity and background, with selections from Zen Cho, Kassim Ahmad, K.S Maniam and Awang Kedua, amongst others.

== Other publications ==
Vethamani is the founding editor of Men Matters Online Journal. It is a peer-reviewed international online journal, "devoted to topics concerning men, masculinity, gender, culture, politics, sexuality and challenging men's roles in the traditional patriarchal society", and is published twice a year in June and December.

He published A Bibliography of Malaysian Literature in English (Maya Press, Kuala Lumpur) in 2015. Vethamani acknowledged Professor Lloyd Fernando as a mentor, role model and friend, and much of his early research on the bibliography of Malaysian literature was done thanks to the access to the professor's personal library at home.

== Awards ==
His awards include:

- Complicated Lives and Malaysian Millennial Voices nominated for the National Book Award 2022 (English Language) by the Malaysian Publishers Association
- “Athai’s Blessings” won Second Prize in the Jasmina Award 2021 for poetry
- Lockdown, a collaborative play, won five awards at the 2021 Short + Sweet Festival organised by KLPac: “Best Director,” “Best Actor (Male),” “Best Actor (Female),” “Audience’s Choice Award,” and “Mercedes-Benz Award for Creative Excellence”
- Malchin Testament: Malaysian Poems won the Best English Language Book Award (English Category) at the inaugural Anugerah Buku Malaysia 2020 Awards
- Excellence in Teaching and Learning Award (2018/2019)
- Special Excellence Award, Alumni Laureate Award (2020) and the Vice-Chancellor's Achievement Medal (2019), from the University of Nottingham
- Asian Education Leadership Award (2013) conferred by World Education Congress, Mumbai, India
- Malaysian English Language Teaching Association (MELTA) Special Award (2013)
- Recipient of the Fulbright Scholarship (2000)
- Chevening Award, which was a three-year scholarship for doctoral studies at the University of Nottingham (1993 to 1996)

The Malaysian English Language Teaching Association named the MELTA-Malachi Edwin Creative Teacher Award after him
