= Harry Goaz =

American actor

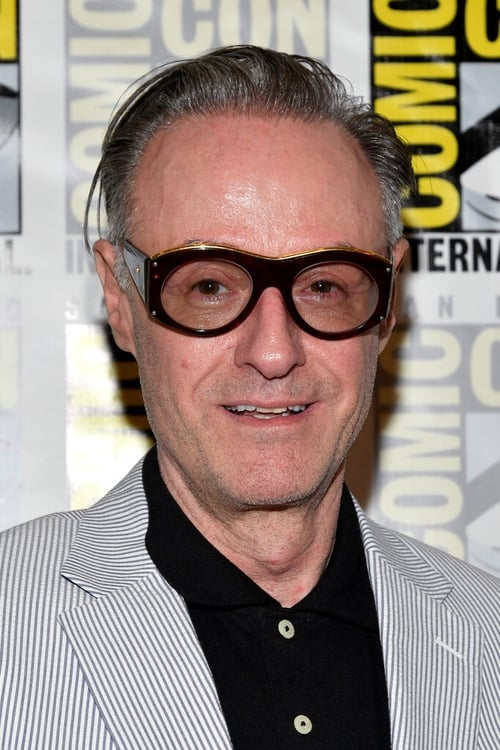
- Goaz in 2012
- Born: 1960 or 1961 (age 65–66); North Carolina, U.S.
- Education: University of Texas at Austin
- Occupation: Actor
- Years active: 1989–present
- Known for: Twin Peaks

Harry Goaz (born 1960 or 1961) is an American actor best known for his roles as Deputy Andy Brennan on the television series, Twin Peaks (1990–1991, 2017), and as Sgt. Knight on the NBC television series, Eerie, Indiana (1991–1992).

== Early life and education ==
Goaz was born in North Carolina and grew up in Beaumont, Texas. He attended the University of Texas at Austin and studied acting under William Traylor at the Loft Studio in Los Angeles, California.

== Career ==
Goaz first met David Lynch while driving him to a memorial tribute to Roy Orbison, and Lynch later cast him for the role of Deputy Andy Brennan in the television series Twin Peaks. Goaz followed Twin Peaks with Eerie, Indiana, a paranormal television show created by Joe Dante. Goaz has also taken roles in independent films, such as Steven Soderbergh's The Underneath.

His piece of micro-fiction, "Donald's Holy Head", was published in Blacktop Passages in 2013.

== Filmography ==
=== Film ===
Year	Title	Role	Notes
1992	Twin Peaks: Fire Walk with Me	Deputy Andy Brennan	Scenes deleted
1995	The Underneath	Guard Casey	
2005	Deadroom	Layton	
2009	St. Nick	Detective	
2010	Earthling	Thomas Head	
2014	Twin Peaks: The Missing Pieces	Deputy Andy Brennan	

=== Television ===
Year	Title	Role	Notes
1989–1991	Twin Peaks	Deputy Andy Brennan	26 episodes
1991–1992	Eerie, Indiana	Sgt. Knight	5 episodes
2017	Twin Peaks	Deputy Andy Brennan	9 episodes
