= John Wilkinson (poet) =

English poet

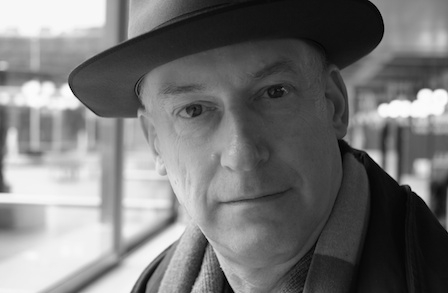
- John Wilkinson

John Lawton Wilkinson (born 1953) is a contemporary English poet.

From 1972 to 1975, he studied English at Jesus College, Cambridge, United Kingdom, where he founded, with Charlie Bulbeck and Charles Lambert, the Blue Room, a society devoted to the propagation of poetry and the other fine arts.

His first publication, Of Western Limit (a collaboration with Charles Lambert), appeared in 1974, the year in which Wilkinson won the Chancellor's Medal for Poetry. He has published seven major collections of verse as well as critical articles on British and American poetry, some of which were collected in The Lyric Touch (2007).

His most recent collections are Reckitt's Blue (2013), Down to Earth (2008), Lake Shore Drive (2006), Contrivances (2003) and Effigies against the Light (2001); a chapbook titled Iphigenia appeared in 2004, and his 1986 collection, Proud Flesh, was re-issued in 2005 with an introduction by Drew Milne. In 1992, his work "Hid Lip" appeared alongside works by Stephen Rodefer and Rod Mengham in a volume called Writing Out of Character, published by Street Editions. Schedule of Unrest: Selected Poems appeared in 2014.

John Wilkinson has held a Frank Knox Fellowship at Harvard University, and was a Fulbright Distinguished Scholar in 2003/04 at the Nathan S. Kline Institute. From 2007/08 he was Carl H. Pforzheimer Fellow at the National Humanities Center in North Carolina. From 2005 to 2010 he was Writer in Residence and thereafter Research Professor in the Department of English at the University of Notre Dame. In 2010 he moved to the University of Chicago as Professor of Practice of the Arts. He is married to the literary critic Maud Ellmann.
