= Emma Domb =

American fashion designer

- Born: Emma Hymson; 1896 or 1897; Louisville, Kentucky, U.S.
- Died: February 27, 1988; Los Altos, California, U.S.
- Other name: Emma Vigdor
- Labels: Emma Domb; Domb Manufacturing Company

Emma Domb (c.1896–1988) was an American fashion designer who created feminine clothes for all occasions with a focus on affordability. Her company, the Domb Manufacturing Company, produced bridal gowns and prom dresses from 1939 until 1980. It also supplied gowns for contestants in the Miss America pageant for decades.

== Life ==
Born to Polish parents in Louisville, Kentucky, in 1896 or 1897, Emma Domb was married to an Austrian or Polish man named Leo Domb, and had a daughter, Lorraine Domb (b. 1918, deceased), with whom she filed for residency in San Francisco with in 1935 after moving there in 1920. Domb died on February 27, 1988, at Pilgrim Haven Convalescent Hospital in Los Altos, California. She was 95.

== Work ==
Starting in 1939, she operated San Francisco based Domb Manufacturing Company under the label name Emma Domb with her daughter. The "Lorrie Deb" division, was named after her daughter, operated into 1986 despite manufacturing being halted at the plant in 1974 due to Emma's illness and company dissolution in 1980. Emma Domb's work ranged from baby clothes to junior debutante and prom dresses (as was the case in the 1950s launched "Party Lines by Domb" line) to ball and wedding gowns. In 1951, two million yards of fabric were reported to be cut for her dresses in a year, and her company was reported to have 8000 retail stores. In 1948, her company was said to be at an income of two million dollars a year, and two pieces of her work were listed as selling roughly $60 and $100 each in the year 1965.

Domb was one of the first designers to incorporate new fabrics such as nylon and rayon into her work, which she used alongside luxury fabrics such as lace, silk, and satin. Despite being based on the west coast in San Francisco, her work was modeled and sold as far north in the United States as Alaska and as far east as Washington, D.C. and Mississippi.

Her work was shown at The Fashion Flight, a 1974 fashion show in Paris which was the first all-American fashion show held in Europe. Her work was shown under San Francisco's "Fashion Premiere in Paris" and was sponsored by the San Francisco Manufacturers and Wholesalers Association as well as the City of San Francisco, and showcased her advance spring fashions.

Domb worked with Hollywood celebrities and political figures such as Nevada state First Lady Jackalyn Laxalt. Her work frequently appeared in Miss America pageants in the 1950s and 1960s. Stylist Patricia Field utilized Emma Domb dresses in the series Sex and the City and in the movie.

Her work was exhibited in magazines Harper's Bazaar and Vogue, as well as a cover of Look and a feature in Brides.

Domb's work is considered to be valuable by vintage wedding dress collectors. Her work is preserved at the Science History Institute, the Nevada State Library Archives and Public Records, the North Dakota Heritage Center, and the Costume Collection of the Fashion Merchandising and Management Program at California State University, Sacramento, as well as the repository at the SCAD Museum of Art.

== Gallery ==
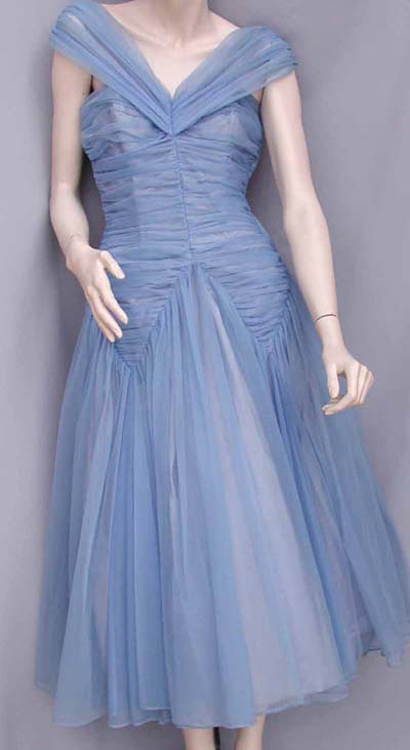
Blue Nylon fabric ball gown by Emma Domb, Science History Institute

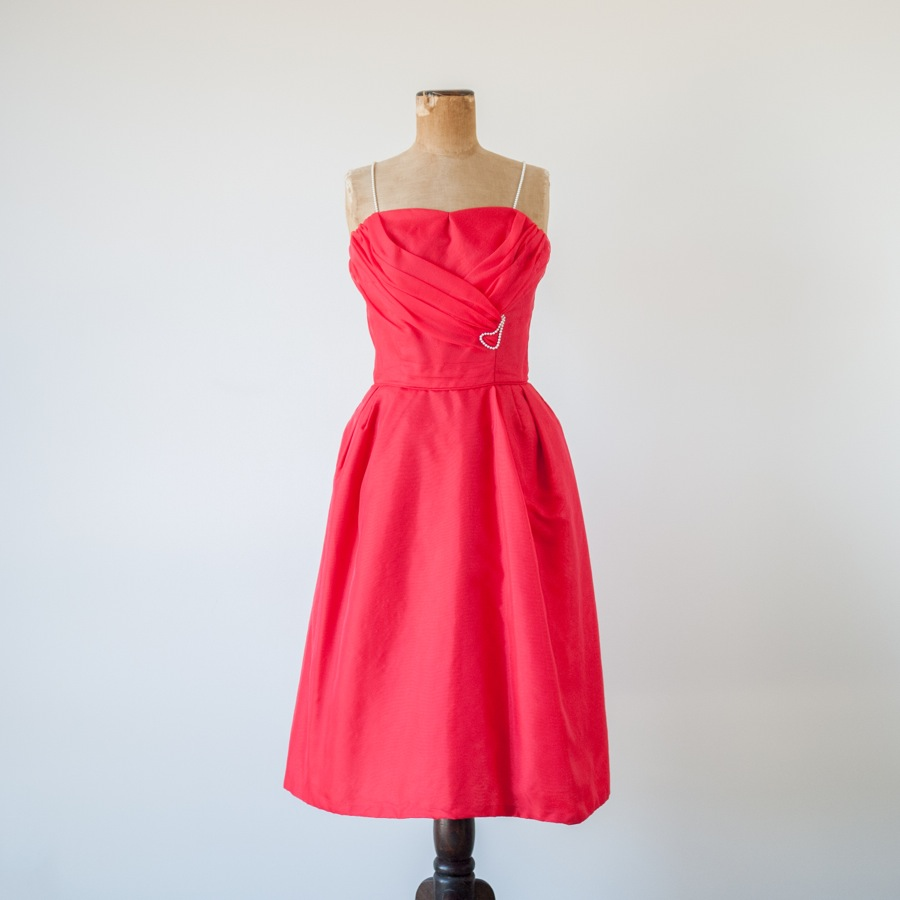
Red chiffon dress by Emma Domb
