= Aparna Lanjewar Bose =

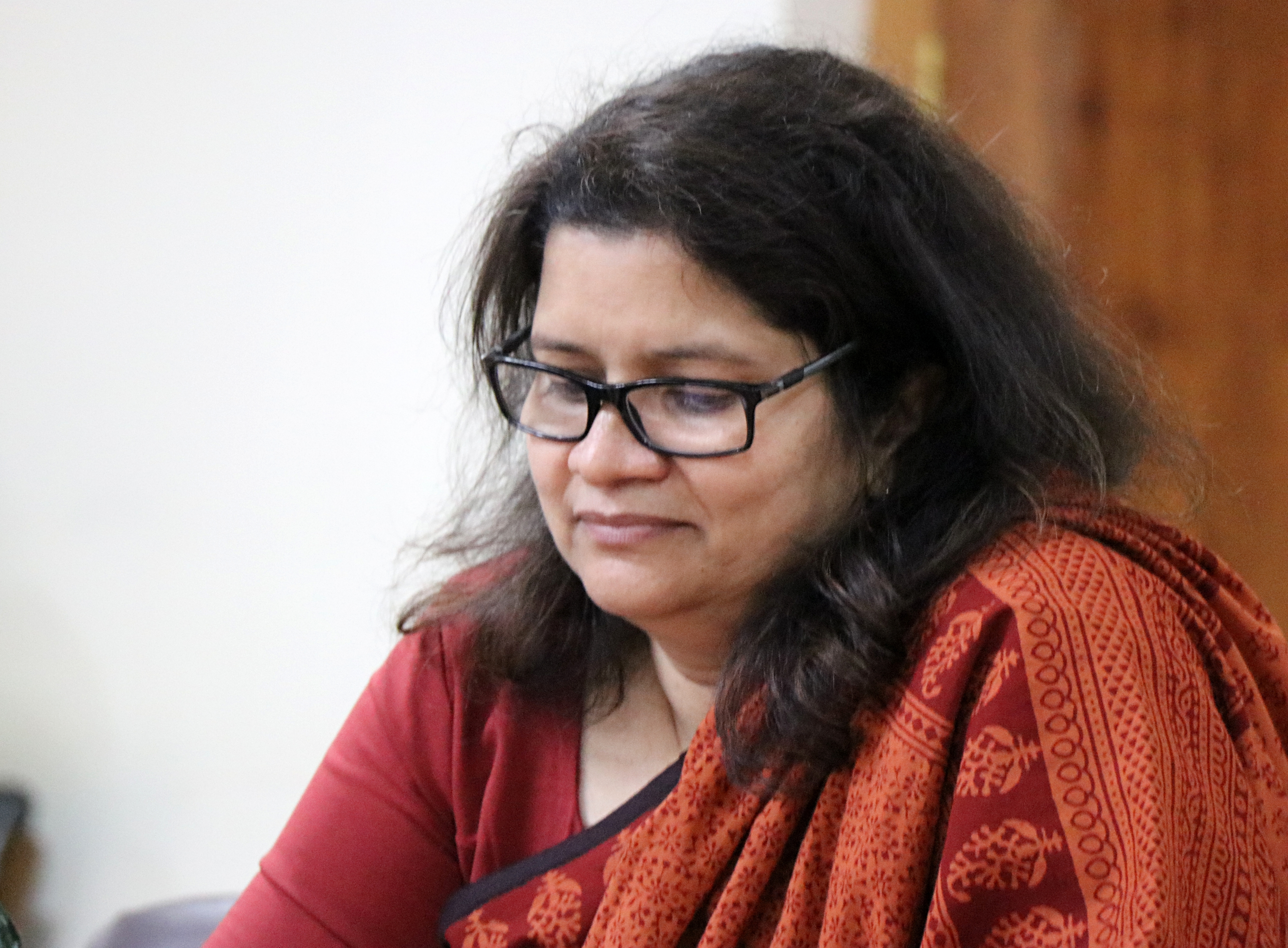
Professor Aparna Lanjewar Bose at the Young Researchers' Conference, EFLU, Hyderabad (2023).

Aparna Lanjewar Bose is an Indian trilingual writer, poet, critic, and translator. She is currently working at The English and Foreign Languages University, Hyderabad as an associate professor, at the School of Literary Studies. She is an author of several books and articles in Marathi and English.

== Education ==
Bose did her bachelor's degree in English literature and master's degree in English from University of Nagpur. She also did her PhD from University of Nagpur. She also holds an LLB from Dr. Babasaheb Ambedkar Law College, Nagpur.

== Career ==
She taught at the University of Nagpur (1995–2001), the PGTD of English, Mumbai University (2001–2010) before joining English and Foreign Languages University, Hyderabad, in 2010. She is currently professor in the School of Literary Studies.

== Writings ==
Besides publishing several articles, papers, reviews, poems and translations in journals, anthologies and books, she published 2 books of poetry, titled In the Days of Cages and Kuch Yu Bhi (Nagpur: Sanket Prakashan, 2008) A book of Poetry translations, titled Red Slogans on the Green Grass (Pune: Scion Publication, 2009), besides compiling and editing two books on Marathi short stories and poetry respectively titled Pakshin Ani Chakravyuh (Pune : Sugava Prakashan, 2014) and Wadal Uthanaar Aahey ( Mumbai: Lokwangmay Gruh, 2018). She has edited & introduced a collection of critical essays titled Writing Gender Writings Self: Memory, Memoir and Autobiography. Her forthcoming publications include a collection of Marathi Dalit and Tribal women poetry in translations titled Silenced Speak. She was part of the Sahitya Akademi’s writers and scholars’ delegation to the Moscow and Istanbul in 2009.

== Areas and Themes ==
She specializes in American literature, African American Literature, Revolutionary/ Marginal literatures, Post- Colonial and Contemporary women’s writings. Her areas of interest and research include Comparative Literatures, African Literature, Indian literatures, Translations, Folk literature, Poetry and feminist writings. She has successfully guided 6 scholars to their doctoral awards and continues to mentor both MA and PhD scholars. She has been a resource person in several major national and international platforms both in India and abroad. Her study tours, research and Social activism led her to visit severally countries like Germany, France, England, Switzerland, Sweden, Zimbabwe, South Africa, Thailand, Austria, Southern China, among many others, to speak on both literary, social and women concerns.
