= Meher Pestonji =

- Born: 19 September 1946; Mumbai, India
- Occupations: novelist, social worker, journalist

Meher Pestonji is an Indian social worker, freelance journalist, and writer. Pestonji has fought for the rights of the oppressed and underprivileged since the 1970s.

== Early life and education ==
Pestonji was born on 19 September 1946. She comes from the Parsi community in India and lives in Mumbai with her two daughters . Pestonji's marriage broke up when her children were four and five years old. She chose freelance journalism after that to have the opportunity to expand her areas of work and contribute freely.

Pestonji is a Psychology graduate and studied journalism.

== Career ==
Pestonji participated actively in the campaign to change rape law in the 1970s. She fought for the housing rights of slum dwellers, children's rights and anti-communalism campaigns. After the Babri Masjid riots in 1992–93, she took up to fight communalism and parochialism. She was a part of group of communal harmony activists who worked to restore the peace after the Mumbai riots in which close to 900 people died. Around this time, she took creative writing as a career. In the mid-1980s, Pestonji worked with street children and mobilised support for filmmaker Anand Patwardhan's campaign against slum destruction. During the Mumbai riots she worked with mohalla committees in Dharavi. For her work, Pestonji interviewed scientists, business people, and social workers.

In an interview to Times of India, she called herself 'an accidental parsi'. Pestonji's stance towards her own community also changed after the 1992–93 Mumbai riots. There has also been criticism and other interviews to challenge Pestonji's thoughts towards the parsi community. In a reply to her interview, a letter was sent to the editor talking about the bad taste the interview left o parsi readers.

== Works ==
Pestonji's writing is closely tied to her personal and journalist experiences along with the segment of society she is familiar with. Her storytelling is evident in the characterization of her work. Her books are:

- Mixed Marriage and Other Stories Parsi, HarperCollins 1999.
- Pervez, HarperCollins 2003.
- Sadak Chhaap, Penguin India 2005.
- Piano for sale
- Feeding crows
- Outsider
