= Manu Bhattathiri =

Indian writer

- Citizenship: Indian
- Occupations: Writer, co-founder of Cheers! Communications

Manu Bhattathiri is the author of Savithri’s Special Room and Other Stories and The Town That Laughed. He is also the co-founder of Cheers! Communications, an advertising agency based out of Bengaluru, India. The Town That Laughed has been listed by The Hindu as one of the top 10 books (fiction) of 2018.

== Works ==
The fictional town of Karuthupuzha is the setting for both of Manu Bhattathiri's works, Savithri's Special Room and The Town That Laughed. According to Bhattathiri, "it (Karuthupuzha) has enough violently funny, emotionally intense and beautifully imperfect people to write many stories about." The Hindu's review of The Town That Laughed has this to say: "Where the author truly excels, however, is in his characterisation." His style of writing, especially the setting of his stories in a small town, has been repeatedly compared to RK Narayan's Malgudi by The Hindu, the New Indian Express, and the Hindustan Times.

Savithri's Special Room and Other Stories has been published by HarperCollins while The Town That Laughed has been published by the Aleph Book Company. Savithri's Special Room and Other Stories was on the shortlist of the Crossword Book Jury Award. The Town That Laughed has been listed by The Hindu as one of the top 10 books (fiction) of 2018.

Bhattathiri's latest book The Oracle of Karuthupuzha was published by Aleph Book Company on 10 April 2021.
