= Netaji Subhas Open University =

University in Kolkata, India

- নেতাজি সুভাষ মুক্ত বিশ্ববিদ্যালয়
- Motto: The Premier State Open University in India
- Recognition: DEB; RCI; AICTE
- Type: State Open university
- Established: 25 November 1997; 28 years ago
- Accreditation: NAAC
- Academic affiliations: UGC; AIU; ACU
- Budget: ₹46.49 crore (US$5.0 million) (FY2023–24 est.)
- Chancellor: Governor of West Bengal
- Vice-Chancellor: Taj Mollick
- Faculty: 97 (2025)
- Students: 41,587 (2025)
- Undergraduates: 14,793 (2025)
- Postgraduates: 26,721 (2025)
- Doctoral students: 73 (2025)
- Location: Kolkata, West Bengal, India; 22°53′01″N 88°00′21″E
- Campus: Urban
- Language: English & Bengali
- Nickname: NSOU
- Website: www.wbnsou.ac.in

Netaji Subhas Open University (NSOU) is a state-open university imparting distance education in eastern India.

== History ==
It was established in 1997 to commemorate the birth centenary of Netaji Subhas Chandra Bose. It has its headquarters at 1, Woodburn Park, Kolkata - 700020, It was the residence of Sarat Chandra Bose from late 1928. Netaji lived mainly at 38/2 Elgin Road & at Woodburn Park between 1928 and 1931. Its medium of instruction is English and Bengali. Modelled on the Open University, UK and the IGNOU, it offers courses in different disciplines of taught graduate and post-graduate study and is one of the largest growing education universities in eastern India. The logo was designed by eminent painter Professor Mrinal Kanti Roy. It has its jurisdiction over West Bengal.

== Administration ==
- Chancellor: Governor of West Bengal
- Vice-chancellor: Ranjan Chakraborty
- Registrar: Kishore Sengupta
- Director, Study Centres: Ashit Baran Aich
- Finance Officer: Sachindra Chandra Kar
- Controller of Examinations: Rokeya Ray

== School ==
- School of Science.
- School of Humanities.
- School of Social Sciences.
- School of Professional Studies.
- School of Education.
- School of Vocational Studies.

== Campus ==
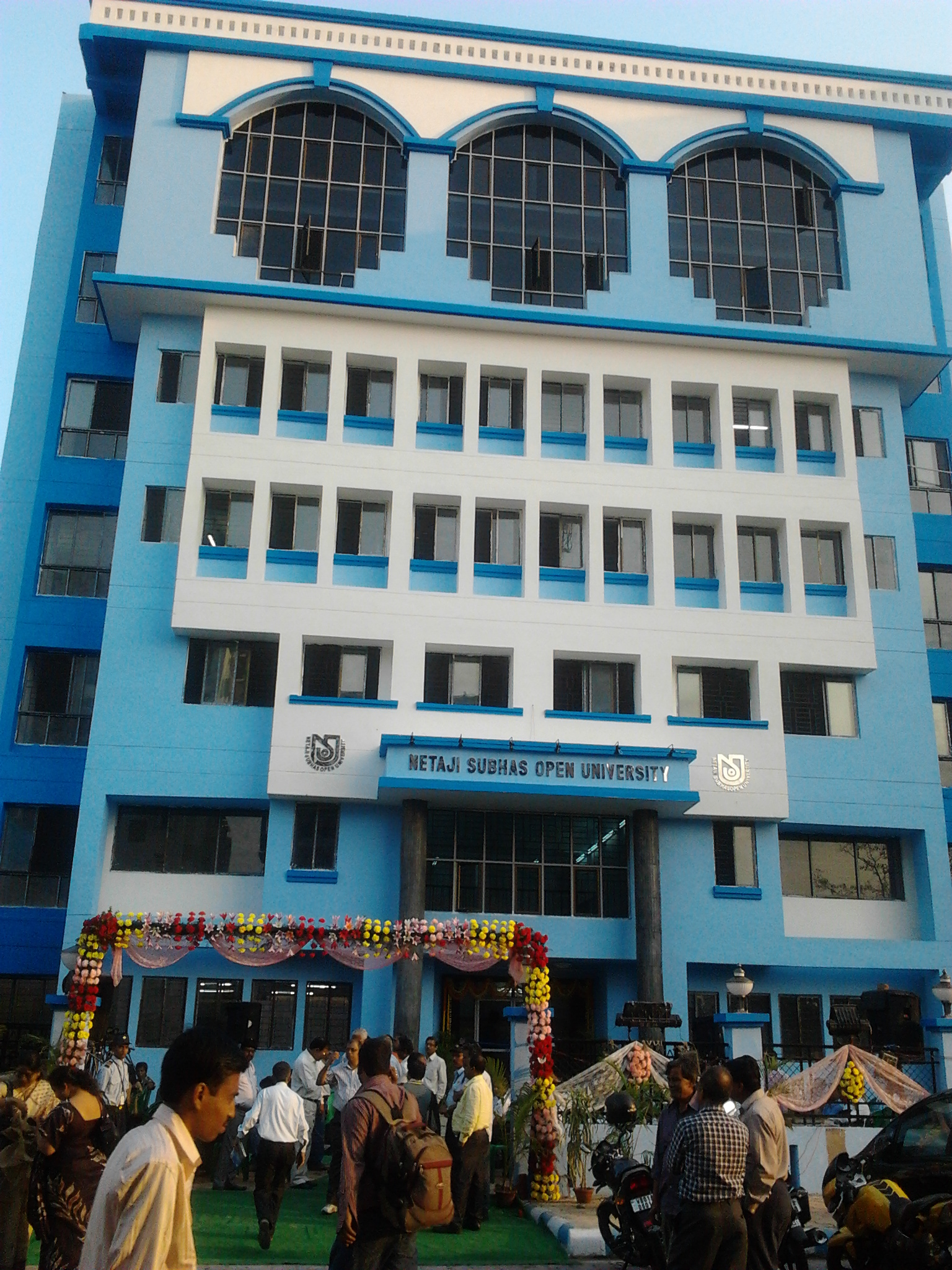
Headquarter of NSOU, DD-26, Sector-I, Salt Lake, Kolkata, West Bengal-700064

The university functions from the following campuses:

- Netaji Subhas Open University, DD-26, Sector I, Salt Lake, Kolkata 700064 (Headquarters of all administrative works)
- Netaji Subhas Open University, 1st Floor, K2, Bidhan Nagar Fire Station, Sector-5, Salt Lake, Kolkata 700091 (School of Sciences, Publications, Online and Video-Conferencing Units)
- Netaji Subhas Open University, 25/2, Ballygunge Circular Road, Kolkata 700019 (School of Education)
- Netaji Subhas Open University, 2nd Floor, 134/1, Meghnad Saha Sarani, Kolkata 700029 (School of Professional and Technological Studies, Office of the Controller of Examinations and Centre for Language Studies)
- Regional Centre, Netaji Subhas Open University, Kalyani Ghoshpara, Kalyani—741235 (University's first eco-friendly green campus)
- Regional Centre, Netaji Subhas Open University, Jawahar Lal Nehru Road, Durgapur, Pachim Bardhaman - 713 214 (adjacent to Durgapur Govt. Degree College)
- Regional Centre, Netaji Subhas Open University, Patkata, Kotwali, Jalpaiguri - 735 102 (inside the premises of Govt. Engineering College, Jalpaiguri)
- Netaji Subhas Open University, 24/8, Garcha 1st Lane, Kolkata 700019 (Transmission Centre of FM Channel Gyan Vani).
- Ben Fish Bhavan, Salt Lake (another print and Publication Section).

At present, the university is continuing its work with the 150 NSOU Study Centre List of Undergraduate BDP/UG . In the near future, more study centres will be opened.

== Teaching methods ==
To provide individualised support to its students, NSOU has a large number of Study Centres throughout West Bengal.

NSOU uses a variety of methods for distance learning:

1. Self Instructional Material: Self instructional study materials are distributed to the students through the Study Centres.

2. Audio-Video CD: Audio and video cassettes of a specific programme are supplied to the Study Centres. The audiotapes are run and video cassettes are screened at the Study Centres.

3. Personal Contact Programme: Instruction is imparted through self-instructional study materials and the Personal Contact Programme. The Personal Contact Programme is generally held on Saturdays and Sundays.

4. Gyan Vani FM Channel: NSOU started the Gyan Vani FM, Kolkata, a radio channel on 105.4 MHz.

5. Interactive Radio Counselling: The university broadcasts different subjects on the 4th Sunday of every month through All India Radio (AIR) at Kolkata B. Apart from the regular classes, various topics on the Awareness Programme; Support Services Special Programme of National Importance are also broadcast.

== Rankings and reputation ==
NSOU ranked 2nd position in the Open University section in India by the National Institutional Ranking Framework in 2024.

NIRF Open University Rankings
Ranking	2024
NIRF (Open Universities)	02

== Awards and achievements ==
In 2006, Netaji Subhas Open University received the Excellence in Distance Education Award (EDEA) from the Commonwealth of Learning (COL) for institutional excellence. UGC granted 12-B status to the institution in October 2024, now eligible for receiving Central assistance for research and development initiatives.

== Notable alumni ==
- Dipak Giri
- Antara Mitra
- Suvendu Adhikari
- Soumitrisha Kundu

== See also ==
- List of universities in India
