= Emily Critchley =

Experimental writer and academic

- Born: c.1980
- Education: University of Oxford (B.A.), University of Bristol (M.A.), University of Cambridge (PhD)
- Occupations: Author, poet, academic
- Employer: Formerly: University of Greenwich
- Awards: Jane Martin Prize for Poetry; John Kinsella-Tracy Ryan Prize for Poetry

Emily Critchley (born 1980) is an experimental writer and former academic. Her writings have garnered numerous international awards, including the Jane Martin Prize for Poetry (2011) and the John Kinsella-Tracy Ryan Prize for Poetry, among others. Her work has been translated into several languages.

== Early life ==
Critchley was born in Athens, Greece, and grew up in Dorset, England. Her father is English and her mother, Greek. She states that her influences include T. S. Eliot, the Language poets, Gertrude Stein, and John Berryman, as well as canonical English poets such as William Shakespeare and John Milton.

== Education ==
Critchley gained her B.A. in English Literature from the University of Oxford, her M.A. in Modern and Contemporary Poetry at Bristol University, and completed a PhD in American Language Poetry and phenomenology at the University of Cambridge.

== Career ==
Critchley specializes in contemporary experimental writing. In 2006, she organized a three-day international conference for contemporary experimental women's writing at the University of Cambridge and another in 2010 at the University of Greenwich. She is an editor of Out of Everywhere 2: Linguistically Innovative Poetry by Women in North America & the UK, the sequel to the poetry anthology Out of Everywhere published by Reality Street Press in 1996. She is a co-editor of #MeToo: A Poetry Collective.

Critchley has been widely anthologised and interviewed, and her writing has been compared to that of Denise Riley, Leslie Scalapino, and Mina Loy. She has been performing her work since 2000. In 2004, she won the John Kinsella-Tracy Ryan prize for poetry and in 2011, was joint winner of the national Jane Martin Prize for Poetry.

In 2024, Critchley published a poem, "Never Again is Now", in the journal Creative Flight, in which she appears to equate support for pro-Palestinian causes following Israel's response to the 7 October 2023 attacks, with antisemitism and Naziism. The poem repeats claims that Hamas attackers beheaded babies, and suggests Israel's critics "glorify rapists and celebrate warmongers". It accuses those demonstrating support for the people of Gaza of ignoring the "slavery and the sexual trafficking; the misogyny and paedophilia; the stolen aid and the starvation; the stonings and the mutilations; the public hangings and the bigger mission."

Critchley is formerly Associate Professor in English and Creative Writing at the University of Greenwich but left in 2026 to volunteer full time for Restore Britain. She no longer considers herself on the Left, politically, because, in her words, "the Left no longer champions the working classes but instead backs the insidious forces of Corporate Globalism married to neo-Marxism (Fabianism), which hits the working classes first and hardest, as well as destroying nation states." She opposes open borders, as well as the neo-Marxism that has crept into most educational and cultural institutions in Britain.

Critchley also disavows her former "academic feminism". In 2025–2026, she spent a year volunteering for an organisation researching the grooming gangs phenomenon. After learning of the extent and detail of the scandal – from Elon Musk's tweet (January 2025) – she has admitted to shame at her former ignorance and having spent so much of her career on the minutiae of academic feminism, while "the worst crimes against children and women have been perpetrated on British soil for longer than I’ve been alive." "Why are polite, middle-class feminists not interested in this?" She has described herself as fiercely proud of Western culture and European heritage which contemporary education has been set up for decades to deconstruct. She is a member of the Save Europe organisation, Restore Britain and UNITY. She currently lives in London.

== Critical writing ==
- Afterword to Adelaide Ivánova's The Hammer and Other Poems (The Poetry Translation Centre, April 2019)
- Introduction to #MeToo: A Poetry Collective (Chicago Review, Summer, 2018)
- "W.S. Graham and the Caught Habits of Language", talk, Newcastle Poetry Festival (summer 2018)
- Entries on Rachel Blau DuPlessis, Rosmarie Waldrop, Jean Day, Vanessa Place, Jennifer Moxley and Alice Notley in The Oxford Companion to Modern Poetry, ed. Ian Hamilton and Jeremy Noel Tod (Oxford University Press, 2013)
- "Denise Riley: 'Writing our / Difficulties'", Poetry Review (2012)
- "'Moi aussi, Marianne,' or Moving the Targets, being a crypto-ironic response, etc." The Claudius App (August 2011)
- Guest editor of the Journal of British and Irish Innovative Poetry, 3:2: a Greenwich Cross-Genre Festival edition (September 2011)
- "'We live on buoyant fragments' (Andrea Brady): A further selection of American writers from the Greenwich Cross-Genre Festival", Cambridge Literary Review, ed. Boris Jardine and Lydia White, 1:5 (May 2011)
- "A selection of North American women writers from the Greenwich Cross-Genre Festival (July 2010), and some thoughts about their work", Cambridge Literary Review, ed. Boris Jardine and Lydia White, 1:4 (Michaelmas 2010); pp. 9–43
- "Lyn Hejinian's Faustienne Beings-With", Stress Fractures, ed., Tom Chivers (London: Penned in the Margins, 2010), pp. 55–72
- "Leslie Scalapino's 'alternative ways of seeing'", Delirious Hem, eds, Cara Benson, Elizabeth Bryant, Catherine Wagner (September 5, 2010) lesliescalapinotribute.wikispaces.com/file/view/Emily+Critchley7.pdf
- Review of Lisa Robertson's Magenta Soul Whip, HOW2 Journal, 3: 3 (2009)
- "'[D]oubts, Complications and Distractions': Rethinking the Role of Women in Language Poetry", Hot Gun! ed., Josh Stanley, 1:1 (Summer 09) ), pp. 29–49
- "Post-Marginal Positions: Women and the UK Experimental/Avant-Garde Poetry Community", ed. Cathy Wagner, Jacket magazine, 1:34 (Oct 2007)
- 'Dilemmatic boundaries: constructing a poetics of thinking', Intercapillary Space, ed, Edmund Hardy, 1:4 (November 2006) www.lulu.com/items/volume_34/533000/533882/2/print/533882.pdf
- A conference overview + introduction to the Cambridge Contemporary Experimental Women's Poetry Festival (2006), How2 journal, vol. 3:1 (Summer 2007)

== Published works ==
- When I say I Believe Women… (London: bad press, 2006)
- Of All the Surprises (Switzerland: Dusie, 2007)
- Who handles one over the Backlash (Norfolk: Oystercatcher Press, 2008)
- Hopeful For Love Are Th' Impoverish'd Of Faith (Southampton: Torque Press, 2010)
- Love / All That / & OK: Selected Writing (London: Penned in the Margins, 2011)
- Sonnets for Luke (Liverpool: Holdfire press, 2011)
- IMAGINARYLOVEPOEMS (Paris: Corrupt Press, 2011)
- This is not a True Thing (London: Intercapillary Press, 2013)
- Salutation to Poetry, with John Hall (London: Crater Press, 2015)
- Some Curious Thing (London: Barque Press, 2016)
- Ten Thousand Things (Norfolk: Boiler House Press, 2017)
- These. Insuing. Sonnets, with Eric Langley (London: Crater Press, 2018)
- Arrangements (Bristol: Shearsman Books, 2018)
- Alphabet Poem: For Kids! with Michael Kindellan and Alison Honey-Woods (London: Prototype, 2020)
- Home (London: Prototype, 2021)

== Awards and accolades ==
- National Poetry Competition (2020) -- Poems long listed
- Forward Prize for poetry (2018) -- Poems Highly Commended
- Pacuare Nature Poetry Competition, Trinidad and Tobago (2015) -- Runner up
- Jane Martin Prize for Poetry (2011) -- National Winner
- The John Kinsella-Tracy Ryan Prize for Poetry (University of Cambridge, 2004) -- Winner
- The Other Prize (University of Cambridge, 2003) -- Winner for best original play

== Sources ==
- Wheatley, David, Contemporary British Poetry (London: Palgrave, 2015),
- Zword, Megan (2013), Review of Love / All That / & OK, Hix Eros 2 (November 2013)
- Kennedy, David and Kennedy, Christine, Women's Experimental Poetry in Britain 1970–2010: Body, Time & Locale (Liverpool University Press, 2013)
- Skoulding, Zoe, Contemporary Women's Poetry and Urban Space: Experimental Cities (Palgrave Macmillan, 2013)
- Morris, Marianne, The Claudius App (Summer 2011)
- Spence, Steve, Stride Magazine (Spring 2011)
- Tuma, Keith, Chicago Review, 53:1 (Spring 2007)
