= Zvonko Taneski =

Macedonian poet, literary critic

Zvonko Taneski (born 12 March 1980, Skopje) is a Macedonian poet, literary critic, university professor in Slovakia and translator.

== Profile ==
Studies of general and comparative literature was graduated from the Faculty of Philology of Ss. Cyril and Methodius University of Skopje in Skopje. In 2007 he defended his PhD thesis from “Theory and history of Slovak literature” at the Department of Slovak Literature and Literary Science on Comenius University in Bratislava. He worked as an independent researcher at the Institute of World Literature in Slovak Academy of Sciences in Bratislava (2007–2008). In 2011 the commission for assessing scientific qualification of Slovak Academy of Science acknowledged his scientific qualification level IIa (senior researcher) in 2011, and in the same year he received a habilitation at the Faculty of Foreign Languages FON University in Skopje, where he worked from 2011 to 2014.

He worked at the Research Institute on Cultural Heritage of Constantine and Methodius in Faculty of Arts at the Constantine the Philosopher University in Nitra from 2007 to 2011 year and at the same workplace acts as assistant professor (2014–2015). From September 2015 he works as an associate professor on Department of Slavic Philology in Faculty of Arts at Comenius University. Research activities: Comparative Slavonic studies and Balkan Linguistic and Literary studies.
