= Josephine Dickinson =

English poet (born 1957)

- Born: 9 January 1957 (age 69); London
- Occupation: poet
- Writing career
- Language: English

Josephine Dickinson (born 9 January 1957) is an English poet. When Dickinson was eighteen months old, she contracted meningitis and was hospitalized for two weeks during the acute phase; she lost her hearing after age six. She resides in a remote area of the Pennines, and raises a small flock of sheep along with writing poetry. In her volume of poetry entitled Silence Fell, which became a New York Times editor's choice book in 2007, she wrote about her six-year marriage to her husband, which began when she was 41 and he was in his late 80s. Reviewer James Longenbach in the New York Times described her poetry as not showy, with delicate near-rhymes which feel "inevitable" and that her subject matter showed an "acute relationship to the physical sensation of language" which "distinguishes these humble, deftly made poems." Chicago Tribune reviewer Katie Peterson wrote that Dickinson's poems were about "sheep farming and love" and that she is "at her best when she addresses love directly" with sometimes "complicated conclusions about sex and intimacy" and her "frank ability to bear pleasure and difficulty together". Critic Phoebe Pettingell calls Dickinson's early work "underwritten," but praised Silence Fell as, "emotionally engaging," expressing the hope that Dickinson would "develop from a pleasant, provincial poet to a rich and strange singer of the rural scene." Writing in the Chicago Sun-Times, poet Amy Newman described Dickinson as having "a talent for conveying the inaudible, the aura around us that can't be heard but can be felt."

== Works ==
- Scarberry Hill (2001)
- The Voice (2003)
- Silence Fell (2007), Houghton Mifflin publisher
- Night Journey (2008)
