= Peter Boxall (literary scholar) =

British academic and writer

Peter Boxall FBA
- Education: University of Sussex
- Occupation: Educator
- Employer: University of Oxford
- Known for: Editor of Textual Practice
- Notable work: 1001 Books You Must Read Before You Die; The Oxford History of the Novel, Volume 7: British and Irish Fiction Since 1940; Twenty-First-Century Fiction; The Value of the Novel

Peter Boxall FBA is a British academic and writer. He is Goldsmiths’ Professor of English literature at the University of Oxford and professorial fellow of New College.

He works on contemporary literature, literary theory and literary modernism. Boxall is notable as the editor of the well-established journal of literary theory, Textual Practice, for his editorship of 1001 Books You Must Read Before You Die and The Oxford History of the Novel, Volume 7: British and Irish Fiction Since 1940, and for his work on contemporary fiction, most notably Twenty-First-Century Fiction (Cambridge University Press, 2013) and The Value of the Novel (Cambridge University Press, 2015).

In 2024, he was elected a Fellow of the British Academy (FBA), the United Kingdom's national academy for the humanities and social sciences.

== Published works ==
=== Articles ===
- 2015: Science, technology and the posthuman. The Cambridge Companion to British Fiction Since 1945.
- 2012: Late: Fictional Time in the Twenty-First Century. Contemporary Literature, pp. 681–712.
- 2011: The threshold of vision: the animal gaze in Beckett, Sebald, and Coetzee. Journal of Beckett Studies, 20 (2). pp. 120–148
- 2008: "There's no lack of void": waste and abundance in Beckett and DeLillo. SubStance, 37(2). pp. 56–70.
- 2007: Boxall, Peter, Hadfield, Andrew, Smith, Lindsay and Surprenant, Celene. Preface. Year's Work in Critical and Cultural Theory.

=== Books ===
- 2015: Boxall, Peter The value of the novel. Cambridge University Press, Cambridge. ISBN 9781107637245
- 2013: Boxall, Peter Twenty-first century fiction: a critical introduction. Cambridge University Press, Cambridge. ISBN 9781107006911
- 2009: Boxall, Peter Since Beckett: contemporary writing in the wake of modernism. Continuum Literary Studies . Continuum. ISBN 9780826491671

=== Editor ===
- 2010: 1001 Books You Must Read Before You Die, Revised and Updated Edition. ISBN 9780789320391
- 2006: 1001 Books You Must Read Before You Die. ISBN 9781844034178
