= 1001 Books You Must Read Before You Die =

Literary reference book

- Cover of the first edition
- Editor: Peter Boxall
- Language: English
- Series: 1001 Before You Die
- Subject: Best books
- Published: 2006 (Cassell Illustrated)
- Publication place: United Kingdom
- Media type: Print (paperback)
- Pages: 960 (first edition)
- ISBN: 978-1-844-03417-8
- OCLC: 906238342

1001 Books You Must Read Before You Die is a literary reference book compiled by over one hundred literary critics worldwide and edited by Peter Boxall, Professor of English at Sussex University, with an introduction by Peter Ackroyd. Each title is accompanied by a brief synopsis and critique briefly explaining why the book was chosen. Some entries have illustrations. This book is part of a series from Quintessence Editions Ltd.

== The list ==
The list contains 1001 titles and is made up of novels, short stories, and short story collections. There is also one pamphlet (A Modest Proposal), one book of collected text (Adjunct: An Undigest), and one graphic novel (Watchmen). The most featured authors on the 2006 list are J. M. Coetzee and Charles Dickens with ten titles each.

There was a major revision of 280 odd titles in 2008. The clear shift within the list has been the removal of ~300 works almost entirely by English-language authors who have more than one title on the original list in favour of lesser known works, often by non-English-language writers.

The 2010 revised and updated edition of the book is less Anglocentric and lists only four titles from Dickens and five from Coetzee, who has the most of any writer on the list. It also includes a collection of essays by Albert Camus, The Rebel. Minor changes of fewer than 20 books were made in 2010 and 2012.

== Editions ==
This is not a standalone publication; rather, its original English edition has undergone five updated editions, transitioning through various publishing houses. Consequently, its selection has evolved over a 15-year cycle (2006-2021). In addition to the English revisions, the work has been published in adapted forms in the languages of the main publishing markets, such as Spanish, French, German, Portuguese, Italian, Danish, Chinese, Japanese, Korean, Swedish, etc., with each adaptation tailored to its cultural context.

While led by a principal director, the work benefits from the contributions of a diverse group of advisors involved in the selection and compilation of reviews. This group also changes across the different English editions and typically includes a principal person responsible for the version in each language, such as Jennifer Byrne (AU), Peter Ackroyd (DE), José-Carlos Mainer (ES), Göran Hägg (SV), Jean d'Ormesson (FR), Ed van Eeden (NL), Olaf Jensen (NO), and Sadanori Betsumiya (JP). Therefore, it is neither a personal endeavor nor the result of an open and massive process.
