= Salleh Ben Joned =

- Born: 5 July 1941; Melaka, Straits Settlements (present-day Malaysia)
- Died: 29 October 2020 (aged 79); Kuala Lumpur, Malaysia
- Occupations: Poet, writer
- Notable work: Sajak-Sajak Salleh – Poems Sacred and Profane, The Amok of Mat Solo

Salleh Ben Joned (5 July 1941 - 29 October 2020) was a Malaysian poet, whom some have called the "bad boy of Malaysian literature".

== Early life ==
Salleh was born in Melaka on 5 July 1941, where he later attended the Malacca High School. He received a Colombo Plan scholarship in 1963 to study English literature in Australia, where he studied first in Adelaide, then at the University of Tasmania where he was a student of James McAuley.

== Career ==
After returning to Malaysia in 1973, Salleh taught English literature at the University of Malaya, before becoming a freelance writer in 1983. He was also a columnist for the New Straits Times in the 1980s and 1990s. His works include Sajak-Sajak Salleh – Poems Sacred and Profane and The Amok of Mat Solo. His work often employed apparent profanity and blasphemy to criticise contemporary political and religious ideologies in Malaysia; in 1974 he publicly urinated at an art exhibition in response to what he saw as its pretentiousness. An essay written by Salleh explaining his rationale for this 'performance art' was later included in texts on art history.

== Death ==
Salleh died at the age of 79 from heart failure at 1:21 am on 29 October 2020 at the University Malaya Medical Centre.
