= Stephen Rodefer =

American poet and painter

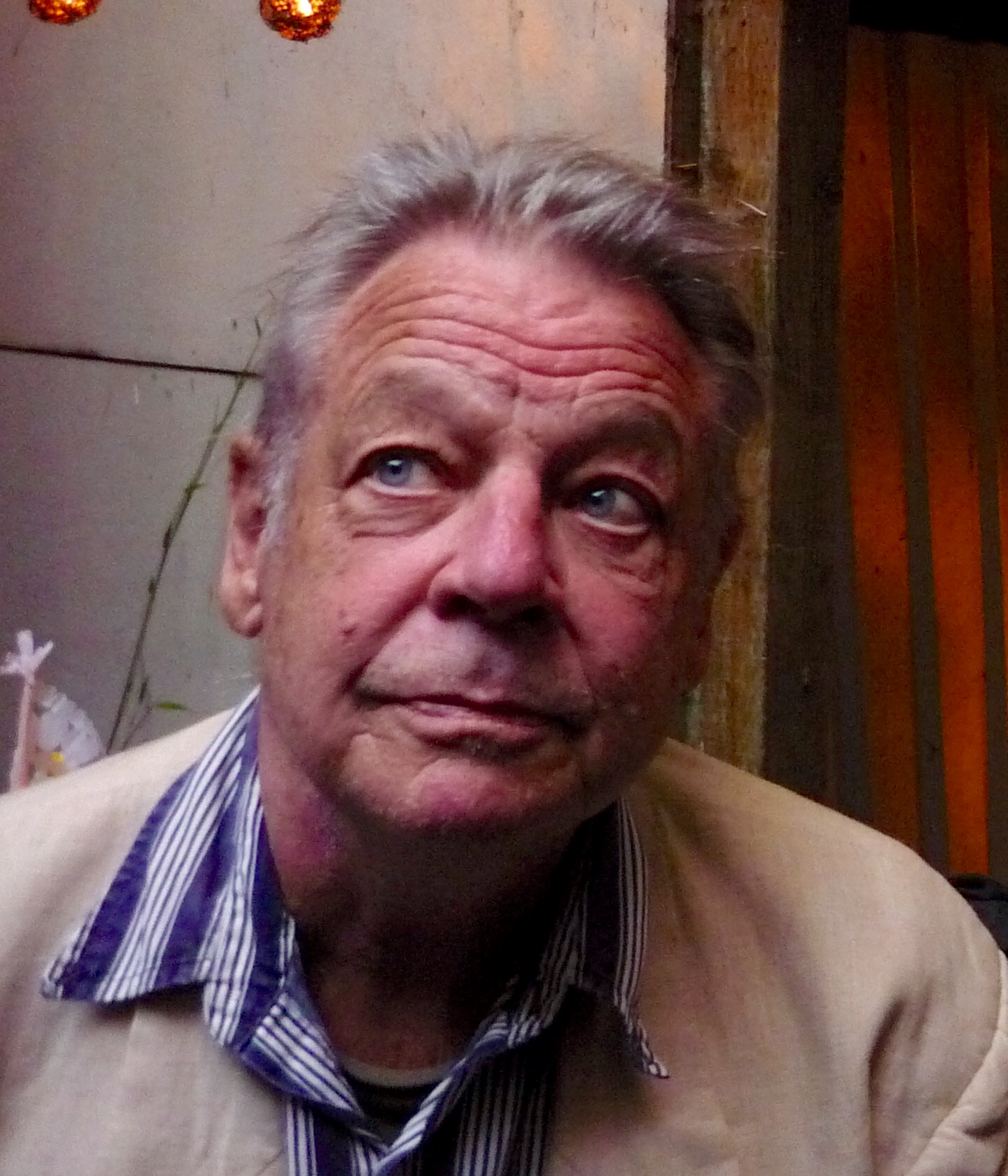
- Rodefer in 2013
- Born: November 20, 1940; Bellaire, Ohio, U.S.
- Died: August 22, 2015 (aged 74); Paris, France
- Occupations: Poet, Painter
- Writing career
- Language: English, French
- Notable work: Four Lectures
- Literary movement: Language poetry

Stephen Rodefer (November 20, 1940 – August 22, 2015) was an American poet and painter who lived in Paris and London. Born in Bellaire, Ohio, he knew many of the early beat and Black Mountain poets, including Allen Ginsberg, Gregory Corso, Charles Olson, and Robert Creeley. Rodefer was one of the original Language poets and taught widely, including: UNM, SUNY Buffalo, UC Berkeley, UC San Diego, San Francisco State, and the American University of Paris. Rodefer was the first American poet to be offered a Fellowship at Cambridge University.

Stephen Rodefer's papers were purchased by Stanford University and are on permanent view there. Rodefer died at the age of 74 in Paris in August, 2015.

With graduate degrees from the State University of New York (SUNY) Buffalo and from San Francisco State University, Rodefer was the author of One or Two Love Poems from the White World, The Bell Clerk's Tears Keep Flowing, Four Lectures (which was a winner of the American Poetry Center’s Annual Book Award), Oriflamme Day (with poet Benjamin Friedlander), Emergency Measures, Passing Duration, Leaving, Erasures, Left Under A Cloud, Call It Thought, and Mon Canard, among other titles.

His essay on canon-formation, "The Age in its Cage: A Note to Mr Mendelssohn on the Sociologic Allegory of Literature and the Deformation of the Canonymous", was featured in the Chicago Review, and that literary journal published a special issue devoted to his work in 2008.

In addition to Villon, Rodefer has published translations of Sappho, selections from the Greek Anthology, Catullus, Lucretius, Dante, Baudelaire, Rilke, Frank O’Hara and the Cuban poet Noel Nicola.

His graphic work, LANGUAGE PICTURES, has been exhibited in recent years in New York, Los Angeles, Chicago, London, Paris and Prague.

At the time of his death he was translating Baudelaire for a collection to be published next year, titled Baudelaire OH/Fever Flowers: Les fleurs du val.

== Education ==
1959-63 Amherst College, Amherst, Massachusetts, Art History & Literature

1959-61 SUNY Buffalo, New York, Graduate Studies in Poetry and Literature

== Books ==
Poetry

- 2008: Call it Thought: Selected Poems. Carcanet, Manchester (UK)
- 2000: Left Under a Cloud. Alfred David Editions, London.
- 2000: Mon Canard: Six Poems. The Figures, Great Barrington, MA
- 1996: Answer to Dr Agathon. Poetical Histories, Cambridge (UK)
- 1994: Erasers. Equipage, Cambridge (UK)
- 1992: Leaving. Equipage, Cambridge (UK)
- 1992: Double Imperative Landscapes: Daydreams of Frascati, with Chip Sullivan (Berkeley, CA: Sake Forebear)
- 1991: Passing Duration. Burning Deck, Providence, RI
- 1987: Emergency Measures (Great Barrington, MA: The Figures)
- 1984: Oriflamme Day, with Benjamin Friedlander (Oakland, CA: House of K)
- 1982: Four Lectures (Berkeley, CA : The Figures) view facsimile or download reading copy
- 1981: Plane Debris (Berkeley, CA: Tuumba Press)
- 1978: The Bell Clerk’s Tears Keep Flowing (Berkeley, CA: The Figures)
- 1976: One or Two Love Poems from the White World (Placitas, NM: Duende)
- 1965: The Knife. Island Press, Toronto.

Translation

- 2008: Hölderlin, with Nick Walker (UK: Barque Editions)
- 2008: Baudelaire, Fever Flowers: les fleurs du val (UK: Barque Editions)
- 1994: Rilke I IV VI, with Geoff Ward and Ian Patterson (Cambridge, UK: Poetical Histories)
- 1991: 'Dante: Selections from the Inferno' in Passing Duration
- 1985: Orpheus [Rilke] (San Francisco: Tuscany Alley)
- 1985: Safety, translations from Sappho and the Greek Anthology (Berkeley, CA: Margery Cantor)
- 1976: Villon, by Jean Calais [pen name] (San Francisco: Pick Pocket Series)
- 1973: After Lucretius (University of Connecticut, Storrs, CT)

Criticism

- 2008: The Monkeys Donut: Essays in Post-Classical American Literature (London: Kollophon)
- 1988: The Library of Label (Toronto: Coach House)

== Reviews ==
- Jacket Magazine 15, December 2001. Andrea Brady reviews Left Under a Cloud by Stephen Rodefer
- The Gig 8: Review of Stephen Rodefer’s Mon Canard and Left Under a Cloud
