= K. V. Dominic =

Indian author

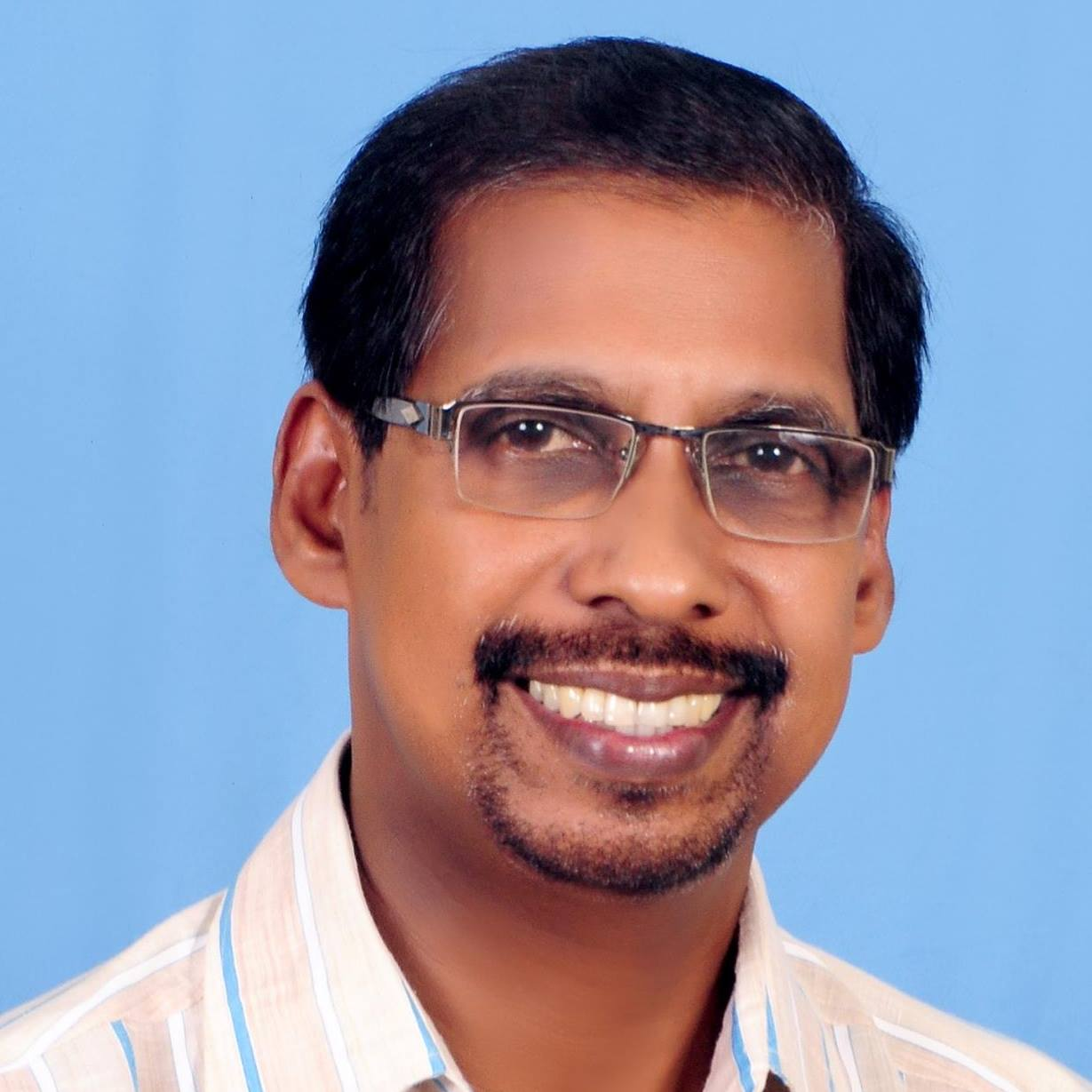
- Born: 13 February 1956 (age 70); Kalady, Kerala, India
- Occupations: Writer, poet, literary critic
- Writing career
- Notable works: Winged Reason; Write Son, Write; Multicultural Symphony
- Website: www.profkvdominic.com

Kannappillil Varghese Dominic (born 13 February, 1956) is an Indian poet, writer, editor, and literary critic. He is a retired Associate Professor of the PG & Research Department of English, Newman College, Thodupuzha, Kerala.

== Literary career ==
Dominic has published 56 books including nine books of English poems, one each translated book of poetry in Hindi, French, Bengali, Tamil, Malayalam and Gujarati and 8 short story collections, four in English and one each in French, Hindi, Malayalam and Bengali. His poems feature in the anthology, The Dance of the Peacock: An Anthology of English Poetry from India, published by Hidden Brook Press, Canada. His research papers, poems, short stories, book reviews, one act plays etc. have been published in innumerable international refereed journal issues and edited anthologies. There are five critical books on his poetry and one on his short stories. He has organized twelve national/international literary conferences in various universities and colleges in India and participated in countless conferences, workshops, seminars, symposiums in India and abroad. As an editor of two international refereed biannual research journals in English language and literature, he is an expert in research methodology and documentation style and has conducted innumerable workshops on research methodology in different parts of India and abroad. Dominic's poetry has been studied by scholars and writers from India and abroad. A complete collection of K. V. Dominic's poems was published by Modern History Press, Ann Arbor, USA in 2016.

== Activities and recognition ==
Dominic is the Secretary of the GIEWEC (Guild of Indian English Writers Editors and Critics). He conducts workshop on research methodology and MLA style of documentation in different parts of India every year.

1. International Poets Academy, Chennai conferred on him the LIFETIME ACHIEVEMENT AWARD “in recognition of his distinguished contribution to World Poetry, and for his pioneering pursuits in influencing mankind towards the path of World Peace, Global Harmony and Cosmic Humanism” on 9 July 2009 at the World Poetry Day Celebration at World Peace Centre, Chemmencherry, Chennai.
2. India Inter-Continental Cultural Association, Chandigarh conferred on him Kafla Inter-continental Award of Honour SAHITYA SHIROMANI in recognition of his contribution in the field of literature at the 10th International Writers' Festival at Trivandrum (Kerala) on 28 December 2014.
3. International Sufi Centre, Bangalore conferred a citation of Brightest Honour in recognition of his distinguished contribution to Indian English Poetry and for his pursuits in influencing mankind towards Communal Harmony and Cosmic Humanism, on 1 September 2020.
4. Children’s Literature Research Centre (CLRC), Agartala, Tripura, India’s CLRC LITERARY AWARD 2025 is proudly presented to PROF. DR. K. V. DOMINIC on 29 June 2025 in recognition of his outstanding contributions in the fields of poetry & literature.

== Editorship ==
Dominic is editor and publisher of the International Journal on Multicultural Literature (IJML) and Editor-in-Chief of the Guild's international refereed biannual journal, Writers Editors Critics (WEC).

== Interviews ==
Dominic has been interviewed by several scholars and litterateurs.

- Interview with Dr. K. V. Dominic by Prof. Elisabetta Marino published in MOSAICO, Italiano February 2012 issue and English Translation in Labyrinth vol-4 No.-2, Gwalior, India, April, 2012.
- Interview with Dr. K. V. Dominic by Dr. Rohit Phutela published in International Journal on Multicultural Literature, Vol-7, No-1, Kerala, India, January, 2017.
- Dr. K. V. Dominic in Conversation with Parthajit Ghosh published in Poetcrit Vol-30, No-2, Himachal Pradesh, India, July 2017
- Revelations of a Pantheistic Poet: Dr K.V. Dominic in Conversation by Goutam Karmakar published in Writers in Conversation, Flinders University Journal, Vol-4, No- 2, Australia, August 2017.
- Interview with Dr. K. V. Dominic by Dr. Jernail Singh Anand. Published in Interviews with Poets, Critical Thinkers and Scholars, 21st CENTURY CRITICAL THOUGHT, A DIALOGUE WITH POSTMODERN VOICES, Volume 3. By Jernail Singh Anand. Published by Earth Vision Publications, Gurugram, Haryana, India, 2021.
- Interview by Dr. S. Barathi in the book A Conversation with Contemporary Indian English Poets, Edited by Dr. S. Barathi and published by Book Leaf Publishing (www.bookleafpub.com), September 2023.

== Published books ==
=== Poetry collection ===
- Winged Reason (2010), Authorspress, New Delhi
- Write Son, Write (2011), Gnosis, New Delhi
- Multicultural Symphony (2014), Gnosis, New Delhi
- Contemporary Concerns and Beyond (2016), Authorspress New Delhi
- K. V. Dominic Essential Readings and Study Guide (2016), Modern History Press, Ann Arbor, USA
- Abheepsa (2016), Trans. Dr. Santosh Alex. Authorspress, New Delhi
- Aapni Abheepsa (2016), Trans. Fr. Varghese Paul, SJ and Yoseph Macwan. Rennade Prakashan, Ahmedabad
- Cataracts of Compassion (2017), Authors Press, New Delhi
- Poèmes Philosophiques de K V Dominic: Poèmes sur la justice sociale, les droits des femmes et de l'environnement (French Edition) (2019) Kindle Edition
- Winged Reason--A Bilingual Anthology of Poems Translated by Barathi Srinivasan. New Delhi: Authorspress, 2019.
- Write My Son, Write Translated into Bengali by Dr. Sabita Chakraborty. Underground Literature, Kolkata, 2019.
- Musings on Covid Pandemic and Beyond (2021) Authorspress, [New Delhi]
- Ezhuthoo Makane, Ezhuthoo (Malayalam Translation of Selected English Poems) Translation by Madhu S. Authorspress, New Delhi, 2021 December
- Thorns and Agonies (2024) Authorspress, New Delhi
- Echoes of War, Whispers of Wisdom--A Collection of Poems (2026) Authorspress, New Delhi

=== Short story ===
- Who is Responsible? (2016), Authorspress, New Delhi
- Sanchita Karma and Other Tales of Ethics and Choice from India (2018), Modern History Press, Ann Arbor, USA
- Aaraanu Utharavadi (Malayalam translation of selected short stories) (2022) Authorspress. New Delhi
- Nirbachito Chotogalpo (Bengali translation of selected short stories) (2022) Translated by Dr. Sabita Chakrabarti and Biswanath Kundu. Kolkata: Rohini Nandan.
- Selected Short Stories in English and French Translated into French by Dominique De Miscault. Amazon kindle version (September 2022).
- Short Stories During Covid-19, Authorspress, New Delhi, 2022.
- Prof. K. V. Dominic's Selected Short Stories (प्रोफेसर के. वी. डोमिनिक की चुनी हुई कहानियां)Translated by Dr. Sangeeta Mahesh. Authorspress, New Delhi, 2023.
- Tales of Ethics, Amazon Kindle Edition, July 2024.
- Tales of Ethos. Authorspress, New Delhi, 2025.

=== Criticism ===
- Pathos in the Short Stories of Rabindranath Tagore. New Delhi: Sarup Book Publishers, 2009.
- Multicultural Consciousness in the Novels of R. K. Narayan. New Delhi. Authorspress, 2012.

=== Edited books ===
- Postcolonial Readings in Indo-Anglian Literature. New Delhi: Authorspress, 2009.
- Selected Short Stories in Contemporary Indo-Anglian Literature. New Delhi: Sarup Book Publishers, 2009.
- Stephen Gill's Poetry: Panorama World Peace. New Delhi: Gnosis, 2010.
- Discourses on Contemporary Indian English Poets. New Delhi: Gnosis, 2010.
- Studies in Contemporary Canadian Literature. New Delhi: Sarup Book Publishers, 2010.
- Critical Studies on Contemporary Indian English Women Writers. Sarup Book Publishers, 2010.
- Critical Perspectives on the Poetry of R. K. Singh, D. C. Chambial and I. K. Sharma. New Delhi: Access, 2011.
- Discourses on Five Indian Poets in English: Keki N. Daruwalla, Shiv. K. Kumar, Pronab Kumar Majumder, Syed Ameeruddin and Aju Mukhopadhyay. New Delhi: Authorspress, 2011.
- Concepts and Contexts of Diasporic Literature of India. New Delhi: Gnosis, 2011.
- Changing Face of Women in Literature: The Flaming Spirit. New Delhi: Gnosis, 2012.
- Studies on Six Indian Poets in English: Jayanta Mahapatra, Hazara Singh, P C K Prem, Gopikrishnan Kottoor, Manas Bakshi, Chandramoni Narayanaswamy. New Delhi: Gnosis, 2012.
- African and Afro-American Literature: Insights and Interpretations. New Delhi. Authorspress, 2012.
- Critical Evaluation of Contemporary Indian Poetry in English. New Delhi. Access, 2012.
- Jayanti M. Dalal: Select Stories(Edited Stories) (2013), Authorspress, New Delhi
- Sarojini Sahoo's Feminine Reflections. New Delhi: Authorspress, 2014.
- Indian Literatures in English: New Directions, Newer Possibilities. New Delhi: Authorspress, 2014.
- Multicultural Literature of India: A Critical Evaluation of Contemporary Regional Literatures. Jaipur: Vking Publishers, 2015.
- World English Fiction: Bridging Oneness. Jaipur: Vking Publishers, 2015.
- Multicultural Studies on Three Nobel Laureates—Rabindranath Tagore, Toni Morrison and Alice Munro. New Delhi: Authorspress, 2016.

- Pamela Jeyaraju, eds. Environmental Literature: Research Papers and Poems. New Delhi: Authorspress, 2016.
- The Poetic Art of T. V. Reddy: New Perspectives. New Delhi: Authorspress, 2017.
- Raichel M Sylus, eds. Multicultural Matrix: Shifting Paradigms. New Delhi: Authors Press, 2017.
- S. Barathi, eds. Diasporas and Dilemmas: The Voice of an Exile. New Delhi: Authors Press, 2017.
- A Journey from Within to Beyond: A Bunch of Short Stories Culled from Different Cultures. New Delhi: Authors Press, 2018.
- Muse of Now Paradigm: An Entry into Poepro. New Delhi: Authorspress, 2020.
- Selected Lyrics of GIEWEC Poets. New Delhi: Authorspress, 2022.
- Eco-Tales of India. New Delhi: Authorspress, 2024.
- MAPPING GENDER: INTERDISCIPLINARY PATHWAYS TO UNDERSTANDING THE WORLD (Volume-1), Chief Editor: Dr. K V Dominic, Associate Editor: Dr. Bala Agarwal. Paperback. Authorspress, New Delhi, 7 December 2025.
- MAPPING GENDER: INTERDISCIPLINARY PATHWAYS TO UNDERSTANDING THE WORLD (Volume-2), Chief Editor: Dr. K V Dominic, Associate Editor: Dr. Bala Agarwal. Paperback. Authorspress, New Delhi, 7 December 2025.

=== Critical books on Dominic's Poetry and Short Stories ===
- English Poetry in India: A Comprehensive Survey of Trends and Thought Patterns. By P C K Prem. Published by Authorspress, New Delhi in 2011
- Philosophical Musings for a Meaningful Life: An Analysis of K. V. Dominic's Poems(2016), Ed. S. Kumaran., Modern History Press, Ann Arbor, United States
- Essential Readings and Study Guide.(2016), Ed. Victor R. Volkman. Modern History Press, Ann Arbor, United States
- Write My Son, Write—Text and Interpretation: An Exercise in Reading. (2016) By Ramesh Chandra Mukhopadhayaya. Modern History Press, Ann Arbor, United States
- A Critical Survey of Indo-English Poetry. By Prof. T. V. Reddy. Published by Authorspress, New Delhi in 2016
- K V DOMINIC CRITICISM AND COMMENTARY: AN ESSENTIAL READINGS COMPANION. By Ramesh Chandra Mukhopadhyaya. Modern History Press, Ann Arbor, USA in 2017
- The Social, Cultural and Spiritual Dimensions of Modern Indian Poetry in English. Edited by Vijay Kumar Roy. Cambridge Scholars Publishing, Lady Stephenson Library, Newcastle upon Tyne, NE6 2PA, UK, 2017
- Poetical Sensibility of K V Dominic's Creative Muse. By Dr. Ramesh Chandra Mukhopadhyaya. New Delhi: Authorspress, 2019.
- P.C.K. Prem's History of Contemporary Indian English Poetry: An Appraisal, Volume I & II. New Delhi: Authorspress, 2019.
- Tales Unraveled: Sufferings and Pangs of the Downtrodden in the Short Stories of K. V. Dominic. Edited by Dr. S. Barathi. Published by Authorspress, New Delhi, 2023.
