= Jernail Singh Anand =

Indian writer

Dr. Jernail Singh Anand
- ਜਰਨੈਲ ਸਿੰਘ ਆਨੰਦ
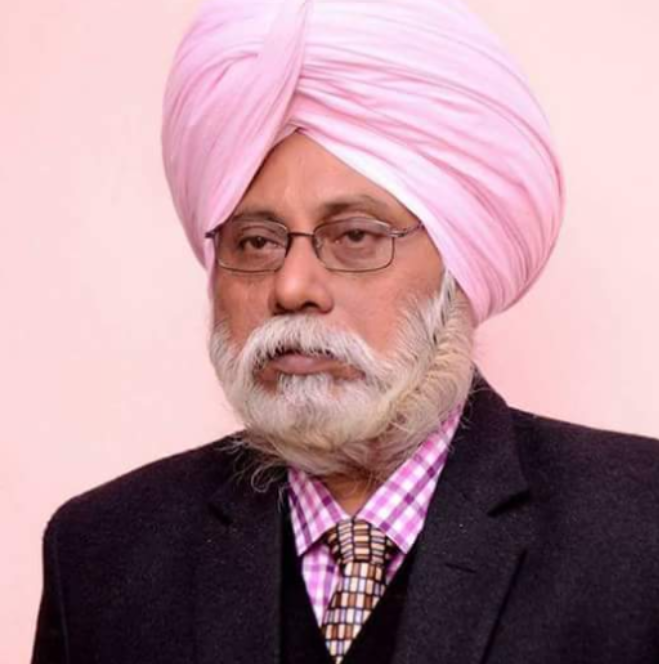
- Born: 15 January 1955 (age 71); ALAMGIR, District Ludhiana, State Punjab, India
- Citizenship: India
- Education: Doctorate of Philosophy in English
- Occupations: Teacher, Poet, Author, Philosopher, Environmentalist
- Years active: 1973-Present
- Awards: Charter of Morava (2023) from the Association of Writers of Serbia, Doctor of Philosophy (Honoris Causa-2024) from University of Engineering and Management Jaipur
- Website: https://ethicsacademy.co.in/ | http://worldliterature.in/

Dr. Jernail Singh Anand is an Indian poet, columnist, and environmental activist. He has written 140 books of English poetry, fiction, non-fiction and spiritual writing.

He retired as Principal and is now the Honorary Professor Emeritus at the Institute of European Roma Studies and Research, Crimes Against Humanity and International Law, Belgrade, Serbia. He is also an honorary member of the Association of Serbian Writers. Dr. Anand co-developed the theory of Bio-Text in Critical Theory, along with Iranian scholar Dr. Roghayeh Farsi, chief coordinator of a research project on the Anand's poetry initiated by the University of Neyshabur, Iran.

== Early life and education ==
Born in 1955 at Ludhiana, Punjab and grew up at native village Longowal in the Sangrur, Punjab, Anand graduated from Govt. College, Ludhiana, and earned his master's degree in English Literature from Punjabi University, Patiala. Punjab University, Chandigarh awarded him a Doctor of Philosophy degree in 2000 for his work on mysticism in the poetry of Walt Whitman and Puran Singh.

== Career ==
Anand began his career as a lecturer in English at Gujranwala Guru Nanak Khalsa College in Ludhiana, before becoming the principal at the DAV College in Bathinda, where he served for 10 years. He represented India at the World Institute of Peace Nigeria organized World Peace Seminar in November 2016.

During his career, he served on the boards of educational societies including the Senate and Syndicate of Punjabi University, and Board of Studies of Guru Kashi University. Anand has authored 140 books, published 120 articles, published various national and international anthologies, and written forewords for a number of books by other poets.

Anand is also a climate activist, leading a tree-planting campaign in Bathinda, Punjab, in association with the 27th Battalion of the Indo-Tibetan Border Police, as part of the 'My Earth My Duty' initiative, instigated by the Ministry of Youth Affairs and Sports, which saw 21,000 saplings planted in the region. He subsequently continued with this campaign, planting approximately 100,000 saplings across the Punjab region.

== Awards and recognition ==
- Member of the Commission for the International Best Poet Award 2017 of the World Nations Writers Union, Kazakhstan
- First Ambassador of the World Union of Poets, Italy.
- Chairperson of World Foundation for Peace, and Writers International Foundation
- Dr Anand evolved the theory of BIOTEXT in Literary Theory
- Cross for Peace for his Lifetime Achievement in the Field of Poetry and Peace by World Union of Poets.
