= Andrea Brady =

American poet and lecturer at Queen Mary

- Born: 12 August 1974 (age 52); Philadelphia
- Education: Columbia University; University of Cambridge
- Occupations: Poet, lecturer
- Writing career
- Genre: Poetry

Andrea Brady (born 1974 in Philadelphia) is an American poet and lecturer at Queen Mary. She studied at Columbia University and the University of Cambridge. Her academic work focuses on contemporary poetry and the early modern period. She is the curator of the Archive of the Now and the co-editor (with Keston Sutherland) of Barque Press.

== Publications ==
=== Poetry ===
- Vacation of a Lifetime (Cambridge: Salt, 2001).
- Embrace (Glasgow: Object Permanence, 2005).
- Wildfire: A Verse Essay (San Francisco: Krupskaya, 2010).
- Mutability: Scripts for Infancy (Seagull Books, 2013)
- Cut from the Rushes (Hastings: Reality Street, 2013).
- Dompteuse (Toronto: Bookthug, 2014).
- The Strong Room (London: Crater Press, 2016).
- Desiring Machines (Boiler House Press, 2021).
- The Blue Split Compartments (Wesleyan University Press, 2021).

=== Criticism ===
- English Funerary Elegy in the Seventeenth Century: Laws in Mourning (2006) ISBN 140394105X
- The Uses of the Future in Early Modern Europe, co-ed. with Emily Butterworth (2009) ISBN 041599540X
- Poetry and Bondage: A History of Lyric and Constraint (2021) ISBN 9781108990684
- Radical Tenderness: Poetry in Times of Catastrophe (2024) ISBN 9781009393430
