= Drew Milne =

British poet and academic

Drew Milne is a contemporary British poet and academic.

== Published works ==
Milne’s books of poetry include Sheet Mettle (Alfred David Editions, 1994), Bench Marks (Alfred David Editions, 1998), The Damage: new and selected poems (Salt, 2001), Mars Disarmed (The Figures, 2002), and Go Figure (Salt, 2003). His work is also featured in collections and anthologies, notably Conductors of Chaos, edited by Iain Sinclair (Picador, 1996) and Anthology of Twentieth-Century British and Irish Poetry edited by Keith Tuma (Oxford University Press, 2001). He edits the occasional journal Parataxis: modernism and modern writing and the poetry imprint Parataxis Editions. He co-edited Marxist Literary Theory: A Reader (Blackwell, 1996) with Terry Eagleton, and has edited the anthology Modern Critical Thought (Blackwell, 2003). He published Agoraphobic Poetics: Essays on Contemporary Poetry (Salt, 2009), and his collected poems, In Darkest Capital, were published by Carcanet in 2017.

== See also ==
- British Poetry Revival
