= Miriam Sagan =

American poet

Miriam Sagan (born April 27, 1954, in Manhattan, New York) is a U.S. poet, as well as an essayist, memoirist and teacher. She is the author of over a dozen books, and lives and works in Santa Fe, New Mexico. She is a founding member of the collaborative press Tres Chicas Books.

A graduate of Harvard with an M.A. in creative writing from Boston University, Sagan was one of the editors of the Boston area-based Aspect Magazine with Ed Hogan. In 1980 Hogan shut Aspect down and he, Sagan and others founded Zephyr Press.

She has been a writer in residence in four national parks, Yaddo, MacDowell, Gulkistan in Iceland, Kura Studio in Japan, and other interesting and remote places. She founded and directed the creative writing program at Santa Fe Community College.

Her intergenerational collaborative team, Maternal Mitochondria (with Isabel Winson-Sagan), has produced text installations in venues ranging from abandoned buildings to galleries to RV parks. Miriam's work has been incised on stoneware as part of two haiku pathways, set to music for the Santa Fe Women's Ensemble, and left in Little Free Libraries across the country.

== Works ==
- The Art of Love: New and Selected Poems. La Alameda Press. 1994. ISBN 978-0963190925.
- Dirty Laundry: 100 Days in a Zen Monastery. New World Library. 1999. ISBN 978-1577311058.
- Unbroken Line: Writing in the Lineage of Poetry. Sherman Asher Publishing. 1999. ISBN 978-1-890932-08-4.
- Archeology Of Desire. Red Hen Press. 2001. ISBN 978-1-888996-32-6.
- The Widow's Coat. Ahsahta Press. 2002. ISBN 978-0916272678.
- Searching For A Mustard Seed: One Young Widow's Unconventional Story. Quality Words In Print. 2003. ISBN 978-0-9713160-3-4.
- Rag Trade: Poems. La Alameda Press. 2004. ISBN 978-1-888809-42-8.
- Gossip. Small Press Distribution, Tres Chicas Books. 2007. ISBN 978-1-893003-11-8.
- Map Of The Lost. University of New Mexico Press. 2008. ISBN 978-0-8263-4160-0.
- Love & Death:Greatest Hits. Small Press Distribution, Tres Chicas Books. 2011. ISBN 978-1-893003-03-3.
- Seven Places in America: A Poetic Sojourn. Sherman Asher Publishing. 2015. ISBN 978-1890932428.
- Black Rainbow. Sherman Asher Publishing. 2015. ISBN 978-1890932480.
- Swimming in Reykjavik. Baba Builders. 2015.
- Luminosity. Duck Lake Books. 2019. ISBN 978-1943900084.
- Bluebeard's Castle. Red Mountain Press. 2019. ISBN 978-1732650138.
- A Hundred Cups Of Coffee. Tres Chicas Books. 2019. ISBN 978-1893003231.
- Beasts. Red Mountain Press. 2020. ISBN 978-1732650169.
- Star Gazing: Poems of Astronomy. Cholla Needles. 2020. ISBN 979-8651830473.
- In The Monastery of Fragrance and Panic Poems. 2021. ISBN 978-9390601523.
- Shadow on the Minotaur. Red Mountain Press. 2021. ISBN 978-1952204050.
- Start Again. Red Mountain Press. 2022. ISBN 978-1952204241.
- Stash. Cyberwit. 2022. ISBN 978-8182539266.
- Castaway. Red Mountain Press. 2023. ISBN 978-1952204159.
- Border Line: 101 Haiku. Cholla Needles. 2023. ISBN 979-8369733356.
- Music for Monoliths. Cyberwit. 2023. ISBN 978-8119228874.
- Commune of the Golden Sun. Cholla Needles. 2024. ISBN 979-8369733356.
