= Literary Death Match =

International English-language reading series

- Logo for the Literary Death Match
- Genre: Reading series
- Created by: Todd Zuniga; Elizabeth Koch; Dennis DiClaudio
- No. of seasons: 8

Production
- Executive producers: Suzanne Azzopardi; Kirsten Sims; Morgan Macgregor
- Producers: Sarah Moeding; Brian Martin; Vikki Reilly
- Production locations: New York City; San Francisco; London

Original release
- Release: March 6, 2006

Literary Death Match is a reading series co-created in 2006 by Todd Zuniga, Elizabeth Koch, and Dennis DiClaudio. Each event features four readers who read their own writing for seven minutes or less, and are then critiqued by three judges (often actors, comedians, authors, musicians or dancers) in the categories of literary merit, performance and intangibles. The winner is then decided by a literary-skewed, game show-type finale to decide who wins the Literary Death Match crown.

== Locations ==
The Literary Death Match has occurred regularly in New York City, San Francisco and London, and has been produced in a total of 37 cities around the world, including Los Angeles, Chicago, Boston, Miami and Dallas in the United States, Calgary, Toronto and Montreal in Canada, as well as Dublin, Paris, Edinburgh, Beijing, Vilnius and Shanghai. On September 7, 2011, the event presented its 1,000th participant in Glasgow (Cargo Publishing's Allan Wilson).

=== United States ===
In the United States, the event has featured readers Tom Perrotta (author of Election, Little Children), Daniel Handler (a.k.a. Lemony Snicket) and The Believer editor Heidi Julavits and judges like Pulitzer Prize winners Richard Russo and Jennifer Egan, 24's Mary Lynn Rajskub, supermodel Paulina Porizkova, and the musician Moby.

=== Europe ===
In Europe, the event has featured readers Joe Dunthorne (author of Submarine), Esther Freud (Hideous Kinky), Nikesh Shukla (C4 Comedy Labs' Kabadasses creator), comedy writers David Quantick and Robert Popper, and judges Rich Fulcher (The Mighty Boosh), model-turned-author Sara J. Stockbridge, comedian Josie Long, Sichuan chef Fuchsia Dunlop, Kaiser Chiefs drummer Nick Hodgson and Irish musician Cathy Davey.

== Accolades ==
In 2008, Literary Death Match was named "Best Scribbler Smackdown" by the San Francisco Bay Guardian "Best of the Bay" awards. In 2010, Interview said "Events like Literary Death Match are helping to revitalize the coolitude of the printed word."

== History ==
Name	Date	Location	Judges	Participants	Winner
Blindfolded Stabbing	March 6, 2006	New York City	Ben Greenman (The New Yorker), Moby, and comedian Jack Kukoda	Bryan Charles (Open City), Deb Olin Unferth (Noon), Geoff Wolinetz (Yankee Pot Roast), Mike Sacks (as read by Ted Travelstead) reading for Sweet Fancy Moses	Ted Travelstead
Mathematical Rumble	April 10, 2006	New York City	Ben Greenman (The New Yorker), comedian Jack Kukoda and Ted Travelstead (Sweet Fancy Moses, LDM Champ)	Shya Scanlon (elimae), Kristin McGonigle (Pindeldyboz), Manuel Munoz (Swink), Pauls Toutonghi (One Story)	Manuel Munoz
Geographical Violence	May 22, 2006	New York City	Adrian Todd Zuniga (founding editor, Opium Magazine), Ben Greenman (The New Yorker) and David Goodwillie (Seemed Like a Good Idea at the Time)	Sean Casey (McSweeney's), Tyler Gore (MeThree), Andy Horwitz (Nerve), Thomas Hopkins (Quick Fiction)	Sean Casey
Running for Their Lives	June 7, 2006	Washington Square Park, NYC	Ben Greenman (The New Yorker), Dennis DiClaudio (Comedy Central) and Opium's soccer pundit, Ben Mainwaring.	Opium's own Adrian Todd Zuniga, Elizabeth Koch, associate editor Heather Kelley and two-time Opium print writer, Shya Scanlon	Adrian Todd Zuniga
Rumble in the Bay	July 17, 2007	Harlot, San Francisco	Jon Wolanske (Killing My Lobster), Beth Lisick (author of Everyone into the Pool), and ZYZZYVA editor Howard Junker	Stephen Elliott (McSweeney's, Canteen), Joyce Maynard (Canteen), Michelle Richmond (Fiction Attic Press) and Sam Hurwitt (Kitchen Sink)	Sam Hurwitt
Hara-Kari Haiku at Harlot	August 21, 2007	San Francisco	SF Chronicle's Oscar Villalon judging literary merit, Kasper Hauser's Rob Baedeker on performance, and Levine Greenburg literary agent Danielle Svetcov on intangibles	Matt Herlihy (Sweet Fancy Moses), Andy Raskin (Big Ugly Review), Kirk Read (Instant City), Andrew O. Dugas (edifice WRECKED)	Kirk Read
Cyrillic Battle to the Death	September 19, 2007	The Rickshaw Stop, San Francisco	Jesse McKinley (New York Times), Anika Streitfeld (Random House) and Matt Herlihy (Sweet Fancy Moses)	Bucky Sinister (Progressive Reading Series), Regina Louise (Inside Story Time), Carol Queen (Writer's With Drinks), Kelly Beardsley (Porchlight Entertainment)	Bucky Sinister
Litquake Hoop-a-Lot	October 12, 2007	Swedish American Hall, San Francisco	literary merit judge Ben Greenman, performance judge Shaun Landry (Oui Be Negroes) and Oscar Villalon (SF Chronicle) speaking to intangibles	Evany Thomas (McSweeney's), Wesley Stace (Swink), Daniel Handler, Gary Kamiya (Salon.com)	Daniel Handler
NYC Cyrillithon	October 23, 2007	The Kitchen, New York City	Ben Greenman (The New Yorker), Amanda Stern (host of the Happy Ending Reading Series) and Joshua Furst (Short People)	Giancarlo DiTrapano (New York Tyrant), Susan Buttenwieser (failbetter), Pedro Ponce (Quick Fiction and Thomas Cooper (Opium Magazine)	Giancarlo DiTrapano
Death Matching Thy Lobster	November 6, 2007	Harlot, San Francisco	Michelle Richmond (The Year of the Fog), Kurt Bodden (Talk Show Live) and Sean Finney (Canteen)	Four actors from the legendary Killing My Lobster comedy troupe stormed the stage and read from past print issues of Opium Magazine: Jon Wolanske, Eric Schniewinde, Joel Dovev and Todd Brotze	Jon Wolanske
Naming that Tune	March 12, 2008	Rickshaw Stop, San Francisco	Larry Gallagher, Helena Echlin and Laura Lee Mattingly	Daphne Gottlieb (Soft Skull Press), Jon Longhi (Manic D Press), Eric B. Martin (MacAdam/Cage) and Andrew Lam (Heyday Books)	Andrew Lam
Poets Doubling as Madmen	April 9, 2008	Rickshaw Stop, San Francisco	Jane Ganahl (Litquake co-founder), Mia Lipman (Canteen) and Alan Black	Clive Matson (publisher of the Crazy Child Scribbler), Andrew O. Dugas (Unlikely Stories), Rupert Estanislao (Suicide Kings) and Justin Chin (Manic D Press)	Rupert Estanislao
Pin the Body on the Head!	May 10, 2008	Rickshaw Stop, San Francisco	Stephen Elliott (Happy Baby), Kurt Bodden (Talk Show Live), Michelle Richmond (The Year of the Fog), Jon Wolanske (Killing My Lobster), Sean Finney (Canteen) and Todd Zuniga (LDM's co-creator)	Kirk Read (episode 2's winner), Andrew Lam (episode 7's winner), Tony DuShane (episode 6 winner) and Sam Hurwitt (episode 1 Winner)	Andrew Lam
Recyclement Extravaganza	May 29, 2008	Housing Works, New York City	Ben Greenman of The New Yorker, comedian Joel Dovev and the first-ever mute judges in LDM history, Street Performers Gill and Jill Bumby	Aaron Garretson (representing Opium), Bob Powers (Lost Magazine), Cole Kazdin (Smith Magazine) and Garth Hallberg (Canteen Magazine)	Aaron Garreston
Urban Sack Race Antics	June 26, 2008	Sara D. Roosevelt Park, New York City	Ben Greenman (The New Yorker), writer/comedian Julie Klausner and Jeff Gordinier (X Saves the World)	John Williams (Titlepage.tv), Debbie Kuan (Wigleaf), Gabrielle Mitchell-Marell (Anderbo.com) and Amy Shearn (Brick Magazine's representative and the author of How Far is the Ocean from Here)	John Williams
Mathematizing and Literacy	July 24, 2008	Amnesia, San Francisco	Damion Searls, Litquake's Elise Proulx and Tony DuShane.	Matt Rohrer (Watchword Press), Lisa K. Buchanan (Missouri Review), Alan Black (Redroom.com) and Evan Rehill (Instant City).	Alan Black
Literary Scavengry	September 19, 2008	Amnesia, San Francisco	Gravity Goldberg of Instant City, Jack Boulware of Litquake and Ian Lendler	Kim Addonizio (Litquake), Rhea DeRose-Weiss (Whore Magazine), Damion Searls (n+1) and Tom Barbash (One Story)	Kim Addonizio
Lightnin' & Rasslin' (part of Lit Crawl NYC)	September 27, 2008	Supreme Trading, Brooklyn NY	The New Yorker's Ben Greenman, Opium's .com editor Cicily Janus and Aussie scribe Lee Bob Black	Timmy Waldron (Word Riot), Jensen Whelan (Hobart), Christina Kallery (Failbetter) and Tim Mucci (Slice Magazine)	Timmy Waldron
Litquake Duel to the Death	October 6, 2008	San Francisco			
Invisible Bullets Near Broadway	October 14, 2008	The Kitchen, New York City	The New Yorker's Ben Greenman, SF improviser Kurt Bodden and Kansas comediess Jodi Bullock	Dennis DiClaudio (Guerilla Lit Reading Series), Lincoln Michel (L Magazine Literary Upstart), Katherine Taylor (Vermin on the Mount Reading Series) and Thaddeus Rutkowski (Poetry vs. Comedy)	Dennis DiClaudio
TV Money Grabstravaganza	November 11, 2008	Housing Works Bookstore, New York City	Ben Greenman (The New Yorker), Lesley Arfin (Dear Diary) and comedian Todd Levin	Tao Lin (Muumuu House), Amy Sohn (Brooklyn Writers Space), Mishna Wolff (Swink) and Alex Rose	Tao Lin
Fowl Language	November 14, 2008	Amnesia, San Francisco	Jonathon Keats, Leslie Waggoner, and Robin Ekiss	Jeff O’Keefe (Epoch Magazine), Vince Donovan (Fiction Attic), James Hass (Farallon Review) and Joshua Citrak (Slouch Magazine)	Joshua Citrak
Shakespeare & Hoops	January 9, 2008	The Elbo Room, New York City	Andrew Leland (The Believer), Melanie Case (Killing My Lobster) and James Hass (The Farallon Review)	Jaynel Attolini (Six Word Memoirs on Love and Heartbreak), Katie Crouch (Tin House), Veronica Chater (Memoir) and Rodes Fishburne (Going To See the Elephant)	Veronica Charter
Windy City Cartography Gouge	February 11, 2009	The Hideout, Chicago	Kevin Guilfoile, Matt Herlihy (founder of Sweet Fancy Moses) and Mark Bazer (The Interview Show)	Rachel Yoder (Quick Fiction), Megan Stielstra (Dollar Store Reading Series), Julius Kalamarz (Juked), Gwendolyn Knapp (Hayden's Ferry Review), Holly Wilson (The Southeast Review) and Aaron Burch (Hobart)	Megan Stielstra
Democratic Lit Music Off	February 13, 2009	San Francisco	Jonathan Keats, conceptual artist	Luke Sykora, Melissa Hansen	Luke Sykora
Learn How to Draw	February 18, 2009	The Slipper Room, New York City	Ben Greenman (The New Yorker), Amy Sohn (My Old Man) and Joshua Lyon (Pill Head)	Andrew Sean Greer, Cintra Wilson, Elliott Holt (The Kenyon Review) and Christopher Monks (McSweeney's)	Cintra Wilson
Holy City Zoo-Down	March 13, 2009	San Francisco	Trina Robbins, Lisa Geduldig and Andrew Leland	Bucky Sinister (reading Tao Lin, A Poem Written by a Bear), Candy Churilla (reading John Cheever, Reunion), Will Durst (reading Donald Barthleme, The School) and Paco Romane (reading George Saunders, In Persuasion Nation)	Will Durst
Bookworm Festival Brawl	March 14, 2009	The Bookworm, Beijing	Jen Hyde (Small Anchor Press), Ben Foster (G2 Studios) and John Leary (fiction writer featured in Opium4, Opium1)	James West of Australia(Beijing Blur), Liz Niven of Scotland, Ridley Pearson of the US and Zachary Mexico of the USA (China Underground)	Liz Niven
Rebellious Vibrations	April 10, 2009	The Elbo Room, San Francisco	Michael Layne Heath, Lorelei Lee, Jason Myers and Blag Dahlia	Jonathan Keats, Kimi Recor and Benjamin L. Perez	Lorelei Lee
Rocky Mountain Bladebath	April 14, 2009	Mercury Cafe, Denver	Daniel Grandbois, Laura Pritchett, Teague Bohlen and Kathy Fish	David Hicks, PhD, Jody Reale and Shawn Owen Hazelwood	Daniel Grandbois
Baseball Chopstick War	April 23, 2009	Pianos, New York City	B.C. Edwards (pax Americana), Cheryl Wagner (Five Dials), Amy Lawless (Black Maze Books), Heidi Julavits (The Believer)	Anna deVries (Scribner), Scott Adsit (30 Rock) and Richard Lawson (Gawker)	B.C. Edwards
Yo' Mama's So Literary...	May 8, 2009	The Elbo Room, San Francisco	Ellen Sussman (Word for Word), Peter Orner (A Public Space), Jesse Nathan (Milk Machine) and April Sinclair (Single Woman of a Certain Age)	Andrew Leland (The Believer), Eve Batey (SF Appeal) and Andy Raskin (The Ramen King and I)	April Sinclair
Literary Tea Party	May 21, 2009	The Paradise Lounge, Boston	Jane Roper (Memoirious), Steve Almond (Grub Street), William Giraldi (AGNI) and Jeannie Greeley (Stuff Boston)	Eve Bridburg (Grub Street founder), Tom Perrotta (The Abstinence Teacher and Election) and Christopher Monks (The Game Guide to Your Life)	Jeannie Greeley
NYC Poets & Madmen Both	May 27, 2009	Pianos, New York City	Rivka Galchen (Atmospheric Disturbances), Josh Weil (The New Valley), Anthony Tognazzini (BOA Editions) and Michael Muhammad Knight (Soft Skull Press)	Ben Greenberg, comedian Chelsea Peretti, Chris March	Michael Muhammad Knight
LDM University Recycled Hoop-Off!	June 5, 2009	Syracuse University	Mi Detmar (Stone Canoe), Roy Kesey, Dan Roche (Le Moyne College) and Alex Yates (representing Salt Hill)	Chris Kennedy, Elizabeth Koch and Phil Lamarche	Roy Kesey
SF Infinite Jesticulation	June 12, 2009	Elbo Room, San Francisco	Jim Nelson (Instant City), K.M. Soehnlein (Switchback), Eric Puchner and Katharine Noel (Canteen) and Michelle Richmond	Ayelet Waldman (Bad Mother), playwright Peter Sinn Nachtrieb, and Josh Kornbluth	K.M. Soehnlein
NYC Bowery, Poetry, Infinity	June 25, 2009	Bowery Poetry Club, New York City	Luna Lemus (Like Son), Lisa Carver (Drugs Are Nice), Julie Metz's (Perfection) and Zachary Mexico (China Underground)	Ben Adams, an editor at Bloomsbury, comedian Todd Barry (known for this roles in The Wrestler and Flight of the Conchords), and Vice Magazine co-founder Gavin McInnes	Julie Metz
London: episode 1	–	Old Queen's Head, London	Luke Brown (Tindal Street Press), Laura Dockrill, and Tim Clare (Aisle16)	Amber Marks (Book Club Boutique), Joe Dunthorne (English Writers Football Team), Tim Wells (Pen Pusher Magazine), and Nick Harkaway (BBC Radio 3's The Verb)	Amber Marks
New York City: episode 16	–	New York City, New York	Michael Musto, Brant Rumble (Scribner), and comedian Bob Powers	Abraham Smith (Spinning Jenny), Luke Dempsey (Bloomsbury USA), Donald Breckenridge (Brooklyn Rail), and Gigantic's Yuka Igarashi	Abraham Smith
Chicago: episode 3	–	Chicago, Illinois	Nami Mun (Miles from Nowhere), artist Jay Ryan, and Barry Hite (iO, Second City, Annoyance Theaters).	Spencer Dew (THE2NDHAND), Adam Levin (Ninth Letter), Gabriel Gudding (MAKE), Febronio Zatarain (contratiempo), Simone Muench (POETRY), Kathleen Rooney (Switchback Books), Paul Killebrew (Canarium Books), and Michael Czyzniejewski (Another Chicago Magazine)	Spencer Dew
Los Angeles: episode 1	–	Cinespace, Los Angeles	Mark Sarvas (The Elegant Variation), Sarah Thyre (Strangers with Candy and author of Dark at the Roots) and Alison Becker (Mayne Street)	Rich Ferguson (The Nervous Breakdown), Joshua Lyon (Hyperion), Chris "Whitey" Erickson (Flatmancrooked), Melinda Hill	Rich Ferguson
Denver: episode 2		Forest Room 5, Denver	Chris Ransick (Denver's Poet Laureate), Curtis Pesman and Tara Anderson (Lijit Networks)	Nick Franciose (Lighthouse Writers), Jessy Randall (Ghost Road), Sharon McGill (Monday Night), Nicky Beer (Copper Nickel)	Nick Franciose
Seattle: episode 1		Jewel Box Theater, Seattle	Mary Guterson (Gone to the Dogs), Lindy West (The Stranger), and Luke Smith (Bungie)	Ryan Boudinot (Monkeybicycle), Matthew Simmons (HTMLGiant), Matt Briggs (Reading Local: Seattle), Peter Gajdics.(New York Tyrant)	Matthew Simmons
The Battle Of The Independent Bookstores		San Francisco	Andrew Lam, Beth Spotswood, and Scott Sigler (Borderland Books)	Jade Brooks (City Lights), Derek Powazek (The Booksmith), Alvin Orloff (Dog Eared Books), Paul Neilan (Green Apple Books)	Paul Neilan
New York City: episode 17		New York City	Scott Jacobson (The Daily Show), Ethan Nosowsky (Graywolf Press) and Tony Arcabascio (Alife's co-founder)	Janice Erlbaum (GIRLBOMB), Elisa Albert (The Book of Dahlia), Blaise Allysen Kearsley (How I Learned reading series), David Ellis Dickerson	Elisa Albert
San Francisco: episode 21		Elbo Room, San Francisco	Elissa Bassist, Dan Klein (Kasper Hauser), Stacey Lewis (City Lights)	Tracy Clark-Flory, Genie Gratto, Jack Boulware (Litquake), Noria Joblanski	Tracy Clark-Flory
Raleigh: episode 1		Pour House, Raleigh	Rhett and Link, Daniel Wallace, and KGBebe	Jodi Lynn Villers, Scott McClanahan, Billy Warden, Jeff Polish	Jodi Lynn Villers
London: episode 2		Queen of Hoxton, London	Damian Barr (Get It Together), Fuchsia Dunlop, and Amy Lamé	Ashna Sarkar, Tom Chivers, Musa Okwonga, and Craig Taylor (Five Dials)	Ashna Sarkar
New York City: episode 18		Bowery Poetry Club, New York	Franklin Bruno (The Mountain Goats), Ben Schafer (DeCapo Press), and Carla Rhodes	Christopher R. Weingarten, James Gavin, Jessica Hopper, and Courtney Gillette	Courtney Gillette
Paris: episode 1		Le Reservoir, Paris	David Foenkinos, Yorgos Archimandritis, and Bo	Mohamed Razane, Max Monnehay, Philippe Jaenada, and Frédéric Beigbeder	Mohamed Razane
LDM: Litquake	October 14, 2009	Verdi Club, San Francisco	artist Paul Madonna, actress/poet Amber Tamblyn, David Wiegand (San Francisco Chronicle)	Tod Goldberg (Other Resort Cities), Lynka Adams (A Skeleton at the Feast), Frances Dinkelspiel (Towers of Gold), and James Nestor	James Nestor
New York City: episode 19	September 29, 2009	Bowery Poetry Club	Grove Atlantic's Amy Hundley, The Colbert Report's Peter Grosz (also featured in Sonic commercials), and Gabe Liedman	David Henry Sterry (Hos, Hookers, Call-Girls, and Rent Boys: Prostitutes Writing on Life, Love, Work, Sex, and Money), Sarah Jane Stratford (author of The Midnight Guardian), David Hollander, and Robert Lopez (author of Part of the World)	Robert Lopez
LDM: Texas Book Festival	October 31, 2009	The Sanctuary, Austin	Jane Smiley, Richard Russo, and Owen Egerton	Amelia Gray (author, AM/PM), Kyle Beachy (The Slide), Jeff Martin (editor, The Customer is Always Wrong), and Jason Sheehan (Cooking Dirty: A Story of Life, Sex, Love and Death in the Kitchen)	Amelia Gray
London: episode 3	November 3, 2009	Old Queen's Head, London	Will Skidelsky (book editor for The Independent), Sara J. Stockbridge, and Molly Parkin	Matthew De Abaitua (The Idler), Ross Sutherland, John Grindrod (representing Faber), and Nathan Jones (Mercy)	Matthew De Abaitua
Oxford: episode 1	November 4, 2009	Corner Club	poet Kate Clanchy, Dan Kieran (author and editor of The Idler), and musician Ben Walker	George Chopping (author of collections Derailed and Shelf Life), Miranda Ward, Jake Wallis Simons (author of The Exiled Times of a Tibetan Jew) and Megan Kerr	George Chopping
Seattle, Ep 2: "Nonsensical Animal Toss"	November 11, 2009		Paul Constant (The Stranger), Maria Semple (former writer for Arrested Development, Jonathan Evison (All About Lulu)	Aaron Dietz (KNOCK), Stacey Levine (My Horse and Other Stories), playwright Kelleen Conway Blanchard (Small Town) and Danbert Nobacon (Chumbawamba)	Kelleen Conway Blanchard
Portland, Ep 1	November 2009		Chelsea Cain (author, Evil at Heart), Scott Poole (author, Hiding from Salesmen) and Zia McCabe (The Dandy Warhols)	Michael Parker (author, Our Beloved 26th), Jeff Hardison (Back Fence), Arthur Bradford (author, Dogwalker) and Kerry Cohen (author, Loose Girl)	Arthur Bradford
San Francisco, episode 23	November 2009		Arline Klatt (Porchlight), cartoonist Michael Capozzola, and Todd Zniga (Opium founder)	Charlie Haas (The Enthusiast), Shanthi Sekaran (The Prayer Room), Seth Harwood (Jack Wakes Up) and D.W. Lichtenberg (The Ancient Book of Hip)	D.W. Lichtenberg
New York City, episode 20: Nerf-machine-gun Assault	2009		Terese Svoboda (Weapons Grade), performance artist Joseph Keckler, Mishna Wolf (I'm Down)	Sarah Walker (Really, You've Done Enough), Edith Zimmerman (Esquire, Heeb, others) Teddy Wayne (Kapitoil) and Jon Friedman (The Rejection Show).	Edith Zimmerman
San Francisco, episode 24	December 11, 2009	Elbo Room	Chicken John, Isaac Fitzgerald (managing editor, The Rumpus), Nina Lesowitz (Spinergy Group, Litquake)	Derek Powazek (founder, Fray Magazine), Lynka Adams, Beth Spotswood (SF Appeal and SFGate) and Elissa Bassist (The Rumpus.net)	Beth Spotswood
New York City, episode 21	December 2009		Ben Greenman (The New Yorker), Devorah Rose (Social Life Magazine) and Jared Bloom (Full Ginsburg)	James Yeh (Gigantic), Jason Helm, Terese Svoboda (Weapons Grade) and Elna Baker (The New York Regional Mormon Singles Halloween Dance)	Elna Baker
San Francisco, episode 25: The Bell Jar Charades	January 8, 2010	Elbo Room	Michelle Tea (author, TransForming Community), Ali Liebegott (The IHOP Papers) and Twitter novelist Matt Stewart (The French Revolution)	Laura Joyce Davis, science comedian Brian Malow, cartoonist Michael Capozzola and Matty Byloos and Josh Atlas	Matty Byloos and Josh Atlas
Boston, episode 2: Musical Chairs	January 13, 2010		Billy Giraldi (writer, senior fiction editor, AGNI), Audrey Ryan and comedian Lamont Price	Janaka Stucky (Handsome), Michelle Hoover (Night Train), Elisa Gabbert (Open Letters) and Steven Brykman (National Lampoon)	Janaka Stucky
Chicago, episode 4: Draw the Judges	January 14, 2010	Fizz	author Kathleen Rooney, rockstress and critic Jessica Hopper, and Shawn Smith (Shawnimals)	James Kennedy (The Order of Odd-Fish), Rebekah Silverman (Artifice), Andy Farkas (Subito Press) and Davis Schneiderman (&NOW)	James Kennedy
Dallas, episode 1: Fling-the-Foamskin	January 15, 2010	Dallas Museum of Art	Ben Fountain (author, Brief Encounters with Che Guevara), Tina Parker and Owen Egerton (How Best to Avoid Dying)	Katherine Center (author, Everyone is Beautiful), Amelia Gray (author, AM/PM), Will Clarke (author, Lord Vishnu's Love Handles: A Spy Novel, Sort Of) and William Razavi	Will Clarke
New York City, episode 22: Awards Acceptance Speech-Off	January 21, 2010	Bowery Poetry Club	Caitlin Roper (managing editor, The Paris Review), musician Emily Zuzik, writer Jessica Grose	Nelly Reifler (SWEET: Actors Reading Writers), Daniel Nester (author, How To Be Inappropriate), Christopher Kennedy (New York Tyrant) and Michael Atkinson (author, Hemingway Deadlights	Nelly Reifler
Baltimore, episode 1: Draw the Judges	January 30, 2010	Windup Space	Michael Kimball (author, Dear Everybody), Rafael Alvarez (The Wire) and Carolyn Zaikowski (author, A Child Is Being Killed)	Mike Young (author, We Are All Good If They Try Hard Enough), Dave Housley (Barrelhouse), Jen Michalski (jmww) and Michael M. Hughes (CityLit)	Mike Young
San Francisco, episode 26: Chocolates and famous love writers	February 12, 2010	Elbo Room	Douglas McGray (editor-in-chief, Pop-Up Magazine), Peter Finch (KFog Radio), humorist Janine Brito	Dylan Schaffer (Life, Death and Bialys), Michelle Tea (Valencia), Samantha Schoech (The Bigger the Better, the Tighter the Sweater), Joshua Mohr (Some Things that Meant the World to Me)	Dylan Schaffer
New York City, episode 23: Faintly Mardi-Gras Themed	February 18, 2010	Bowery Poetry Club	Rob Spillman (editor, Tin House), Sini Anderson, Cintra Wilson (author, Caligula for President)	Gladstone ("Hate By Numbers"), poet Melissa Broder (When You Say One Thing But Mean Your Mother), Elyssa East (author, Dogtown: Death and Enchantment in a New England Ghost Town) and Joanna Rakoff (author, A Fortunate Age)	Wayne Gladstone
Washington D.C., episode 1: Capital	February 2, 2011	The Black Cat	Jennine Capó Crucet (author, How to Leave Hialeah), Delaney Williams, (actor, The Wire), Chris Richards (The Washington Post)	David Wanczyk (The Written Wardrobe), Regie Cabico, Rae Bryant, Matt Bell	David Wanczyk
Washington D.C., episode 2: Max Brod	November 8, 2011	DC9	Karen Sommer Shalett (editor, DC Magazine), S.M. Shrake, (co-founder, Story League), Justin Purvis	Sean Carman (The Huffington Post), Sacha Scoblic, Vijai Nathan, Jamaal May	Sacha Scoblic
Beijing, episode 3	September 11, 2013	The Bookworm, Beijing	Alice Xin Liu, Vicky Mohieddeen, Sherwin Jiang	Anthony Tao (Beijing Cream), Leslie-Ann Murray, Tom Carter, Stanley Chan	Leslie-Ann Murray
