= Ciclacillin =

Chemical compound

Clinical data
- AHFS/Drugs.com: International Drug Names
- Routes of administration: Oral
- ATC code: none

Pharmacokinetic data
- Bioavailability: Moderate
- Protein binding: <25%

Identifiers
- IUPAC name: (2S,5R,6R)-6-{[(1-aminocyclohexyl)carbonyl]amino}- 3,3-dimethyl-7-oxo-4-thia-1-azabicyclo[3.2.0]heptane- 2-carboxylic acid
- CAS Number: 3485-14-1
- PubChem CID: 19003
- IUPHAR/BPS: 4817
- DrugBank: DB01000
- ChemSpider: 17941
- UNII: 72ZJ154X86
- KEGG: D01334
- ChEBI: CHEBI:31444
- ChEMBL: ChEMBL1200356
- CompTox Dashboard (EPA): DTXSID9022861
- ECHA InfoCard: 100.020.429

Chemical and physical data
- Formula: C_{15}H_{23}N_{3}O_{4}S
- Molar mass: 341.43 g·mol^{−1}
- 3D model (JSmol): Interactive image
- SMILES: O=C(O)[C@@H]2N3C(=O)[C@@H](NC(=O)C1(N)CCCCC1)[C@H]3SC2(C)C
- InChI: InChI=1S/C15H23N3O4S/c1-14(2)9(12(20)21)18-10(19)8(11(18)23-14)17-13(22)15(16)6-4-3-5-7-15/h8-9,11H,3-7,16H2,1-2H3,(H,17,22)(H,20,21)/t8-,9+,11-/m1/s1; Key:HGBLNBBNRORJKI-WCABBAIRSA-N

Ciclacillin (INN) or cyclacillin (USAN), trade names Cyclapen, Cyclapen-W, Vastcillin, and others, is an aminopenicillin antibiotic. Its spectrum of activity is similar to that of ampicillin, although it is less susceptible to beta-lactamases than ampicillin and has much higher bioavailability. A large randomized, double-blind clinical trial published in 1978 also showed that ciclacillin is associated with significantly fewer and milder adverse effects than ampicillin; later studies seemed to confirm this improved tolerability, at least in children.

Ciclacillin has been superseded by newer antibiotics and is no longer in clinical use, at least in the United States.

== Synthesis ==
In an attempt to form orally active penicillins unrelated to ampicillin, use was made of the fact that certain spiro α-amino acids, such as Cycloleucine, are well absorbed orally and transported like normal amino acids.

Cyclacillin synthesis:

Reaction of cyclohexanone with ammonium carbonate and KCN under the conditions of the Bucherer-Bergs reaction led to hydantoin 1. On acid hydrolysis, α-amino acid 2 resulted. Treatment with phosgene both protected the amino group and activated the carboxyl group toward amide formation (as 3) and reaction with 6-aminopenicillanic acid (6-APA) gave cyclacillin (4).

This artifice seems to have worked, since cyclacillin is more active in vivo than its in vitro spectrum suggests.
