= Short Line Reading Series =

Literary event

The Short Line Reading Series is a free literary event that takes place at The Railway Club in Vancouver, British Columbia — a venue historical for showcasing local artistic talent.

Hosted by Memewar Magazine, the Short Line is advertised as “a space where artists from different circles can connect, debate and collaborate” — an idea that its organizers keep in mind while constructing diverse line-ups of readers. At each event, members from various Vancouver-based literary groups read short selections of their work (i.e. poetry, prose, essays, performance). Short Line events often include readings by prominent upcoming voices and well-established guest readers.

The Short Line began on January 9, 2007 with a reading by Michael Turner, author of Hard Core Logo and organizer of The Reading Railroad, a regular literary event of the mid-1990s, and inspiration for the founders of the Short Line.

== History ==
The Short Line reading series was founded in November 2006 after conversations between Vancouver writer Carmen Papalia and Vancouver poet and musician Andrew Lee. The two drew their inspiration from author Michael Turner’s Reading Railroad series—a similar event of the mid-1990s which featured readings by various, and often conflicting, literary and musical artists.

Instead of presenting a mixture of starkly contrasting genres and styles as Turner did, the Short Line was designed to “connect” various prominent literary groups in Vancouver. A statement on the Memewar Magazine website reads, “In the spirit of this mixing of genres, the Short Line will include readings by artists from different Vancouver-based literary circles.”

== Origin of name ==
The name “Short Line” refers to the “Short Line Railroad”, one of the four railroads in the popular board game Monopoly. The other railroads found on a standard Monopoly board include: B&O Railroad, Pennsylvania Railroad and Reading Railroad; the last being the name of Michael Turner’s popular reading series of the mid-1990s.

The term “short line railroad” is used to describe an independent railroad company which runs a short distance, and often “connects” different industries. The tagline of the Short Line reading series: “A space where artists from different circles can connect, debate and collaborate” perhaps refers to this quality of “connecting”.

Both “Short Line” and “Reading Railroad” also refer to “The Railway Club”, the Vancouver music venue which is famous for the miniature trains that run along its walls.

== List of readers (by date) ==
- January 9, 2007: Mette Bach, Ryan Flowers, Danielle LaFrance, Andrew Lee, Garry Thomas Morse, Carmen Papalia, Michael Turner, Sean Wilson.
- February 13, 2007: Roger Farr, Emily Fedoruk, Liam Ford, Reg Johanson, Elliott Lummin, Tracy Stefanucci, Irene Zafiris
- March 13, 2007: Phinder Dulai, Patrick Friesen, McKinley M. Hellenes, Dave Morris, Natalie Simpson, Aubyn Rader
- April 10, 2007: Andrea Actis, Clint Burnham, Andrew Lee, Garry Thomas Morse, Thor Polukoshko, Michael V. Smith
- September 17, 2007: Elizabeth Bachinsky, George K. Ilsley, Brendan McLeod, Patrick Morrison, Kevin Murray, Amanda Ryan
- October 22, 2007: Rhoda Hodjati, Matt Hogan, Donato Mancini, Garry T. Morse, Anne Stone, Rita Wong
- November 19, 2007:Jeff Derksen, Stephen Collis, Jason Christie, Nicholas Perrin, Elliott Lummin
- January 29, 2008: Indran Amirthanayagam, Emily Fedoruk, Fiona Tinwei Lam, Loretta Seto, Jane Silcott
- February 26, 2008: Claire Huot, Robert Majzels, Cecily Nicholson, Carmen Papalia
- March 25, 2008: Sonia Capriceru, Jacqueline Turner, Kim Minkus, Louis Rastelli
- April 29, 2008: Garry Thomas Morse, Matt Hogan, Sachiko Murakami, Ivan Drury
- September 16, 2008: Matt Rader, Addena Sumter-Freitag, Sonnet L'Abbé, Russell Thornton
- October 28, 2008: Jordan Scott, Taylor Leedahl, Heather McDonald, Ivan Drury

== List of Musical Guests (alphabetical) ==
Jon Anderson (of Jonathan Inc.), Ken Beady (of Radiogram), Megan Lane, Triple “A”
