= Reading series =

A reading series is a recurring public literary event featuring writers reading from their work to a live audience. Some reading series are curated, some have themes, and some also feature music or other multimedia collaborations. Others simply focus on the act of listening to the written word, read out loud.

== Prominent reading series ==
=== Canada ===
==== British Columbia ====
- On Edge Reading Series. Vancouver.
- The Robson Reading Series. Vancouver.
- Short Line Reading Series, Vancouver

==== New Brunswick ====
- The Lorenzo Reading Series. Saint John.

==== Ontario ====
- Harbourfront Centre Reading Series. Toronto.
- Tree Reading Series. Ottawa.
- The Reading Series at St. Jerome's. Waterloo

=== Great Britain ===
==== England ====
- African Writers' Evening Reading Series. London.

=== Ireland ===
Riverbank Reading Series, Newbridge, Co. Kildare

=== United States ===
==== Arkansas ====
- Argenta Reading Series. North Little Rock.
- Open Mouth Reading Series. Fayetteville.

==== California ====
- Rhapsodomancy. Los Angeles.
- Speakeasy Reading Series. San Francisco.
- Opium Reading Series: Literary Death Match. San Francisco.

==== Illinois ====
- Bookslut Reading Series. Chicago.
- The Danny's Reading Series. Chicago.
- The Encyclopedia Show

==== Massachusetts ====
- Literary Firsts: Aforementioned Productions. Cambridge.
- The Tannery Reading Series: Newburyport.

==== Minnesota ====
- Rain Taxi Reading Series. Minneapolis. Affiliated with the journal Rain Taxi.

==== New York ====
- Happy Ending Music and Reading Series. New York City.
- Guerrilla Lit Reading Series. New York City.
- Pete's Reading Series. New York City.
- P.E.E.L. Series. New York City.
- Opium Reading Series: Literary Death Match. New York City

==== Louisiana ====
- 1718 Reading Series. New Orleans.

==== Oregon ====
- If Not For Kidnap, Portland.
- Literary Arts - Poetry Downtown, Portland.
- Loggernaut Reading Series, Portland.
- Spare Room, Portland.
- Tangent Reading Series, Portland.
- Windfall Reading Series, Eugene.

==== Pennsylvania ====
- UPWords, Pittsburgh. Founding Curator, Damian Dressick.

==== Texas ====
- Zero-to-Sixty Reading Series. Austin, Texas.

==== Washington ====
- It's About Time Reading Series. Seattle.
- Subtext. Seattle.
