= Artifice (disambiguation) =

Artifice was a literary magazine that existed 2009–2017.

Artifice may also refer to:

- The Artifice, visual arts online magazine
- The Artifice (play), 1722 comedy by Susanna Centlivre

== See also ==
- Artificer (disambiguation)
