= Canteen =

Canteen most often refers to:

- Canteen (bottle), a water container
- Cafeteria, a type of food service location within an institution in which there is little or no waiting staff table service
- A complete set of cutlery comprising knives, forks, and spoons, usually sufficient for several place-settings at a meal
- An archaic use was to describe a sutler's shop, where provisions were sold to the military.

Canteen may also refer to:

== Places ==
- Canteen Township, St. Clair County, Illinois, a township in Illinois
- North Platte Canteen, a railroad stop in North Platte, Nebraska, United States that operated from 1941 to 1946

== Other uses ==
- Canteen (magazine), an English-language literary and arts magazine
- CanTeen, the Australian and New Zealand national support organisation for young people with cancer
- Canteen, a railway tender, hauled by a steam locomotive, which holds only water
- Canteen (prison), or prison commissary, a store within a prison where inmates can buy sundries
- "The Canteen", a 1969 episode of On the Buses

== See also ==
- Cantina
