= Memewar =

Canadian magazine

The current Memewar logo (2010- )

The old Memewar logo (2006-2009)

Memewar (pronounced "memoir"), was a free, self-funded magazine from Vancouver, British Columbia.

Categorized as a multidisciplinary magazine (but often labelled as a literary magazine due its literary edge), Memewar features work from many different genres (including poetry, prose, art, photography, essays, comics, etc.) and disciplines (science, literature, history, etc.)

Memewar's mission statement claims that "Memewar is interdisciplinary. Both a "meme war," a clash of ideas, and a "memoir," a recording of history, Memewar offers an inclusive space where diverse communities come together and interact. Each issue is intended to promote dialogue through a variety of genres and perspectives." The title for the magazine comes from Kalle Lasn's Culture Jam, which describes the "meme" war ("meme" being a term to describe any particular facet of culture, such as a cultural tradition, institution or idea) as a battle of subconscious writing of brand names to control the mass media. Essentially, a war of ideas.

Due to their concern for environmental sustainability, Memewar prints only on recycled paper and provides each issue online in PDF form.

== History ==
The editorial collective of Memewar first collaborated on a similar magazine, The Liar, which was funded by Capilano University (in North Vancouver). The issue of The Liar focused on "social tact or lack thereof" and was released in the fall of 2005. During the inception of Memewar, the editors (who, at the time, included Missy Clarkson, AJ Ivings, Christina Gans, Elliott Lummin, Carmen Papalia, Thor Polukoshko, and Aubyn Rader) were influenced by other literary publications such as SubTerrain, Geist, Adbusters, and TISH.

Memewar is responsible for creating the Short Line Reading Series, a Vancouver literary event which began in January 2007.

In 2008, Memewar was named "Best Free Literary Magazine" in The Georgia Straight's "Best of Vancouver" issue.

In 2009, the editors of Memewar formed the Memewar Arts and Publishing Society (MAPS) - an organization devoted to upholding the magazine's focus on creating intellectual and creative dialogue between disciplines and artists. MAPS acts as an umbrella organization which supports projects such as Memewar Magazine and the Short Line Reading Series.

On February 9, 2010, The Memewar Arts & Publishing Society launched their new chapbook press, MemePress, with chapbooks penned by a number of Memewar founding editors. The launch included a poetry chapbook by Aubyn Rader titled "Benedict," along with a collaboration between Carmen Papalia and AJ Ivings titled "Touch Street." The release also included the first complete volume of Thor Polukoshko's comic book, Cereal Junkies, titled "The Trouble with Tigers," which was previously serialized throughout the first ten issues of Memewar.

== Issues ==
- May 9, 2006 - "Blind Spots" (1)
- October 19, 2006 - "Lip Service" (2)
- February 1, 2007 - "Tendencies" (3)
- July 10, 2007 - "Where is My Flying Car?" (4)
- February 21, 2008 - "Heirlooms" (5)
- July 6, 2008 - "Billable Hours" (6)
- October 9, 2008 - "Parental Advisory" (7)
- February 19, 2009 - "Gods and Idols" (8)
- June 20, 2009 - "Mobilize!" (9)
- November 5, 2009 - "Adaptation" (10)
- February 9, 2010 - "Fun & Games" (11)
- December 9, 2010 - "Children" (12)

== See also ==
- List of literary magazines
