= Dick Spotswood =

American lawyer and journalist

Dick Spotswood (born March 25, 1947, San Francisco, CA) is a political writer for the Marin Independent Journal, a newspaper based in Marin County, California, USA.

He is an advocate of a unicameral state legislature, to be accomplished by combining the Assembly and State Senate of California into one house having 120 members.

== Biography ==
Dick Spotswood is the politics and government columnist for the Marin Independent Journal. He is the senior political correspondent for KRCB-Television (PBS, Channel 22 in Rohnert Park) and has been part of KRCB’s award-winning national and state election coverage for the past sixteen years.

A San Francisco native, Dick is a graduate of the University of San Francisco and its School of Law. He is a personal injury attorney with the law firm of Jacobs, Spotswood & Casper.

Spotswood is a former council member (1980–1992) and three-term Mayor of the City of Mill Valley. He served for ten years (1982–1992) as a Director of the Golden Gate Bridge, Highway & Transportation District representing Marin’s eleven cities and towns. In 1992–1993 he served as chair of the Doyle Drive Commission and previously served on the 101 Corridor Committee. In government, his speciality was transportation issues.

Dick Spotswood is the former president of the Rotary Club of Mill Valley, Mountain Play Association, Marin Forum and College of Marin Foundation. In the political spectrum, Spotswood is a registered independent and he has been described as a "militant centrist" which is the name of his blog on marinij.com.

He is a former board member of the California Planning & Conservation League and is currently the secretary of the California Railroad Passengers Association.

== Personal ==
Dick Spotswood married Joanne Peterson Spotswood in November, 1973 in San Francisco, CA. They have two adult children: Beth Spotswood, a San Francisco-based columnist, and Alex Spotswood, an associate product manager at Lucasfilm Animation.
