= Todd Zuniga =

American journalist

Adrian Todd Zuniga
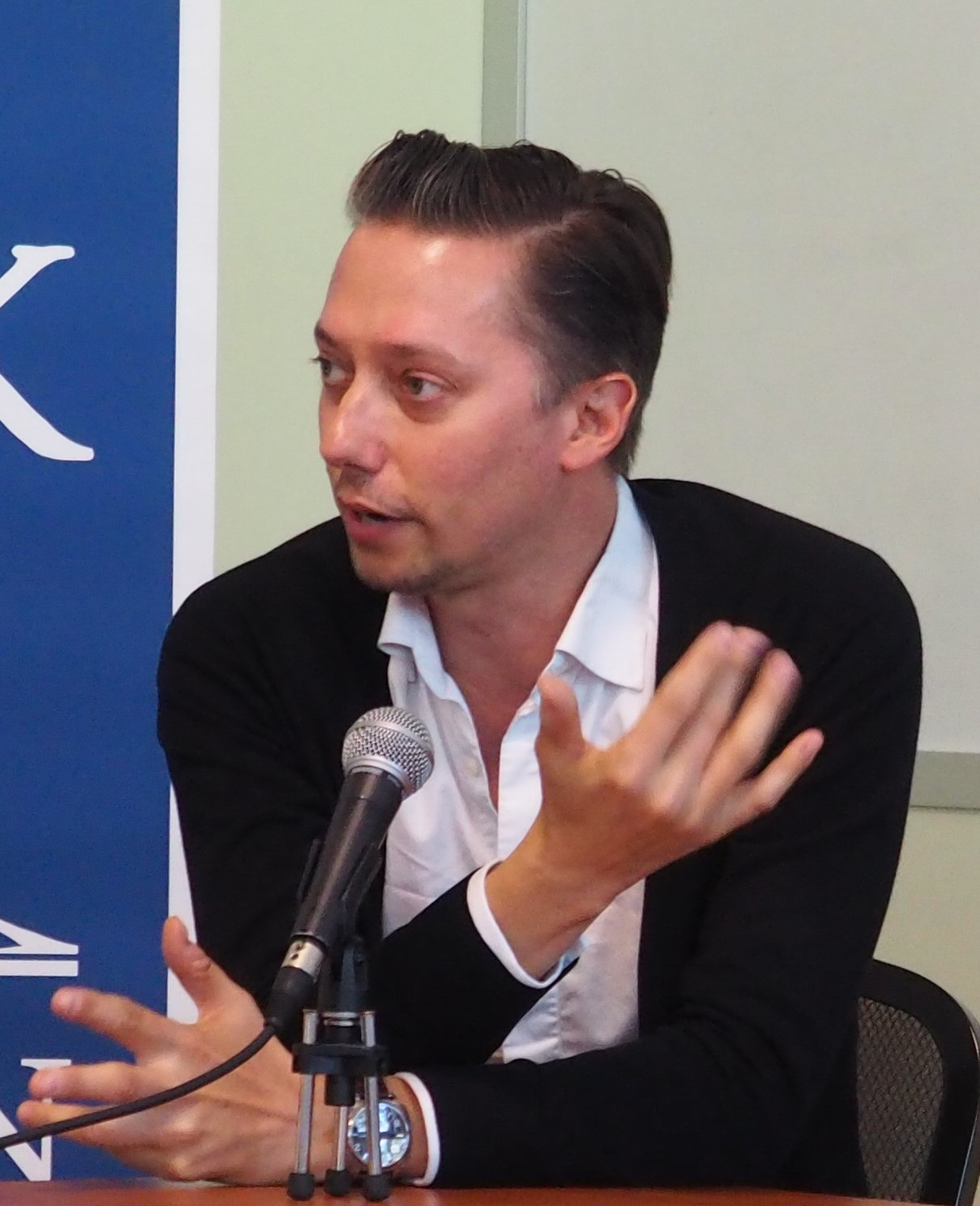
- Writing career
- Genres: Short story, novel
- Website: adriantoddzuniga.com

Adrian Todd Zuniga (born February 4) is a writer, author, and director. He is the founding editor of Opium Magazine, author of the novel Collision Theory, the Writers Guild of America Award-nominated co-writer of Longshot featured in Madden NFL 18, and the co-creator and host of Literary Death Match, a reading series that occurs regularly in over 60 cities worldwide including New York City, San Francisco, London, Los Angeles, and Paris.

== Career ==
Zuniga is the founding editor of Opium Magazine. In 2006, he created Literary Death Match. He also created 1UP.com's Sports Anomaly podcast.

== Recognition ==
He was named a LA Times Face to Watch in 2012.

== Works ==
- Zuniga, A. T. (2014). Flight. Readux Books.
- Zuniga, A. T. (2018). Collision Theory. Rare Bird Books.
