= Apartment (novel) =

2020 novel by Teddy Wayne

- cover
- Author: Teddy Wayne
- Language: English
- Genre: Novel
- Publisher: Bloomsbury Publishing
- Publication date: February 25, 2020
- Publication place: United States
- Media type: Print
- Pages: 208
- ISBN: 9781635574012
- OCLC: 1134074825

Apartment is a 2020 novel by American author Teddy Wayne. Apartment is Wayne's 4th book. The story is set in 1996, and follows the relationship of two young men living in an apartment together while enrolled in Columbia University's M.F.A. writing program. The novel explores themes of masculinity, class, privilege, and loneliness.

The unnamed narrator is a New York University graduate, who is living in his great aunt's two-bedroom rent-stabilized apartment in Manhattan, after she has moved to New Jersey. The narrator meets Billy, a working class young man from a small town in Illinois, who is living in a basement storage room. The narrator offers Billy to live with him in the apartment rent-free, and in exchange Billy will clean the apartment and cook for the two of them. While the narrator's education exceeds his talent, the reverse is true for Billy, a fact which was recognized by both themselves and their classmates. While at first the relationship between the narrator and Billy is warm and symbiotic, midway through the book, an accident quickly divides them, and finally an act of sabotage ends their relationship.

Apartment is a New York Times Editors' Choice, longlisted for the 2020 Simpson/Joyce Carol Oates Literary Prize, and one of Vogue.com's "Best Books of 2020 So Far".

== Plot ==
=== 1996 ===
The novel opens in August 1996 in New York City, where the narrator is enrolled in the Columbia University's prestigious Master of Fine Arts Writing program, and lives in a two-bedroom in Stuyvesant Town on the east side in Manhattan. The apartment is especially desirable because it's rent-stabilized, whereas most rents in Manhattan are exceedingly high. The narrator is however subletting illegally in the apartment, since the lease is under his great aunt's name, who has since moved to New Jersey.

During a writing workshop, the professor and other students criticize the narrator's writing, but one student, Billy Campbell, defends him. The narrator later meets Billy at a bar, and learns he is from a poor family, working as a bartender to make ends meet, and living in a storage room basement. The narrator offers his spare room at the apartment to Billy in exchange for Billy cooking a few nights a week. In addition, Billy agrees to clean the apartment once a week.

With minor disagreements, the narrator and Billy's relationship is warm at first. The narrator greatly admires Billy's writing talent, charisma, handsomeness, and success with women.

In December, the narrator and Billy take ecstasy with 2 women. The narrator accidentally touches Billy in a sexual manner, and Billy abruptly leaves. After this experience, Billy becomes cold and distant toward the narrator.

=== 1997 ===
During the next semester, another professor praises Billy's work while criticizing the narrator's. That night at the apartment, Billy hints that the narrator's writing is more "accountant-like" than "artist".

The MFA students receive a letter that a $7000 stipend is available for a rising second-year student, and applications need to submit a writing sample to apply. The narrator learns Billy plans to apply, and will presumably be able to move out of their shared apartment if he wins.

Billy begins to spend more time with other friends, and less with the narrator. The resentment between the two becomes more apparent. After feeling economically used by Billy, the narrator asks Billy to clean the bathroom. At a Super Bowl party, Billy mocks the narrator for never having a "real job" in front of several people. That night the narrator returns to the apartment, and dumps Billy's file cabinet and computer into the East River to prevent Billy from winning the stipend. To cover his tracks, the narrator tries to make the situation look like a burglary.

Billy returns to apartment shocked to find his computer and file cabinet missing, and convinces the reluctant narrator to file a claim through his great aunt's renter's insurance. The insurance company requires the police to be contacted in order to process the claim. The two agree that Billy will talk to the police alone.

After the semester concludes, the narrator receives a letter from his landlord ordering him to vacate the apartment since he is in violation of the lease for illegal subletting. Billy states that he admitted to the police he was living there illegally after being accused of falsely reporting an insurance claim. Billy tells the narrator he knows he staged the burglary to sabotage him, and that he plans to move out to live with two other classmates.

While the narrator is not charged criminally, the insurance company finds out and penalizes him thousands of dollars. As a result, the narrator's father stops paying his tuition. The narrator decides to drop out of school, move into another apartment with 3 other roommates, and work as a freelance copy editor.

=== After ===
The narrator is eventually hired on full-time. Believing he will never be an author, he declines to reenroll at Columbia. He is later promoted to copy chief of the magazine, but lives a life of solitude.

Billy becomes a midlist author and a professor at an Idaho university. He lives with his wife and children.

== Characters ==
=== Major ===
- Narrator: An unnamed young, upper-middle-class man, graduate of New York University who is pursuing an MFA degree at Columbia University. His novel, The Copy Chief, is about a copy editor who spends his days doing monotonous work, but secretly possesses a great talent for writing. While he is well-educated and financially comfortable, he lacks writing talent and is socially awkward.
- Billy Campbell: Like the narrator, Billy is also a young man pursuing an MFA degree at Columbia. Unlike the narrator, Billy doesn't have a 4-year degree and is struggling financially. Born into a working-class family in a small, impoverished town in Illinois, Billy's father left when he was very young. To make ends meet, Billy frequently works at a bar called The Eagle's Nest. His novel, No Man's Land is about an underemployed man living in the Rust Belt. Also unlike the narrator, Billy's writing receives considerable praise from his classmates and professors. Politically, Billy is more conservative than the narrator. Lastly, Billy is charismatic, whereas the narrator is socially awkward.

=== Minor ===
- Narrator's great aunt: the lease holder of the rent-stabilized apartment where the narrator stays. She has moved to New Jersey, but she has agreed to let the narrator illegally occupy the apartment. In 12 months, she will legally transfer the lease to him and the narrator can legally reside there.
- Sylvia Hellman: a professor at Columbia University. She is leader of the fiction workshop class of which Billy and the Narrator are enrolled in the first semester. She is well-respected by the students and advises them "[not to] play it safe and hold back [but rather] experiment [and] open yourself up to brutally honest feedback". She criticizes the narrator's writing as "facile and predictable".
- David Lankford: a college friend of the narrator who now works for a publishing house. He gets the narrator and Billy onto the guest list of a literary magazine party. Later, the narrator sends Billy's novel to him, who impressed, forwards it to a book agent.
- Robert Stockton: a professor at Columbia university. A Vietnam veteran and former high school football player, he has had modest success as a writer. Both the narrator and Billy are enrolled in his class in the second semester. Like Sylvia and other students, he criticizes the narrator's writing and praises Billy's.
- Jim: An older man the narrator and Billy meet in the bar. He had only 1 mildly successful play run off-Broadway in 1965. Having long ago abandoned playwriting, he got a job in life insurance, married, had children, and divorced. He now describes himself as a "nowhere man".
- Claire and Naomi: Both visiting New York from London, the narrator and Billy meets them in a bar. Claire is aspiring author. While at first Billy is unconfident in himself, they later go dancing, go back to the apartment, and Billy ends up sleeping with Naomi. The narrator on the other hand has an awkward experience with Claire.
- Matt: a classmate of the narrator and Billy. A leader in the graduate student union. As the novel progresses, Billy becomes closer friends with Matt and Adam and more distant from the narrator.
- Adam: a classmate of the narrator and Billy. He publishes his novel The Hiker in the prestigious Atlantic Monthly. This contrasts with the narrator whose novel is published in a no-name periodically that the university doesn't even carry.
- Oliver: A former classmate of the narrator when he was enrolled at NYU. Oliver and the narrator had several friends in common, but the narrator has lost touch with all of them.
- Jessica and Marie: Jessica, a bridesmaid of Billy's cousin, and Marie, her friend, take ecstasy with the narrator and Billy. After turning down the lights and caressing each other, the narrator inadvertently touches Billy instead of Marie, after which Billy abruptly leaves.
- Narrator's father: A chemical engineer, he hesitantly finances the narrator's education. He lives with his other family and is emotionally distant from the narrator.
- Narrator's mother: Described by Billy as "nice" and the narrator as "meddling", she and the narrator's father divorce during the narrator's childhood. Other than financial support, she takes on all parental duties.
- Steve: the copy chief of the men's magazine where the narrator freelances. Eventually the narrator is hired on full-time. Years later, Steve leaves for another magazine, and the narrator assumes his job.
- Police Officer (Unnamed): After the narrator gets a fraudulent insurance claim filed, the unnamed police officer investigates the "break in" and questions Billy while the narrator is not present. After accusing Billy of insurance fraud, Billy confesses that he is subletting illegally and convinces the officer not to file charges. However, the officer does inform insurance company of the fraud and the land lord of the illegal subletting.

== Themes ==
=== Class and privilege ===
The narrator notes that the university's "extortionate tuition and dearth of fellowship stipends saw to [half the class had obvious socioeconomic advantages]". In an interview the author states, "it's a lot easier to spend eight years writing a first novel or take an unpaid internship when you know that you have an upper-middle-class parachute you can open in an emergency. The irony in Apartment is that the narrator is not only ashamed of his upper-middle-class provenance, but thinks it's an artistic detriment, since he has nothing worth writing about, whereas he fetishizes Billy's Midwestern working-class authenticity."

After mocking the narrator for never having to hold a manual labor job, the narrator observes: "How easily he could mock me for my privileges, but I doubted he had ever considered the copious ones he enjoyed, which society didn't catalog as overly...and he was never made to feel guilty for these natural advantages and resources he'd done nothing to earn"

=== Fear of failure ===
"If masculinity is one theme, the other is fear of failure", wrote J. Oliver Conroy in a review. "Apartment is about young writers grappling with the possibility that they'll never make it at all. [But while] Wonder Boys is funny and life-affirming — Apartment is dark and deeply sad"

=== Loneliness ===
Both the narrator and Billy are only children, and both are raised without fathers present. The narrator notes that after his parents' divorce, "I had never longed for a sibling as much as that moment...I just wanted another person to shoulder the pain with me, to go through exactly what I'd have to go through".

In Billy's novel, No Man's Land, the narrator is divorced, and both his father and son are deceased, a fact that most of the writing workshop class misses during discussion.

After a chance meeting with Oliver in the East Village, the narrator realizes that his former friends grown distant from him. One of the narrator's former friends, Peter, is getting married, and the narrator is not only uninvited to the wedding, but didn't even know Peter had a girlfriend.

After the narrator confesses his crime to Billy, and Billy asks him why he did it, the narrator responds, "I didn't want you to leave me". The narrator regrets that Billy is likely the last person he would ever be close to.

Years later in 2016, the narrator notes that his own life has become more and more solitary, but solitude "isn't so bad once you come to expect it".

In a bar the narrator and Billy meet Jim, a much older, divorced former playwright whose given up on his dreams, and describes himself as a "nobody man": "I'm out of my time's joint...doesn't have a point of view. No one cares what I have to say anymore". Billy assures Jim, "You're not a nowhere man. You're still here". Twenty years later in 2016, the narrator's final words in the novel are "Still here".

=== Male bonding ===
Some reviewers have opined that the principal characters aren't friends. Anthony Domestico writes, "The narrator thinks he's a benevolent friend to Billy; he's just as much a vampiric consumer, drinking in his writerly gifts and blue-collar bona fides." Stefan Beck writes, "Contra most of the critical response to Apartment, the book absolutely is not 'about male friendship.' It is about a parasitic symbiosis: one party using the other to meet emotional needs, one to meet material needs; one party idealizing the other, one privately loathing the other. To mistake this for friendship is to tell on oneself."

=== Political ===
During an interview, the author states “[the 1990s were] the last time I could plausibly bring together a coastal liberal — in the form of the narrator — and a Heartland economic conservative like Billy and have them be friends...it was the last time that the polarization of the country was not so vast as to permit a connection between these two guys". Billy's political differences with the narrator are highlighted during the novel. During the election night of the 1996 US presidential election, Billy surprises the narrator by saying he voted for Bob Dole. Later, he dismisses the idea of sex reassignment surgery and is "visibly perturbed by the gay scene on Christopher Street."

== Development ==
The idea for the novel came in February 2017 when the author suddenly realized he never wrote about Stuyvesant Town, a place he lived off and on for 14 years.

The author decided choose the 1990s as the setting because he wanted to examine the friendship between 2 men, and wanted to choose a time before the Internet changed social interaction and reduced "the intensity of bonds". In addition, "that was probably the last time that someone from a flyover state (part of conservative America) could plausibly be in an MFA program at Columbia, the last time two guys from the two Americas might be friends in this context. And it was a time when masculinity was very much in flux.".
