= Opium Magazine =

American literary magazine

Opium magazine logo.

Opium is a journal featuring fiction, comics, poetry and humor. Founded by Todd Zuniga, the magazine first appeared online in 2001 and in print in 2005. It was based in San Francisco and later, it is headquartered in New York City. It features many notable writers and artists including Etgar Keret, Aimee Bender, Tao Lin, David Gaffney, Davis Schneiderman, Alison Weaver, Jamie Iredell, D.B. Weiss, Diane Williams, Jessy Randall, Tana Wojczuk, Pia Z. Ehrhardt, Ben Greenman, Jack Handey, Dawn Raffel, Stuart Dybek, Josip Novakovich, Dan Golden, Terese Svoboda, Benjamin Percy, Shya Scanlon, Greg Sanders, Christopher Kennedy and Art Spiegelman. Exclusive on-line material has included work by Martha Clarkson, Stacy Muszynski, Brigit Kelly Young and Iris Gribble-Neal.

Opium hosts the Literary Death Match, a competitive, humor-centric reading series that features four writers in a read-off, all critiqued by three judges. Opium Europe features all-new content written solely by Europeans, in both French and English, both online and off. Opium Studio, scheduled to open in Spring 2009, is a virtual art gallery that showcases everything from wit-inspired cartoons to paintings to collage to sculpture. Opium Live is an interview series that features interviews with authors and artists.

In June 2009, Opium launched Opium 8, "The Infinity Issue," featuring conceptual artist Jonathan Keats and "The Longest Story Ever Told." To create this nine-word story, Keats used a double layer of black ink and masked the words with an incrementally screened overlay. It can be read at a pace of one word per century, or as ultraviolet light fades the overlay. According to the artist, the reading of this story is predicted to take one thousand years. Keats' work is covered worldwide including in America, Brazil, Russia, the UK, Turkey, Japan, and France.

In Fall of 2009, Opium released their ninth issue, dubbed "The Mania Issue". It features stories and poetry by writers including Jonathan Baumbach, Dawn Raffel, Dean Young, Kathleen Rooney, and Elisa Gabbert, as well as a "Fan Fiction Explosion" curated by previous Opium contributor Shya Scanlon.

== See also ==
- List of literary magazines
