= Loggernaut =

Loggernaut Reading Series is a reading series in Portland, Oregon founded in 2005. Each reading features three readers and a prompt to which they respond. It is currently curated by Jesse Lichtenstein, Erin Ergenbright, and Pauls Toutonghi.

Past readers include Charles D'Ambrosio, Laila Lalami, Peter Rock, Justin Tussing, Tom Spanbauer, Tom Bissell, Carrie Brownstein, Paul Collins, Daniel Mason, Joshua Beckman, Joyelle McSweeney, and Jonathan Raymond.

The series also publishes an online literary magazine with the same name. Its in-depth interviews with authors in various genres have included Paula Fox, Sam Lipsyte, Alice Notley, Jonathan Raban, David Means, Karen Tei Yamashita, James Longenbach, David Shields, Kimiko Hahn, and Pankaj Mishra.

== See also ==
- List of literary magazines
