= Damian Dressick =

American writer (born 1968)

- Born: 1968 (age 57–58)
- Education: University of Pittsburgh (MFA); University of Southern Mississippi (PhD)
- Writing career
- Genres: novelist, short story writer

Damian Dressick (born 1968) is an American author from Pittsburgh, Pennsylvania.

== Career ==
Dressick is the author of the novel 40 Patchtown (Bottom Dog Press, 2020), and the story collection Fables of the Deconstruction (forthcoming in 2020 from CLASH Books). His story “Four Hard Facts about Water” appeared in New Micro: Exceptionally Short Fiction, an anthology published by W. W. Norton in 2019.

Dressick’s fiction work has also appeared in many literary journals, including the New Delta Review, McSweeneys, Alimentum, failbetter, Post Road, HeartWood Literary Journal, New Orleans Review, CutBank, Hot Metal Bridge, Weave, New World Writing, SmokeLong Quarterly, Barcelona Review, and Hobart. He has published essays in Hippocampus Magazine and Connotation Press.

Dressick currently teaches writing at Clarion University, where he helps curate Clarion's Visiting Writers Series. He has also taught writing at the University of Pittsburgh, Robert Morris University, and Pennsylvania State University. He designed and taught “Writing the 1000 Word (or less) Story” at the Pittsburgh Center for the Arts. He was a residency fellow at the Blue Mountain Center and the Orchard Keeper Writers Residency Program. He serves as fiction editor for the Northern Appalachia Review , and was a founding curator of Pittsburgh’s UPWords Reading Series.

== Education ==
Dressick earned an MFA in fiction writing from the University of Pittsburgh, and holds a PhD in English from the Center for Writers at the University of Southern Mississippi, with concentrations in Creative Writing, Contemporary Literature and Postcolonial Literature.

== Awards ==
In 2008 and 2009 Dressick was nominated for the Pushcart Prize for short fiction. He is the winner of the Spire Press 2009 Prose Chapbook Contest for his collection Fables of the Deconstruction. In 2007 he won the Harriette Arnow Award for short fiction. In 2018 he won the Jesse Stuart Prize and was a Finalist for the Katherine Anne Porter Prize in Fiction.
