= Artificer =

Artificer may refer to:

- Armed-forces artificer, a service member skilled in working on artillery devices in the field
- Artificer (Dungeons & Dragons), a character class in the Dungeons & Dragons fantasy role-playing game

== See also ==
- Artifice (disambiguation)
