= Loner (novel) =

2016 American novel by Teddy Wayne

- First edition
- Author: Teddy Wayne
- Language: English
- Genre: Fiction
- Publisher: Simon & Schuster
- Publication date: 2016
- Publication place: United States
- Pages: 203

Loner is a 2016 American novel by Teddy Wayne that explores the themes of toxic masculinity, sexual assault, ambition, socioeconomic stratification, and social media saturation in a campus novel setting.

== Plot ==
A lonely, awkward, newly arrived Harvard University student from New Jersey, David Federman—described by one of his high school teacher's as "something of a loner"—becomes fixated on another first-year student, a Manhattan girl named Veronica Morgan Wells. David quickly and unhappily begins to make unpopular friends very similar to those he had in high school. One of them is Ohio native Sara Cohen. Once he realizes that Sara is Veronica's dorm-mate, David dates her in order to get closer to Veronica. In the process, he also stalks Veronica across campus, following her to courses such as "Gender and the Consumerist Impulse" and "From Ahab to Prufrock: Tragically Flawed Hero(in)es in American Literature." While his relationship with Sara becomes more serious, David remains obsessed with Veronica, who he learns (from her Facebook photos) is dating an attractive, wealthy senior, Liam, from one of the school's final clubs. When the first paper is due for "From Ahab to Prufrock," he helps her write a paper on the theme of scopophilia in Henry James' Daisy Miller.

Meanwhile, David and Sara's relationship continues to develop until they engage in multiple acts of sex, the first for both of them; Sara is reluctant, but David presses her to acquiesce. After he breaks up with her (thinking that the longer he stays in the relationship, the less likely Veronica will be interested in him), he learns from his roommate that she considers the acts rape. He is confused, maintaining that she didn't say no.

Ultimately, David is hardly bothered by her accusation, feeling that now that he is no longer a virgin, he is ready for Veronica. He continues to write papers and stalk her, and discovers that she is having an illicit affair with the graduate student who oversees their class. He attempts to blackmail her with this information, resulting in an encounter in which he becomes aggressive and she fends him off while providing him with some sexual gratification.

Over Thanksgiving break, David stalks Veronica outside her Manhattan home and into a bar. Annoyed and frightened, she attempts to completely cut him off. Back at school, David spirals into isolation. He tries to track her down when she hands in her final paper for "Gender and the Consumerist Impulse," but arrives after she has handed it in. To his horror and astonishment, he learns that Veronica had been using him the entire time as a case study for toxic male behavior, referring to him as "Beta" in comparison to her "Alpha" boyfriend. Fueled by rage, he breaks into her dorm, hides in her closet, and waits until she is unconscious and intoxicated in her bed. He then attempts to rape her, but she wakes up and alerts Sara, who rescues her. The two of them escape and call the police. David is arrested, but the charges are dropped because he has enough exonerating evidence and Veronica's parents don't want the family to live with the scandal; David is simply not allowed to come into any contact with Veronica for five years.

David is expelled from Harvard. Unable to transfer to a school to his liking, he attends community college while living at home. He summarizes his current life as one in which he spends most of his time in his room on the Internet. It is now five years after the events of the novel, which means he is legally allowed to contact Veronica, and we learn that he has been writing this book to tell his side of the story. In his room, he looks at Sara's Facebook page. Her profile picture is of her and her new boyfriend with their backs to the camera, and it prompts David to imagine how she looks now, and to imagine how life would have been had they stayed together.

In a final flashback, David remembers being led out of his dorm by the police on the night of his attempted rape—a moment he thought would be full of glory, but which only confirmed his anonymity.

== Reception ==
Author Meg Wolitzer praised Loner as "a tightly written, tensely memorable short novel". The New York Post named it among their "40 best books of 2016 you must read immediately", calling its ending "impossible to predict" and "inexorable." Kirkus Reviews considered the novel to be a "startlingly sharp study" of "collegiate culture and social forces at large". Elizabeth Rowe of Bookish rated it among the best books of 2016, for "its ability to make the reader simultaneously feel real discomfort and a reluctance to put it down." Reviewing the book for The New York Times, author Lucinda Rosenfeld commented on its "not entirely plausible" conclusion but questioned the setting of the narrative "inside the mind" of David, "the novel's deceitful and deranged antihero," in addition to the "somewhat mystifying" attraction to David by the female protagonist Sara, given her "strong political consciousness".
