= The Encyclopedia Show =

The Encyclopedia Show is a live variety show and reading series format founded in Chicago by Robbie Q. Telfer and Shanny Jean Maney in December 2008 at the Chopin Theatre. Since its founding, it has spread to regular shows in Austin, Oklahoma City, Providence, Columbus, Ohio, Oakland, Indianapolis, Somerville, Massachusetts, District of Columbia, Vancouver Canada and Seoul, South Korea.

The show follows a research conceit that presents a different topic every month. Within each topic, artists are assigned subtopics that they have to present new creative material on. The show also juxtaposes real experts in the field regarding the various topics. Past participants have been Bill Ayers, Paul Sereno, Marc Smith, Helen Morrison, Roger Bonair-Agard, and Robert Boone.

In March 2010, the Chicago Encyclopedia Show won the Orgie (short for Original) Theatre Award for 2009's "Best Creation/Curators."
