= Jonathon Keats =

American conceptual artist

- Jonathon Keats, San Francisco, 2026
- Born: October 2, 1971 (age 55); New York City, U.S.
- Education: Amherst College
- Known for: Conceptual art, installation art, performance art
- Notable work: The God Project, The First Intergalactic Art Exposition, The Photosynthetic Restaurant

Jonathon Keats (born October 2, 1971) is an American conceptual artist and experimental philosopher known for creating large-scale thought experiments. Keats was born in New York City and studied philosophy at Amherst College. He now lives in San Francisco and Italy.

== Art projects ==
=== Early work ===
Keats made his debut in 2000 at Refusalon in San Francisco, where he sat in a chair and thought for 24 hours, with a female model posing nude in the gallery. His thoughts were sold to patrons as art, at a price determined by dividing their annual income down to the minute.

In 2002 Keats held a petition drive to pass the Law of Identity, A ≡ A, a law of logic, as statutory law in Berkeley, California. Specifically, the proposed law stated that, "every entity shall be identical to itself." Any entity caught being unidentical to itself was to be subject to a fine of up to one tenth of a cent. Deemed "too weird for Berkeley" in an Oakland Tribune headline, the law did not pass. However it did become a topic of debate in the 2002 Massachusetts gubernatorial race, garnering cryptic words of support from the Mitt Romney campaign and sparked a copycat petition drive in Santa Cruz, California. In the same year, amidst tightening post-9/11 security, Keats initiated a series of anonymous self-portraits of visitors to the San Francisco Arts Commission Gallery, created by fingerprinting them as they entered the building. And at Modernism Gallery in San Francisco, he premiered his first musical composition, "1001 Concertos for Tuning Forks and Audience".

Keats copyrighted his mind in 2003, claiming that it was a sculpture that he had created, neural network by neural network, through the act of thinking. The reason, he told the BBC World Service when interviewed about the project, was to attain temporary immortality, on the grounds that the Copyright Act would give him intellectual property rights on his mind for a period of seventy years after his death. He reasoned that, if he licensed out those rights, he would fulfill the Cogito ergo sum ("I think, therefore I am"), paradoxically surviving himself by seven decades. In order to fund the posthumous marketing of intellectual property rights to his mind, he sold futures contracts on his brain in an IPO at Modernism Gallery in San Francisco. The project attracted interest in Silicon Valley. It was later included in News of the Weird and Ripley's Believe It or Not. In 2012, the project was exhibited in London at the Wellcome Collection.

=== Projects 2004–2010 ===
Keats is most famous for attempting to genetically engineer God in a laboratory. He did so in order to determine scientifically where to place God as a species on the phylogenetic tree. In interviews with journalists, he indicated that his initial results showed a close taxonomic relationship to cyanobacteria, but cautioned that his pilot study, which relied on continuous in vitro evolution, was not definitive, urging interested parties to pursue their own research, and to submit findings to the International Association for Divine Taxonomy, on which he served as executive director.

In 2005 he started customizing the metric system for patrons including Craigslist founder Craig Newmark and Pop artist Ed Ruscha. He did so by recalibrating time to each person's heartbeat, and mathematically deriving a new length for the meter, liter, kilogram, and calorie accordingly.

Around the same time, he became interested in extraterrestrial abstract art, and began producing canvas paintings based on signals detected by the Arecibo Observatory radiotelescope in Puerto Rico. This was the basis of the First Intergalactic Art Exposition, a 2006 solo show at the Judah L. Magnes Museum in Berkeley, California. As part of this exhibition, he also transmitted his own abstract artwork out into the cosmos.

In 2006 Keats undertook several new projects, including two collaborations with other species: In rural Georgia, he gave fifty Leyland cypress trees the opportunity to make art by providing them with easels. In Chico, California, he choreographed a ballet for honeybees by selectively planting flowers on the Chico State University farm, reverse engineering honeybee communication to suggest dance arrangements inside hives. Keats also turned to himself as the subject of a lifelong thought experiment, undertaken through the act of living. To make the experiment scientifically rigorous, he established a scientific control in the form of a high-density carbon graphite block precisely calibrated to match the carbon weight of his own body. The block was placed on display under a bell jar at the Exploratorium in San Francisco. And at Modernism Gallery in San Francisco, he applied string theory to real estate development, enlisting the legal framework of air rights to buy and sell properties in the extra dimensions of space theorized by physics. To encourage speculation, the artist created blueprints for a four-dimensional tesseract house that purchasers might use as a vacation home. One hundred and seventy-two lots on six Bay Area properties were bought on the first day of sales.

In 2007, Keats created a mobile ring tone based on the John Cage composition 4'33", a remix comprising precisely four minutes and 33 seconds of digital silence, sparking controversy in the classical music community, and the world of technology, while attracting a following in the world of astrology. Titled "My Cage (Silence for Cellphone)", the ringtone has since been broadcast on public radio in both the United States and Sweden, discussed in a monograph about Cage published by Yale University Press, and included in a museum exhibition on Cage at HMKV in Dortmund, Germany. In Chico, California, Keats opened the world's first porn theater for house plants, projecting video footage of pollination onto the foliage of ninety rhododendrons. He released a cinematic trailer on YouTube. His film was widely commented upon in the media following coverage by Reuters and the BBC News Hour. At the RT Hansen Gallery in Berlin, Germany, he sold arts patrons the experience of spending money. For an exhibition at the Berkeley Art Museum, he designed a new kind of electronic voting booth, based on a nationwide network of ouija boards. While ouija voting booths have yet to be implemented in a major election, California Magazine cited the project in a 2007 round-up of "25 Brilliant California Ideas". At Modernism Gallery in San Francisco the following month, Keats developed new miracles, including novel solar systems and supernova pyrotechnic displays, which he made available for licensing by gods. In addition, he composed a sonata to be performed on the constellations, released through GarageBand.

Keats brought his honeybee ballet to San Francisco in 2008 as part of Bay Area Now, the Yerba Buena Center for the Arts triennial. He also erected the first temple devoted to the worship of science, dubbed "the Atheon", in downtown Berkeley, CA, a public art project commissioned by the Judah L. Magnes Museum and funded with a grant from the University of California. The Atheon opened on September 27, 2008. After a Wired Science interview with the artist was featured on the Yahoo homepage on September 29, controversy erupted in both the scientific and religious communities, and interest in the Atheon gained traction worldwide. A Synod was held inside the Atheon on December 4, with participants including UC Berkeley philosopher John Campbell and UC Berkeley astrophysicist Ilan Roth.

In the midst of the Atheon debate, Keats announced that he had discovered a way to play God, using quantum mechanics to generate new universes. Enlisting the many worlds interpretation of physicist Hugh Everett, his process made use of readily-available equipment including uranium-doped glass and scintillating crystal, all acquired on eBay. After building several prototypes, Keats manufactured a simple D.I.Y. kit that purported to let anyone create new universes with a mason jar, a drinking straw, and a piece of chewing gum, a gadget much commented upon in the media and widely popular in the blogosphere. In an exhibition at Modernism Gallery in San Francisco, Keats sold the kits for $20 apiece, and also presented plans, simultaneously submitted to the United States Department of Energy, for a much larger factory, which would generate new universes from the nuclear waste slated to be buried in the Yucca Mountain nuclear waste repository in the next decade. His proposal has proven controversial.

In early 2009, Keats was an artist-in-residence at Montana State University in Bozeman, where he opened the world's second porn theater for house plants, based on the porn theater he opened in Chico, CA in 2007, but in this case catering to an audience of local zinnias. He also composed a song to be performed by Mandeville Creek on the MSU campus, orchestrated by rearranging rocks melodically, using the musical structure of the medieval rondeau. In June, Keats created "The Longest Story Ever Told," a nine-word story printed on the cover of the eighth issue of Opium Magazine, "The Infinity Issue." The story is printed in a double layer of black ink, with the second layer screened to make each successive word fractionally less vulnerable to ultraviolet radiation. When exposed to sunlight, words will appear at a rate of one per century over the next one thousand years, an effort deemed one of the seven best magazine tech innovations by Tech Radar and called Joycean by NBC, but judged to be "about as practical as a shark in formaldehyde" by The Independent. Keats attempted to counteract the global recession in November by introducing a mirror economy backed by antimatter. In order to implement his idea, Keats opened an "anti-bank" which issued paper currency in units of 10,000 positrons and higher. Featured on Good Magazine's annual Good 100 list, Keats's First Bank of Antimatter was championed by New Scientist as "a true attempt to make something out of nothing" and lambasted by The Discovery Channel as "the epitome of caveat emptor".

=== Projects 2010–present ===
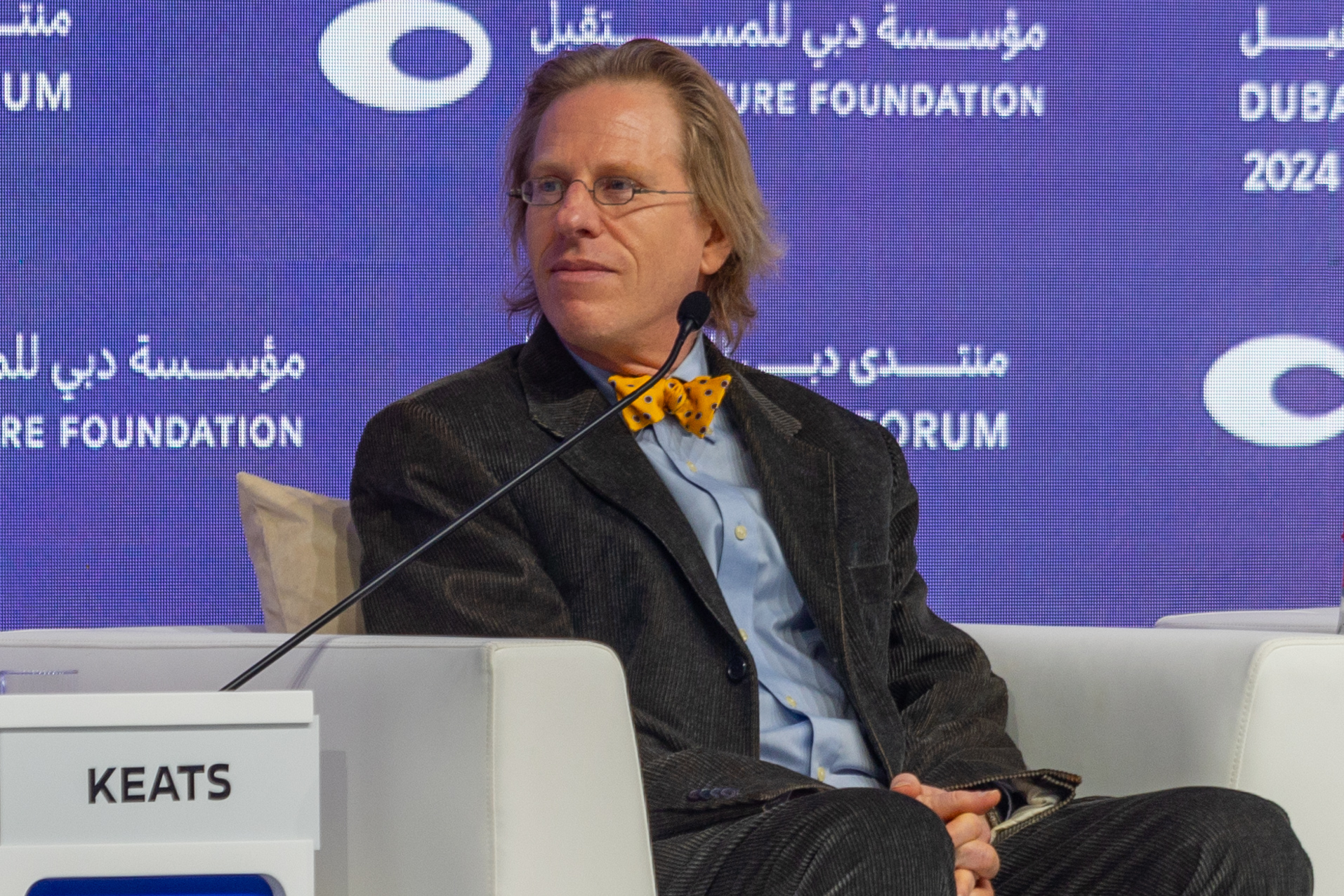
Keats at the Dubai Future Forum (2024)

Keats introduced four new projects in 2010. In January he created a pinhole camera intended to take a single 100-year-long exposure. Printed in Good Magazine, the simple box camera was designed to be cut out, folded, and glued together, and then left to take a picture which the magazine promised to publish in a "special folio" as part of the January 2110 issue. In February, Keats expanded his filmmaking for plants into a new genre. Observing that plants aren't mobile, he produced a travel documentary – showing footage of Italian skies – which he screened for an audience of ficus and palm trees at the AC Institute in New York City through early March, and later in the year presented to an audience of mixed species, with musical accompaniment by the composer Theresa Wong, at the Berkeley Art Museum in California. He also produced an online version of the movie for viewing by plants at home, posted by Wired News Following an AFP wire story, news of the travel documentaries was reported worldwide, though not in Italy. Keats launched an alternative space agency, the Local Air and Space Administration (LASA), in October. Headquartered at California State University, Chico, the organization claimed to be taking on the exploratory role abandoned by NASA, and announced simultaneous missions to the Moon and Mars. Rather than building rockets, LASA amassed lunar and martian terrain locally in California, by pulverizing meteorites. The first LASA astronauts were potatoes grown in water mineralized with lunar anorthosite and martian shergottite, exploring the Moon and Mars by osmosis, according to Keats, who further argued that the minerals they absorbed over their month-long missions made them "alien hybrids". LASA also entered the space tourism business, offering humans the opportunity to explore the Moon and Mars by buying and drinking bottled lunar and martian mineral waters at an "exotourism bureau" in San Francisco. At the same time that he was managing the Local Air & Space Administration, Keats started independently to produce pornography for God. The source for his pornography was the Large Hadron Collider (LHC) which had just begun to replicate Big Bang conditions at a small scale. Reasoning that the Big Bang was "divine coitus", Keats screened a live feed from the LHC on a votive altar. He opened his "porn palace for God" at the alternative art space Louis V. ESP in Brooklyn, New York. While Keats explained that he had become "God's pornographer" in order to encourage God to create additional universes since our own was doomed by cosmic expansion, worldwide opinion on the worthiness of his project was mixed.

Keats turned his attention to flora again in early 2011, opening a "photosynthetic restaurant" where plants could enjoy "gourmet sunlight". Recipes were prepared by filtering solar radiation through colored plexiglass. The restaurant was installed in the outdoor gardens of the Crocker Art Museum in Sacramento, California, where 100-year-old rose bushes were the first patrons. Keats catered to plants elsewhere in the world by publishing a recipe book and also producing TV dinners for plants, which could experience gourmet sunlight vicariously through the changing colors on a television screen or computer monitor. Plants can access the TV dinners via Wired. In May 2011, Keats presented New Yorkers with an alternative to marriage that dispensed with governmental formalities, promising instead to bind people together by a law of nature. He adapted the methodology of quantum entanglement, which is used in physics laboratories to make two or more subatomic particles behave as if they were one and the same. Using equipment bought on eBay, Keats built an "entanglement engine" that ostensibly could entangle people who visited the AC Institute in New York City. Demonstrating the mechanism on NPR's Science Friday, he cautioned that "those who get entangled will have to take their entanglement on faith, as any attempt to measure a quantum system disentangles it: A quantum marriage will literally be broken up by skepticism about it." In October 2011, Keats fomented a "Copernican Revolution in the arts." In a manifesto published by Zyzzyva, he declared that "while the Copernican Revolution has enlightened scientists for centuries, art remains Ptolemaic," favoring masterpieces rather than average phenomena. To attain Copernican "mediocrity" in the arts, he produced paintings that were the average color of the universe, a light shade of beige, which he exhibited at Modernism Gallery in San Francisco, California. He also showed sculptures that were made of hydrogen gas, the most common elemental matter in the universe, and presented a "Retempered Clavier" that randomized J.S. Bach's Well-Tempered Clavier to bring it into accord with the increased entropy of the universe. Gallery visitors could purchase cans of "universal anti-seasoning," which was formulated to make cuisine more bland.

Keats opened a "Microbial Academy of Sciences" in January 2012. Situated in the San Francisco Arts Commission gallery, his academy provided colonies of cyanobacteria with access to imagery from the Hubble Space Telescope, which he said would allow the photosynthetic microbes to do astrophysical research. In an interview with the Wall Street Journal, Keats explained that he was motivated by the unresolved scientific quest for a theory of everything, the failings of which he attributed to the complexity of the human brain relative to the simplicity of the universe. He claimed that the fundamental laws of physics could more readily be grasped by cyanobacteria than by humans, because "cyanobacteria are not burdened by all that gray matter.”

In April 2012, Keats launched the Electrochemical Currency Exchange Co. in the basement of Rockefeller Center. According to The Economist, his enterprise exploited "electrochemical arbitrage", generating energy by taking advantage of differences in the metallic content of Chinese and American coinages. The energy generated was used to power a data processing center, but, due to the low wattage, the center consisted of pocket calculators, limiting computations to addition, subtraction, multiplication and division. On May 16, 2012, a similar experiment was held in Hong Kong in the lobby of an HSBC building. But this time the electrochemical charge was derived exclusively from Chinese currency: aluminum Chinese fen and brass Hong Kong pennies. A special website was made for this particular event.

In 2015, Keats developed century cameras and millennium cameras. These are pinhole cameras designed to take very long exposure images, analogous to solarigraphy, but not focused on the sun. The ASU Art Museum has committed to a month-long exhibition of a millennium camera photo in 3015.

== Writing career ==
Keats is also the art critic for San Francisco magazine, and writes about art for publications including Art in America, Art + Auction, ARTnews, and Artweek. He has written about art forgery for Art & Antiques and Oxford University Press published a book he wrote on the topic, "Forged: Why Fakes Are the Great Art of Our Age", in late 2012. He is also a book critic and journalist, and his reporting for Popular Science has been included in The Best American Science Writing 2007. He is a writer and commentator on new language, the Jargon Watch columnist for Wired Magazine the author of a devil's dictionary of technology, and a book of essays, "Virtual Words: Language on the Edge of Science and Technology", which Oxford University Press published in October 2010. Each chapter examines the co-evolution of language and society in terms of a novel word, such as exopolitics and in vitro meat. Keats is a fiction writer as well, the author of two novels, The Pathology of Lies, published in English by Warner Books, and Lighter Than Vanity, published exclusively in Russian by Eksmo. The Book of the Unknown, a collection of fables loosely based on Talmudic legend, was published by Random House in February 2009 and awarded the Sophie Brody Award by the American Library Association in 2010. While the stories are said by Kirkus Reviews to have "echoes of Isaac Bashevis Singer, Sholom Aleichem and S.Y. Agnon", Salon.com compares them to The Princess Bride ("without the gloss"). Since publication, the most persistent question has been whether the author Jonathon Keats is the same person as the conceptual artist. (A reviewer for the New York Observer even deconstructed his Wikipedia entry.) However Keats has assured interviewers that the writer and artist are the same person, telling Salon that his fables, like his art, are a form of thought experiment.

== Bibliography ==
Selection of works includes:

=== Fiction ===
- Keats, Jonathon; Novokshenova, Maria (2006). Химеры Хемингуэя / Khimery Kheminguėi︠a︡ (also called Lighter than Vanity: A Novel) (in Russian). Moscow: Ėksmo. ISBN 978-5-699-16445-5. OCLC 71756071.

=== Nonfiction ===
- Keats, Jonathon (1999). The pathology of lies. New York, NY: Warner Books. ISBN 0-446-67445-1. OCLC 39692330.
- Keats, Jonathon (2007). Control + alt + delete : a dictionary of cyber slang. Guilford, Conn.: Lyons Press. ISBN 978-1-59921-039-1. OCLC 80360865.
- Keats, Jonathon (2009). The book of the unknown : tales of the thirty-six. New York: Random House Trade Paperbacks. ISBN 978-0-8129-7897-1. OCLC 226291744.
- Keats, Jonathon (2010). Virtual words : language on the edge of science and technology. New York: Oxford University Press. ISBN 978-0-19-975093-1. OCLC 667231105.
- Keats, Jonathon (2013). Forged : why fakes are the great art of our age. Askews & Holts Library Services. New York. ISBN 978-0-19-931137-8. OCLC 890899401.
- Keats, Jonathon (2016). You belong to the universe : Buckminster Fuller and the future. New York. ISBN 978-0-19-933824-5. OCLC 936117937.

=== Art and curatorial work ===
- Keats, Jonathon (2006). Yod the inhuman : a fable. Berkeley, CA: Judah L. Magnes Museum. ISBN 9780976150923. OCLC 1036926117.
- Keats, Jonathon; Efimova, Alla; Judah L. Magnes Museum (2006). The first intergalactic art exposition. Berkeley, CA: Judah L. Magnes Museum. OCLC 84679857.
- Keats, Jonathon (2009). Zayin the profane : a fable. Berkeley, CA. ISBN 978-0-9761509-6-1. OCLC 880943815.
- Keats, Jonathon; Crocker Art Museum (2011). The photosynthetic restaurant: gourmet sunlight for plants : a recipe book. Sacramento, CA: Crocker Art Museum. OCLC 1088564435.
- Keats, Jonathon (2012). Food For Thought: Cloning Celebrity. AC Institute. ISBN 978-0984130979.
- Keats, Jonathon; Wertheim, Margaret (2019). Antennae #47 Experiment. AntennaeProject. ISBN 978-0578537054.
- Keats, Jonathon; Paparoni, Demetrio (2019). Gottfried Helnwein : the epiphany of the displaced. Milano, Italy. ISBN 978-88-572-3989-7. OCLC 1143496650.
- Thought experiments : the art of Jonathon Keats. Jonathon Keats, Julie Decker, Alla Efimova, William L. Fox, Michael John Gorman, Ariane Koek. Munich, Germany. 2021. ISBN 978-3-7774-3427-8. OCLC 1244801491.

=== Essays and reporting ===
- Keats, Jonathon (September 2013). "Failure". 20 Things You Didn't Know About ... Discover. 34 (7): 74.
