= Canteen (magazine) =

- Discipline: Literary journal
- Language: English

Publication details
- History: 2007-2013 or 2014
- Frequency: Biannual

Standard abbreviations
- ISO 4: Canteen

Indexing
- ISSN: 1936-3168

Links
- Journal homepage

Canteen was an English-language literary and arts magazine published twice a year for a total of eight issues. Founded in 2007 by publisher Stephen Pierson, editor-in-chief Sean Finney, executive editor Mia Lipman, and former art director Sai Sriskandarajah, the magazine asked its contributors to reveal their creative process to the reader. As described by Finney, "Canteen is the literary magazine that comes with instructions." "Canteen was born at the restaurant of the same name in San Francisco, where chef Dennis Leary hosted literary salons." The magazine had offices in Brooklyn, NY, and San Francisco, CA.

== Content ==
Canteen consisted of photos, essays, fiction, nonfiction, poetry, and paintings by both well-known and amateur writers and artists. In addition to input from published authors and celebrated artists, the magazine accepted submissions of written and visual work from readers through their website. Issue five of Canteen was named "Book of the Week" by the arts blog Large Hearted Boy and WORD Bookstore in Brooklyn for skillfully combining word and image.

== Anatomy of a Photo Contest ==
In 2010, Canteen held a photo contest that was designed to reveal the decision-making processes behind such competitions, which are sometimes criticized for their opaque nature. The magazine published the comments and critiques of the contest's judges in full, as well as the response of one of the critiqued artists. The competition was judged by Brooklyn Museum director Arnold Lehman and photographer Matthew Porter. Winning entries, along with other images selected from the contest's submissions, were presented in a show at the powerHouse Arena in DUMBO, Brooklyn in August 2010.

== canTeens (tutoring program) ==
In September 2008, Canteen launched a literacy tutoring program for middle school students in Harlem, NY. The workshops were designed to increase the students' confidence in their work, as well as encouraging them to continue writing and to share it with others. Workshops were taught by contributing Canteen authors such as Porochista Khakpour, Gina Gionfriddo and Garth Risk Hallberg, and other authors such as Lorraine Adams and Amy Braunschweiger. At the end of each semester, the students' work was compiled into a professionally designed and printed magazine that was nationally distributed.

== Outwrite ==
Outwrite was a flash-fiction writing contest created by Canteen that pitted an established writer against literary novices who had never been published, deciding the winner based on audience response. In the inaugural contest in Los Angeles on April 12, 2010, Dana Goodyear (poet and New Yorker staff writer) competed against unknowns Bradley Spinelli and A. Wolfe. Wolfe's piece garnered the best audience reaction and took home the grand prize. Canteen intended more Outwrite events to be held in New York, Boston, Philadelphia, Madison, Washington D.C., and San Francisco.

The magazine produced its eighth issue in 2012. It stopped publishing the following year and was believed defunct by late 2014.

== Notable Contributors ==
Matthew Porter (photographer)
Tao Lin (author)
Dana Goodyear (poet)
Benjamin Kunkel (author)
Joyce Maynard (author)
Nathaniel Rich (author)
Stephen Elliott (author)
Ben Fountain (author)
Porochista Khakpour (author)
Po Bronson (author)
Stephen Shore (photographer)

== Distribution ==
Canteen achieved national distribution through Disticor with its first issue in 2007. It was sold at most Barnes & Noble locations in the U.S. and Canada, as well as at independent bookstores around the country.
