= Quick Fiction =

- Editor in Chief: Jennifer Pieroni
- Categories: Literary magazine
- Frequency: Biannually
- Founded: 2001
- Final issue: 2012
- Company: JP Press
- Country: United States
- Based in: Salem, Massachusetts
- ISSN: 1543-8376

Quick Fiction was a contemporary bi-annual literary magazine published in the United States. The journal's publishing focus was on the narrative prose poem/flash fiction, and they proved instrumental in providing both newer and veteran writers the opportunity to showcase their work. Many of the authors published in Quick Fiction were creating new paths in the areas of narrative prose poetry and flash fiction, and the journal was facilitating that exploration. In an interview with a Gazette reporter, Adam Pieroni described the journal's artistic bent, saying they publish mostly magical realism. It was in circulation between 2001 and 2012.

== History ==
Quick Fiction began in 2001 in Jamaica Plain, Massachusetts, as a publishing collaboration between Adam and Jennifer Pieroni. Adam was the publisher, while Jennifer was the editor-in-chief. More staff members, including Dana Burchfield, was added to the roster since the journal's inception. The headquarters of the magazine later moved to Salem, Massachusetts.

The magazine covered stories and narrative prose poems under 500 words. Boston's Weekly Dig, the weekly arts magazine, said Quick Fictionwas “filled with great work from writers who respect the rigid, potentially gorgeous contours of microfiction and have a great deal to say in very little time.”

Quick Fiction ceased publication in 2012.

== External list ==
- Official site
