= Beth Spotswood =

American writer (born 1978)

Beth Spotswood Daza (born January 28, 1978), known professionally as Beth Spotswood, is a writer, blogger and columnist based in San Francisco.

== Early life and education ==
Born in San Francisco, California, and raised in Mill Valley, California, Spotswood attended St. Ignatius College Preparatory in San Francisco and Philadelphia University graduating in 1996 and 2000, respectively. Her father is former Mill Valley Mayor and current Marin Independent Journal columnist Dick Spotswood.

== Career ==
After graduating in 2000, Spotswood returned to San Francisco and worked as a backstage dresser at Steve Silver's Beach Blanket Babylon for four years. She later joined KPIX-TV as a web producer. In 2005, Spotswood was announced as the associate producer and development director of the Mountain Play Association, a non-profit organization that convenes an annual outdoor theatre experience at the Cushing Amphitheatre in Mill Valley, California. She had joined the organization a year before as the box office manager and volunteer coordinator.

In 2007, she was hired as a columnist by the San Francisco Chronicle to write for their culture blog. From 2010 to 2017, Spotswood and San Francisco Examiner columnist Melissa Griffin hosted “Necessary Conversations,” a weekly webshow exploring local politics and events that “regularly [covered] everything from the San Francisco Mayor's Race to the dating habits of Republicans.”

In 2016, Spotswood started working as a weekly columnist for the San Francisco Chronicle. Her writing has been featured in the San Francisco, 7x7, Porchlight Storytelling series, Litquake, Muni Diaries, The Bold Italic, Discovery Channel, Slow News Day, and KGO Radio.

In 2017, she joined Alta Journal as a digital editor where she hosts a weekly virtual event series called “Alta Live”. As of 2026, she works at Alta as the special projects coordinator.

== Awards and recognition ==
In 2011, Spotswood was announced as the Reader's Choice for 7x7 Magazine's “Hot 20 Under 40.”

Spotswood and Alta’s assistant editor Jessica Blough won second place for “Alta Live”, in the Blog/Commentary category at the San Francisco Press Club’s 2023 Journalism Awards. “Alta Live” also earned third place in the Series/Continuing Coverage category.

Spotswood and Blough won second place at San Francisco Press Club’s 2024 Journalism Awards for the Talk/Public Affairs category.

== Personal life ==
Spotswood lives in Novato, California with her husband and son born in 2018.
