= Kapitoil =

2010 novel by Teddy Wayne

- First edition
- Author: Teddy Wayne
- Language: English
- Publisher: Harper Perennial
- Publication date: 2010
- ISBN: 978-0-06-187321-8 (first edition)
- Dewey Decimal: 813.6
- LC Class: PS3623.A98 K37

Kapitoil is a 2010 novel by Teddy Wayne published by Harper Perennial.

== Summary ==
In the summary of Michael K. Walonen,

Kapitoil recounts three months in the life of Karim Issar, a young Qatarian computer scientist/businessman who has traveled to Manhattan in October 1999 to work for an investment firm debugging its computer system in anticipation of Y2K. In short order Karim develops a program he names Kapitoil that allows high profit gain through predicting fluctuations in the oil futures market by clandestinely monitoring the language of news reports on the Middle East and using algorithms to anticipate how the perceptions of world events they generate will impact the market. The success of Karim’s program leads him to advance rapidly in his firm while a romantic relationship with a co-worker blossoms, but moral conflict encroaches when he is faced with the choice of selling the intellectual property rights to his boss or disseminating them freely through an academic paper suggesting the applicability of its predictive mechanism to dealing with outbreaks of disease in the developing world. The narrative ends with Karim choosing the latter course and boarding a plane back to Qatar, where he will study biology to help further his epidemiology project and work in the small store owned by his father, with whom he has had a strained relationship for some time.

Issar's liberation from the narrow world-views of neoliberal finance is achieved partly through his reading of The Grapes of Wrath and Of Mice and Men by John Steinbeck.
