= Teddy Wayne =

American novelist and short story writer (born 1979)

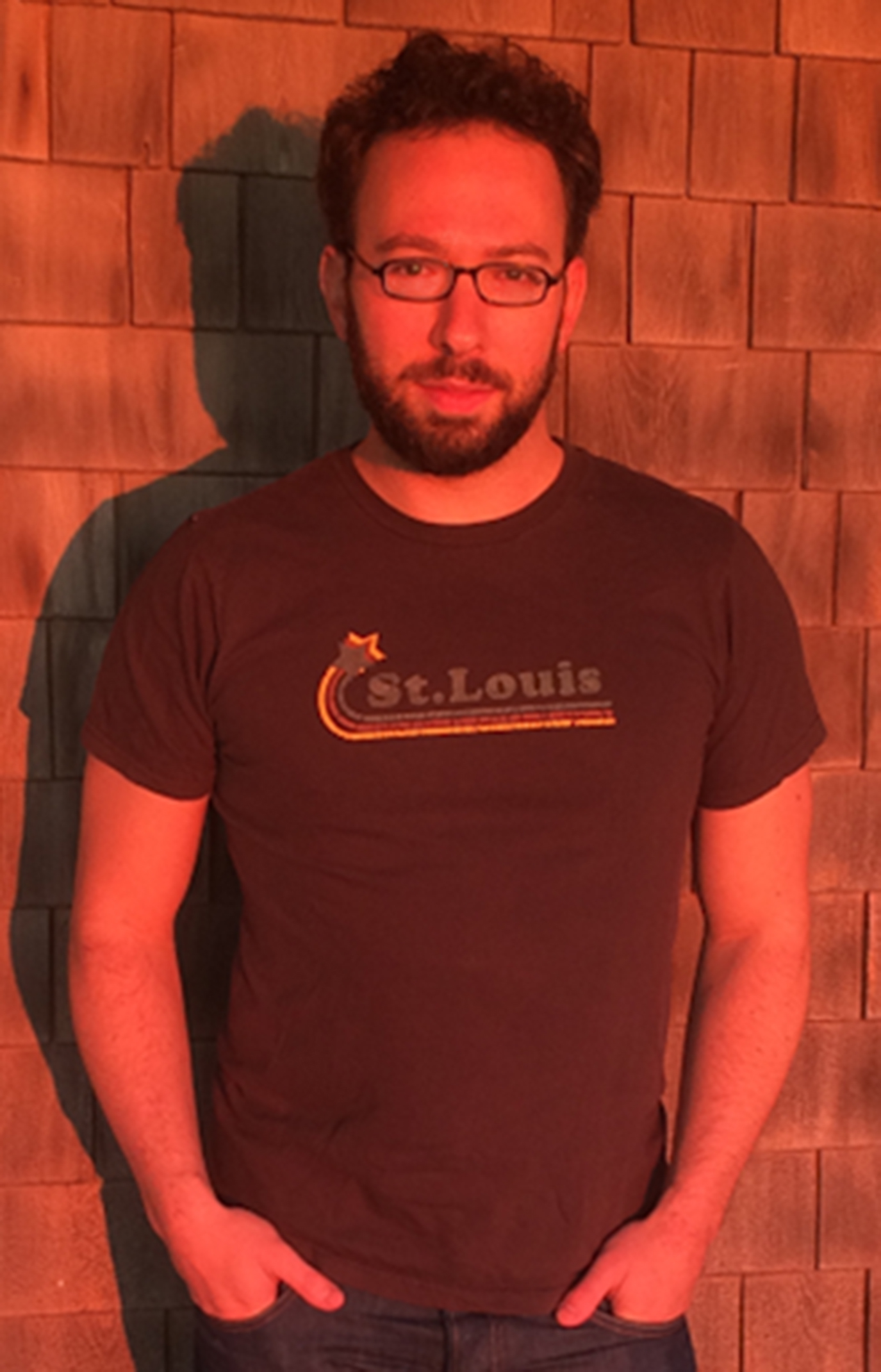
- Teddy Wayne
- Born: 1979 (age 46–47); United States
- Occupations: Columnist, author
- Writing career
- Language: English
- Genres: Non-fiction, fiction

Teddy Wayne (born 1979) is an American novelist and short story writer whose books include The Love Song of Jonny Valentine (2013) and Loner (2016). He is a frequent contributor to The New Yorker, McSweeney's, and many other publications.

== Biography ==
Wayne was raised in New York City in a secular humanist household; he has Jewish ancestry. After graduating from Harvard University in 2001, he received his Master of Fine Arts in creative writing at Washington University in St. Louis in 2007. During graduate school, Wayne began writing a novel about a Qatarian computer programmer whose moral code is challenged when he joins a Wall Street investment firm. Published in 2010 as Kapitoil, the book received critical acclaim.

His novel The Love Song of Jonny Valentine, about the public meltdown of a Justin Bieber-like 11-year-old pop star, was published in 2013. Wayne has said that the book was partly inspired by the vulnerability he felt after publishing his first novel, explaining, "I started wondering, how do actual celebrities deal with it? If I’m getting this worked up over a bad Amazon review, how would you deal with the tabloids?" He researched Jonny Valentine by poring over celebrity magazines and reading biographies of former child stars such as Jackie Coogan, Tatum O'Neal, and Drew Barrymore.

His 2016 campus novel Loner tells the story of David Federman, a Harvard freshman and a victim of toxic masculinity who begins stalking one of his female classmates. HBO announced plans to produce a television series based on Loner in 2019, with Wayne attached to write the pilot and co-executive produce the series.

In 2020, Wayne published Apartment, a novel about the complicated friendship between two male writers who meet while attending Columbia University's MFA program in 1996. Wayne is currently working on his fifth novel, about "a New Yorker on the edges of bourgeois society, critical of everything around him."

In May 2024, he published The Winner about a young law student from a poor background in Yonkers, who accepts a summer job as a tennis coach in the wealthy community of Cutters Neck, Massachusetts. On December, it was revealed the novel was being adapted into a movie under Tom Holland's production company Billy17.

Wayne lives in Brooklyn with his wife, the writer Kate Greathead, and their two children. From 2014 to 2018, he wrote a column about technology titled Future Tense for The New York Times's Style section.

== Bibliography ==
=== Novels ===
- Wayne, Teddy (2010). Kapitoil. Harper Perennial.
- — (2013). The love song of Jonny Valentine. Free Press.
- — (2016). Loner. Simon & Schuster.
- — (2020). Apartment.
- — (2022). The Great Man theory.
- — (2024). The Winner.

=== Essays and reporting ===
- Wayne, Teddy (March 25, 2013). "I work hard and I play soft". Shouts & Murmurs. The New Yorker. 89 (6): 51.
- — (February 3, 2014). "The Saccharine Method". Shouts & Murmurs. The New Yorker. 89 (47): 32.
- — (October 4, 2021). "The Age of Monsters". Shouts & Murmurs. The New Yorker. 97 (31): 27.
- — (May 16, 2022). "Tucker Carlson on the alien invasion". Shouts & Murmurs. The New Yorker. 98 (12): 27. (Note: Title in the online table of contents is "Tucker Carlson defends the aliens—extraterrestrial ones".)

=== Critical studies and reviews of Wayne's work ===
Loner

- Corrigan, Maureen (September 14, 2016). "A first year college student finds himself outclassed in 'Loner'". NPR.
- Kreizman, Maris (September 13, 2016). "Teddy Wayne's Loner sheds light on the plight of all the sad, insecure young men". Esquire.

———————

== Awards ==
- 2010 National Endowment for the Arts Fellowship
- 2011 Young Lions Fiction Award finalist
- 2011 PEN/Bingham Prize runner-up
- 2011 Dayton Literary Peace Prize finalist
- 2011 Whiting Award
