= Dennis Leary =

American restaurateur and chef

Dennis Leary is a restaurateur and chef based in San Francisco, California. Leary owns and operates six food and beverage businesses in the San Francisco area, along with a forty-acre farm in Capay Valley called Andromeda Farm. The six restaurants include Rx, Café Terminus, Natoma Cabana, Golden West, House of Shields, and the Sentinel.

== Early life and education ==
Dennis Leary began his professional culinary career at the age of 14 as a dishwasher at The Red Lion Inn in his hometown of Cohasset, Massachusetts. By the time he graduated high school he had moved on to become a line cook.

Leary attended Wheaton College and studied English literature. At Wheaton College, he joined the academic honor society Phi Beta Kappa. While attending college, he worked at both Kimball's, also in Cohasset, and at the Parker House Hotel in Boston.

== Career ==
After college, Leary moved on to line cook positions at the Boulders Resort in Scottsdale and at the Carmel Valley Ranch in California. It was then that Leary met Alain Rondelli, who hired him to work as pastry chef at his restaurant in San Francisco. A year later Dennis started at Drew Nieporent's Rubicon as sous chef and became executive chef. Leary served as executive chef for six years before moving on to start his own restaurant.

In 2005, Leary started his own restaurant and bar called Canteen. Located in the Commodore Hotel, Leary was the sole chef and owner of the 20-seat restaurant.

In 2008 Leary partnered with Eric Passetti and opened The Sentinel, a sandwich shop in downtown San Francisco. The Sentinel became known for its corned beef sandwich with Russian dressing. The two also opened The Golden West, serving breakfast and lunch on weekdays.

During 2009, Leary and Passetti joined the bar business and took over the lease of the House of Shields in SoMa. The House of Shields has been in existence since 1908, and Leary refurbished the space to fix the vintage light fixtures, statues, and floors.

In July 2014 Leary opened up Natoma Cabana with Passetti on Natoma Street. Natoma Cabana is set in a former blacksmith's shop, with the interior of the bar dating back to 1913. Leary commissioned local graffiti artist, Ian Ross, to design the front of Natoma Cabana.

Dennis Leary reopened the location of Trocadero Club as RX in November 2014. Rx is a craft cocktail bar in the Tenderloin. The name comes from the prohibition era, when a doctor's prescription was one's only way to legally access liquor.

== Awards ==
- 2014 – Eater Awards: Empire Builder
