= Will Clarke (novelist) =

American novelist

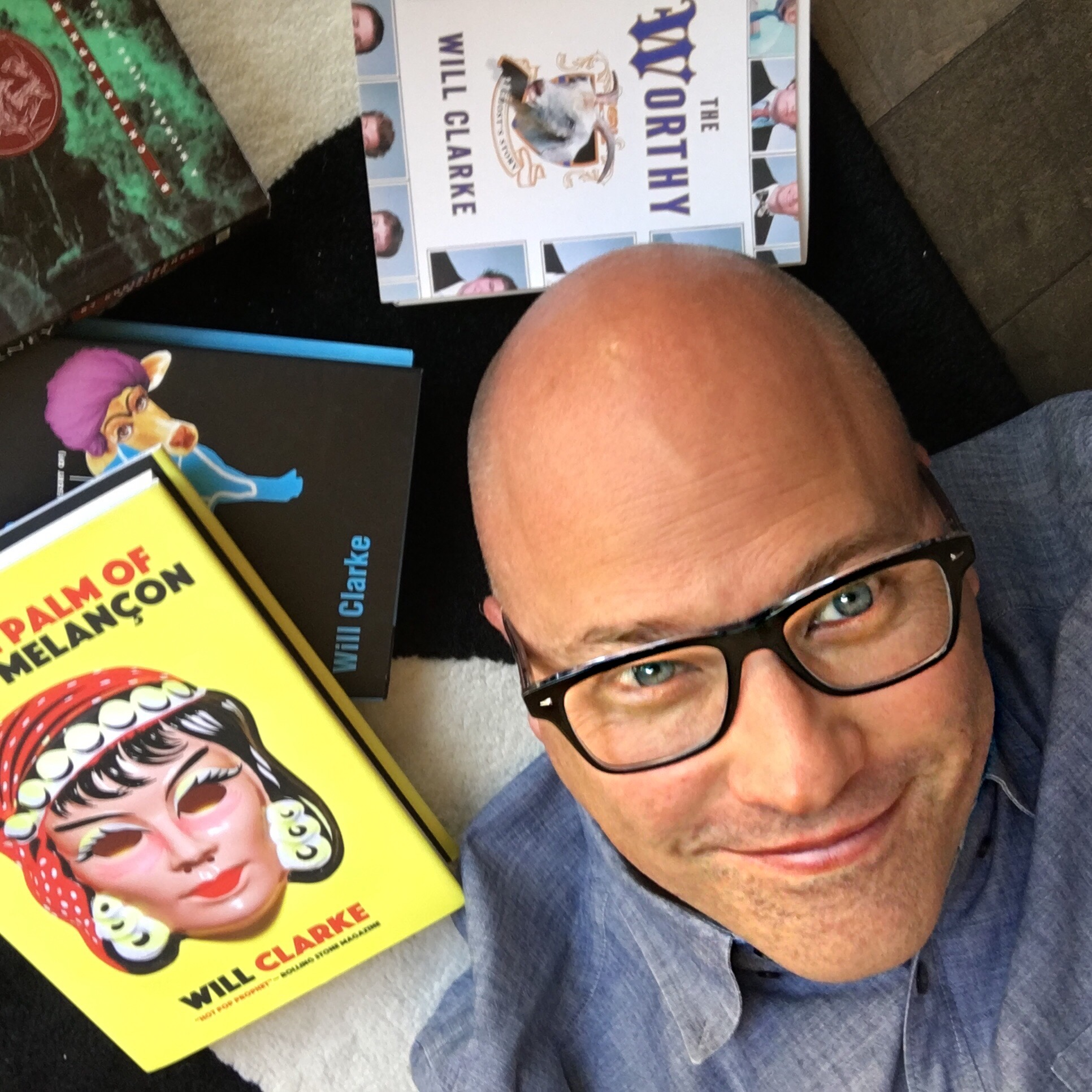
- Will Clarke in Dallas, Texas in 2017

Background information
- Born: August 13, 1970 (age 56)
- Origin: Shreveport, Louisiana, U.S.
- Genres: Fiction
- Years active: 2003–present
- Label: publisher: Simon & Schuster
- Website: WillClarke.com

Will Clarke (born August 13, 1970) is an American novelist who is the author of Lord Vishnu's Love Handles: A Spy Novel (sort of), The Worthy: A Ghost's Story,The Neon Palm of Madame Melançon and Marigold: The Secret to Manifestation. A native of Shreveport, Louisiana, Clarke originally self-published his first two books via the Internet and independent books stores like Book Soup in Los Angeles, BookPeople in Austin, and Elliott Bay Book Company in Seattle. Clarke's books eventually became underground hits in the early part of the 2000s. He later republished the books in hardback with Simon & Schuster and sold the movie rights to Hollywood. Both Lord Vishnu's Love Handles: A Spy Novel (sort of) and The Worthy: A Ghost's Story were selected as The New York Times Editors' Choice while Clarke was named the "Hot Pop Prophet" by Rolling Stone magazine in 2006. The Neon Palm of Madame Melançon was listed as one of Kirkus Review's Best Books of 2017.

Will Clarke holds an MFA in creative writing from University of British Columbia and is known for using the supernatural (a psychic dot-com millionaire and the ghost of a dead frat boy) to trick the cynical eye into seeing the madness of the mundane.
