= Hot Metal Bridge (journal) =

American literary magazine

Hot Metal Bridge was the official literary magazine for the University of Pittsburgh’s graduate Department of English. Founded in 2001 as Nidus, Hot Metal Bridge published fiction, poetry, creative nonfiction, literary criticism, and book reviews. Hot Metal Bridge had an open submissions policy and strove to publish a combination of established writers along with unpublished or emerging talent.

In summer 2009, Hot Metal Bridge held the first annual Hot Metal Bridge Fiction Contest, judged by Tom Perrotta.

Hot Metal Bridge has not published since 2019.

== Notable contributors ==
- Russell Banks
- Charles Baxter
- Michael Byers
- Dan Chaon
- Maxine Hong Kingston
- Andrew Lam
- Don Lee
- Michael Martone
- Kevin Moffett
- Jesse Nathan
- Stewart O'Nan
- Tom Perrotta
- Michelle Wildgen
