= Nelly Reifler =

American novelist

- Education: Hampshire College (BA); Sarah Lawrence College (MFA)
- Occupation: Writer
- Writing career
- Genres: Literary fiction, Mystery fiction
- Notable awards: Henfield Prize (1996)

Nelly Reifler is an American short story writer and novelist. She is perhaps best known for her short fiction collection, See Through, and her debut novel, Elect H. Mouse State Judge, published by Faber & Faber in August 2013. Her three-part essay, "Blue Spark," was republished in Electric Literature in 2026.

== Early life and education ==
Reifler grew up in New York, the daughter of a writer and a dancer. She enrolled at Harvard University as a sophomore at age 17, but later transferred to Hampshire College. She received her Master of Fine Arts from Sarah Lawrence College.

== Career ==
Reifler began her career as an assistant to Paul Auster from 1997–2005, co-editing a collection with him titled I Thought My Father Was God. Her stories have been published in various literary journals, including Guernica, Failbetter, Black Book, BOMB, The Fiddleback, Sleepingfish, jubilat, Post Road, and McSweeneys. The anthology Indelible in the Hippocampus (2019) includes an essay by Reifler. She has been a MacDowell Fellow and Western Michigan University Writer-in-Residence.

Her debut collection, See Through, was published in 2003. Kirkus Reviews described it as "Fourteen stories range from photographically realistic to Kafkaesque, as newcomer Reifler casts an unflinching eye on the damage caused by the imperfect morality of her characters, adult and child both."

Reifler's second book and debut novel, Elect H. Mouse State Judge: A Novel, a detective noir, was published by Faber & Faber in 2013. Rebecca Huval at ZYZZYVA wrote that the novel "joins the pantheon of morality tales centered on rodents—Aesop’s Fables, Maus, An American Tail: Fievel Goes West. Her slim volume sets itself apart from the pack with a riveting detective story that remixes Dashiell Hammett and Toy Story, along with a freakish sense of humor."

She teaches creative writing at Sarah Lawrence College, where she was the Ellen Kingsley Hirschfeld Chair in Writing 2021-2024. She has also taught at Pratt Institute and Columbia University.

== Partial bibliography ==
Collections

- See Through: Stories. Simon & Schuster. 2003. ISBN 9780743236089.

Novels

- Elect H. Mouse State Judge: A Novel. Faber & Faber. 2013. ISBN 9780865477650.

Anthology (featured)

- Indelible in the Hippocampus: Writings From the Me Too Movement. McSweeney's. 2019. ISBN 9781944211714.
