= Carmen Papalia =

Canadian artist

Carmen Papalia (born 1981) is a blind artist from Vancouver, British Columbia. His practice focuses on "creative wayfinding", the use of alternative modes of navigation without visual cues. Papalia is known for his performances. This includes a performance in Santa Ana, California where Papalia was guided only by a marching band playing predetermined audio cues for physical obstacles and navigation. Papalia also conducts non-visual walking tours for sighted people. In 2015, Papalia proposed an anti-policy approach to accessibility "rethinking of the terms on which all of us care for and coexist with one another" in his Open Access conceptual framework.

Papalia filed a complaint against his landlord through the BC Human Rights Tribunal. His complaint involved his right to use cannabis for pain relief in a non-smoking household. The landlords objected due to their own disability, asthma. In December 2023 the BCHRT found the landlords did not discriminate. The panel found that this was a "disability on disability" matter and the landlords did not have to risk their own health to accommodate Papalia.

== Education ==
Papalia holds a Bachelor of Fine Arts from Simon Fraser University in Vancouver and a Master of Fine Arts from Portland State University.

== Career ==
Papalia has exhibited at the Whitney Museum, Craft Contemporary, the Grand Central Art Center, the Cantor Fitzgerald Gallery at Haverford College, the Portland Art Museum, the Columbus Museum of Art, the Vancouver Art Gallery and the Museum of Modern Art in New York.

He has been artist in residence at the Victoria and Albert Museum in London, and the Model Contemporary Arts Centre in Ireland.
