= Artifice =

American literary magazine

- Categories: Literary magazine
- Founded: 2009
- Final issue: 2017
- Country: United States
- Based in: Chicago
- Language: English
- ISSN: 2151-7843
- OCLC: 464214803

Artifice was a nonprofit literary magazine based in Chicago, Illinois. It was published from 2009 to 2017.

== History and profile ==
Artifice was started in 2009. It was co-founded by Rebekah Silverman, who served as Managing Editor, and James Tadd Adcox, who served as editor-in-chief. It was published biannually. Later Peter Jurmu became the editor-in-chief of the magazine replacing James Tadd Adcox in the post.

In 2011 Artifice was awarded a City of Chicago Community Arts Assistance Program (CAAP) Grant. In 2010, the magazine was awarded the Best Submission Guidelines by Philistine Press for the Artifice wishlist," which requests such submissions as "3 of the saddest sentences ever written," "1 geometrical proof," "2 fits, 2 starts," "4 labyrinths created using parentheses, footnotes, endnotes, etc," and "something that includes a Greek chorus."

Artifice was a division of Artifice Books, a small press. Artifice Books' first project, released in 2012, was Exits Are an e-book by Mike Meginnis (and many players), published in conjunction with Uncanny Valley. Later the magazine began to be published annually by Curbside Splendor Publishing. Artifice folded in 2017.
