= Bob McKenty =

American writer

- Occupation: Poet
- Writing career
- Genre: light verse

Bob McKenty is a poet noted for his mastery of light verse.

McKenty, a graduate of the University of Notre Dame, began writing poems during the long daily commute from his home in Matawan, New Jersey to work at the Equitable Insurance Company in Manhattan. His poetry—always formal and humorous—has appeared in The New York Times, Light Quarterly, The Formalist, Reader's Digest, The Wall Street Journal, Playboy, and McCall's, as well as anthologies by Random House and others. X. J. Kennedy has lauded him as "one of the most skillful writers of light verse in America", and in 1999 he won the Howard Nemerov Sonnet Award, the only time that award has been given for a work of light verse.

McKenty was an active member of the Bards' Buffet, a group of light poets (including Alma Denny, Willard R. Espy, Louis Phillips, and Maureen Cannon) who occasionally dined together in New York City. In 2005 he published a volume of poetry on baseball, and as of 2006 was making an annual recitation at the National Baseball Hall of Fame.

== Bibliography ==
- Bob McKenty. Fallout from the Nuclear Family. Northwind, 1995. ISBN 978-1880764022.
- Bob McKenty. Fair Game: Open Season on Baseball. Doggerel Daze, 2005. ISBN 978-0972282031.
