= Maureen Cannon =

American poet

Maureen Cannon (November 22, 1922 – January 25, 2007) was an American poet. She published more than 1,000 poems in Good Housekeeping, Ladies' Home Journal, McCall's, Reader's Digest, Light Quarterly, and a great variety of other publications. She was a regular contributor, always in verse, to more than one section of The New York Times.

Cannon's prolific publishing career did not begin until she was in her 40s, when a friend sent two of her poems to Babytalk magazine. She became a member of the Bards' Buffet, a group of light poets (including Alma Denny, Willard R. Espy, Louis Phillips, and Bob McKenty) who occasionally dined together in New York City, and won prizes for both her serious and her light verse.
