= Limerick (disambiguation) =

Limerick is a city in Ireland.

Limerick may also refer to:

== Arts and entertainment ==
- Limerick (poetry), a form of verse, often humorous and sometimes rude, in five-line, predominantly anapestic meter, with a strict rhyme scheme of AABBA
- Limerick (song), a traditional humorous drinking song with many obscene verses

== Places ==
=== Ireland ===
- County Limerick, Ireland, the county where the city Limerick is located
- Limerick, County Wexford, a townland; see List of townlands of County Wexford

=== Canada ===
- Limerick, Ontario
- Limerick, Saskatchewan

=== United States ===
- Limerick, Georgia
- Limerick, Louisville, Kentucky
- Limerick, Maine
- Camanche, California, formerly Limerick
- Limerick Township, Pennsylvania
  - Limerick Generating Station
- New Limerick, Maine
- San Ramon, California, formerly Limerick

=== Australia ===
- Limerick, New South Wales

== Constituencies ==
=== Before 1801 ===
- Askeaton (Parliament of Ireland constituency)
- Kilmallock (Parliament of Ireland constituency)
- Limerick City (Parliament of Ireland constituency)
- County Limerick (Parliament of Ireland constituency)

=== 1801–1885 ===
- Limerick City (UK Parliament constituency)
- County Limerick (UK Parliament constituency)

=== 1885–1922 ===
- Limerick City (UK Parliament constituency)
- East Limerick (UK Parliament constituency)
- West Limerick (UK Parliament constituency)

=== 1921–1923 ===
- Kerry–Limerick West
- Limerick City–Limerick East

=== 1923–1948 ===
- Limerick (Dáil constituency)

=== 1948–2011 ===
- Limerick East (Dáil constituency)
- Limerick West (Dáil constituency)

=== 2011–2016 ===
- Limerick (Dáil constituency)

=== 2011– ===
- Limerick City (Dáil constituency)

=== 2016– ===
- Limerick County (Dáil constituency)

== People ==
- Alison Limerick, British singer
- Earl of Limerick, a British noble title
- Patricia Nelson Limerick, American historian

== Other uses ==
- Limerick F.C., an Irish association football team
- Limerick (horse), a New Zealand Thoroughbred race horse
- Limerick lace, a variety of needle lace
- PS Limerick, a paddle steamer

== See also ==
- LYMErix, a vaccine against Lyme disease
