= Kees Stip =

Dutch epigram poet (1913–2001)

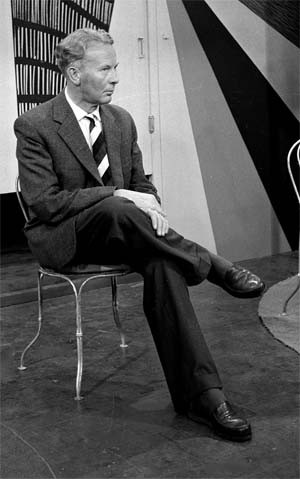
Kees Stip

Cornelis Jan (Kees) Stip (Veenendaal, August 25, 1913 – Winschoten, June 27, 2001) was a Dutch epigram poet. He wrote under many pseudonyms, most notably Trijntje Fop and Chronos.

== Biography ==
Stip studied classical languages at the Rijksuniversiteit Utrecht (National university Utrecht). He was a member of the student society Unitas, where he met Albert Alberts, Leo Vroman, and Anton Koolhaas.

In the Second World War, his poem Dieuwertje Diekema was distributed illegally. The poem was a persiflage of the poem Mária Lécina (1932) written by J.W.F. Werumeus Buning.

After the war, Stip worked as a copywriter for the Dutch army's press agency and the Dutch government's press agency. From 1951 to 1979, he was an editor at the Polygoon cinema newsreel.

In 1950, Stip composed a poem collection, Vijf variaties op een misverstand ("Five variations on a misunderstanding"), about the misadventures of Pyramus en Thisbe, in the style of five Dutch authors: Speenhoff, Jan Prins, Nijhoff, Gorter, and Vondel.

=== Trijntje Fop ===
From 1951 onwards, he wrote under the pen name Trijntje Fop (borrowed from one of the poem-writing classmates of Woutertje Pieterse) animal poems for the Dutch newspaper de Volkskrant. Throughout the years, he wrote many hundreds, that were published in various magazines and collections. Also, he wrote various materials for Wim Kan.

A large collection of poems by Trijntje Fop appeared in 1988 as Het Grote Beestenfeest ("The Large Animal party"). The animal poems are of a very consistent pattern. Never any smuggling with the Metre (poetry): every line, without exception, has four stresses. The rhyme scheme is always AABBCC (an epigram or paired rhyme). Just like a limerick, somewhere in the verse, often in the first line, the name of a town is mentioned. Most Trijntje Fop verses contain six lines; occasionally, it will be eight lines, and every now and then an even higher number of lines. Some verses also have two lines only. Sometimes, the last lines contain an old-fashioned formulated pseudo-wise lesson for children.

The complete poems Kees Stip, including the Trijntje Fop poems, were released in 1993 under the title Lachen in een leeuw ("laughing in a lion"). This title was borrowed from the poem Op een spreeuw ("on a starling").

Possibly the most famous Trijntje Fop poem is Op een bok ("on a billy goat") from the collection Het Grote Beestenfeest. This verse has its own statue, the Siddebuurster bok, in the Dutch town of Siddeburen since 1978, with the poem on its pedestal. Originally, the statue was located on the Oudeweg road, but it was later moved to the corner of Poststraat and Lougpadje.

== Comics ==
In the early 1970s he and cartoonist Nico Visscher made the newspaper comic De Wolken. Stip wrote the gags.

== Kees Stip Prize ==
In 1985, the literary magazine De tweede ronde ("the second round") founded the Kees Stip Prijs for light verse. After Stip himself as the first recipient, the following authors have been crowned: Drs. P, Driek van Wissen, Jan Boerstoel, Ivo de Wijs, Marko Fondse, Patty Scholten, Kees Jiskoot, Frank van Pamelen, and Jaap van den Born.
