= Apostolate =

Christian service and evangelism organization

An apostolate is a Christian activity or organization "directed to serving and evangelizing the world", most often associated with the Anglican Communion or the Catholic Church. In more general usage, an apostolate is an association of persons dedicated to the propagation of a religion or a doctrine. The word apostolate comes from the Greek word ἀποστέλλω (apostellō), which means to "send forth", to "commission", or "to dispatch".

The Christian origin of the word comes from the twelve apostles who were selected by Christ; they had a "special vocation, a formal appointment of the Lord to a determined office, with connected authority and duties". An "apostolate" can refer to a Christian organization made up of lay people or of a specific Christian religious order.

Within Anglican theology and Catholic theology, "ministry" pertains to the administration of a sacrament, or the celebration of liturgy and all that pertains to the liturgical functioning of the Church; as such it is specific to those with Holy Orders. Lay people have a different role, namely, to spread the truth of Christianity in the world through whatever means they can: this work is properly called "an apostolate". In the Catholic church, the Second Vatican Council's Decree on the Ministry and Life of Priests (Presbyterorum ordinis) refers to priests' ministry as an "apostolate", indeed a single apostolate to which "all priests are sent as co-workers ... whether they engage in parochial or extra-parochial ministry", while the Council's Decree on the Apostolate of the Laity (Apostolicam Actuositatem) states that a Christian believer's vocation is "by its very nature ... also a vocation to the apostolate".

The lay apostolate is made up of lay people, who are neither consecrated religious nor in Holy Orders, who exercise a ministry within the Catholic Church. Lay apostolate organizations operate under the general oversight of pastors and bishops, but need not be dependent upon them for direction.

Lay people can exercise a fruitful apostolate by their conduct in the areas of their work, profession, studies, neighborhood, and social life, and according to the Second Vatican Council's Decree on the Apostolate of the Laity, they will look for opportunities to announce Christ to their neighbors through the spoken word as well.

== Examples ==
An example of a Catholic apostolate is Catholic Answers, run by lay people, whose mission is to spread the Gospel of Jesus Christ and Catholicism in the world. The Opus Dei prelature has been described as fulfilling "an apostolate". Stella Maris, the church's organisation concerned with the mission to seafarers, is referred to as an "apostolate" of the Catholic Church, the American Crossroads Initiative describes itself as "an apostolate of Catholic renewal and evangelization", and the Courage Apostolate or Courage International is another apostolate within the Church.

An example of an Anglican apostolate is the Saint Martin Apostolate of Prayer, whose aim is the "sanctification of all priests through the continual offering of prayers on their behalf by the faithful".

== Lay apostolates in the Catholic church ==
In the Catholic Church, the Second Vatican Council has been seen as elevating the laity "from passive spectators to involved members". It was the first council in church history to specifically address the place of the laity in the life of the church.

The Council affirmed that, while many lay Catholics felt like passive spectators at Mass, their participation in worship "as 'a chosen race, a royal priesthood, a holy nation, a redeemed people' (1 Pet. 2:9; cf. 2:4-5), is their right and duty by reason of their baptism" (Sacrosanctum Concilium, paragraph 14). The Council asked lay Catholics to move away from the false belief in their own passivity, which also characterized their approach to the apostolate. Exceptions were charitable organizations like St. Vincent de Paul Societies and the Knights of Columbus, and developments in the 1950s which included diocesan, national and international activities promoting the work of lay people in the church and in the world. But largely the task of teaching the faith was entrusted only to priests and religious sisters.

The Council promoted the active participation of lay people in its liturgy, and also restored to lay people "a much broader and richer participation in its apostolic life. Apostolicam Actuositatem described the apostolate of lay people as "directed to the evangelization and sanctification of men and to the penetrating and perfecting of the temporal order through the spirit of the Gospel", portraying lay people as continually exercising "faith, hope, and charity", "do[ing] good to all men, especially to those of the household of the faith". The decree set out a "plan for the spiritual life of the laity" which

"should take its particular character from their married or family state or their single or widowed state, from their state of health, and from their professional and social activity. They should not cease to develop earnestly the qualities and talents bestowed on them in accord with these conditions of life, and they should make use of the gifts which they have received from the Holy Spirit.
Furthermore, the laity who have followed their vocation and have become members of one of the associations or institutes approved by the Church try faithfully to adopt the special characteristics of the spiritual life which are proper to them as well. They should also hold in high esteem professional skill, family and civic spirit, and the virtues relating to social customs, namely, honesty, justice, sincerity, kindness, and courage, without which no true Christian life can exist."

The apostolate of married persons and families is given a special place within Apostolicam Actuositatem:

"It has always been the duty of Christian married partners but today it is the greatest part of their apostolate to manifest and prove by their own way of life the indissolubility and sacredness of the marriage bond, strenuously to affirm the right and duty of parents and guardians to educate children in a Christian manner, and to defend the dignity and lawful autonomy of the family."

The decree adds that married couples can help engaged couples in their preparation for marriage.

It goes on the add that the "heightened influence" of young people in society "demands of them a proportionate apostolic activity", in which their "zest for life" and "ready eagerness to assume their own responsibility" would drive their apostolic endeavours. Similarly, while there is a clear mandate for individual believers to carry out an apostolate in their own situation, and "where Catholics are few in number and widely dispersed", the Council's view was that "in the present circumstances, it is quite necessary that ... the united and organized form of the apostolate be strengthened".

The need for a body within the Holy See concerned with "the service and promotion of the lay apostolate" was anticipated by the Council. Pope Paul VI established the Pontifical Council for the Laity in the period after the Council. Since the Council, lay Catholics have exercised leadership in many apostolates, such as organizing charitable works and advocacy groups on behalf of the poor and oppressed. With a declining number of priests and sisters, lay persons have also undertaken the responsibility for religious education and fill more and more administrative positions at Catholic schools. The council also specified that parents are the primary religious educators of their children. And It taught that “the secular employment of laypeople, far from being a distraction from their Christian vocation, was their primary way to sanctify, not only themselves but society.”

In 2013, Francis Cardinal Arinze explained that lay persons "... are called by Baptism to witness to Christ in the secular sphere of life; that is in the family, in work and leisure, in science and cultural, in politics and government, in trade and mass media, and in national and international relations." Arinze noted that there are many things individuals may accomplish for Christ quietly without belonging to a particular association. In other instances, organizations are more efficient to address challenges beyond the capacity of one person.

Pope Francis continually criticized clericalism and emphasized that all are "one, holy People of God". He emphasized that the "hour of the laity" had arrived and decried clericalism as rife in the Church, saying that it "leads to the functionalization of the laity, treating them as 'messengers'."

In November 2019, Pope Francis addressed the new Dicastery for the Laity, Family, and Life during its first plenary assembly which addressed the topic, "The Lay Faithful, Identity and Mission in the World". He urged them to use their talents as "missionary disciples" to address the various challenges of the whole Church and world, to be "visible signs" of the presence of Christ in every environment. He warned against "clericalizing the laity": "Move the deacons away from the altar. … They are the custodians of service, not first-class altar boys or second-class priests." In his first Apostolic Exhortation as Pope, he had entitled a section "We are all missionary disciples" and he returned to the term seven times in that exhortation. He has also pointed out that "In truth, the laity who have an authentic Christian formation do not have need of a 'bishop-pilot' or a 'monsignor-pilot', or of clerical input to assume their proper responsibilities, on all levels: from the political to the social, from the economic to the legislative!" He called rather for bishops to be encouraging toward lay apostolates, good shepherds.

== See also ==
- Apostle (Christian)
- Christian ministry, as age-specific ministry, creative and performing arts, community service and outreach.
- Apostolate for Family Consecration
- Sodality
