= Naiad Einsel =

American artist and illustrator (1927–2016)

Naiad June Einsel (June 6, 1927 in Philadelphia, Pennsylvania – April 3, 2016 in Westport, Connecticut) was an American commercial illustrator and artist. Over the course of her career, Einsel completed artwork for magazines, newspapers, and brands. Einsel, along with husband Walter, was inducted into the Society of Illustrators' Hall of Fame in 2008.

== Biography ==
Einsel was born Naiad June Giblan in Philadelphia, PA in 1927. Her father owned a grocery store, where she would draw on the brown wrapping paper. She attended the High School of Music and Art in New York City, going on to attend, and graduate from Pratt Institute in 1947. In 1952, Einsel met her future husband, Walter Einsel, when he came to CBS seeking employment, and in 1953 they married. Their similar illustration styles allowed them to work collaboratively. In the mid-1960s, the Einsels moved from their town house in New York City to an 1853 Victorian home in Westport, CT. In Westport, Einsel became active in the Westport Historical Society and other local causes, including the Save Cockenoe campaign for which she designed a poster.

== Career ==
Upon graduation from Pratt, she remained in New York City and attained a position as an assistant in the promotions department of Seventeen magazine. Her staff work at Seventeen attracted the attention of advertisers, and she began to take on freelance assignments on her nights and weekends. After a year at Seventeen, Einsel left to become an assistant to graphic designer Paul Rand at the Weintraub Agency. In 1949 her work was included in The 28th Annual Exhibition of Advertising and Editorial Art of the New York Art Directors Club at the Museum of Modern Art. After three years of working for Rand, Einsel began a job as an art director in the promotions department of CBS. While at CBS she frequently collaborated with art director Lou Dorfsman. During this period her illustration work began appearing regularly in the New York Times, and she continued to take on freelance work in addition to her duties at CBS. By the close of the 1950s, Einsel was working full-time as a freelance illustrator.

For the next three decades, Einsel continued to create artwork for a variety of clients. A partial list of magazine clients includes: Redbook, Esquire, Collier's, Look, Good Housekeeping, The Ladies' Home Journal, Woman's Day, Family Circle, Cosmopolitan, The New York Times, Travel & Leisure, Food & Wine, and Smithsonian magazine. Over the course of her career she designed album covers, movie posters, and TV commercials. Her advertising clients include M&M, Xerox, Procter & Gamble, Dubonnet and Chase Manhattan. Naiad has also illustrated books for Doubleday, Macmillan, Random House, Harcourt Brace & Jovanovich, Clarkson Potter, Reader's Digest, and Workman Press. She also designed a line of towels for Fieldcrest, dishes, ornaments, and crystal for Dansk, and games for Colorforms.

In 1973, Einsel and her husband created stamps for the U.S. Postal Service commemorating "Progress in Electronics". In 1981 she designed a second stamp for the U.S.P.S., this time a holiday stamp featuring a teddy bear on a sleigh.

== Other work ==
For 46 years, Naiad and Walter Einsel created elaborate Valentines for one another. This project was the catalyst for a large portion of her work. Her illustrations, rubber stamp collages and other assemblages were collected in the 2008 book Art from the Heart. From 1974 to 1976, Einsel designed and oversaw the production of the Westport Bicentennial Quilt. The 76" by 104" quilt project involved 33 women, and took over two years to complete.

In 1996, Naiad and Walter were involved in the interior design and restoration of a seven-sided barn at the Westport Historical Society.

== Books ==
- The Adventures of Pinocchio (1963, Macmillan) by: C. Collodi with illustrations by Naiad Einsel
- Know Your Toes (And Other Things to Know) (1963, C.N. Potter, 1963.) by: William North Jayme and Roderick Cook designed and illustrated by Naiad Einsel and Walter Einsel
- ShrinkLits (1970, DoubleDay) by Maurice Sagoff with illustrations by Naiad Einsel
- Nine Fine Gifts by (1962 Parents' Magazine Press) Evelyn White Minshull with illustrations by Naiad Einsel
