= Edward Dowling =

Edward Dowling may refer to:

- Edward J. Dowling (1875–?), American lawyer and politician from New York
- Edward Dowling (priest) (1898–1960), Jesuit priest and spiritual advisor
- Eddie Dowling (1889–1976), American actor, screenwriter, playwright, director, producer, songwriter, and composer
