= Dawn Eden Goldstein =

American author and journalist (born 1968)

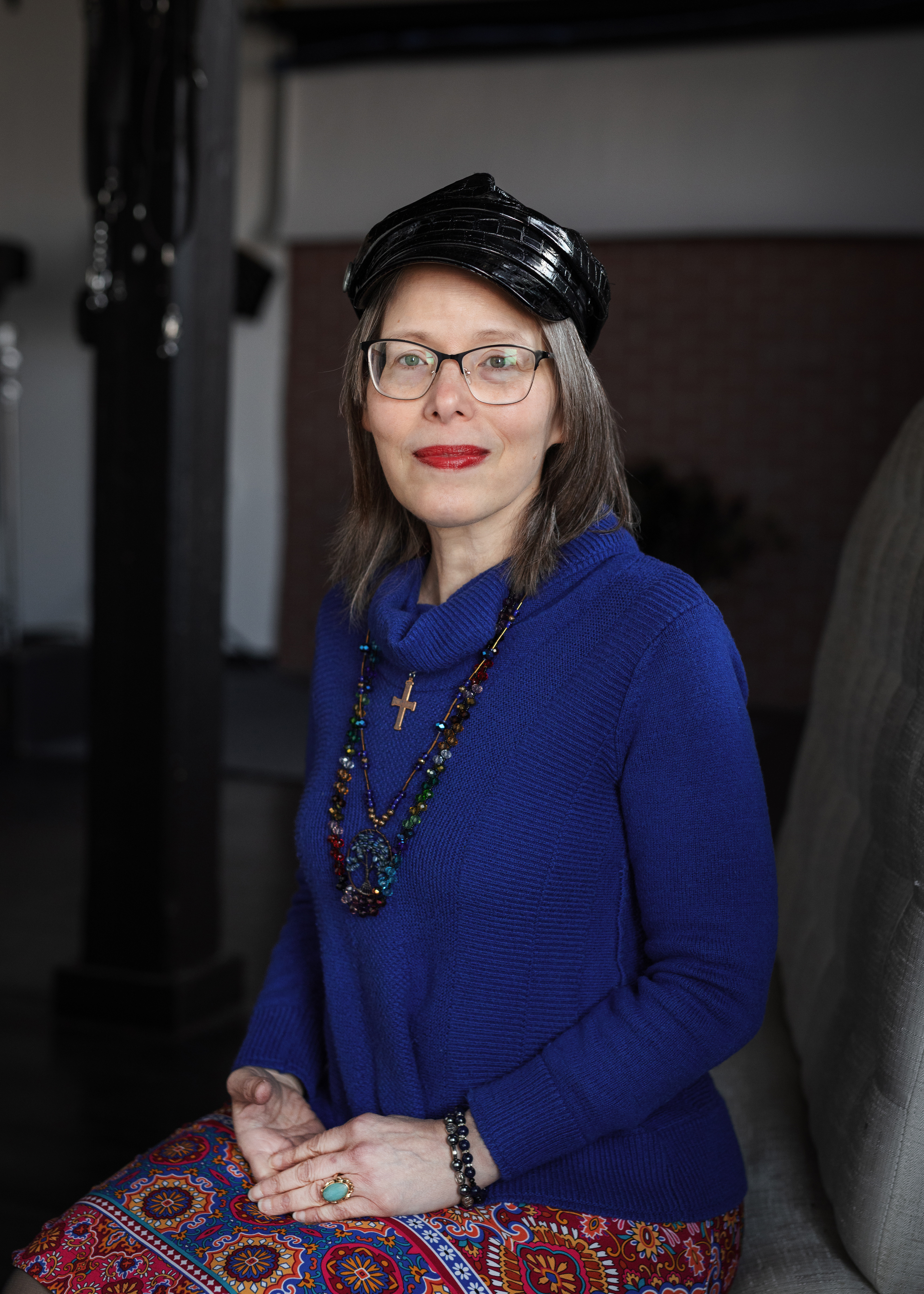
- Portrait of American author and theologian Dawn Eden Goldstein
- Born: September 3, 1968
- Education: New York University; Pontifical Faculty of the Immaculate Conception at the Dominican House of Studies; University of St. Mary of the Lake
- Occupations: Author, theologian, canon lawyer, journalist
- Writing career
- Language: English
- Years active: 1985–present
- Subjects: Roman Catholicism, music
- Website: The Dawn Patrol

Dawn Eden Goldstein is an American author, theologian, canon lawyer, journalist, and songwriter. She was formerly a rock music historian and tabloid newspaper headline writer. Prior to 2016, she wrote under the pen name Dawn Eden.

She is the grand-niece of poet Alma Denny.

== Early career ==
Goldstein began writing about rock music under the abbreviated name "Dawn Eden" in 1985 for fanzines, eventually becoming a popular-music historian, writing for Mojo, Salon, New York Press, and Billboard, among others. In 1989 she graduated from New York University with a degree in communications.

From 1990 through the early 2000s, she wrote liner notes for more than seventy CD reissues. Artists she interviewed include Harry Nilsson, Del Shannon, and Lesley Gore.

She spent years researching and championing the music and life of sunshine pop progenitor Curt Boettcher and wrote liner notes for several collections of his work.

== Religious conversion and subsequent career ==
In 1999, Goldstein, born in a Reform Jewish household, had a "born-again" experience that led her to become a Protestant Christian. In 2006, she was received into the Roman Catholic Church.

She worked as a copy editor at the New York Post from early 2002 to January 2005. A headline she wrote about a toilet-bowl collapse ("Hurt in line of doody") won first place in the "Brightest Headline" category of the 2004 New York State Associated Press Awards. She was forced to leave the Post after edits she made to a story about in vitro fertilization revealed her pro-life sympathies. The firing led The New York Observer to publish a front-page profile of her by George Gurley, "Eden in Exile".

Goldstein was hired in April 2005 by the New York Daily News as assistant news editor of its newly relaunched National Edition. She later became deputy news editor for the newspaper's new weekly regional editions.

Goldstein left the Daily News in 2007 to move to Washington, D.C., where, in 2008, she was successfully treated for thyroid cancer.

In May 2010, she received an M.A. in theology from the Dominican House of Studies after defending her master's thesis, a critique of Christopher West's presentation of Pope John Paul II's theology of the body. Three months later, after Alice von Hildebrand cited Goldstein's research in her own critique of West, the Catholic News Agency made the thesis available for download.

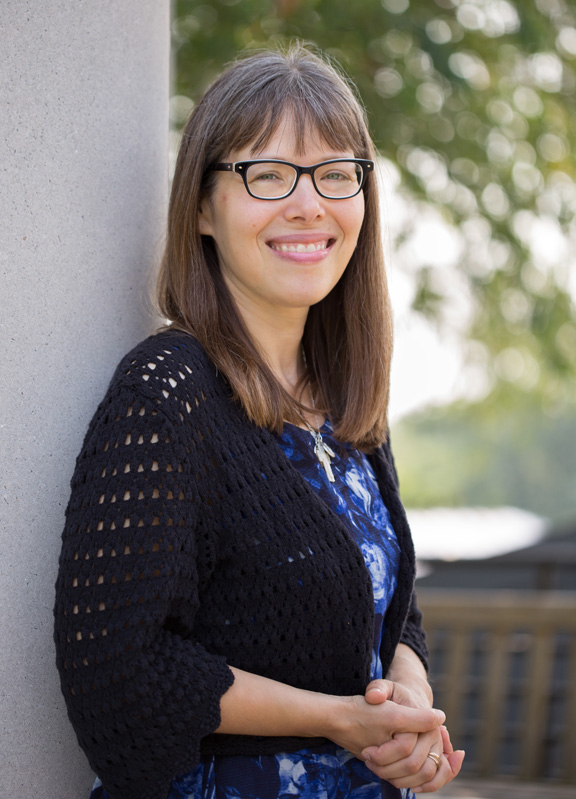
Goldstein during her theology studies in 2015

After receiving her sacred theology licentiate from the Dominican House of Studies in 2014, Goldstein began working toward a Doctor of Sacred Theology degree at the University of St. Mary of the Lake.

In May 2016, Goldstein became the first woman in the University of St. Mary of the Lake's history to receive a Doctor of Sacred Theology degree. Around this time, after years of writing under the name "Dawn Eden," she reclaimed her birth surname, as reported in the Chicago Tribune.

From September 2017 to May 2019 she served as assistant professor of Dogmatic Theology at Holy Apostles College and Seminary, in Cromwell, Connecticut.

In May 2023, Goldstein received a licentiate in canon law from the Catholic University of America School of Canon Law. She appeared on CNN's The Lead with Jake Tapper on May 8, 2025, to discuss the election of fellow canon lawyer Pope Leo XIV to the papacy. In June 2025, she was made the Director of the Tribunal and an Ecclesiastical Judge of the Diocese of Bridgeport in Connecticut.

== Books ==
Her first book The Thrill of the Chaste was published by Thomas Nelson in December 2006; she promoted it with appearances on the Eternal Word Television Network and NBC's Today Show. The Thrill of the Chaste (Catholic Edition), a revised version of her 2006 work, was issued in January 2015 by Ave Maria Press.

Goldstein's second book, My Peace I Give You: Healing Sexual Wounds with the Help of the Saints, was published in April 2012 by Ave Maria Press. In November 2012, on the Eternal Word Television Network television program The Journey Home, she told the story of her conversion to the Catholic faith and spoke about healing from childhood sexual abuse.

Her third book, Remembering God's Mercy: Redeem the Past and Free Yourself from Painful Memories, was published by Ave Maria Press in February 2016. She discussed the book in an interview with Kathryn Jean Lopez at National Review. The book won first place in the Inspirational category of the Association of Catholic Publishers 2017 Excellence in Publishing Awards.

In March 2019 her fourth book, Sunday Will Never Be the Same: A Rock & Roll Journalist Opens Her Ears to God, was published by Catholic Answers. It was the first book published under Goldstein's full birth name. The work recounts Goldstein's spiritual journey "from the temples of her childhood Judaism to the music clubs of Greenwich Village, where she became an acolyte of a new religion: rock & roll". Thereafter the book chronicles Goldstein's eventual conversion to Roman Catholicism. (The book's title, Sunday Will Never Be the Same, alludes to a 1967 Top 10 hit by the pop group Spanky and Our Gang.)

Goldstein's fifth book, Father Ed: The Story of Bill W.'s Spiritual Sponsor, published by Orbis Books in November 2022, was a biography of Father Edward Dowling, SJ. Publishers Weekly called it "a powerful take on an often overlooked spiritual influence on Alcoholics Anonymous." The book won a 2023 Christopher Award in the Books for Adults category.

In July 2024, Goldstein announced in her online newsletter that she had entered into an agreement with University of Notre Dame Press to write another Jesuit biography, A Priest in Good Trouble: Father Louis J. Twomey, S.J.'s Battle for Human Dignity with MLK in the Deep South.

Loyola Press published Goldstein's sixth book, The Sacred Heart: A Love for All Times, in March 2025.

== Music ==
Goldstein is a pop songwriter whose titles have been recorded by The Anderson Council, Steve Wynn (of the Dream Syndicate), and Juniper.

The Anderson Council's recording of "Alone With You," which Goldstein co-wrote with the band's Peter Horvath, reached #1 on the Radio Indie Alliance Top 75 Songs for the week of May 1, 2023. Her song "Times on the Thames," recorded by the Anderson Council and likewise co-written by Horvath, was the most-played song on "Little Steven" Van Zandt's SiriusXM show Underground Garage and its sister station The Coolest Songs in the World (a.k.a. Stevie's Coolest Songs) during the week of May 27, 2023.

Goldstein has also released her own recordings, which are available on Bandcamp.

== Bibliography ==
=== as Dawn Eden ===
- The Thrill of the Chaste: Finding Fulfillment While Keeping Your Clothes On. Nashville, TN: Thomas Nelson. 2006. ISBN 084991311X.
- My Peace I Give You: Healing Sexual Wounds with the Help of the Saints. Notre Dame, IN: Ave Maria Press. 2012. ISBN 978-1594712906.
- The Thrill of the Chaste: Finding Fulfillment While Keeping Your Clothes On (Catholic ed.). Notre Dame, IN: Ave Maria Press. 2015. ISBN 978-1594715587.
- Remembering God's Mercy: Redeem the Past and Free Yourself from Painful Memories. Notre Dame, IN: Ave Maria Press. 2016. ISBN 978-1-59471-636-2.

=== as Dawn Eden Goldstein ===
- Sunday Will Never Be the Same: A Rock and Roll Journalist Opens Her Ears to God. San Diego, CA: Catholic Answers Press. 2019. ISBN 978-1683571193.
- Father Ed: The Story of Bill W.'s Spiritual Sponsor. Maryknoll, NY: Orbis Books. 2022. ISBN 978-1626984868.
- The Sacred Heart: A Love for All Times. Chicago, IL: Loyola Press. 2025. ISBN 978-0-8294-5874-9.
