= Double dactyl =

Fixed verse form

The double dactyl is a verse form invented by Anthony Hecht and Paul Pascal in 1951.

== Form ==
Like the limerick, the double dactyl has a fixed structure, is usually humorous, and is rigid in its prosodic structure. The double dactyl's prosodic requirements are more strenuous due to its increased length, and its specific requirements as to subject matter and word choice much more rigid, making it significantly more difficult to write.

There must be two stanzas, each comprising three lines of dactylic dimeter ( ¯ ˘ ˘ ¯ ˘ ˘ ) followed by a line consisting of just a choriamb ( ¯ ˘ ˘ ¯ ). The last lines of these two stanzas must rhyme. Further, the first line of the first stanza is repetitive nonsense, and the second line of the first stanza is the subject of the poem, which in the purest instances of the form is a double-dactylic proper noun. (Hecht and other poets sometimes bent or ignored this rule, as in the Robison poem below.) There is also a requirement for at least one line, preferably the second line of the second stanza, to be entirely one double dactyl word. Some purists still follow Hecht and Pascal's original rule that no single six-syllable word, once used in a double dactyl, should ever be knowingly used again.

An example by John Hollander:

Higgledy piggledy,
Benjamin Harrison,
Twenty-third president
Was, and, as such,

Served between Clevelands and
Save for this trivial
Idiosyncrasy,
Didn't do much.

Metapoetically, Roger L. Robison (Note: Roger L. Robison, not to be confused with Roger L. Robinson.) crafted this poem describing itself: (Note: Sonnets and haikus await his analysis; metapoetics could fill a whole shelf.)

Long-short-short, long-short-short
Dactyls in dimeter,
Verse form with choriambs
(Masculine rhyme):

One sentence (two stanzas)
Hexasyllabically
Challenges poets who
Don't have the time.

The Dutch version, called ollekebolleke after a children's verse, was introduced in the Dutch language by Drs. P.

== McWhirtle ==
A McWhirtle is a light verse form similar to a double dactyl, invented in 1989 by American poet Bruce Newling. McWhirtles share essentially the same form as double dactyls, but without the strict requirements, making them easier to write. Specifically:

- McWhirtles do not require a nonsense phrase (e.g., "Higgledy piggledy") on the first line.
- There is no requirement for a double-dactylic word in the second stanza.
- There is an extra unstressed syllable added to the beginning of the first line of each stanza.
- Although the meter is the same as in a double-dactyl, syllables may move from the end of one line to the beginning of the next for readability. This plus the extra unstressed syllable makes McWhirtles essentially an informal double amphibrach.

The looser form allows poets additional freedom to include additional rhymes and other stylistic devices.

The form is named after the fictional protagonist in an early example by Newling, included with his original written description of the form, dated August 12, 1989; but his first McWhirtle, in which his friend "Skip" Ungar is the protagonist and which also appeared with his original description, was:

The Piano Player

I read in the papers
That Harry F. Ungar
Performs in a night spot
Near soigne Scotch Plains,

Caressing the keyboard
While affluent yuppies
Are eating and drinking
Their capital gains.

The first published description of the McWhirtle, with examples, was in E.O. Parrott, ed., How to Be Well-Versed in Poetry, London: Viking, 1990, pp. 197–200; and the verse form was also described in Anne H. Soukhanov, Word Watch - The Stories Behind the Words of Our Lives, New York: Henry Holt and Company, 1995, pp. 388–89.

An example by American poet Kenn Nesbitt:

Fernando the Fearless

We're truly in awe of
Fernando the Fearless
who needed no net
for the flying trapeze.

Alas, what a shame
it's surprisingly difficult
catching a bar
in the midst of a sneeze.

== In literature ==
- The first published collection of double dactyls was Jiggery-Pokery: A Compendium of Double Dactyls, edited by Anthony Hecht and John Hollander. Many of the poems had previously appeared in Esquire starting in 1966.
- John Bellairs's classic fantasy novel The Face in the Frost (1969) contains several double dactyls, used as nonsense magic spells.
- The first published collection of double dactyls by a single author was Centicore Poems, [Series] I; being, A Non-canonical Collection of Entirely Prejudiced Double Dactyls "perpetrated by Jay Dillon" (Ann Arbor, Michigan: Dactylomaniac Press, 1972), OCLC (Worldcat) no. 498258515. Only one copy of this book is known to survive, in the British Library (London), General Reference Collection shelfmark X.902/1639.
- Abbreviated Lays is a 2003 collection of double dactyl poetry about Roman history.

== See also ==
- Double amphibrach
- Light verse
