= Joyce La Mers =

American poet

- Born: 1920; Billings, Montana
- Died: 2013 (aged 92–93)
- Occupation: Poet
- Writing career
- Genre: Light verse

Joyce La Mers (1920 – October 2013) was an American writer of light poetry.

== Biography ==
La Mers was born Joyce Duncan in Billings, Montana in 1920, the third child and only daughter of a successful livestock dealer. The Duncan family was devastated during the Great Depression, losing the family farm, and moved to Fresno, California in 1938. During World War II La Mers dropped out of Fresno State University, where she was pursuing a degree in journalism, and later married her boyfriend Tom Carlile. She worked as a homemaker and mother to the couple's two children until their divorce 17 years later, and subsequently got a job as a secretary and then as a copy writer at an advertising firm. Her 1960, marriage to her second husband, design engineer Herbert La Mers, produced one daughter, and lasted until his death in 2003.

La Mers published her first poem in The Southern Churchman when she was seven years old. Since then her poetry has appeared in The Wall Street Journal, The Saturday Evening Post, Collier's, Light Quarterly, and several anthologies. Her work, usually humorous and always metrical, has been characterized as "a marriage of Dorothy Parker and Ogden Nash". In 2007 she pledged half a million dollars to Light Quarterly, then the US's only literary magazine devoted to light verse, to ensure its continued publication. The terms of the gift resulted in the establishment of a non-profit organization, the Foundation for Light Verse, which now publishes the magazine.

La Mers, a great-grandmother and 40-year resident of Oxnard, California, continued to publish and give public readings of her poetry up until her death in 2013. In 2013 she was honoured as a "Literary Treasure" by the government of Ventura County.

== Selected works ==
- A Christmas Collection (July Literary Press, 2001)
- The Muse Strikes Back (Story Line Press, 1997)
- Grandma Rationalizes an Enthusiasm for Skydiving (Mille Grazie Press, 1996)
