= Ethel Jacobson (American writer) =

American poet and writer (1899–1991)

Ethel Jacobson, from the dust cover of her 1955 book Mice in the Ink

Ethel Jacobson (1899 – 15 February 1991) was an American writer of light verse and a book reviewer.

== Early life and education ==
Born Ethel Sonntag in Paterson, New Jersey, she was "brought up in New York City".

Jacobson studied at the Parsons School of Design, Syracuse University, Ohio Wesleyan University and the National Academy of Design: an education in art, music, and more – although not poetry.

== Personal life ==
She married Louis John Jacobson in 1923; the couple had two daughters (described in December 1937 as thirteen and six years old). The family moved to Fullerton, California, in 1928. The couple summered in Mammoth Lakes, California. Jacobson enjoyed sketching and raising cats.

Jacobson died on 15 February 1991 in Fullerton, aged 91.

== Career ==
Jacobson reviewed books (particularly nature-related books) for the Chicago Tribune, the St. Louis Post-Dispatch, and the Santa Ana Register.

From 1933 to 1978, Jacobson contributed hundreds of poems to The Saturday Evening Post. Other periodicals to which she contributed material included All-Story Love Stories, Arizona Highways, The Atlantic Monthly, The Author & Journalist, Child Life, Collier's, Cosmopolitan, Fiction Parade and Golden Book Magazine, Good Housekeeping, Ladies' Home Journal, Life Story Magazine, Look, Liberty, Love Book Magazine, Love Story Magazine, McCall's, New Love Magazine, The New York Times, Redbook, and The Wall Street Journal.

She also wrote poems that regularly appeared within syndicated pot-pourris: "Cook-coos, by Ted Cook" (Note: "Cook-coos" was from the King Features Syndicate; it appeared in The San Francisco Examiner. Many examples can be seen at Newspapers.com.) and "Contract highlights, by Z. V. Smith". (Note: "Contract highlights" appeared in The Redwood Journal (Ukiah, California). Many examples can be seen at Newspapers.com (which anachronistically labels pre-1954 issues the Ukiah Daily Journal).)

Jacobson wrote many poems about her dog Rover. Later, she turned to writing poems about her cats. In 1972, she was quoted as saying "I've always been bats about cats", but described as working on a book about squirrels.

In 1937, Jacobson described herself as having a comfortable income from poetry, which she enjoyed writing, and as having refused offers of contracts to write dialogue for movies.

Identifying "the battle of the sexes" as "that richest of mother lodes for the light verse writer out prospecting for subject matter", the poet Richard Armour named Jacobson as one of the women – together with Dorothy Parker, Phyllis McGinley, Margaret Fishback, and Georgie Starbuck Galbraith – who had "done even better" at this than had the men.

What has been described as Jacobson's most frequently quoted verse has a darker subject:

To smash the simple atom
All mankind was intent,
Now any day
The atom may
Return the compliment. (Note: Titled "Atomic Courtesy", it has appeared in print in such diverse publications as: The Clark Panther (Clark College, Atlanta), November 1954, p. 2. (At Newspaper Archive.); The Times Recorder (Zanesville, Ohio), 17 January 1960, p. 4. (At Newspaper Archive.); The Drumheller Mail, 23 June 1976, p. 8. (At Newspaper Archive.); Sara Brewton and John E. Brewton, eds., Shrieks at Midnight: Macabre Poems, Eerie and Humorous (New York: Crowell, 1969), p. 63. ISBN 0-690-73518-9.; P. Edward Ernest, ed., The Family Album of Favorite Poems (New York: Grosset and Dunlap, 1959), p. 216. ISBN 0-448-01279-0.; William L. Masterton and Cecile N. Hurley, Chemistry: Principles and Reactions (Fort Worth, Texas: Harcourt Brace Jovanovich, 1989), p. 131. ISBN 0-03-053028-8.)

(Jacobson used the term "dark verse".)

On rare occasion, Jacobson would also write serious verse.

Jacobson's first collection of light verse, Larks in My Hair, won high praise from its reviewer in Deseret News: "a wonderful bargain – more grins and laughs for the money than in many a more widely publicized book of humor" In his review for the Los Angeles Daily News, Richard Armour too praised this "bright little book", saying that:

Of the general school of Dorothy Parker and Margaret Fishback, this writer specializes in the battle of the sexes, household pets (she is the light verse laureate on cats and dogs) and children.

The reviewer for Deseret News of Jacobson's third collection, I'll Go Quietly, described it as "on a par with" its predecessors, but gentler: "The same wit is here, but, perhaps a little softened".

Curious Cats (1969) was the first of two books to combine photographs by Florence Harrison and text by Jacobson. It won a very favorable review in The Sun-Telegram for its "really remarkable pictures of cats-in-action, all ages" and the humor and "good 'sound' [that should make it] fun to read aloud to children". The reviewer for the Arizona Republic also enjoyed it: "it was lucky for the rest of us ailurophiles that [Harrison and Jacobson] happened to meet and decide to collaborate".

In The Cats of Sea-Cliff Castle (1972), Jacobson wrote in prose. The reviewer for The Sun-Telegram called the book "a literary and photographic work of art", in its depiction of "a haven for a colony of abandoned cats". The reviewer for the Fort Worth Star-Telegram wrote that Jacobson "[provided] a poetic minimum of text for one of the most appealing picture books possible".

== Books by Jacobson ==
- Larks in My Hair. Placentia, California: Courier Press, 1952. OCLC 5928550. (Poetry collection, 103 pp.; illustrated by Jacobson; with a foreword by Richard Armour)
- Mice in the Ink. Brea, California: Progress Press, 1955. OCLC 4815420. (Poetry collection, illustrated by Jacobson, 93 pp.)
- Diamonds for Your Jubilee. Santa Ana, California: Charles W. Bowers Memorial Museum and the Orange County Historical Society, 1964. OCLC 22784688. Commemorative publication, 12 pp.)
- I'll Go Quietly. Dallas: Triangle Press, 1966. OCLC 5906016. (Poetry collection, 71 pp.)
- Curious Cats. New York: Funk & Wagnalls, 1969. OCLC 1029022866. (Poetry and prose accompanying photographs by Florence Harrison.)
- Who, Me? Dallas: Triangle Press, 1970. OCLC 5909938. (Poetry collection, 69 pp.)
- The Cats of Sea-Cliff Castle. [Los Angeles]: Ward Ritchie, 1972. ISBN 0-378-60253-5. (Accompanying photographs by Florence Harrison; about the homeless cats of the area of Corona del Mar.)
