= Louis Phillips (author) =

American poet (born 1942)

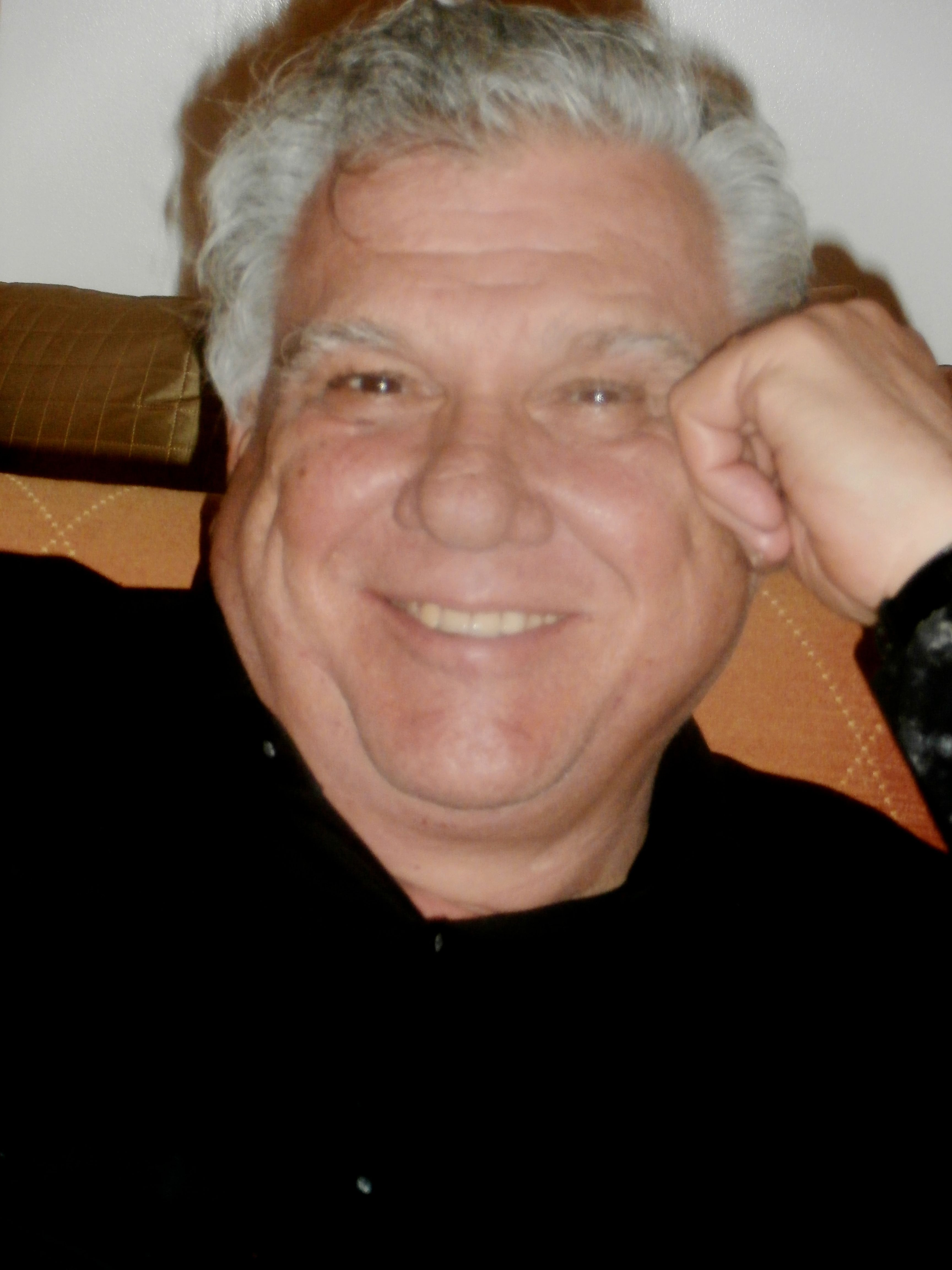
- Born: June 15, 1942; Lowell, Massachusetts, U.S.
- Occupations: Poet; writer; playwright
- Writing career
- Genres: light verse, children's literature

Louis Phillips (born June 15, 1942) is an American poet, playwright, editor, and author of children's stories.

Phillips was born on June 15, 1942, in Lowell, Massachusetts. He received a BA from Stetson University in 1964, and MAs from the University of North Carolina at Chapel Hill and CUNY in 1965 and 1967, respectively. Since 1977 he has served as professor of humanities at the School of Visual Arts in New York City, where he teaches creative writing.

Phillips has authored or co-authored around fifty books for children and adults, including five collections of short stories and several volumes of poetry. He is the editor of two Random House poetry anthologies, The Random House Treasury of Best Loved Poems and The Random House Treasury of Light Verse. He was a joint winner of a 1984 Swallow's Tale Press poetry award, and was the featured poet in the Spring/Summer 2011 issue of Light Quarterly.

His full-length plays have been performed in various New York City and American regional theatres, and his one-act plays have appeared in Aethlon, The Massachusetts Review, and The Georgia Review.

He is the brother-in-law of John Ranard, photographer.

== Bibliography ==
=== Short stories ===
- A Dream of Countries Where No One Dare Live (SMU Press, 1993)
- The Bus to the Moon and Other Stories (Fort Schuyler Press, 2002)
- The Woman Who Wrote King Lear, and Other Stories (Pleasure Boat Studio, 2008)
- Fireworks in Some Particulars and Other Writings (Fort Schuyler Press, 2010)
- Must I Weep for The Dancing Bear """(Pleasure Boat Studio, 2012)"""..

=== Plays ===
- The Envoi Messages (Broadway Play Publishers, 1985)
- The Ballroom in St. Patrick's Cathedral (Broadway Play Publishers)
- The Great American Quiz Show Scandal (Broadway Play Publishers)
- Sixteen Points on a Hurricane's Compass
- Frankenstein Virtuoso
- Kops
- Wabeck
- Goin' West
- The Man who Ate Einstein's Brain
- Tierra del Fuego, Staged Reading by the Viking Theater Company at the Arthur Seelen Theatre, The Drama Book Store, 2007
- Narragansett 1937 (World Audience Publishers, 2010), Staged Reading by the Viking Theater Company produced at the Salmagundi Art Club, 2013
- God Have Mercy on the June Bug", Staged Reading by the Viking Theater Company at the Neighborhood Playhouse, 2007

=== Poetry ===
- R.I.P.: A Poetic Sequence (Livington Press, 2003)
- The Krazy Cat Rag (Light Reprint Press, 1999)
- Bulkington (Hollow Spring Press, 1981)
- The Time, The Hour, The Solitariness of The Place (Swallow's Tale Press, 1985)
- Celebrations and Bewilderments (Fragments Press, 1975)
- Quick Flicks: Clerihews by Louis Phillips (World Audience Publishers, 2013)
- Into the Well of Knowingness (Prologue Press, 2000)
- In the Field of Broken Hearts (Prologue Press, 1990)
- Afterheat (Prologue Press, 2011)
- Amid Things Visible (Prologue Press, 2006)
- Landscape with Three Human Figures (Prologue Press, 1972)
- Memoirs of a Pin-ball Mechanic (Prologue Press, 1991)
- That More Things Move Poems (Prologue Press, 1978)
- The Applesauce Chronicles, Volume 1 (Prologue Press, 2004)
- Quick Flicks #5: Lives of the Famous, the Infamous, and the Nearly Unknown (Prologue Press, 2012)
- Radio Station WGOD is on the Air (Prologue Press, 1978)
- Boundaries (Prologue Press, 1970)
- The Emancipation of the Encyclopedia Salesman (Prologue Press, 1972)
- How Wide the Meadow, {Poetry Collection} (World Audience. Inc, 2019)
- Meadow surprises

=== Edited anthologies ===
- The Random House Treasury of Best Loved Poems (Random House, 1990)
- The Random House Treasury of Light Verse (Random House, 1995)

=== Other ===
- Hot Corner: Baseball Stories & Writing & Humo (Livingston Press, 1996)
- The Man Who Stole The Atlantic Ocean (Prentice Hall & Camelot Books, 1972)
- The Million Dollar Potato (Simon and Schuster, 1991)
- Alligator Wrestling and You: An Impractical Guide to an Impossible Sport (Avon Camelot, 1992)
- Gertrude Stein in Dayton & Other Plays (World Audience Publishers, 2008)
- American Elegies (World Audience Publishers, 2000)
- Late Night in The Rain Forest (World Audience Publishers, 2009)
- Little Known Facts About Well-Known People (Pleasure Boat Studio, 2012)
- Funky Facts (Xerox Education Publications, 1980)
- The Audience Book of Theatre Quotations (World Audience Publishers, 2007)
- The Kilroy Sonata (World Audience Publishers, 2009)
- Sex: "The Most Fun You Can Have Without Laughing" …and Other Quotations (St. Martin's Press, 1990, with William Rossa Cole)
- Sex: Even More Fun You Can Have Without Laughing (Book Sales, 1997, with William Rossa Cole)
- 263 Brain Busters: Just How Smart Are You, Anyway? (Puffin Books, 1985)
- Haunted House Jokes (Viking Juvenile, 1987, with James Marshall)
- How Do You Get a Horse out of the Bathtub? (Puffin Books, 1983)
- The Brothers Wrong and Wrong Again (McGraw Hill Higher Education, 1980, with J. Winslow Higginbottom)
- The Most Challenging Quiz Book Ever (Random House Reference, 1996)
- Ask Me Anything About the Presidents (Avon Camelot, 1992)
- The Latin Riddle Book: Aenigmatorum Liber Latinorum (Harmony, 1988)
- Monster Riddles (Puffin Books, 1998)
- The Animated Thumbtack Railroad Dollhouse & All-around Surprise Book, Evening Edition (Lippincott, 1975)
- Wackysaurus: Dinosaur Jokes (Viking Juvenile, 1991)
- The TV Almanac (Macmillan General Reference, 1994, with Burnham Holmes)
- Yogi, Babe, and Magic: The Complete Book of Sports Nicknames (Macmillan General Reference, 1994, with Burnham Holmes)
- Going Ape: Jokes from the Jungle (Viking Juvenile, 1988, with Bob Shein)
- Keep 'Em Laughing (Viking Children's Books, 1996)
- Willie Shoemaker (Crestwood House, 1988, with Michael E. Goodman)
- Theodore Jonathan Wainwright Is Going To Bomb The Pentagon: A Comic Novella (Prentice Hall, 1973)
- 505 Movie Questions Your Friends Can't Answer (Walker & Co, 1982)
- Ask Me Anything About Baseball (Avon Camelot, 1995)
- Ask Me Anything About Dinosaurs (Demco Media, 1997)
- Ask Me Anything About Monsters (HarperCollins, 1997)
- Freaky Facts (Wanderer Books, 1981)
- Baseball: Records, Stars, Feats, and Facts (Harcourt Brace, 1979)
- Football: Records, Stars, Feats, and Facts (Harcourt Brace, 1979)
- Women in Sports: Records, Stars, Feats, and Facts (Harcourt Brace, 1980)
- How Do You Lift a Walrus With One Hand? (Viking Juvenile, 1988)
- Invisible Oink (Viking Juvenile, 1993)
- School Daze: Jokes Your Teacher Will Hate (Viking Juvenile, 1994)
- Way Out!: Jokes from Outer Space (Puffin Books, 1991)
- Louis Phillips's Loose Leaf: The Wackiest School Notebook Yet (Atheneum, 1990)
- The Official Funnybones Flaky Dictionary (Wanderer Books, 1981)
- Oops! (Beaufort Books, 1982)
- What's Gnu? (Beaufort Books, 1983)
- The World by Sevens: A Kid's Book of Lists (F. Watts, 1981)
