= Marriage preparation in the Catholic Church =

Courses for Catholic adults preparing for marriage

Couples preparing to be married in a Catholic church are encouraged to take time to prepare for their marriage. Some marriage preparation courses are referred to as "Pre-Cana", including a version available online.

The term "Pre-Cana" is derived from John 2:1–12, the Wedding at Cana in Galilee, where Jesus performed the miracle of turning water into wine.

== Description ==
The purpose of marriage preparation under canon law is to make sure that people are free to marry and have the capacity to marry. Approaches to Pre-Cana vary among Catholic dioceses and parishes. Often six-month sessions are led by a priest or deacon with support from a married Catholic couple.

All Catholic dioceses in the United States require couples to spend a significant amount of time preparing for marriage. Most dioceses (over 70, as of 2004) require an initial face to face meeting with their parish deacon or priest at least 6 months prior to the wedding, with a growing trend to ask couples to complete their preparation at least 6 weeks prior to their wedding.

These courses are designed to prepare couples with a better understanding of each other and of the sacrament of marriage. These courses can have multiple different forms ranging from weekend retreats to getting matched with a sponsor couple for meetings. The United States Conference of Catholic Bishops recognizes that long distance preparation is sometime necessary due to military service or otherwise. In these instances a military or college chaplains can often provide independent preparation but the presiding minister needs to coordinate the process.

During this preparation phase, the bishops' conference considers the following topics as "must-have conversations" taking place before couples marry:

- Spirituality/faith
- Conflict resolution skills
- Careers
- Finances
- Intimacy/cohabitation
- Children
- Commitment
- Natural Family Planning

Other topics that may be covered include:

- Ceremony planning
- Family of origin
- Communication
- Marriage as a sacrament
- Sexuality
- Theology of the Body
- Couple prayer
- Unique challenges of military couples
- Stepfamilies
- Children of divorce

== History ==
Cana Conferences, which would go on to become Pre-Cana courses in the 1970s, began in the 1940s "to combat secularism's largest threat–its attack on the Christian family." Cana Conferences differed from Retreats and Days of Recollection as Cana Conferences focused on the growth of husband and wife together towards God, as opposed to retreats which were often segregated by sex. These conferences, however, were not limited only to Catholics as Father Edward Dowling is noted to have hosted conferences where Protestant and Jewish couples attended.

The need to help engaged couples in preparing themselves better for marriage, and the role of other lay married couples in offering support, was referenced in the Second Vatican Council's Decree of the Apostolate of the Laity in 1965.

== See also ==
- Christian views on marriage
