= Double amphibrach =

The double amphibrach is a variation of the double dactyl, similar to the McWhirtle but with stricter formal requirements. Meter and lineation are consistently amphibrachic (da DA da) rather than dactylic (DA da da), and the shortened fourth and eighth lines rhyme. In narrative sequences, the requirements that the first line be nonsense syllables and second line be a proper name are sometimes waived, but the sixth line requires a single diamphibrachic word (e.g. discriminatory, hallucinogenic, personification).

Jan D. Hodge in The Bard Double-Dactyled and Other Odd Pieces includes several pieces in this stanza form. His version of “Humpty Dumpty” begins:

As Humpty was sitting
upon a partition,
he misplaced his balance
and suffered a fall.
A sodden, unsightly
reorganization
of yolk and albumen
appeared by the wall.

Here is the seventh stanza of his rendering of Hamlet:

Laertes returns to
avenge his dead father
and finds his dear sister
half out of her mind,
her life in all senses
deteriorating:
her father’s been killed and
her lover’s unkind.

and his Taming of the Shrew concludes:

The husbands’ last wager
provides us a further
and fitting reversal
confirming this view;
the contest makes clear the
identification
we’d always suspected—
Bianca’s the shrew.
