= Concho River Review =

Texas literary magazine

- Former editors: Terry Dalrymple (founder); Jim Moore; John Wegner; Mary Ellen Hartje; Erin Ashworth-King; R. Mark Jackson
- Categories: Literary journal Creative writing Poetry; Non-fiction; Fiction
- Frequency: Biannual/Closed for publication
- Publisher: Angelo State University; Department of English and Modern Languages
- Founder: Terry Dalrymple
- Founded: 1987
- First issue: April 1, 1987; 39 years ago
- Country: United States
- Based in: San Angelo
- Language: English
- Website: conchoriverreview.org
- ISSN: 1048-9568
- OCLC: 17446948

Concho River Review was an American literary magazine based in San Angelo, Texas. The magazine was founded by Terry Dalrymple in 1987 and published short stories, poetry, creative nonfiction, interviews, and book reviews. Originally, it focused on Southwestern authors and settings but later diversified its contents, publishing works by authors from across the United States and abroad.

The final issue of CRR was 37.1, published for the spring/summer of 2023, at which time the journal went on indefinite hiatus. As of fall 2025, CRR has discontinued publication.

== Masthead ==
- General editor:
- Fiction editor:
- Nonfiction editor:
- Poetry editor:
- Book review editor:

== Notable contributors ==
- Seth Abramson
- Jacob M. Appel
- Wendy Barker
- Robert Cooperman
- Paul Dickey
- Robert Flynn
- A.C. Greene
- R.S. Gwynn
- Jane Hammons
- Rolando Hinojosa
- Walt McDonald
- Robert McGuill
- Ann McVay
- Joe Edward Morris
- Naomi Shihab Nye
- Clay Reynolds
- Ryan Shoemaker
- Roland Sodowsky
- Jan Seale
- Christopher Wood
- Alessio Zanelli

== Interviews ==
A regular component of the fall issue was an interview with the featured writer at the Angelo State University Writers Conference. CRR published interviews with featured writers since the conference's inception in 1996. Authors interviewed include Naomi Shihab Nye, Peter Hedges, Gordon Weaver, Tim O'Brien, Tobias Wolff, Luis Valdez, Terrance Hayes, Mary Karr, Leslie Marmon Silko, Art Spiegelman, Craig Johnson, Chitra Banerjee Divakaruni, and Laila Lalami.

== See also ==
- List of literary magazines
