= Walter Einsel =

American sculptor

Walter Einsel (1926–1998) was an American sculptor and illustrator from Westport, Connecticut.

== Biography ==
Einsel studied at Parsons The New School for Design, in New York, before taking on assignments from The New York Times. He eventually became art director for NBC, meeting his wife after applying for the same position with CBS. A large portion of his output, which has now become his legacy, were gifts created for his wife, Naiad Einsel. The couple shared a business as independent artists throughout the majority of his life. Together, they were the first married artists to create stamp designs for the U.S. Postal Service. They were hired together, to create an exhibition for the AT&T Age of Information Centre, producing fifty-five figures, with intricate details and moving parts. These were shown at Walt Disney World's EPCOT Center in Florida. In 2008, ten years after Walter Einsel's death, both artists were inducted into the Society of Illustrators Hall of Fame.
