= Light (journal) =

Online literary magazine

- Light № 70–71, photo: Lisa Krone
- Editor: Melissa Balmain (2013–present)
- Former editors: John Mella (1992–2012)
- Categories: Light verse
- Frequency: semiannual issues, plus topical Poems of the Week
- Publisher: Foundation for Light Verse
- Founded: 1992
- First issue: 2013 (online)
- Final issue: 2012 (print)
- Country: USA
- Based in: Chicago
- Website: https://lightpoetrymagazine.com/
- ISSN: 1064-8186

Light (formerly Light: A Quarterly of Light Verse) is an online journal that bills itself as "North America's longest-running journal of light verse."

== History and profile ==
Light was founded as a print journal in 1992 by a retired postal worker John Mella. Mella personally published the journal until 2008, when he founded the non-profit Foundation for Light Verse with a gift from poet Joyce La Mers. The Foundation, headed by Mella, took over the publication of the journal. After Mella died in 2012, the magazine was relaunched as an online-only, semiannual publication, edited by his handpicked successor, poet Melissa Balmain. The all-volunteer staff includes poets Kevin Durkin, Coleman Glenn, Allison Joseph, Julie Kane, Barbara Loots, and Gail White.

Since 2017, Light has also published Poems of the Week on Mondays, inspired by current events.

Each biannual issue (winter/spring and summer/fall) begins with a feature on a writer of light verse and includes reviews of light (or largely light) poetry collections. Sections in between have varied from issue to issue, including "Spectrum" roundups on types of light verse (Little Willies, "impossible rhymes," etc.) and an occasional column, "Historical and Hysterical," by A. M. Juster. The magazine has published the verses of Wendy Cope, Thomas M. Disch, X. J. Kennedy, John Updike, and Richard Wilbur, among many others.

== Contributors ==
Notable contributors include the following:

- Brian Allgar
- Melissa Balmain
- Bruce Bennett (poet)
- Maureen Cannon
- William Rossa Cole
- Edmund Conti
- Wendy Cope
- Alma Denny
- Paul Dickey
- Tom Disch
- Rhina P. Espaillat
- Willard R. Espy
- Gavin Ewart
- Daniel Galef
- David Galef
- Charles Ghigna
- Dana Gioia
- Albert Goldbarth
- Bill Greenwell
- R.S. Gwynn
- Donald Hall
- Julie Kane
- A. M. Juster
- X. J. Kennedy
- James Kirkup
- Richard Kostelanetz
- Joyce La Mers
- Felicia Lamport
- James Laughlin
- J. Patrick Lewis
- Amit Majmudar
- William Matthews
- Bob McKenty
- Susan McLean
- John Frederick Nims
- Chris O'Carroll
- Jack Prelutsky
- Maurice Sagoff
- Mae Scanlan
- Ed Shacklee
- Jim Siergey
- William Jay Smith
- W. D. Snodgrass
- William Stafford
- A.E. Stallings
- Timothy Steele
- Marilyn L. Taylor
- John Updike
- Gail White
- John Whitworth
- Richard Wilbur
- David Yezzi
