= Paul Dickey (poet) =

American poet

Paul Dickey (born 1948 in Hardtner, KS) is an American poet, author, philosophy instructor, and playwright who has published multiple books of poetry and a full-length play, The Good News According to St. Dude, that analyzes and dramatizes the disillusion of the 1960s youth counter-culture.

== Career ==
His poetry appears in three textbook anthologies and approximately 200 literary journals, both in print and online. His ten-minute plays (or flash drama) and comedy skits have been performed onstage at the Shelterbelt Theatre in Omaha, NE, and in theatres in Dover, NJ, and New York City.

Dickey has published fiction (including flash fiction), short plays, creative nonfiction, and poetry in multiple genres, including prose poetry, formal verse—both serious and comic, and free verse. Of their publications for the year 2011, Mayapple Press selected Dickey's first book They Say This is How Death Came Into the World to be nominated for the National Book Award in Poetry. Dickey won the 2015 Master Poet Award from the Nebraska Arts Council.

Michel Delville, the author of a major critical work on prose poetry, The American Prose Poem: Poetic Form and the Boundaries of Genre (University Press of Florida, 1998), said of Dickey: "Whether it’s a poem about (or around) Mark Rothko’s painting Yellow Band or a prose poem about 'Mowing the Lawn' that pauses with Husserl’s phenomenology, Dickey’s poetry is grounded in a recognition that, to quote Sherwood Anderson, 'each truth [is] a composite of a great many vague thoughts,' all equally beautiful and disturbing, somber and happy." Prose poet Nin Andrews (author of twelve poetry collections) writes of Dickey's They Say This Is How Death Came into the World that it is "seductively inventive, charmingly clever and seriously witty. The pleasures offered by Paul Dickey’s quirky and irreverent meditations are utterly irresistible."

Dickey has a Master of Art’s degree from Indiana University Bloomington, in the History and Philosophy of Science. In the 1970s, while a graduate student at Wichita State University, he published poetry in The Kansas Quarterly, Quartet, and Nimrod. At Wichita State, he was a student of the American-Filipino poet, novelist, and short story author Bienvenido Santos. Dickey currently teaches philosophy in Omaha, Nebraska at Metropolitan Community College (Nebraska).

== Works ==
=== Books (Bibliographies) ===
- Bienvenido N. Santos: An Illustrated Bibliography (Dickey Books, 2023) ISBN 979-8-89292-865-6
- Wallace Stevens - An Illustrated Bibliography: The Early Years (Dickey Books, 2023) ISBN 979-8-88896-568-9
- John Berryman: A Book Collection (Dickey Books, 2023) ISBN 979-8-89292-866-3

=== Books (Poetry) ===
- What Wisconsin Took (Parallel Press, 2006)
- They Say This is How Death Came Into the World (Mayapple Press, 2011)
- Liberal Limericks of 2012 (The Missouri River Review Press, 2012) (e-book). Illustrated by Ira Joel Haber. ASIN: B008MP9POM
- Wires Over the Homeplace (Pinyon Publishing, 2013)
- Anti-Realism in Shadows at Suppertime (Dickey Books, 2022) ISBN 979-8-88796-402-7
- A Reading of Dali (Likely Misunderstood) Which a Twenty Meters Becomes the Poet's Self-portrait (Dickey Books, 2022)
- The Liberal Limericks - Collected Verse (Dickey Books, 2022)
- Horrifying Rhymes Decoded . 2026 forthcoming
- Belladona Lily, & Some Poems Make No SENSE . 2026 forthcoming

=== Books (Flash Fiction) ===
- What My Characters Should Have Said (Dickey Books, 2022) ISBN 979-8-88831-222-3

=== Books (Drama) ===
- The Good News According to St Dude and Other Plays (Dickey Books, 2022)
- Don and Dawn Have Secrets (Dickey Books, 2022) ISBN 979-8-88896-564-1
- The Collected Short Plays - Volume 1 (2024)
- The Collected Short Plays - Volume II (2024)

=== Anthologies ===
- "Constellation" in Kosmicki, Greg & Mary K Stillwell (Editors), Nebraska Presence: An Anthology of Poetry, (Omaha, NE: The Backwaters Press, 2007.) ISBN 978-0979393433
- "When It All Comes Down to the Last Resort" in Clements, Brian & Jamey Dunham (Editors), An Introduction to the Prose Poem, Firewheel Editions, 2010. ISBN 978-0966575477
- "The Widow's Lamentation" in Lechliter, Gary J. (Editor), The Shining Years: Poems About Aging, Blue Wild Indigo Productions, 2021. ISBN 978-1792356001

=== Journals -- Poetry, Fiction, Drama, and Creative Nonfiction ===
32 Poems, Another Chicago Review, Anti-, Apple Valley Review, Bellevue Literary Review, Cider Press Review, Chiron Review, Concho River Review, Crab Orchard Review, Cue: A Journal of Prose Poetry, diode, failbetter, The Freeman, Jelly Bucket, Laurel Review, Light (journal), I-70 Review, Linebreak, Memoir (and), Mid-American Review, The Midwest Quarterly, Nimrod, Pinyon Review, Pleiades (journal), Plume, Poet Lore, Potomac Review, Prairie Schooner, Quadrant, Rattle, Sentence, South Florida Poetry Review, and Southern Poetry Review."
