= Limerick (song) =

Drinking song

"Limerick" is a traditional humorous drinking song with many obscene verses. The tune usually used for sung limericks is traditionally "Cielito Lindo", with the words arranged in the form of a limerick.

== Recorded versions ==
- The Limerick Song has been commercially recorded many times. The earliest version of limericks being sung is 1905 under the title Fol-The-Rol-Lol as sung by Edward M. Favor on an Edison record. The earliest date for limericks being sung to the "Gay Caballero" tune is May 11, 1931 on the recording titled Rhymes sung by Jack Hylton which was issued on Decca records. Beginning in the 1980s Australian stand-up comedian Rodney Rude would sing extremely crude limericks.

== Printed versions ==
The earliest printed date for limericks being sung is 1928 in the book A Collection of Sea Songs and Ditties from the Stores of Tom E. Jones. Since many of the verses used for this song are bawdy the song tended to get issued in rare, underground mimeographed songbooks. Some of these are (in chronological order):

- 1934. Leech.

== Variant choruses ==
There are several different choruses for this song. One of the most popular in the United States of America is sung to the tune of the traditional Mexican song, "Cielito Lindo" and usually goes like this:

I-Yi-Yi-Yi,
In China, they never eat chili
So here comes another verse worse than the other verse
So waltz me around again, Willie.

Or, alternatively:

I-Yi-Yi-Yi,
In China, they do it for chili
So let's get a verse that's worse than the other verse
And waltz me around by my willie.

Sometimes, the second line of the chorus is varied from chorus to chorus, while the rest remains the same. When the song is sung in a group, the line may be left open for someone to shout a joke line, then the group finishes the chorus together.

I-Yi-Yi-Yi,
My sister's in love with a carrot...

Another chorus, to an unknown tune, is also not uncommon in the UK:

That was a cute little rhyme
Sing us another one, do--oo--

A less commonly reported chorus goes:

Sweet Violets, sweeter than all the roses,
Covered all over from head to toe,
Covered all over with [shit]

In the children's rendition of this song, the chorus goes:

Ay-yi-yi-yi,
In China they never grow chili (chilly)
So sing one more verse
that's worse than the first
Be sure that it's foolish and silly.

== Lyrics ==
The lyrics for the Limerick Song are usually ribald and sometimes original. Here are some from the public domain book Sea Songs and Ditties:

There was a young lady named Lou
who said as the parson withdrew--
"Now the Vicar is quicker,
And thicker, and slicker,
And two inches longer than you.

Chorus:

That was a cute little rhyme
Sing us another one, do--oo--

chorus

Here's to old king Montezuma
For fun he buggered a puma
The puma one day
Bit both balls away
An example of animal humor.

There is a version of this song which is rendered for children. Three verses are as follows:

A canner exceedingly canny
One morning remarked to his granny
A canner can can
Anything that he can
But a canner can't can a can, can he?

A tutor who tooted the flute
Tried to tutor two Tudors to toot
Said the two to the tutor
Is it tougher to toot, or
To tutor two Tudors to toot?

(in order for line c to rhyme with line d, "to toot, or" is said quickly in order to sound like "to tutor")

A flea and a fly in a flue,
Were stuck there, so what could they do?
Said the fly, "Let us flee!",
Said the flea, "Let us fly!",
So they flew through a flaw in the flue.
