= William Rossa Cole =

American anthologist (1919–2000)

- Born: November 20, 1919; Staten Island, New York
- Died: August 2, 2000 (aged 80); New York City
- Occupations: Writer; poet; anthologist; editor
- Writing career
- Genres: light verse, children's literature, anthology
- Notable works: I Went to the Animal Fair: A Book of Animal Poems, Beastly Boys and Ghastly Girls: Poems, The Birds and Beasts Were There: Animal Poems

William Rossa Cole (November 20, 1919 – August 2, 2000) was an American editor, anthologist, columnist, author, and writer of light verse. He produced around 75 books, most of them anthologies.

Cole was born William Harrison Cole on November 20, 1919, to William Harrison Cole and Margaret O'Donovan-Rossa of Staten Island, New York. He was the brother of Rossa Cole. His grandfather was the Irish Fenian leader Jeremiah O'Donovan Rossa.

Cole worked in a deli and a bookstore in the 1930s. After military service in the infantry in World War II from 1940 to 1945 (during which he earned a Purple Heart), he took various jobs in the publishing industry, serving as publicity director at Alfred A. Knopf from 1946 to 1958, publicity director and editor at Simon & Schuster from 1958 to 1961, and, with Viking Press, co-publisher of William Cole Books.

He was also a prolific writer and anthologist, editing and writing over 75 books. Many of his books were honored by the American Library Association, including I Went to the Animal Fair: A Book of Animal Poems (named a notable book of 1958, and on the List of Notable Children's Books of 1940–1959), Beastly Boys and Ghastly Girls: Poems (named a notable book of 1964), and The Birds and Beasts Were There: Animal Poems (honored in 1965).

Cole's whimsical poetry often appeared in Light Quarterly and was widely anthologized, as in The Oxford Book of American Light Verse and various collections by Willard R. Espy.

Reviewing eleven collections of poetry for children, Selden Rodman (aided by his own three children) found Cole's Oh, How Silly! and Jack Prelutsky's Toucans Two the only two among them that were "literate and consistently readable". The former was a "really masterful collaboration" by Cole and its illustrator, Tomi Ungerer.

Cole wrote the regular column "Trade Winds" in Saturday Review from 1974 to 1979; a book review column for Endless Vacation, from around 1990 to 2000; and contributed to Atlantic Monthly, Harper's, The New York Times Book Review, and The New Yorker.

Cole died in his Manhattan home, aged 80, on August 2, 2000. (Note: Some sources say Thursday August 3: as examples, the Milwaukee Journal Sentinel and the Associated Press (via Newsday). However, both his obituary and a paid death notice in the New York Times say Wednesday August 2. "William Rossa Cole", Milwaukee Journal Sentinel, August 9, 2000; "William Rossa Cole, 80, Children's Book Writer, Editor", Newsday, August 9, 2000; Eric Pace, "William Rossa Cole, 80, Author and Editor of Children's Books", The New York Times, August 8, 2000; "Cole, William" [paid death notice], The New York Times, August 8, 2000) He was memorialized in a poem by Seamus Heaney, winner of the Nobel Prize in Literature.

Cole was married twice: to Peggy Bennett in 1947 and to Galen Williams in 1967. Both marriages ended in divorce. He was survived by two daughters and two sons.

== Bibliography ==
Second and later editions are listed only if retitled.

- William Cole, ed. The Fireside Book of Humorous Poetry. New York: Simon & Schuster, 1950. OCLC 11859285.
- Marvin Rosenberg and William Cole, eds. The Best Cartoons from "Punch": Collected for Americans from England's Famous Humorous Weekly. New York: Simon & Schuster, 1952. OCLC 988110372.
- William Cole and Bruce Rogers, eds. The Best Humor from "Punch", illustrated by Sprod. Cleveland: World Publishing, 1953. OCLC 1147729974. (British edition: The Best Humour from "Punch".)
- Marvin Rosenberg and William Cole, eds. America Laughs at "Punch": Collected by Americans – for Americans from England's Famous Humorous Weekly. London: Thames & Hudson, 1953. OCLC 6888850.
- William Cole and Douglas McKee, eds. French Cartoons: Riotous, Ribald, and Racy. New York: Dell, 1955. OCLC 1114266000.
- William Cole, ed. Humorous Poetry for Children, illustrated by Ervine Metzl. Cleveland, Ohio: World Publishing, 1955. OCLC 987966311.
- William Cole and Douglas McKee, eds. More French Cartoons. New York: Dell, 1955. OCLC 7155485.
- William Cole and Florett Robinson, eds. Women Are Wonderful! A History in Cartoons of a Hundred Years with America's Most Controversial Figure. Boston: Houghton Mifflin, 1956. OCLC 1065263.
- William Cole, ed. Story Poems, New and Old, illustrated by Walter Buehr. Cleveland, Ohio: World Publishing, 1957. OCLC 1153616109.
- William Cole, ed. I Went to the Animal Fair: A Book of Animal Poems, illustrated by Colette Rosselli. Cleveland, Ohio: World Publishing, 1958. OCLC 563895.
- William Cole, ed. Poems of Magic and Spells, illustrated by Peggy Bacon. Cleveland, Ohio: World Publishing, 1960. OCLC 1295313.
- William Cole and Julia Colmore, eds. The Poetry-Drawing Book. New York: Simon & Schuster, 1960. OCLC 11111884.
- William Cole, ed. Folk Songs of England, Ireland, Scotland, and Wales, arranged by Norman Monath and illustrated by Edward Ardizzone. Garden City, New York: Doubleday, 1961. OCLC 30996984.
- William Cole and Julia Colmore, eds. New York in Photographs. New York: Simon & Schuster, 1961. OCLC 2639394.
- William Cole, ed. Poems for Seasons and Celebrations, illustrated by Johannes Troyer. Cleveland, Ohio: World Publishing, 1961. OCLC 1256533707.
- William Cole and Douglas McKee, eds. Touché: French Cartoons. New York: Dell, 1961. OCLC 12157175.
- William Cole and Julia Colmore, eds. The Second Poetry-Drawing Book. New York: Simon & Schuster, 1962. OCLC 9051619.
- William Cole and Douglas McKee, eds. You Damn Men Are All Alike: French Cartoons. Greenwich, Connecticut: Fawcett, 1962. OCLC 14814968.
- William Cole, ed. The Birds and the Beasts Were There: Animal Poems, illustrated by Helen Siegl. Cleveland, Ohio: World Publishing, 1963. OCLC 497167.
- William Cole, ed. A Cat-Hater's Handbook; or, The Ailurophobe's Delight, illustrated by Tomi Ungerer. Dial, 1963. OCLC 1155514346. London: W.H. Allen, 1963. OCLC 946505631.
- William Cole, ed. Erotic Poetry: The Lyrics, Ballads, Idyls, and Epics of Love, Classical to Contemporary, illustrated by Warren Chappell. Foreword by Stephen Spender. New York: Random House, 1963. OCLC 335619.
- William Cole. Frances Face-Maker: A Going-to-Bed Book, illustrated by Tomi Ungerer, World Publishing, 1963. OCLC 304631.
- William Cole, ed. The Most of A. J. Liebling. New York: Simon & Schuster, 1963. OCLC 237051.
- William Cole, ed. Beastly Boys and Ghastly Girls, illustrated by Tomi Ungerer. Cleveland, Ohio: World Publishing, 1964. OCLC 249187447.
- William Cole, ed. A Big Bowl of "Punch": A Heady Potpourri of Cartoons, Prose, and Verse from England's Famous Humorous Weekly. New York: Simon & Schuster, 1964. OCLC 1147725811.
- William Cole, ed. A Book of Love Poems, illustrated by Lars Bo. Viking, 1965. OCLC 517874.
- William Cole. What's Good for a Six-Year-Old?, illustrated by Ingrid Fetz. Holt, Rinehart and Winston, 1965. OCLC 857033.
- William Cole, ed. Oh, What Nonsense!, illustrated by Tomi Ungerer. New York: Viking, 1966. OCLC 304633.
- William Cole. Uncoupled Couplets: A Game of Rhymes. New York: Taplinger, 1966. OCLC 901987.
- William Cole and Mike Thaler, eds. The Classic Cartoons. Cleveland, Ohio: World Publishing, 1966. OCLC 767556876.
- William Cole. What's Good for a Four-Year-Old?, illustrated by Tomi Ungerer. Holt, Rinehart and Winston, 1967. OCLC 660849.
- William Cole, ed. Limerick Giggles, Joke Giggles, illustrated by Tomi Ungerer. Cleveland, Ohio: World Publishing, 1967. OCLC 8813910. (A Case of the Giggles, vol. 1.)
- William Cole, ed. Rhyme Giggles, Nonsense Giggles, illustrated by Tomi Ungerer. Cleveland, Ohio: World Publishing, 1967. OCLC 656841278. (A Case of the Giggles, vol. 2.)
- William Cole, ed. Eight Lines and Under: An Anthology of Short, Short Poems. New York: Macmillan, 1967. OCLC 817202.
- William Cole, ed. W. S. Gilbert, Poems, illustrated by W. S. Gilbert. New York: Crowell, 1967. OCLC 1294310.
- William Cole, ed. Poems Selected for Young People, by D. H. Lawrence, illustrated by Ellen Raskin. New York: Viking, 1967. OCLC 1296975818.
- William Cole, ed. Man's Funniest Friend: The Dog in Stories, Reminiscences, Poems and Cartoons. Cleveland, Ohio: World Publishing, 1967. OCLC 712502.
- William Cole, ed. The Sea, Ships, and Sailors: Poems, Songs, and Shanties, illustrated by Robin Jacques. New York: Viking, 1967. OCLC 855283.
- William Cole, ed. Poems of Thomas Hood, illustrated by Sam Fischer. New York: Crowell, 1968. OCLC 1161265.
- William Cole, ed. A Book of Nature Poems, illustrated by Robert Andrew Parker. New York: Viking, 1969. ISBN 0670180076.
- William Cole, ed. Pith and Vinegar: An Anthology of Short Humorous Poetry. New York: Simon & Schuster, 1969. ISBN 0671203622.
- William Cole, ed. The Punch Line: Presenting Today's Top Twenty-five Cartoon Artists from England's Famous Humor Magazine. New York: Simon & Schuster, 1969. ISBN 0671203738.
- William Cole, ed. Rough Men, Tough Men: Poems of Action and Adventure, illustrated by Enrico Arno. New York: Viking, 1969. ISBN 0670608637.
- William Cole, ed. What's Good for a Five-Year-Old?, illustrated by Edward Sorel. New York: Holt, Rinehart & Winston, 1969. OCLC 1412.
- William Cole. Aunt Bella's Umbrella, illustrated by Jacqueline Chwast. New York: Doubleday, 1970. OCLC 735665.
- William Cole, ed. The Book of Giggles, illustrated by Tomi Ungerer. New York: World Publishing, 1970. OCLC 112541.
- William Cole, ed. Oh, How Silly! Poems, illustrated by Tomi Ungerer. New York: Viking, 1970. ISBN 0670520950.
- William Cole. That Pest, Jonathan, illustrated by Tomi Ungerer. New York: Harper & Row, 1970. OCLC 71089.
- William Cole, ed. The Poet's Tales: A New Book of Story Poems, illustrated by Charles Keeping. New York: World Publishing, 1971. OCLC 226518.
- William Cole, ed. Poetry Brief: An Anthology of Short, Short Poems. New York: Macmillan, 1971. OCLC 156489.
- William Cole, ed. ... And Be Merry! A Feast of Light Verse and a Soupçon of Prose about the Joy of Eating. New York: Grossman, 1972. ISBN 0670122807.
- William Cole, ed. Oh, That's Ridiculous! Poems, illustrated by Tomi Ungerer. New York: Viking, 1972. ISBN 0670521078.
- William Cole, ed. Pick Me Up: A Book of Short, Short Poems. New York: Macmillan, 1972. OCLC 293196.
- William Cole, ed. Poems from Ireland, illustrated by William Stobbs. New York: Crowell, 1972. ISBN 0690638981.
- William Cole, ed. A Book of Animal Poems, illustrated by Robert Andrew Parker. New York: Viking, 1973. ISBN 0670179078.
- William Cole, ed. Half Serious: An Anthology of Short, Short Poems. London: Eyre Methuen, 1973. ISBN 0413296709.
- William Cole, ed. Poems: One Line and Longer. New York: Grossman, 1973. ISBN 0670562386.
- William Cole. What's Good for a Three-Year-Old?, illustrated by Lillian Hoban. New York: Holt, Rinehart and Winston, 1974. ISBN 003007441X.
- William Cole. Knock Knocks: The Most Ever, illustrated by Mike Thaler. New York: F. Watts, 1976. ISBN 0531024288, ISBN 0531011429.
- William Cole. The Square Bear and Other Riddle Rhymers. New York: Scholastic, 1976. OCLC 5242137.
- William Cole, ed. A Boy Named Mary Jane, and Other Silly Verse, illustrated by George MacClain. New York: F. Watts, 1977. ISBN 0531011445, ISBN 0531003949.
- William Cole. Knock Knocks You've Never Heard Before, illustrated by Mike Thaler, New York: F. Watts, 1977. ISBN 053100385X.
- William Cole, ed. An Arkful of Animals, illustrated by Lynn Munsinger. Boston: Houghton Mifflin, 1978. ISBN 039527205X, ISBN 0395616182.
- William Cole. Give Up? Cartoon Riddle Rhymers, illustrated by Mike Thaler, New York: F. Watts, 1978. ISBN 0531022498.
- William Cole, ed. I'm Mad at You!, illustrated by George MacClain. New York: Collins, 1978. ISBN 0529053632, ISBN 0001955349.
- William Cole, ed. Oh, Such Foolishness!, illustrated by Tomie dePaola, Philadelphia: Lippincott, 1978. ISBN 0397318073.
- William Cole, ed. Backwords, illustrated by Mike Thaler. New York: Random House, 1980. ISBN 0394620402.
- William Cole. Dinosaurs and Beasts of Yore: Poems, illustrated by Susanna Natti. Cleveland, Ohio: Collins, 1979. ISBN 0529055112, ISBN 0001955357.
- William Cole, ed. The Poetry of Horses, illustrated by Ruth Sanderson. New York: Scribner, 1979. ISBN 0684163306.
- William Cole, ed. Good Dog Poems, illustrated by Ruth Sanderson. New York: Scribner, 1981. ISBN 0684167093.
- William Cole, ed. New Knock Knocks, illustrated by Mike Thaler. London: Granada, 1981. ISBN 0583304915.
- William Cole, ed. Poem Stew, illustrated by Karen Ann Weinhaus. New York: Lippincott, 1981. ISBN 0397319630, ISBN 0397319649, ISBN 0064401367, ISBN 0808531999.
- William Cole, ed. Monster Knock Knocks, illustrated by Mike Thaler. Pocket Books, 1982. ISBN 0671442546, ISBN 0671508105, ISBN 0671633961, ISBN 0671706535.
- William Cole and Louis Phillips, eds. Sex: "The Most Fun You Can Have without Laughing" ... and Other Quotations. New York: St. Martin's, 1990. ISBN 0312051522.
- William Cole, ed. A Zooful of Animals, illustrated by Lynn Munsinger. Boston: Houghton Mifflin, 1992. ISBN 0395522781, ISBN 0395778735.
- William Cole, ed. Bah Humbug!: Grumping through the Season. New York: St. Martin's, 1992. ISBN 0312082797.
- William Cole and Louis Phillips, eds. Oh, What an Awful Thing to Say!: Needles, Skewers, Pricks, and Outright Nastiness. New York: St. Martin's, 1992. ISBN 0312070489.
- William Cole and Louis Phillips, eds. The Bedside Book of Insults. London: John Murray, 1992. ISBN 0719551536. (British edition of Oh, What an Awful Thing to Say!)
- William Cole, ed. New York: A Literary Companion. Wainscott, New York: Pushcart, 1992. ISBN 0916366596.
- William Cole, ed. Have I Got Dogs!, illustrated by Margot Apple. New York: Viking, 1993. ISBN 0670830704.
