= Georgie Starbuck Galbraith =

American poet (1909–1980)

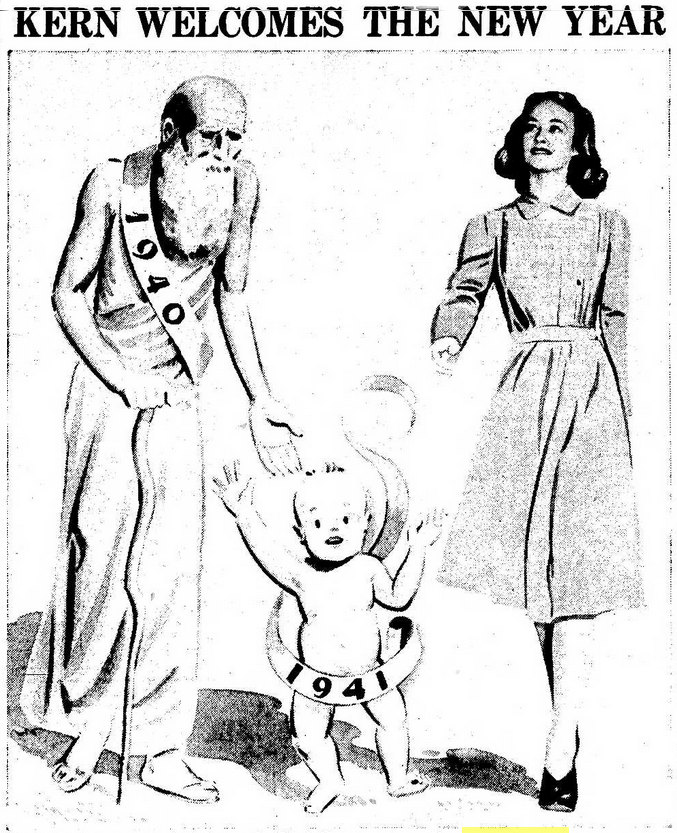
Within a 1 January 1941 illustration of "past" encouraging "future", The Bakersfield Californian chose Galbraith to personify the Kern county of the day. (Note: The original caption: "Symbolizing Kern county, standing on the threshold of a new year, Mrs. Georgie Galbraith (present) walks forward with the newborn 1941 (future), as enfeebled 1940 (past) gives new year an encouraging pat on back." The Bakersfield Californian, 1 January 1941, p. 33.)

Georgie Starbuck Galbraith (1909–1980) was a prolific writer of light verse, and briefly a writer of song lyrics, who lived in Bakersfield, California.

== Life ==
Georgie Starbuck Galbraith was born on 15 December 1909 in Brownington, Missouri. Her parents were Harry and Eathel (née Munson) Starbuck. The family moved to California when Georgie was three months old, and in 1916 moved within California from Goshen to Bakersfield, where she remained. She attended Washington Grammar School, Kern County High School, and, for two years, Bakersfield College.

The teenage Starbuck acted in a number of plays. A newspaper review of a performance for 2,000 of The Biblical Story of Esther, said that Georgia Starbuck, (Note: In Bakersfield newspapers of the 1920s, there are references to both "Georgia Starbuck" and "Georgie Starbuck" in dramatic productions. Presumably they refer to a single person.) playing Haman's wife, "proved an actress of charm, giving her highly dramatic moments an expression of reality where the slightest amateur touch would have changed the intense to the theatric". She played the title role in a school production of the play The Brat. While at Bakersfield College, she acted in Treasure Island and Little Old New York. (Note: Bakersfield Morning Echo credits not Georgie but Georgia Starbuck. However, the miniature description of Georgie Starbuck Galbraith within Roxanne Starbuck, "Impressive accomplishments", The Bakersfield College Archives Newsletter, Fall 2017. pp. 6–7, credits her with these performances.)

Georgie Starbuck married Howard John (Jack) Galbraith, who was captured at Bataan and taken by the ship Ōryoku Maru to Olongapo (where it was bombed and sunk) and by other ships to Moji, but who survived the ordeal and was repatriated. The couple were later divorced. (Note: In 1963, Georgie Starbuck Galbraith described herself as living "alone in an amiable clutter of books, manuscripts, pictures and junk". Virginia Scott Miner, "It fits the season with a merry mood", The Kansas City Times, 18 December 1963, p. 32. Here at Newspapers.com.)

Galbraith died on 25 February 1980, in Bakersfield, California.

== Career ==
Galbraith started writing in 1938; and after three years, started submitting her work for publication.

Galbraith was described as "one of the few poets who could make a living at her craft [which she managed] by writing under more than 125 pseudonyms". These included Anne Patrice, Tracy Ellington, Penny Pennington, and Stuart Pennington.

Magazines she contributed to (as Georgie Starbuck Galbraith) include Adam; The American Legion Magazine; Atlantic Monthly, 1946–1961; Better Homes and Gardens, 1947–1958; College Humor; Good Housekeeping, 1943–1960; Judge; Knight; Ladies' Home Journal; Look; McCall's, 1960–1973; Reader's Digest, 1951–1956; The Saturday Evening Post, 1943–1961; Saturday Review, 1946–1955; and Woman's Home Companion; as well as occasionally to Cosmopolitan, Country Gentleman, Harper's Magazine and Prairie Schooner.

One volume of Galbraith's verse was published: Have One on Me (1963). (Note: Philadelphia: Lippincott, 1963. With drawings by Vahan Shirvanian. OCLC 1396188.) The reviewer for The Kansas City Times recommended it as a surprise Christmas present; the reviewer for the Fort Lauderdale News as "great guest room reading"; and that for The Buffalo News as "a volume of pure pleasure". It got a lukewarm review from Kirkus Reviews:

Mrs. Galbraith takes a good-natured cardboard sword to urban and suburban life. [. . . This is a] cheerful melange, whose mark is middling, and definitely not for the McGinley set.

Identifying "the battle of the sexes" as "that richest of mother lodes for the light verse writer out prospecting for subject matter", the poet Richard Armour named Galbraith as one of the women – together with Dorothy Parker, Phyllis McGinley, Margaret Fishback, and Ethel Jacobson – who had "done even better" at this than had the men.

Galbraith also wrote song lyrics, from 1954 to 1955 working with the composer Ralph Yaw.
