= Alma Denny =

American poet and columnist

Alma Denenholz Kaplan
- Born: 1906; Far Rockaway, Queens
- Died: March 1, 2003 (aged 96); Manhattan
- Occupations: Poet, columnist
- Writing career
- Pen name: Alma Denny
- Genres: Light verse, advice column

Alma Denenholz Kaplan (1906 – 1 March 2003) was an American poet and syndicated columnist who wrote under the pseudonym Alma Denny.

== Life and career ==
Denny was born Alma Denenholz in Far Rockaway in New York City, the eldest of ten children. She received degrees from Hunter College and Teachers College, Columbia University and married a doctor, Theodore Kaplan, with whom she had two children.

Though her husband was adamant that she not work, Denny pursued a career as a freelance writer. Her light verse and vignettes appeared in Good Housekeeping, The New Yorker, Light Quarterly, The New York Times, Reader's Digest, English Today, Playboy, The Wall Street Journal, The Lyric, and other popular magazines. Her poetry was widely anthologized, appearing in The Random House Treasury of Light Verse and other collections, and she was the featured poet in the Winter 1998 issue of Light Quarterly. Her first book of poetry, Blinkies: Funny Poems to Read in a Blink, was published in 1991 and was reviewed favourably by columnist Richard Lederer.

Denny was also a syndicated columnist, penning the weekly advice column "Family Council" which appeared in 40 newspapers in the 1960s. She was later a frequent contributor to The New York Times.

Denny died in her Manhattan home in March 2003, aged 96.

Denny's great-niece is the writer Dawn Eden Goldstein.

== Bibliography ==
=== Books ===
- Blinkies: Funny Poems to Read in a Blink by Alma Denny (Lamb & Lion Studio, 1991, ISBN 978-1879865013)

=== In anthologies ===
- The Random House Treasury of Light Verse by Louis Phillips, editor
- Light Year '87 by Robert Wallace, editor (Bits Press, 1986, ISBN 978-0933248076)
