= Light poetry =

Poetry that attempts to be humorous

Light poetry or light verse is poetry that attempts to be humorous. Light poems are usually brief, can be on a frivolous or serious subject, and often feature word play including puns, adventurous rhyme, and heavy alliteration. Nonsense poetry is often considered light verse, as well as some poems that employ parody or satire. Typically, light verse in English is formal verse, although a few free verse poets have excelled at light verse outside the formal verse tradition.

While light poetry is sometimes condemned as doggerel or thought of as poetry composed casually, humor often makes a serious point in a subtle or subversive way. Many of the most renowned "serious" poets, such as Horace, Swift, Pope, and Auden, also excelled at light verse.

== History ==
=== 19th Century ===
Lord Byron's poem Beppo is an early and notable instance of light poetry in the 19th century, though other writers like Winthrop Mackworth Praed, Frederick Locker-Lampson, C. S. Calverley, and Austin Dobson were also influential in the Regency and Victorian eras of the genre. The limerick is perhaps the most recognizable form of comic or light poetry, with Edward Lear's The Book of Nonsense being a popular and influential example.

== Notable poets ==
=== English ===
- Richard Armour
- Max Beerbohm
- Hilaire Belloc
- John Betjeman
- Morris Bishop
- Lord Byron
- C. S. Calverley
- Lewis Carroll
- Charles E. Carryl
- Brian P. Cleary
- William Rossa Cole
- Wendy Cope
- Noël Coward
- Alma Denny
- Henry Austin Dobson
- T. S. Eliot
- Willard R. Espy
- Gavin Ewart
- Margaret Fishback
- Georgie Starbuck Galbraith
- Charles Ghigna
- W. S. Gilbert
- Arthur Guiterman
- A. P. Herbert
- Oliver Herford
- Samuel Hoffenstein
- Thomas Hood
- Frank Jacobs
- Ethel Jacobson
- X. J. Kennedy
- Joyce La Mers
- Edward Lear
- Dennis Lee
- Newman Levy
- J. Patrick Lewis
- J. A. Lindon
- Don Marquis
- David McCord
- Phyllis McGinley
- David Morice
- Vladimir Nabokov
- Ogden Nash
- Dorothy Parker
- Alexander Pope
- Maurice Sagoff
- Shel Silverstein
- James Kenneth Stephen
- Jonathan Swift
- John Updike
- John Whitworth
- John Wilmot
- Dr Seuss

=== German ===
- Wilhelm Busch
- Heinz Erhardt
- Robert Gernhardt
- Christian Morgenstern
- Joachim Ringelnatz
- Erich Kästner
- Eugen Roth
- Mascha Kaléko

=== Dutch ===
- Drs. P
- Kees Stip

== Publications ==
- Seaver, Robert (1908), Ye butcher, ye baker, ye candlestick-maker Houghton Mifflin Company. Being sundry amusing and instructive verses for both old and young, adorned with numerous woodcuts
- Auden, W. H. (originally published in 1938), The Oxford Book of Light Verse, a seminal light verse anthology. Part of the Oxford Books of Verse series.

The following periodicals regularly publish light verse:

- Able Muse
- Light (formerly Light Quarterly), a journal of light verse
- The Spectator runs regular light verse competitions
- The Washington Post runs regular light verse competitions as part of its Style Invitational

== See also ==
- Alla barnen
- Clerihew
- Double dactyl
- Epigram
- Limerick
- McWhirtle
- Michael Braude Award for Light Verse
- Nonsense verse
