= Maurice Sagoff =

American poet

- Born: 1909 or 1910; Cambridge, Massachusetts
- Died: March 18, 1998; Acton, Massachusetts
- Occupations: Journalist, poet
- Writing career
- Genre: light verse
- Notable work: ShrinkLits: 70 of the World's Towering Classics Cut Down to Size

Maurice Sagoff (1909 or 1910 – March 18, 1998) was an American poet best remembered for ShrinkLits, his bestselling collection of light verse.

Sagoff was born in Cambridge, Massachusetts. After graduating from Boston College he worked for one decade as a research librarian at the Boston Public Library and for two decades at Fairchild Publications as a regional editor. After his retirement in 1954 he wrote ShrinkLits: 70 of the World's Towering Classics Cut Down to Size, a collection of literary classics condensed into terse light poetry. The book, published by Doubleday in 1970, became a New York Times bestseller. He subsequently published his poetry in a number of publications, including The New York Times and Mademoiselle. Though ShrinkLits was his only published book, shortly before his death in 1998 he had completed a new manuscript for a collection of clerihews.
