= Edward Dowling (priest) =

American Jesuit priest

The Rev. Edward Dowling SJ
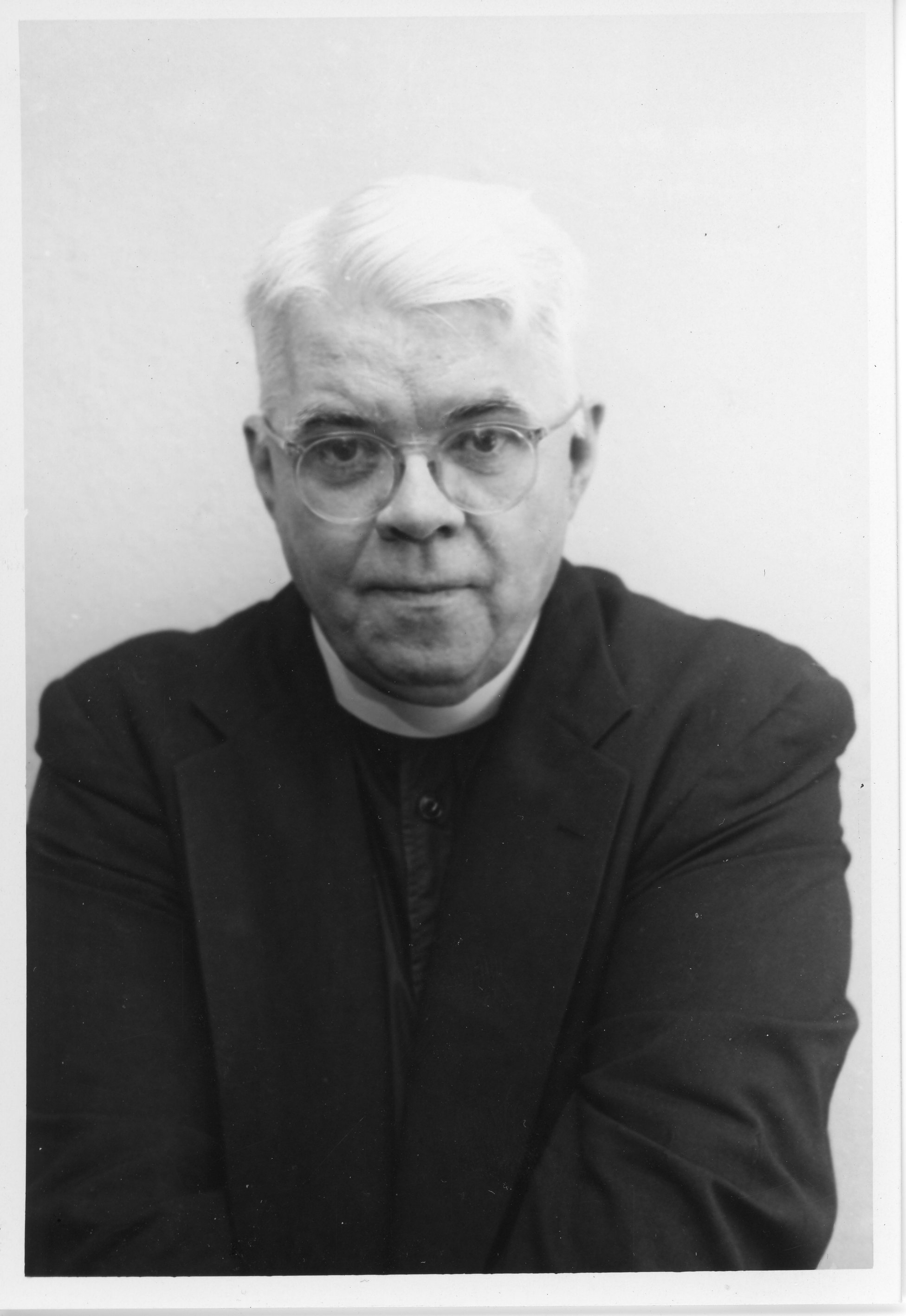
- Born: September 1, 1898; St. Louis, Missouri
- Died: April 3, 1960 (aged 61); Memphis, Tennessee
- Resting place: St. Louis, Missouri
- Occupation: Jesuit priest
- Known for: spiritual advisor of Bill W. and sponsor of Alcoholics Anonymous

Edward Dowling (1898–1960), also known as Father Ed, was a Jesuit priest and spiritual advisor to Bill W., co-founder of Alcoholics Anonymous.

== Biography ==
Dowling was the oldest of five children in an Irish Catholic family in St. Louis. His paternal grandfather emigrated from Ireland in the mid-1800s and opened a railroad construction company, which his father also managed. Both his father and mother, Anastasia Cullinane, were observant Catholics. Dowling was a student at Holy Name School before attending St. Louis University High School. He attended St. Mary's College in Kansas, and played baseball semi-professionally as well as in school. He tried out for both the St. Louis Browns and the Boston Red Sox, but neither hired him. Dowling initially studied journalism; he reported for the St. Louis Globe-Democrat for a year before joining the U.S. Army in World War I. He studied for a year at Medill School of Journalism at Northwest University.

In 1919, Dowling entered St. Stanislaus Seminary. He struggled with his spirituality, and left the seminary to study philosophy in St. Louis. After three years, Dowling went to Chicago to teach at Loyola Academy. He then returned to St. Mary's College to study theology for three years, and was ordained in 1931; he was assigned to the Sodality of Our Lady the following year, and took his final vows as a Jesuit in 1936. While there, Dowling served as the editor of the sodality's magazine, The Queen's Work. He held this position and lived in the society until his death in 1960.

Dowling also had training as a genealogist, and was an advocate of civil rights. In 1957, the 100th anniversary of the Dred Scott court case, Dowling led an effort to locate Scott's previously unmarked grave. Dowling raised funds for a modest headstone, saying, "[I]f someone some day wants to put up a better monument it will at least be known where Dred Scott lies."

== Alcoholics Anonymous ==
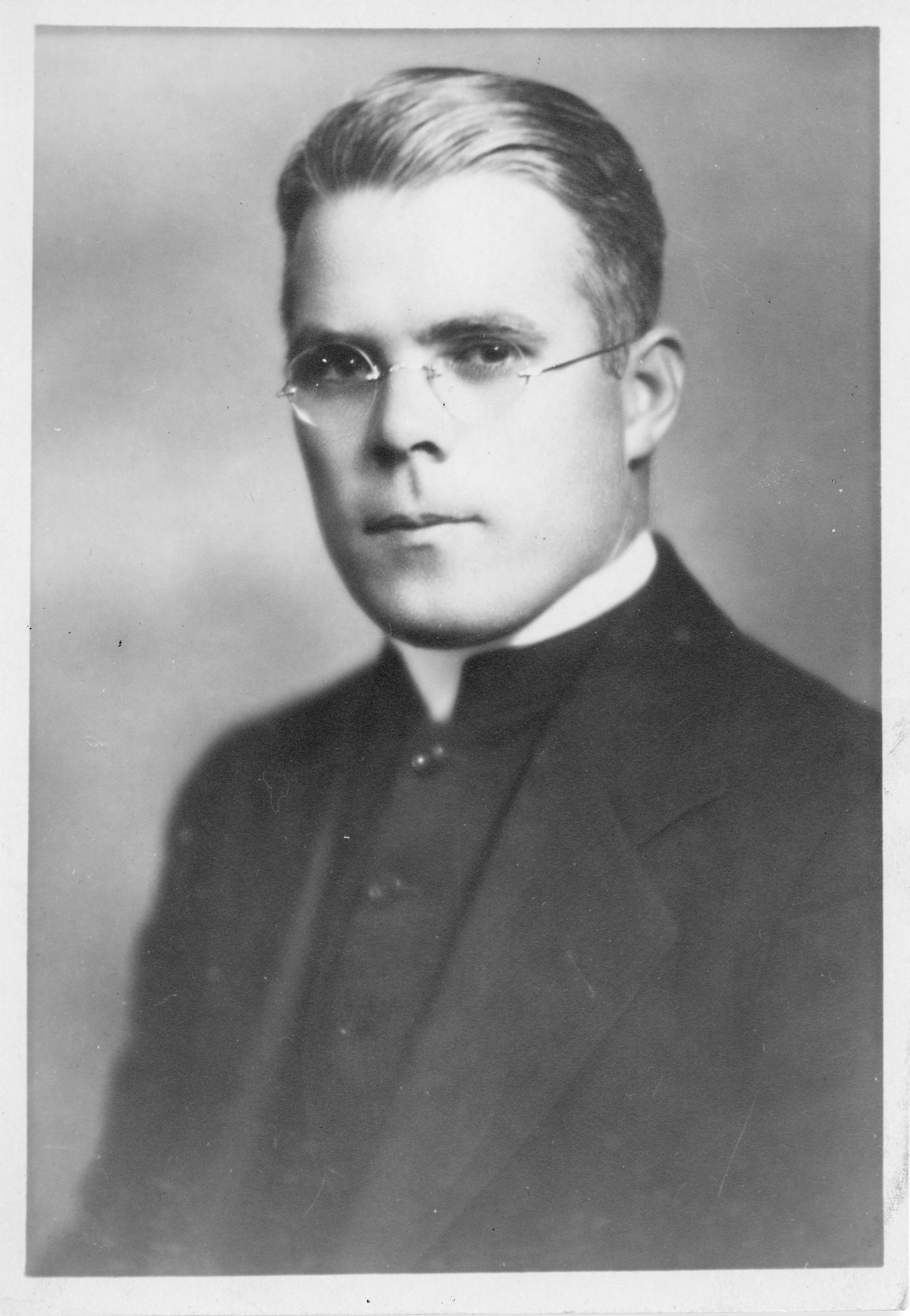
Father Ed Dowling circa 1928

During the early years of Alcoholics Anonymous, a friend of Dowling's from Chicago developed a drinking problem after losing his wife, and in 1940, Dowling took him to an AA meeting. There, he noticed the similarities between the program's twelve-step program and the Spiritual Exercises of Ignatius of Loyola. Dowling then met with AA co-founder Bill W. by arriving at his door unannounced late in the evening. Following this introduction, Bill and Father Dowling (or Father Ed, as he was known within the community) became close friends, and Dowling served as Bill's spiritual advisor. He continued directing struggling alcoholics to the organization, and by the summer of 1940, with his help, Dowling's native St. Louis had its own AA chapter. Dowling was not an alcoholic himself, but used the twelve-step program to get over his own problems of overeating and smoking.

== Other organizations ==
Dowling formed and supported several similar programs. By 1944 he had founded the Cana Conferences (some sources say 1942), a twelve-step program for struggling Catholic couples. The name CANA stands for Couples Are Not Alone, and also references the biblical story of the wedding at Cana, at which Jesus turned water into wine.

Dowling worked with Recovery, Inc. (now Recovery International), bringing the organization to St. Louis just as he had with AA. He did the same for Divorcees Anonymous, a group for those struggling with failed marriages, and a Montserrat group for those with moral dilemmas.

== In popular culture ==
Dowling was portrayed by Norman Shultz in the 2012 Emmy-winning documentary Bill W.

Dawn Eden Goldstein, a theologian and canon lawyer, has written an award winning book called "Father Ed: The Story of Bill W's Spiritual Sponsor". The Book won the New York State Associated Press Association award, as well as the 2023 Christopher Award. New Book about Father Ed by Canon Lawyer
