= 1969 in poetry =

Nationality words link to articles with information on the nation's poetry or literature (for instance, Irish or France).

== Events ==
- March 23 – German-born writer Assia Wevill, a mistress of English poet Ted Hughes (and ex-wife of Canadian poet David Wevill), gasses herself and their daughter at her London home.
- FIELD magazine founded at Oberlin College.
- Charles Bukowski quits his day job as a Post Office clerk in Los Angeles to embark on a writing career after being promised a $100 stipend from Black Sparrow Press. He said at the time: "I have one of two choices — stay in the post office and go crazy ... or stay out here and play at writer and starve. I decided to starve."
- Howard Nemerov named Edward Mallinckrodt Distringuished University Professor of English and Distinguished Poet in Residence at Washington University in St. Louis, posts which he will hold until his death in 1991.
- The Kenyon Review is closed by Kenyon College after 30 years; it will be restarted by the college in 1979
- Sir Arthur Bliss writes a cantata "The world is charged with the grandeur of God", from Gerard Manley Hopkins' sonnet of the same first line.
- Louise Bogan retires after 38 years as poetry critic for The New Yorker.
- Tish literary magazine, founded in Vancouver, British Columbia, Canada, in 1961 and published intermittently thereafter, prints its last issue. Poets associated with the magazine included Frank Davey, Fred Wah, George Bowering, and, briefly, bpNichol when he lived in Vancouver.
- First issue of poetry magazine The Lace Curtain founded and edited by Michael Smith and Trevor Joyce under their New Writers Press imprint in Dublin. It will publish six issues until 1978
- Alexander Tvardovsky, editor of Novy Mir, a Soviet literary magazine, is under attack this year and threatened with dismissal for "spreading cosmopolitan ideas", for "mocking the Soviet peoples' most sacred feelings" and for "denigrating Soviet patriotism". He responds that he was the "real patriot" and was opposed to "reactionary, nationalistic, neo-Slavophil" literary currents

== Works published in English ==
Listed by nation where the work was first published and again by the poet's native land, if different; substantially revised works listed separately:

=== Australia ===
- Bruce Beaver, Letters to Live Poets
- David Malouf, "The Year of the Foxes"
- Les Murray
  - "An Absolutely Ordinary Rainbow"
  - The Weatherboard Cathedral
- Randolph Stow, A Counterfeit Silence: Selected Poems

=== Canada ===
- Milton Acorn, I've Tasted My Blood
- Earle Birney. The poems of Earle Birney: a New Canadian Library selection. (New Canadian library original N06.) Toronto: McClelland and Stewart.
- George Bowering, The Gangs of Kosmos
- Phyllis Gotlieb, Ordinary, Moving
- Ralph Gustafson, Ixion's Wheel
- Irving Layton, Selected Poems. Wynne Francis ed. Toronto: McClelland and Stewart.
- Irving Layton, The Whole Bloody Bird: Obs, Aphs & Pomes. Toronto: McClelland and Stewart.
- Gwendolyn MacEwen, The Shadow Maker
- Tom Marshall, The Silences of Fire
- Alden Nowlan, The Mysterious Naked Man
- Michael Ondaatje, The Man with Seven Toes, Toronto: Coach House Press
- Raymond Souster, So Far So Good: Poems, 1938/1968. Ottawa: Oberon Press.
- Miriam Waddington, Say Yes

=== India, in English ===
- P. Lal, editor, Modern Indian Poetry in English: An Anthology and Credo, Calcutta, Writers Workshop, India, anthology (second, expanded edition, 1971, however, on page 597 of the second edition, an "editor's note" states contents "on the following pages are a supplement to the first edition" and is dated "1972")
- Daisy Aldan, editor, Poems of India; New York, United States.

=== United Kingdom ===
- W. H. Auden, City Without Walls
- Alan Bold, A Perpetual Motion Machine
- Alan Brownjohn, Sandgrains on a Tray
- Basil Bunting, Collected Poems
- Charles Causley, Figure of 8
- Barry Cole, Moonsearch
- Donald Davies, Essex Poems 1963–67
- Douglas Dunn, Terry Street
- James Fenton, Put Thou Thy Tears Into My Bottle, poetry
- Padraic Fiacc, Northern Irish poet published in the United Kingdom:
  - By the Black Stream
  - (edited) The Wearing of the Black
- Roy Fisher, Collected Poems
- Thom Gunn, Poems 1950–1966
- David Harsent, A Violent Country
- Seamus Heaney, Northern Irish poet published in the United Kingdom:
  - Door into the Dark, Faber & Faber
  - A Lough Neagh Sequence, Phoenix
- Adrian Henri, Tonight at Noon
- John Hewitt, Northern Irish poet published in the United Kingdom, Collected Poems, 1932-1967
- Molly Holden, To Make me Grieve
- Anselm Hollo, The Coherences
- Elizabeth Jennings, The Animals' Arrival
- Tom Leonard, Scottish dialect poet, Six Glasgow Poems
- Laurence Lerner, Selves
- Christopher Logue
  - New Numbers
  - The Girls
- Michael Longley, No Continuing City
- Hugh MacDiarmid, pen name of Christopher Murray Grieve, A Clyack-Sheaf
- Roger McGough, Watchwords
- Brian Patten, Notes to the Hurrying Man
- J. H. Prynne, The White Stones
- Iain Crichton Smith, From Bourgeois Land
- Jon Stallworthy, Root and Branch
- Edward Storey, North Bank Night
- David Sutton, Out on a Limb
- Charles Tomlinson, The Way of a World
- Sydney Tremayne, The Turning Sky
- Vernon Watkins, Uncollected Poems, introduction by Kathleen Raine; Welsh poet, posthumous
- Kenneth White, translator, Selected Poems, translated from the original French of André Breton; publisher: Jonathan Cape

==== Children of Albion poetry anthology ====
Children of Albion: Poetry of the Underground in Britain, edited by Michael Horovitz, was the first anthology to present a wide-ranging selection of the new British Poetry Revival movement. Poems from these writers were included in it:

- John Arden
- Peter Armstrong
- Pete Brown
- Jim Burns
- Johnny Byrne
- Charles Cameron
- David Chaloner
- Barry Cole
- John Cotton
- Andrew Crozier
- Dave Cunliffe
- Felix de Mendelssohn
- Raymond Durgnat
- Paul Evans
- Ian Hamilton Finlay
- Roy Fisher
- Harry Guest
- Lee Harwood
- Michael Hastings
- Spike Hawkins
- Geoffrey Hazard
- Piero Heliczer
- Pete Hoida
- Anselm Hollo
- Frances Horovitz
- Michael Horovitz
- Libby Houston
- Mark Hyatt
- John James
- Roger Jones
- David Kerrison
- Seymour King
- Bernard Kops
- David Kozubei
- Herbert Lomas
- Anna Lovell
- Paul Matthews
- Michael McCafferty
- John McGrath
- Tom McGrath
- Stuart Mills
- Ted Milton
- Adrian Mitchell
- Edwin Morgan
- Tina Morris
- Philip O'Connor
- Neil Oram
- Tom Pickard
- Paul Potts
- Tom Raworth
- Carlyle Reedy
- Bernard Saint
- Michael Shayer
- David Sladen
- Tom Taylor
- Barry Tebb
- Chris Torrance
- Alexander Trocchi
- Gael Turnbull
- Patrick Waites
- Nicholas Snowden Willey
- William Wyatt
- Michael X

=== United States ===
- W. H. Auden, City without Walls
- Ted Berrigan, Peace: Broadside
- John Berryman:
  - The Dream Songs (New York: Farrar, Straus & Giroux)
  - His Toy, His Dream His Rest (New York: Farrar, Straus & Giroux)
- Elizabeth Bishop, The Complete Poems (Farrar, Straus, and Giroux)
- Paul Blackburn, Two New Poems
- Louise Bogan, The Blue Estuaries
- Lucille Clifton, Good Times, selected as one of the year's best books by The New York Times
- Robert Creeley, Pieces
- Ed Dorn:
  - Gunslinger: Book II, Black Sparrow Press
  - The Midwest Is That Space Between the Buffalo Statler and the Lawrence Eldridge, T. Williams
  - The Cosmology of Finding Your Spot, Cottonwood
  - Twenty-four Love Songs, Frontier Press
- Ed Dorn and Gordon Brotherston, translators, Jose Emilio Pacheco, Tree Between Two Walls, Black Sparrow Press
- LeRoi Jones, editor, Black Magic: Poetry, 1961-1967
- Hugh Kenner, The Invisible Poet: T. S. Eliot (revised from the 1959 edition), Canadian writing and published in the United States (criticism)
- James Merrill, The Fire Screen
- W. S. Merwin:
  - Animae, San Francisco: Kayak
  - Translator, Transparence of the World, poems by Jean Follain, New York: Atheneum (reprinted in 2003, Port Townsend, Washington: Copper Canyon Press)
  - Translator, Twenty Love Poems and a Song of Despair by Pablo Neruda; London: Cape (reprinted in 2004 with an introduction by Christina Garcia, New York: Penguin Books)
  - Translator, Voices: Selected Writings of Antonio Porchia, Chicago: Follett (reprinted in 1988 and 2003, Port Townsend, Washington: Copper Canyon Press)
- Vladimir Nabokov, Poems and Problems, ISBN 0-07-045724-7
- Lorine Niedecker, T & G: Collected Poems, 1936-1966
- Ron Padgett, Great Balls of Fire, Holt, Rinehart & Winston
- Charles Reznikoff, By the Well of Living & Seeing and The Fifth Book of the Maccabees
- Aram Saroyan, Pages, Random House
- James Schuyler, Freely Espousing
- Charles Simic, Jim Harrison, George Quasha, Dan Gerber, J.D. Reed, Five Blind Men, (Sumac Press)
- Gary Snyder, Smokey the Bear Sutra
- Louis Zukofsky, in collaboration with his wife, Celia, publishes an experimental Latin translation Catullus

=== Other English language ===
- James K. Baxter, Rock Woman, New Zealand
- Charles Brasch: Not Far Off: Poems, Christchurch: Caxton Press, New Zealand
- Edward Brathwaite, Islands, third part of his The Arrivants trilogy, which also includes Rights of Passage (1967) and Masks (1968), Caribbean
- Sam Hunt, From Bottle Creek: Selected Poems 1967–69 New Zealand
- Donagh MacDonagh, A Warning to Conquerors, Ireland
- Wole Soyinka, Poems from Prison (Nigeria)
- Derek Walcott, The Gulf, Caribbean

== Works published in other languages ==
Listed by nation where the work was first published and again by the poet's native land, if different; substantially revised works listed separately:

=== French language ===
==== Canada, in French ====
- André Major, Poèmes pour durer
- Pierre Chatillon, Soleil de bivouac
- Jean-Guy Pilon:
  - Comme Eau retenue (Paris), a republishing of all of his previous books of poems in one volume
  - Saisons pour la continuelle, Paris: Seghers
- Guy Robert, five books of poems
- Jean Royer, Nos corps habitables, Sillery: Éditions de l'Arc
- André Saint-Germain, Sens unique
- Gemma Tremblay, Les Seins gorgés

==== France ====
- Louis Aragon, Les Chambres
- M. Beguey, La Rose ardente
- G. Belloni, La Route du feu
- Luc Bérimont, Un Feu vivant
- M. Berry, Isabelle
- Philippe Chabaneix, Les matins et les soirs
- René Char, La Pluie giboyeuse
- Andrée Chedid:
  - Contre-chat
  - Seul le Visage
- Michel Deguy, Figurations
- P. Dumaine, Inscriptions
- Jacques Dupin, L'embrasure
- Pierre Emmanuel, pen name of Noël Mathieu, Notre Père
- Gérard Genette, Figures II, one of three volumes of a work of critical scholarship in poetics – general theory of literary form and analysis of individual works — the Figures volumes are concerned with the problems of poetic discourse and narrative in Stendhal, Flaubert and Proust and in Baroque poetry (see also Figures I 1966, Figures III 1972)
- Eugene Guilleveic, Ville
- R. Houdelot, Amour en profil perdu
- Philippe Jaccottet:
  - Leçons
  - L'Entretien des muses, a prose account of poetry writing
- Edmond Jabès, Elya
- Michel Leiris, Note sans mémoire, Gallimard
- Loys Masson, La Croix de rose rouge (posthumous)
- Saint-John Perse, Chanté par celle qui fut là [...], Paris: privately printed by Robert Blanchet
- Raymond Queneau, Fendre les flots
- Jean-Claude Renard, La Braise et la Rivière
- S. de Ricard, Les Chemins perdus
- Robert Sabatier won the Grand Prix de Poésie for:
  - Les Poisons délectables
  - Les Châteaux des millions d'années

===== Anthologies =====
- Marc Alyn, editor, La Nouvelle Poésie française
- J. Loisy, editor, Un Certain Choix de poèmes

=== Germany ===
- Hilde Domin, editor, Doppelinterpretationen: Das zeitgenössische deutsche Gedicht zwischen Autor und Leser, Frankfurt and Bonn: Athenaum (scholarship)
- H. Lamprecht, editor, Deutschland, Deutschland: Politische Gedichte, anthology
- Albrecht Schöne, Über politische Lyrik im 20. Jahrhundert, Vandenhoeck & Ruprecht (scholarship)

=== Hebrew ===
- P.Naveh, editor, Lol Shirai Yaakov Frances, the works of a seventeenth-century Italian Hebrew poet
- Rachel u-Michtaveha, Shirai Rachel u-Michtaveha (posthumous)
- A. Broides, Mivhar Shirim
- D. Chomsky, ba-Et u-Veona
- K. A. Bertini, Bakbuk Al Pnai ha-Mayim
- Y. Amichai, Ahshav be-Raash
- Y. Mar, Panim le-Kan (posthumous)
- D. Ravikovich, ha-Sefer ha-Shelishi
- N. Stuchkoff, compiler, Otzar ha-Safa ha-Ivrit (United States)
- G. Churgin, Ojkai Mahshava (United States)
- R. Ben-Yosef, (An American Jew living in Israel) Derech Eretz

=== India ===
Listed in alphabetical order by first name:

- Devarakonda Balagangadhara Tilak, Amrutham Kurisina ratri, ("The Night When Nectar Rained"); Telugu-language, posthumously published, it became the author's best-known work, called a "milestone in modern Telugu" by Sisir Kumar Das
- Nirendranath Chakravarti; Bengali-language:
  - Kolkatar Jishu, Kolkata: Aruna Prokashoni
  - Nirendranath Chakravarti, Nokhotro Joyer Jonno, Kolkata: Surabhi Prokashoni
- Thangjam Ibopishak Singh, Apaiba Thawai ("The Hovering Soul"), Imphal: Naharol Sahitya Premee Samiti; Meitei language

=== Italy ===
- Guido Ceronetti, Poesie, frammenti, poesie separate
- Giuseppe Favati, Controbuio
- Albino Pierro, Eccò 'a morte ("Why Death?"), in the Tursi language (Lucania)

==== Other ====
- Miguel de Unamuno, edited by Roberto Paoli, Poesie, scholarly survey of his verse, with a selection of his Spanish poems with Italian translations

=== Norway ===
- Paal Brekke, editor, Norsk lyrikk nå (anthology of Norwegian poetry of the 1960s)
- Tarjei Vesaas, collected poems
- Georg Johannesen, collected poems

=== Poland ===
- Edward Balcerzan – Granica na moment
- Stanisław Grochowiak - Nie było lata
- Zbigniew Herbert – Napis
- Tadeusz Różewicz - Regio

=== Portuguese ===
==== Brazil ====
- Gregório de Matos (1633–1696), edited by James Amado, Obras Completas
- Décio Pignatari, Exercicio Findo

==== Portugal ====
- Ruy de Moura Belo, Homem de palavra[s] ("A Man of [His] Word[s]")

=== Russia ===
- Evgeni Vinokurov, Selected Poems
- Vladimir Sokolov, Snow in September
- Konstantin Vanshenkin, Experience
- Aleksandr Tvardovsky, Lyrical Poems
- Andrei Voznesensky, "I Can't Write" a poem published in Phoenix, a broadsheet newspaper
- Robert Rozhdestvenski, Poem About Different Points of View, a long poem published in Yunost

=== Spanish poetry ===
==== Spain ====
- Matilde Camus:
  - Voces (Voices)
  - Vuelo de estrellas (Stars flight)

==== Mexico ====
- Octavio Paz, Ladera Este
- R. Bonifaz Nuño, El ala del tigre
- Rosario Castellanos, Materia memorable
- Carlos Pellicer, Antología
- Efraín Huerta, a collection
- M. Michelena, a collection
- M. Guardia, a collection
- Gabriel Zaid, a book of new poetry
- Homero Aridjis, a book of new poetry
- M. A. Montes de Oca, a book of new poetry
- Juan Bañuelos, a book of new poetry
- José Emilio Pacheco, a book of new poetry

==== Other Latin America ====
- Jorge Luis Borges:
  - Nueva antología personal
  - Elogio de las sombras
- A. Pizarnik, Extracción de la piedra de la locura
- F. Urondo, Adolecer
- Pablo Neruda, Fin de mundo
- Luis Cardoza y Aragón, Dibujos de ciego (Guatemala)
- Ernesto Cardenal, Homenaje a los indios americanos (Nicaragua)
- P. A. Cuadra, Poesía escogida (Nicaragua)
- César Velejo, Obra poética completa (Peru)
- Roque Dalton, Taberna y otros lugares (El Salvador)

=== Sweden ===
- Lars Norén, Revolver
- Majken Johansson, Omtal
- Elsa Grave, Vid nödläge
- Reidar Ekner, Andhämtning, builder

=== Yiddish ===
- Abraham Sutzkever, Poems from the Dead Sea
- Chaim Grade, On My Way to You
- Moyshe Knapheys, a new collection
- Leyb Morgentoy, a new collection
- Chaim Leib Fox, a new collection
- Israel Emiot, a new collection
- Jacob Glatstein in an essay, said the poet should be a spokesman for his generation, and his poetry should be a poetry of involvement.
- Leon Kusman, a new collection
- Yitskhok Elkhonen Rontsh, a new collection
- M. M. Shafir, a new collection

=== Other ===
- Inger Christensen, it (det, later translated into English by Susanna Nied); Denmark
- Syed Shamsul Haque, Boishekhe Rochito Ponktimala ("Verses of Boishakh") and Birotihin Utsob ("The ceaseless festival"), Bengali published in East Pakistan
- Kurt Marti, Leichenreden (Switzerland) in German, a collection of humorous verse variations of death notices and conventional funeral orations.
- Kirsten Thorup, Love from Trieste; Denmark

== Awards and honors ==
=== Australia ===
- Grace Leven Prize for Poetry: Randolph Stow, A Counterfeit Silence: Selected Poems

=== Canada ===
- See 1969 Governor General's Awards for a complete list of winners and finalists for those awards.

=== United Kingdom ===
- Bollingen Prize: John Berryman and Karl Shapiro
- Cholmondeley Award: Derek Walcott, Tony Harrison
- Eric Gregory Award: Gavin Bantock, Jeremy Hooker, Jenny King, Neil Powell, Landeg E. White
- Queen's Gold Medal for Poetry: Stevie Smith

=== United States ===
- National Book Award for Poetry: John Berryman, His Toy, His Dream, His Rest
- Pulitzer Prize for Poetry: George Oppen: Of Being Numerous
- Fellowship of the Academy of American Poets: Richard Eberhart and Anthony Hecht

== Births ==
- March 14 – Murray Lachlan Young, American-born British poet and performer
- March 29 – Ranjit Hoskote, Indian poet
- April 18 – C. Dale Young, American poet
- July 28 – Anthony Butts, American poet
- Stephanie Bolster, Canadian poet
- Matthias Goritz, German poet
- Hauke Huckstadt, German poet
- Davis McCombs, American poet

== Deaths ==
Birth years link to the corresponding "[year] in poetry" article:

- February 19 – Kazimierz Wierzynski, 74, Polish poet
- March 12 – André Salmon, 87, French poet, critic and novelist
- March 25 – Max Eastman, 86, American poet and editor
- April 22 – Rolfe Humphries, 74, American poet, of emphysema
- May 4 – Sir Osbert Sitwell, 76, English writer, of a heart attack
- May 26 – Henry Rago, 53, American poet and editor of Poetry
- July 11 – Guilherme de Almeida, 78, "prince of Brazilian poetry"
- July 23 – Floyd Bell, 82, of a heart ailment
- July 27 – Vivian de Sola Pinto, 73, British poet, memoirist, literary critic and historian
- August 18 – Humayun Kabir (Bengali: হুমায়ুন কবির), 63 (born 1906), Bengali poet, educationist, politician, writer and philosopher
- October 21 – Jack Kerouac, 47, influential American Beat Generation poet, writer and novelist, of internal hemorrhage and cirrhosis
- Also:
  - Loys Masson (born 1915), French poet
  - W. R. Rodgers (born 1909), Irish poet, essayist, book reviewer, radio broadcaster, script writer, lecturer, teacher and Presbyterian minister

== See also ==
- Poetry
- List of poetry awards
- List of years in poetry
