= Children of Albion: Poetry of the Underground in Britain =

Children of Albion: Poetry of the Underground in Britain, an anthology of poetry, was edited by Michael Horovitz and published by Penguin Books in 1969 (see 1969 in poetry). According to Martin Booth it was "virtually a manifesto of New Departures doctrine and dogma".

Its appearance was a key step in the emergence to some kind of public attention of many of the poets associated with the British Poetry Revival, many of whom were included. It was perhaps the classic "hippie" collection of British poetry, with its self-conscious invocation of William Blake and performance poets. It has also been subject to much criticism, qua anthology of its time, both for its inclusions and exclusions.

== Book ==
Children of Albion was published as a paperback measuring 18 by 11 centimetres (7.1 by 4.3 in). It is 382 pages long and contains a contents list, a dedication to Allen Ginsberg, work by 63 poets in alphabetical order of surname, an essay, "Afterwords" by the editor, and "further reading" and "acknowledgements" sections. The front cover features a detail from Glad Day, an engraving by Blake.

== Poets featured ==
The poets featured in Children of Albion are:

- John Arden
- Peter Armstrong
- Pete Brown
- Jim Burns
- Johnny Byrne
- Charles Cameron
- David Chaloner
- Barry Cole
- John Cotton
- Andrew Crozier
- Dave Cunliffe
- Felix de Mendelssohn
- Raymond Durgnat
- Paul Evans
- Ian Hamilton Finlay
- Roy Fisher
- Harry Guest
- Lee Harwood
- Michael Hastings
- Spike Hawkins
- Geoffrey Hazard
- Piero Heliczer
- Pete Hoida
- Anselm Hollo
- Frances Horovitz
- Michael Horovitz
- Libby Houston
- Mark Hyatt
- John James
- Roger Jones
- David Kerrison
- Seymour King
- Bernard Kops
- David Kozubei
- Herbert Lomas
- Anna Lovell
- Paul Matthews
- Michael McCafferty
- John McGrath
- Tom McGrath
- Stuart Mills
- Ted Milton
- Adrian Mitchell
- Edwin Morgan
- Tina Morris
- Philip O'Connor
- Neil Oram
- Tom Pickard
- Paul Potts
- Tom Raworth
- Carlyle Reedy
- Bernard Saint
- Michael Shayer
- David Sladen
- Nicholas Snowdon Willey
- Tom Taylor
- Barry Tebb
- Chris Torrance
- Alexander Trocchi
- Gael Turnbull
- Patrick Waites
- William Wyatt
- Michael X

== Historical context ==
In 1962, Penguin published Al Alvarez's anthology The New Poetry. This marked the beginnings of a backlash against what Alvarez labelled the "gentility" of the Movement poets. Alvarez's favoured alternative were such poets as Sylvia Plath and Ted Hughes and others who connected with American confessional poets like Robert Lowell and John Berryman.

Meanwhile, Donald Allen's 1960 anthology, The New American Poetry 1945-1960 introduced British and other readers to a whole range of work other than the confessionals. Allen included work by the Beat Generation, the Black Mountain, New York School and Deep image poets and others from outside the mainstream.

As British 1960s counterculture developed (see Swinging London), the influence of these poets became more widespread, and many of the younger British poets began to experiment with local variants of the new poetics. Publishing outlets for the new poetry started to emerge, including Raworth's Matrix Press, and Goliard Press (which he ran with Barry Hall) and Horovitz's own New Departures magazine and press.

In 1963, for instance, Amselm Hollo brought together the anthology Jazz Poems, which featured 10 of the poets who would go on to be included in Children of Albion including Michael Horovitz.

Contacts between poets on both sides of the Atlantic developed, culminating in the International Poetry Incarnation at the Royal Albert Hall on 11 June 1965, which featured readings by a range of British poets, as well as Ginsberg, Lawrence Ferlinghetti and others to an audience of 7,000 people. Horovitz was the main organizer of this event and this Afterwords essay makes it clear that the success of the Albert Hall happening was the inspiration for the assembly of the anthology.

== Reputation ==
One of the main criticisms leveled at Children of Albion is that it contains work by a large number of poets who subsequently ceased writing, or at least publishing, poetry of any note. The book also has been criticised for omitting poets who did not share Horovitz's enthusiasms for Blake and/or performance.

Only five of Albion's 63 children are daughters. Omissions have also been noted, such as the Liverpool poets. Missing are major figures, for example J. H. Prynne and Veronica Forrest-Thomson. The British underground poetry scene in the mid-1960s was a male-dominated affair. Later anthologists, also fail on gender parity in their representations of the period.

Andrew Crozier and Tim Longville's A Various Art, a later anthology from 1987, has been seen as a reply. Iain Sinclair writing in the introduction to Conductors of Chaos (1996) puts its success down to the Zeitgeist of "frivolous times".

== See also ==
- 1969 in poetry
- 1969 in literature
- English poetry
- List of poetry anthologies
