= Second Aeon =

Second Aeon was a British literary periodical published from late 1966 to early 1975. It ran for 21 issues and was edited by Peter Finch. A spin-off of the magazine was Second Aeon Publications, a series of booklets, broadsheets and bound volumes that eventually reached 100 in number.

== Issues and contributors ==
=== Issue 1 ===
late 1966

Peter Finch

=== Issue 2 ===
June, 1967

Wes Magee, Adrian Mitchell, and others

=== Issue 3 ===
September, 1967

Stephen Morris, Anna Scher, and others

=== Issue 4 ===
early 1968

Brian Wake, Peter Hoida, Paul Green, and others

=== Issue 5 ===
mid 1968

Adrian Henri, Mike Horovitz, Chris Torrance, and others

=== Issue 6 ===
late 1968

David Roberts, Jim Burns, J. Gwyn Griffiths, Bob Cobbing, Allen Ginsberg, Raymond Garlick, Alan Jackson, and Umberto Saba

=== Issue 7 ===
early 1969

d a levy, Brian Patten, Leroi Jones, John Fairfax, Tony Curtis and others

=== Issue 8 & 9 (double) ===
mid 1969

William Wantling, Pablo Neruda, Iain Sinclair, Doug Blazek, Roger McGough, Martin Booth, and Alan Sillitoe

=== Issue 10 ===
December, 1969

Edwin Morgan, Peter Mayer, Harry Guest, Gene Fowler, Alan Bold, Barry MacSweeney, Alan Perry, Gary Snyder, Paul Evans, and others.

=== Issue 11 ===
1970

Jeff Nuttall, John Ormond, James Blish, Owen Davis, Pete Hoida, and others

=== Issue 12 ===
1970

Dannie Abse, George Barker, Frances Horovitz, Peter Redgrove, Tom Raworth, John Tripp, Paul Brown, Henri Chopin, and others.

=== Issue 13 ===
1971

Robert Bly, Charles Bukowski, Emyr Humphreys, John James, George Macbeth, Yukio Mishima, Penelope Shuttle, David Tipton, Tristan Tzara, Herbert Williams, Jennifer Pike, Ian Robinson, and others

=== Issue 14 ===
1972

Alan Bold, Tom Phillips, Bill Butler, Roy Fuller, Marilyn Hacker, D. M. Thomas, Octavio Paz, Leslie Norris, Susan Musgrave, Edward Lucie-Smith, Federico García Lorca, Kris Hemensley and others

=== Issue 15 ===
1973

Michael Butterworth, Cid Corman, D. M. Black, Robert Desnos, John Digby, Clayton Eshleman, Ruth Feldman, Raymond Garlick, Paul Gogarty, Harry Guest, Adrian Henri, Dick Higgins, John James, Eric Mottram, Cesare Pavese, Miklos Radnoti, R. S. Thomas, Gael Turnbull, Philip Whalen, and others.

=== Issue 16-17 ===
1973

Antipater of Sidon, William S. Burroughs, William Cox, Theodore Enslin, Duncan Glen, Yannis Goumas, Bill Griffiths, Holderlin, Peter Jay, Peter Levi, Nossis, Theodore Weiss, William Sherman, John Riley, Tom Pickard, Alexis Lykiard, and others.

=== Issue 18 ===
1974

Tom Phillips, Paul Celan, Stéphane Mallarmé, Tristan Tzara, Cesare Pavese, David Black, Tony Conran, Gavin Ewart, Jack Hirschman, Alan Jackson, James Kirkup, John Wain, Charles Plymell, Thomas Tessier, and others

=== Issue 19-21 ===
1975

Antonin Artaud, Paul Auster, Harry Bell, Keith Bosley, René Char, Larry Eigner, Robin Fulton, Philip Holmes, Pierre Joris, John Montague, Susan Musgrave, Robert Nye, Benjamin Péret, William Rowe, Matt Simpson, David Tipton, Tomas Tranströmer, Vallejo, John Welch, J. L. Wilkinson, and others
