= The English Intelligencer =

British magazine devoted to poetry and letters

The English Intelligencer was a mid-1960s little magazine devoted to poetry and letters founded and edited by poets Andrew Crozier and Peter Riley. It played a key role in the emergence of many of the poets associated with the British Poetry Revival, and was conceived as providing a forum for exchange and building a sense of community among scattered British avant-garde poets who were in contact with and responding to the New American Poets, especially Charles Olson.

== History ==
The English Intelligencer's name is likely to have been influenced by the Cambridge Intelligencer, a political newspaper published from 1793 to 1803, which included works by radical poets. In 2009, Elaine Feinstein recalled that Charles Olson's work had been a major shared influence among contributors to the Intelligencer.

The Intelligencer was circulated to a mailing list of British poets; the number of correspondents varied between 25 and 65, with a constant core of about a dozen. It was mimeographed and appeared roughly every three weeks, with the total run amounting to 36 issues between January 1966 and April 1968. It was delivered for free to its contributors. The first and second issues were edited by Cozier and Riley respectively. The magazine was produced at little cost using J. H. Prynne's access to a Xerox machine at Gonville and Caius College, Cambridge. Aside from the editors, the poets and writers who contributed and/or corresponded with the Intelligencer included Jim Burns, David Chaloner, Feinstein, John Hall, Lee Harwood, John James, Barry MacSweeney, Jeff Nuttall, Douglas Oliver, Tom Pickard, Prynne, Tom Raworth, John Riley, C. H. Sisson, Chris Torrance and Gael Turnbull.

Many of the poets who corresponded in the Intelligencer met face-to-face for the first time at the Sparty Lea Festival at MacSweeney's home in 1967.

Throughout the publication's history, participants disagreed over its orientation toward questions of land and nation. In December 1966, amid disputes over the value of the Intelligencer and its future, Prynne wrote that he had lost trust in the project's "shared language". The following month, Riley wrote to reaffirm the necessity of communication and communality. In May 1967, MacSweeney submitted a letter criticising what he perceived as the journal's hermeticism and undue emphasis on Olson's influence. The journal dissolved in acrimonious circumstances in 1968.

== Influence ==
Daniel Eltringham argues that the Intelligencer influenced later modernist landscape poetry in the United Kingdom by drawing attention to histories of commons and enclosure. Eltringham also suggests, however, that the publication's small circulation limited its political efficacy, and notes that its mailing list included only four women.
