= Adam Horowitz (disambiguation) =

Adam Horowitz is an actor and screenwriter.

Adam Horowitz may also refer to:

- Adam Horowitz (journalist), co-editor of Mondoweiss

== See also ==
- Adam Horovitz (disambiguation)
