= Alexis Lykiard =

British writer and translator (born 1940)

- Born: Constantinos Alexis Lykiardopoulos; 1940 (age 85–86); Athens, Greece
- Education: King's College, Cambridge
- Occupations: Novelist, poet, translator
- Website: www.alexislykiard.com

Alexis Lykiard (born 1940) is a British writer of Greek heritage, who began his prolific career as novelist and poet in the 1960s. His poems about jazz have received particular acclaim, including from Maya Angelou, Hugo Williams, Roy Fisher, Kevin Bailey and others. Lykiard is also known as translator of Isidore Ducasse, Comte de Lautréamont, Alfred Jarry, Antonin Artaud and many notable French literary figures. In addition, Lykiard has written two highly praised intimate memoirs of Jean Rhys: Jean Rhys Revisited (2000) and Jean Rhys: Afterwords (2006).

According to David Woolley of Poetry Wales:

As poet, novelist and translator, Alexis Lykiard has won many admirers over the years, but the early novels apart, his work has not received the popular attention it deserves. He has created a body of work that is erudite and witty but never obscure ... Lykiard's language is vivid, breathtaking in its sheer physicality, while still suggesting more ...

== Early life and education ==
He was born Constantinos Alexis Lykiardopoulos in Athens, Greece, in 1940, to a mother, Maria Casdagli who was from Salford (her family being involved with the Lancashire cotton industry), while his father Antonis Lykiardopoulos hailed from the island of Chios. Lykiard left Greece with his parents just after the German occupation, at the start of the four-year Greek Civil War, travelling via relatives in Egypt to England. He has lived since 1946 in the UK, where he learned English and was duly anglicised from the age of six.

In 1957, at the age of 17, he won the first Open English Scholarship ever awarded by King's College, Cambridge, graduating with a First-class Honours degree in 1962. While at Cambridge University, he was editor of the university magazine Granta (originally called The Granta), and on his watch contributors included Paul Overy, Rackstraw Downes, Stephen Frears, Tony Tanner, Richard Boston, John Fortune, Stephen Bann, David Holbrook, John Barrell, Richard Griffiths, David Rubadiri, Lionel Grigson and Alun Morgan, among others.

== Writings ==
=== Fiction ===
Lykiard's debut novel The Summer Ghosts, written when he was a teenager, was a best-seller in the 1960s, dealing explicitly with sex in the era following the Lady Chatterley trial – "Described on the cover blurb as 'the literary bombshell of the year,' this is a young author's 'literary' first novel, full of complexity and poetic descriptions, the narrative framework being the protagonist's drafting a therapeutic memoir while in a Bournemouth psychiatric clinic after a breakdown." Lykiard published eight further novels – including the autobiographical Strange Alphabet (set in the Greece of 1970) and The Drive North (depicting the life of a freelance writer) – before abandoning fiction in favour of his first love, poetry. His last published novel was based on and took its name from the 1982 British drama film Scrubbers directed by Mai Zetterling, and was written to coincide with the film's release.

=== Poetry ===
His numerous collections of poems have been widely praised, and include Milesian Fables, 1976 ("... an epigrammatic quality – fresh and honest transmissions of experience" – Gavin Ewart; "Very good indeed, entertaining, well-made, and with lovely modulations of mood form grave and tender to the witty and ironic" – Vernon Scannell), Cat Kin, 1994 ("Contagiously cat-like in all its dexterous twists" – Ted Hughes); Living Jazz, 1990 ("Thank you for loving enough and living enough to write Living Jazz" – Maya Angelou) and Skeleton Keys, 2003, of which Angus Calder wrote: "His argument with the world is brilliantly waged. Readers will learn a lot while they are moved by it." The suite of poems that makes up Skeleton Keys explores the troubled era in Greece into which Lykiard was born, reassessing his personal ties with that history – involving family secrets and lies, public and private betrayal and heroism – "to underline how truth and lies are relative at last".

Lykiard's 40-year collection, Selected Poems 1956–96, received appreciative critical accolades, with Dominic Behan calling Lykiard "The heir to my friend Louis Macneice", while Kevin Bailey wrote: "Alexis Lykiard is the true lineal heir to Lord Rochester and Dean Swift. He is an unsettling poet to read.... Forty years devotion to one craft – that of Writer. And his earthly reward from this philistine and anti-intellectual English society? An obscurity and relative poverty that is the inverse of his talent and contribution he has made to British literary culture... The voice of quality and reason in an age of kitsch... This book is certainly a must buy."

His recent poetry publications have focused on the haiku, and Andy Croft reviewing 2017's Haiku High and Low, which he described as "a new batch of satirical epigrams", said: "Alexis Lykiard as always gives the traditional Japanese lyrical form a witty and satisfying punch." Of his latest publication, Winter Crossings: Poems 2012–2020 Merryn Williams said that "this poet obviously does not mean to go gently into the night. Let's all hope that if we live to be eighty we can write like that. Shoestring can be proud of its newest books."

=== Non-fiction ===
Lykiard has in addition written non-fiction, including two books that draw on his friendship with Jean Rhys (Lykiard is a long-time resident of Exeter, Devon, and would visit Rhys in the nearby village of Cheriton Fitzpaine, where she lived for the last two decades of her life): Jean Rhys Revisited (2000) and Jean Rhys: Afterwords (2006). Reviewing the former, Iain Sinclair characterised it as "A haunted meditation....A proper tribute to the unjustly reforgotten, as well as an heroic version of the writer's life, the slanted autobiography", while Chris Petit wrote in The Guardian:

The richness of Lykiard's book depends on it offering more than just a memoir....He is alert to the sharpness of Rhys's inner voice, her psychological acuity and the torpor of her stories in contrast to the exactness of her prose; he, like Rhys, is drawn to careless lives. As well as being a meditation on the nature and business of writing, Jean Rhys Revisited is a piece of literary archaeology and a book of enthusiasms (Hamsun, Gissing, George Moore) that performs a useful act of referral. It is also a considered work about old age and beyond – Lykiard writes movingly about Rhys's fear of her approaching death – written by a man who was young when he knew Rhys, and is now approaching his own old age.

== As translator ==
Lykiard is a respected translator from French of avant-garde classics, including the complete works of Lautréamont, and novels by Alfred Jarry and Apollinaire (complete and unexpurgated versions of the erotic novellas Les Onze Mille Verges and Les Memoires D'Un Jeune Don Juan for the first time in English), alongside Surrealist prose and poetry, Louis Aragon, Jacques Prévert and Pierre Mac Orlan (the first unexpurgated translation of Masochists in America).

Lykiard's translation of Les Chants de Maldoror by Isidore Ducasse, originally published in 1970 by Allison and Busby, was the first complete annotated English edition of the work, and provided "a close reading of the original text that is stylistically accomplished (as might be expected of a professional translator who made some mark as a novelist in his own right in the 1960s and 1970s)." Exact Change published Maldoror & the Complete Works of the Comte de Lautréamont in 1994, when the Washington Post Book World said: "Alexis Lykiard's translation is both subtle and earthy... this is the best translation now available." Containing "a translation not only of all Ducasse's major texts but also of some more marginal pieces, and a thorough critical apparatus", it remains the only one-volume annotated edition.

== Bibliography ==
=== Fiction ===
- 1964: The Summer Ghosts (Blond)
- 1966: Zones (Blond)
- 1967: A Sleeping Partner (Weidenfeld & Nicolson)
- 1970: Strange Alphabet: A Novel of Modern Greece (Weidenfeld & Nicolson)
- 1973: The Stump (Hart-Davis, MacGibbon)
- 1974: Instrument of Pleasure (Panther Original)
- 1976: Last Throes (Panther Original)
- 1977: The Drive North (Allison & Busby)
- 1982: Scrubbers (W. H. Allen, ISBN 978-0352313430)

=== Poetry ===
- 1963: Journey of the Alchemist (Sebastian Carter)
- 1967: Paros Poems: An Island Sequence (Athens: Aiphroe)
- 1969: Robe of Skin (Allison & Busby; ISBN 978-0850310092)
- 1972: Eight Love Songs (Transgravity; ISBN 0-85682-005-9)
- 1972: Greek Images (Second Aeon Publications)
- 1973: Lifelines (Arc Publications)
- 1976: Milesian Fables (Arc; ISBN 978-0902771505)
- 1976: A Morden Tower Reading (with Vernon Scannell; Morden Tower Publications; ISBN 0-905760-00-X)
- 1985: Cat Kin I (Rivelin Grapheme Press; ISBN 0-947612-08-4)
- 1985: Out of Exile (Selected Poems 1968–85) (Arc; ISBN 0-902771-77-9)
- 1990: Living Jazz (Tenormen Press; ISBN 0-9514903-0-3)
- 1990: Safe Levels (Stride; ISBN 0-946699-84-4)
- 1991: A Lowdown Ecstasy (with Christopher Cook; Spacex Literature)
- 1992: Food for the Dragon (with Christopher Cook, John Daniel, Tony Lopez)
- 1993: Beautiful Is Enough (Westwords)
- 1994: Cat Kin (rev/expanded edn; Sinclair-Stevenson; ISBN 1-85619-463-9)
- 1995: Omnibus Occasions (Headlock Press)
- 1996: Selected Poems 1956–96 (University of Salzburg; ISBN 3-7052-0960-4)
- 2003: Skeleton Keys (Redbeck Press; ISBN 1-904338-04-6)
- 2007: Judging By Disappearances: Poems 1996–2006 (Bluechrome; ISBN 978-1-906061-24-1)
- 2008: Unholy Empires (Anarchios Press; ISBN 978-0-9558738-0-5)
- 2009: Haiku Of Five Decades (Anarchios Press; ISBN 978-0-9558738-1-2)
- 2009: Travelling Light – Thirty Haiku (Anarchios Press, Limited Edition – 100 signed copies)
- 2010: Haiku at Seventy (Anarchios Press; ISBN 978-0-9558738-2-9)
- 2012: Getting On – Poems 2000 – 2012 (Shoestring Press; ISBN 978-1-907356-46-9)
- 2013: Old Dogs and No Tricks – Forty plus haiku (Anarchios Press Limited Edition, 100 signed copies)
- 2014: Divers Haiku – Forty odd haiku (Anarchios Press Limited Edition, 100 signed copies)
- 2015: Schooled For Life (Shoestring Press, ISBN 978-1-910323-41-0)
- 2017: Haiku High and Low (Anarchios Press Limited edition 100 copies signed)
- 2018: Time's Whirligig (Anarchios Press Limited edition 100 copies signed)
- 2020: Feet First: Haiku at Eighty (Anarchios Press Limited edition 100 copies signed)
- 2020: Winter Crossings: Poems 2012–2020 (Shoestring Press, ISBN 978-1-912524-62-4)

=== Non-fiction ===
- 1993: The Cool Eye (texts of two interviews with Lawrence Ferlinghetti; Stride; ISBN 1 873012 49 7)
- 2000: Jean Rhys Revisited (Stride Publications; ISBN 1-900152-68-1)
- 2006: Jean Rhys: Afterwords (Shoestring Press; ISBN 978-1904886341)

=== Selected translations ===
- 1970: Lautréamont's Maldoror (Allison & Busby)
- 1977: Lautréamont's Poésies (Allison & Busby)
- 1989: Alfred Jarry, Days And Nights (Atlas Press, ISBN 978-0947757199)
- 1994: Maldoror & the Complete Works – Comte de Lautréamont (Exact Change)
- 1995: Guillaume Apollinaire, Flesh Unlimited (Creation Books)
- 2003: Antonin Artaud, Heliogabalus (Creation Books, ISBN 978-1840680157)
- 2011: Pierre Mac Orlan, Masochists in America (Penniless Press Publications, ISBN 978-1-4478-4656-7)
- 2019: Antonin Artaud, Heliogabalus or, the Crowned Anarchist (Infinity Land Press, ISBN 978-1916009110)
