= Peter Riley =

English poet, essayist, and editor

- Born: 1940 (age 85–86); Stockport, England
- Education: Stockport Grammar School
- Alma mater: Pembroke College, Cambridge
- Occupations: Poet, essayist and editor
- Notable credit: The Fortnightly Review
- Awards: Cholmondeley Award (2012)

Arthur Peter Riley (born 1940) is a contemporary English poet, essayist, and editor. Riley is known as a Cambridge poet, part of the group loosely associated with J. H. Prynne which today is acknowledged as an important center of innovative poetry in the United Kingdom. Riley was an editor and major contributor to The English Intelligencer. He is the author of ten books of poetry, and many small-press booklets. He is also the current poetry editor of The Fortnightly Review and a recipient of the Cholmondeley Award in 2012 for "achievement and distinction in poetry".

== Early life ==
Peter Riley was born in Stockport, near Manchester, England, and was raised in an environment of working people. Entering higher education "through Britain's post-war socialistic educational policies", he attended Stockport Grammar School and Pembroke College, Cambridge, where he read English, and has since lived and worked in the UK and abroad in teaching at several levels and other occupations. For nearly thirty years he was resident in Cambridge, where he ran a mail-order poetry book business, and he now lives in West Yorkshire.

== Career ==
He has written studies of Jack Spicer, T. F. Powys, improvised music, poetry, lead mines, burial mounds, village carols and Transylvanian string bands, and has published two books of translations from the French poet Lorand Gaspar. Riley has been an advocate for neglected British poets from the 1930s and 1940s, in particular Nicholas Moore (1918–1986), and has edited several posthumous books of Moore's.

Riley was the co-editor (with Andrew Crozier and others) of the important poetry/poetics journal The English Intelligencer (1965–1968), and editor of the later Collection (1968–1970). From the 1980s to the 2000s he ran the imprint Poetical Histories, which focussed on brief (4–12pp) pamphlets published on fine paper. Notable publications included J.H. Prynne's Marzipan and his sole poem in Chinese, Jie ban mi Shi Hu; R. F. Langley's Man Jack; and late work by the older poets Seán Rafferty and Dorian Cooke.

In the 1970s, Riley was an important early promoter of and advocate for British free improvisation, and the noted guitarist Derek Bailey was a lifelong friend; two of Bailey's late solo albums, Takes Fakes & Dead She Dances and Poetry and Playing, contain tracks of Bailey playing guitar while reading aloud from Riley's poetry. Several books of Riley's from this period are responses to free jazz and free improvisation: The Musicians The Instruments (poetry, The Many Press, 1978) and Company Week (prose, Compatible Recording and Publishing, 1994) in response to Bailey's 1977 Company Week event, and The Whole Band (Sesheta, 1972), in response to performances by John Tchicai's Cadentia Nova Danica. This habit of responding to music in his poetry has continued in more recent work, such as the Reader/Author/Lecture series (with poems for or after Syd Barrett, Arnold Schoenberg, John Sheppard and others) and his more recent books concerning music encountered on his travels in Eastern Europe.

Riley was the subject of an essay collection, The Poetry of Peter Riley (The Gig, 1999/2000) and a poetry festschrift, April Eye (Infernal Methods, 2000).

== Excavations and Riley's poetics ==
Distant Points is a series of prose poems arising from the author's meditations on 19th-century excavation reports of prehistoric burial mounds in the north of England. As Riley himself explains, this particular work is:

"... concerned with the human burial deposits of the so-called Neolithic/Bronze Age culture of what is now the Yorkshire Wolds, as documented in two books of late 19th Century tumulus excavation accounts: by J. R. Mortimer (1905) and Canon William Greenwell (1877)."

Commenting on this work, American poet and Zukofsky scholar Mark Scroggins offers this insight:

Each poem is titled with the numerical designation of an individual excavation, and combines verbatim descriptions of the mound's contents – often eliciting a good deal of unintentional (to their original authors) pathos – with linguistic material Riley draws from any number of other sources: various works on Renaissance music, Ezra Pound, Søren Kierkegaard, Jacques Roubaud, Elaine Scarry, Beckett, Sir Thomas Browne, etc. It makes for a fascinating mix, which grows in emotional intensity over the course of the book. This strikes me as an extraordinary poetry, one which takes the techniques of modernism to almost a certain limit, yet retains the entire lyric and emotional intensity of the English tradition behind Riley

== Selected publications ==
- Love-Strife Machine (Ferry Press, 1969)
- The Linear Journal (Grosseteste Press, 1973)
- Strange Family: 12 Songs (Burning Deck, Providence, 1973)
- Preparations: 26 Commentaries (Curiously Strong, 1979)
- Lines on the Liver (Ferry Press, 1981)
- Tracks and Mineshafts (Grosseteste Press, 1983)
- Noon Province (Poetical Histories, Cambridge, 1989)
- Distant Points: Excavations Part One, Books One and Two (Reality Street Editions, 1995)
- Snow has Settled ... Bury Me Here (Shearsman Books, 1997)
- Passing Measures, Selected poems 1966–1996 (Carcanet, 2000)
- Messenger Street (Poetical Histories, 2001) note: this is a pamphlet containing four elegies for the poet Douglas Oliver
- The Dance at Mociu (Shearsman, 2003)
- Alstonefield: a poem (Carcanet, 2003)
- The Day's Final Balance: uncollected writings 1965–2006 (Shearsman, 2007)
- The Llyn Writings (Shearsman, 2007)
- Greek Passages (Shearsman, 2009)
- The Derbyshire Poems (Shearsman, 2010) note: this is a one-volume reissue of Tracks and Mineshafts and Lines on the Liver with additional material
- The Glacial Stairway (Carcanet, 2011)
- XIV PIECES (Longbarrow Press, 2012)
- The Ascent of Kinder Scout (Longbarrow Press, 2014)
- Due North (Shearsman, 2015)
- The Fortnightly Reviews: Poetry Notes 2012-2014 (Odd Volumes, 2015)
- Collected Poems, Vols I & II (Shearsman, 2018)
- Truth, Justice, and the Companionship of Owls (Longbarrow Press, 2019)
