= Roy Fisher =

English poet & jazz pianist (1930–2017)

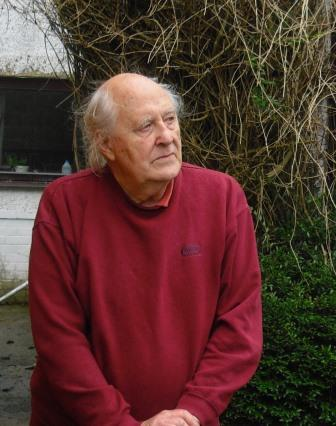
Roy Fisher (photograph by Ornella Trevisan)

Roy Fisher (11 June 1930 – 21 March 2017) was an English poet and jazz pianist. His poetry shows an openness to both European and American modernist influences, whilst remaining grounded in the experience of living in the English Midlands. Fisher has experimented with a wide range of styles throughout his long career, largely working outside of the mainstream of post-war British poetry. He has been admired by poets and critics as diverse as Donald Davie, Eric Mottram, Marjorie Perloff, Sean O’Brien, Peter Robinson, Mario Petrucci; Robert Sheppard and Gael Turnbull.

== Life ==
Roy Fisher was born in June 1930 at 74 Kentish Road, Handsworth, Birmingham, the home into which his parents had moved in 1919 and where they lived until their deaths. His mother Emma was 39 at the time of Fisher's birth. A sister and a brother preceded him. His father (Walter Fisher) was a craftsman in the jewellery trade, and the family was "poor and prudent". His parents had no political or religious affiliations, though his father was a chorister at a local church. Fisher describes the landscape of his childhood as ‘ugly’, the industrial sprawl of Smethwick to the south of Handsworth a place of danger. The grimy cityscape, the bomb damage of the war, and the industrial decline of the post-war years, these were all important influences on Fisher; but "something called Nature" was also present in his childhood, with excursions into the nearby countryside a regular aspect of family life.

Fisher went to Handsworth Grammar School. As a teenager he became interested in jazz and taught himself to play the piano. He was particularly influenced by a group of Chicago musicians including Bud Freeman, Pee Wee Russell, and the pianist Joe Sullivan. By his late teens he was playing in public with local bands.

In 1948 he went to Birmingham University to read English. After graduating and qualifying as a teacher, he taught from 1953 at the grammar school in Newton Abbot, Devon, as part of a team engaged in a radical revision of English teaching methods. In the same year Fisher married artist Barbara Venables; they were to have two children. His son Ben was Head of French at University of Bangor, and creator of one of the world's most popular narrow-gauge railway websites; his daughter Sukey is a screenwriter.

Returning to Birmingham in 1957, where he again worked as a jazz musician and began encountering, often late at night, the material that would prompt new poetry and prose, Fisher worked as a specialist Drama teacher in a primary school, moving to Dudley College of Education in 1958. In 1963, he was appointed to Bordesley College of Education in Birmingham as Principal Lecturer and Head of Department of English and Drama. In 1971, Fisher moved to Keele University where he taught in the Department of American Studies until 1982. After leaving Keele he continued to work as a writer and jazz musician, a second career he had sustained since the late 1950s playing with a number of his childhood heroes including Bud Freeman and Wild Bill Davison when they were touring Britain.

Fisher moved to Upper Hulme, Staffordshire Moorlands in 1982, and to Earl Sterndale in Derbyshire in 1986. In 1985, he was divorced from Barbara Venables Fisher, who died in 2007. His later life was characterised by bouts of depression and self-doubt, in spite of his increasing reputation and literary impact. In 1987, he married the playwright Joyce Holliday and outlived her by 15 years. He died at home on 21 March 2017, aged 86.

== Work ==
=== Early work ===
In 1954, Fisher had two short poems broadcast on the BBC by Charles Causley, and another published in a small press magazine The Window. The latter caught the eye of the poet Gael Turnbull who was putting together a British issue of the American magazine Origin, edited by Cid Corman, and he asked Fisher to contribute. Fisher and Turnbull became friends, and remained close until Turnbull's death in 2004.

Turnbull introduced Fisher to the work of American modernist poets including William Carlos Williams, Robert Creeley, Charles Olson, and Louis Zukovsky, as well as to Basil Bunting, whom he met through Turnbull. Cid Corman also provided poetry tutorials by post. In these writers Fisher encountered an aesthetic that was serious and demanding. It was this rather than any stylistic mannerism he took from them.

Publication of Fisher's work during his first ten years as a poet owed a great deal to Turnbull. Fisher's first pamphlet City (1961) was published by Turnbull's Migrant Press. The assemblage of verse and prose which makes up the text, was compiled from Fisher's notebooks by Michael Shayer, Turnbull's partner at Migrant. Fisher was dissatisfied with the pamphlet but it ‘caught people’s attention.’

A second pamphlet, Ten Interiors with Various Figures, was published by Tarasque Press in 1966, a surreal sequence of narrative poems some with quite short lines but many using a very long line close to prose. That same year Fisher also published The Ships Orchestra with Fulcrum Press, a long prose sequence again showing the influence of surrealism. The initial idea for the work came from Picasso's ‘Three Musicians’. Fisher wrote this work sequentially, each new section generated out of the preceding material. The work grows organically, following no plot, and avoiding any sense of dramatic development. The writing is often very funny and can be viewed as a verbal equivalent of the cubist technique Picasso employs in the painting.

After these publications Fisher reached an impasse and, apart from fulfilling a commission to make performance-translations of three Schubert song-cycles, wrote nothing for 5 years. In 1968 when Fulcrum published Collected Poems, bringing together all of the work Fisher wished to preserve, the poet thought he would not write again.

=== The 1970s ===
Fisher emerged from this period of blocked creativity in 1971, composing a number of prose pieces and sequences of poems. ‘The Cut Pages’ is the most radical of these 1970s works and remains Fisher's most challenging. The late sixties had been personally difficult years and Fisher kept a journal in which he recorded the ‘grisly’ details of his life. ‘The Cut Pages’ Fisher describes as an ‘exercise in self-permission’. He cut the blank pages from his notebook with a razor and started to write on them the ‘converse’ of what was in the journal – things ‘there was no constraint upon’. He continued writing until he had used up all the pages. The American critic Marjorie Perloff describes the poem as having affinities with Samuel Beckett and as an ‘unwitting precursor’ of the experiments of Ron Silliman and other Language poets a decade later. ‘The Cut Pages’ became the title sequence for a 1971 publication from Fulcrum that also contained a four further prose pieces.

Matrix was also published in 1971 by Fulcrum. The title sequence, ‘Matrix’, like a number of Fisher's poems, draws upon painting, in this case Böcklin's series of pictures called ‘The Isle of the Dead’ and Monet's late paintings of waterlilies. This volume also includes ‘Glenthorne Poems’, ‘The Six Deliberate Acts,’ and a number of collaborations with visual artists. Two of his works, ‘Correspondence’ and ‘Metamorphoses’, were illustrated by Tom Phillips and published in 1970 by Tetrad, a small London press run by artist Ian Tyson. ‘Also’ a collaboration with artist Derrick Greaves was published by Tetrad in 1972, and the same year the artist Ronald King published Bluebeard’s Castle with text by Fisher. Other collaborations with King followed over a period of twenty-five years, mostly appearing as Artist's Books and all issued by his Circle Press.

Fisher produced work steadily during the 1970s and published a further volume in 1978, The Thing About Joe Sullivan, this time with Carcanet. It was a Poetry Book Society Choice. The volume includes ‘Handsworth Liberties’, a sequence of sixteen poems written between 1974 and 1977. These poems recall images of the neighbourhood where he grew up. Fisher described the writing of these pieces as an attempt to ‘repel the invasion of landscape’ associated with childhood memories. ‘Wonders of Obligation’, composed 1979, marked a fresh development in Fisher's work, one that combines a greater freedom of movement through the compositional elements, and a further fluency and directness in both evocation and comment.

=== A Furnace ===
In 1980, Oxford University Press published Poems 1955–1980, affording Fisher's work a level of recognition it had not previously enjoyed. Six years later OUP published A Furnace, an ambitious book-length poem structured around the idea of a double spiral with a central section, ‘Core’, flanked by sections where passages move ‘in’ or ‘out’ from the core. An ‘Introit’ provides the background and context to the work. As with Fisher's other work, it is a collage of images, but here drawn from a wide range of places and historical periods. In 1980 Fisher travelled outside of Britain for the first time and A Furnace includes references to a prehistoric burial site in Brittany, to Paris, Trier, Chicago and to Ampurias in Spain. Bunting's Briggflatts is in some senses a model, though Fisher allows himself more space and the language is less compacted than in Bunting.

A further collection, Poems 1955–1987, was published by OUP in 1988, mainly collecting previous published work.

=== Later poems ===
In 1992, the poet and film maker Tom Pickard produced a documentary about Fisher with funding from the Arts Council called Birmingham’s What I Think With. Fisher wrote a sequence of poems for the film describing the city of his birth. These were published by OUP in 1994 along with other new work in a collection titled Birmingham River. The collaboration with Ronald King continued with Top Down Bottom Up published in 1989, and Anansi Company appearing in 1991. A pamphlet, It Follows That, issued by Pig Press, also appeared in 1994.

In 1996, Bloodaxe published Dow Low Drop: New and Selected Poems. Dow Low is a quarried-out hillside near Fisher's home in Derbyshire. ‘Dow Low Drop’, and the poem ‘It Follows That’ republished here, both include sections of prose, a form Fisher had not used since the 1960s.

In an interview with Peter Robinson given in 1998 Fisher questions the idea that his work has gone through distinct periods of development, and the collected poems The Long and the Short of It, published by Bloodaxe in 2005, does not present the poems in a chronological sequence. In a note at the end of the book Fisher says: ‘my habits of working on projects from time to time over long periods and my heterodox approach to the methods I use would make an arrangement that seemed chronological false: so nothing of the kind is here attempted.’

A later collection, Standard Midland, was published in 2010 by Bloodaxe, and shortlisted that year for the Costa Poetry Award. The poems were incorporated into a revised edition of The Long and the Short of It (2012). Standard Midland includes poems in various styles from lighter pieces to more characteristic work, including two enigmatic prose poems, and another of his collaborative pieces with Ronald King. A further volume, Slakki: New & Neglected Poems, was published by Bloodaxe in October 2016.

== Critical reception ==
As early as 1962, Denise Levertov–in an article published in Kultur–singled Fisher out as one of the most promising young poets in Britain. His early poems appeared in several influential anthologies: Michael Horovitz’s Children of Albion (1969), Edward Lucie-Smith’s British Poetry Since 1945 (1971) and Jon Silkin’s Poetry of the Committed Individual (1973) – all published by Penguin.

Fisher attracted the attention of a diverse range of critics and reviewers over the years. Eric Mottram, writing in Stand (1969–70) praised Fisher as an experimental modernist, while Donald Davie, in a chapter devoted to Fisher in Thomas Hardy and British Poetry (1973), claimed affinities with what he considered a native tradition. Peter Robinson has suggested that this kind of ‘dualism of approach’, with modernists and traditionalists both claiming Fisher as one of their own, has continued to the present. Fisher himself never sought to associate with any particular camp or school, and his writing during all periods of his career embraces a range of styles. Critics as diverse as Andrew Crozier, Sean O’Brien, and Marjorie Perloff have written in praise of Fisher, though from very different perspectives. This diversity of reception is certainly an issue that critics and reviewers have picked up in various ways and to various degrees, often highlighting the binary character of much of Fisher's output: for instance, reviewing Fisher's 'Selected Poems' for Poetry, poet Daisy Fried noted of the poems: "Sometimes prose, sometimes lineated, they are dense except when they aren't, restless except when still, improvisational in feel inside a kind of nonce formal rigor".

Despite the quality of his work, Fisher never enjoyed the level of celebrity accorded to some of his contemporaries. Davie says that Fisher was a victim of "the blindness and condescension of the metropolis to writing which is provincial in its origins or its subject matter". In interviews, Fisher described himself as being highly conscious of his provincial and class background. At the same time, Fisher never sought celebrity, being largely indifferent to the world of poetry prizes and media hype. While admired by many poets and dedicated poetry readers he remains largely unknown to a wider reading public.

News for the Ear: A Homage to Roy Fisher edited by Peter Robinson and Robert Sheppard appeared in 2000, as a tribute to the poet on his seventieth birthday. A volume of critical essays, The Thing About Roy Fisher, edited by John Kerrigan and Peter Robinson, was published the same year. A compendium of interviews with Fisher, Interviews Through Time, edited by Tony Fraser, also appeared in 2000, with an updated version issued in 2013.

In 2010, An Unofficial Roy Fisher edited by Peter Robinson was published in celebration of the poet's eightieth birthday. This book includes work by Fisher not collected elsewhere, as well as tributes from other poets and commentary on his work. The work also includes an update to the invaluable bibliography published in The Thing About Roy Fisher, compiled by Derek Slade.

In 2003, Fisher was made lifetime Honorary Poet of the City of Birmingham. He was elected a Fellow of the Royal Society of Literature in 2005 and was shortlisted for the 2012 Ted Hughes Award. He had already gained a Cholmondeley Award in 1981, and in 2010 poet and radio broadcaster Ian McMillan chose Fisher's selected poems, The Long and the Short of It, as his Desert Island book, describing its author as "Britain’s greatest living poet".

== Bibliography ==
- City (Migrant Press, 1961)
- Ten Interiors with Various Figures (Tarasque Press, 1966)
- The Memorial Fountain (Northern House, 1966)
- The Ship’s Orchestra (Fulcrum Press, 1966)
- Collected Poems (Fulcrum Press, 1968)
- Matrix (Fulcrum Press, 1971)
- Three Early Pieces (Trans Gravity Advertiser, Publication 3, 1971)
- The Cut Pages (Fulcrum Press, 1971; Shearsman, 1986)
- Nineteen Poems and an Interview (Grossteste Press, 1975; 1977)
- The Thing About Joe Sullivan: Poems 1971–1977 (Carcanet Press, 1978)
- Poems 1955–1980 (Oxford University Press, 1980)
- Talks For Words (Blackweir Press, 1980)
- A Furnace (Oxford University Press, 1986)
- Poems 1955–1987 (Oxford University Press, 1988)
- Birmingham River (Oxford University Press, 1994)
- It Follows That (Pig Press, 1994)
- The Dow Low Drop: New & Selected Poems (Bloodaxe Books, 1996)
- The Long and the Short of It: Poems 1955–2005 (Bloodaxe Books, 2005)
- Standard Midland (Bloodaxe Books, 2010)
- Selected Poems ed. August Kleinzahler (Flood Editions, US, 2010)
- The Long and the Short of It: Poems 1955–2010 (Bloodaxe Books, 2012)
- An Easily Bewildered Child: Occasional Prose 1963–2013, ed. Peter Robinson (Shearsman, 2014)
- Slakki: New & Neglected Poems, ed. Peter Robinson (Bloodaxe Books, 2016)
- A Furnace, ed. Peter Robinson (Flood Editions, US, 2018)
- The Citizen and the making of City, ed. Peter Robinson (Bloodaxe Books, 2022)
