= Adam Horovitz =

Adam Horovitz may refer to:

- Ad-Rock (born 1966), stage name of Adam Horovitz of the Beastie Boys
- Adam Horovitz (poet) (born 1971), British poet

== See also ==
- Adam Horowitz, screenwriter and producer
- Adam Horowitz (journalist), co-editor of Mondoweiss
- Horovitz (surname)
