= Peter Armstrong (poet) =

English poet

Peter Armstrong (born in 1957) is an English poet and psychotherapist. He was born in County Durham and now lives in Northumberland.

== Life ==
Armstrong was born in Blaydon, County Durham, and educated at local schools. He then read philosophy and English at Sunderland Polytechnic (now the University of Sunderland). While there he was converted from Roman Catholicism to Evangelical Protestantism, but more recently has described himself as an "Anglo-Catholic agnostic". He trained as a teacher, but then turned to psychiatric nursing, and now works as a cognitive behavioural psychotherapist. He lives in Stocksfield, Northumberland.

== Poetry ==
Armstrong began to publish his poetry in the late 1970s, contributing to magazines and to Ten North-East Poets, The Firebox. Poetry in Britain and Ireland after 1945, and Last Words: New Poetry for the New Century, and other collections. He won an Eric Gregory Award from the Society of Authors in 1984. His first volume of poetry, Risings, appeared in 1988; three others have followed.

Armstrong is one of the editors of the Newcastle-based magazine Other Poetry, which was revived in 1995 and appears three times a year. He also belongs to the Northern Poets' Workshop. His work is marked by preoccupations with religion and the landscape – of his native North-East, but also of the Hebrides and of a notional America drawn from road movies and cigarette advertising. His verse has been influenced more recently by his work as a cognitive therapist.

== Bibliography ==
Source: British Library Integrated Catalogue:

- Risings, Petersfield: Enitharmon, 1988 ISBN 1-870612-00-0)
- The Red-Funnelled Boat, London: Picador, 1998 ISBN 0-330-36914-8)
- The Capital of Nowhere, London: Picador, 2003 ISBN 0-330-41267-1)
- Madame Noire (and other figures at the edge of an imagined war), Nottingham: Shoestring, 2008 ISBN 1-904886-74-4)

== Namesakes ==
Five poems by another Peter Armstrong (born 1939) appeared in 1969 in the anthology Children of Albion: Poetry of the Underground in Britain, edited by Michael Horovitz and dedicated to Allen Ginsberg. They were taken from the booklet 28 Poems (Bristol: View Publications, 1966).

Otterburn 1388. Bloody Border Conflict by Peter Armstrong (Illustrated by Stephen Walsh. Oxford: Osprey, 2006. ISBN 1-84176-980-0) tells the story of a medieval battle between England and Scotland.
