= Peter Finch (poet) =

Welsh writer (born 1947)

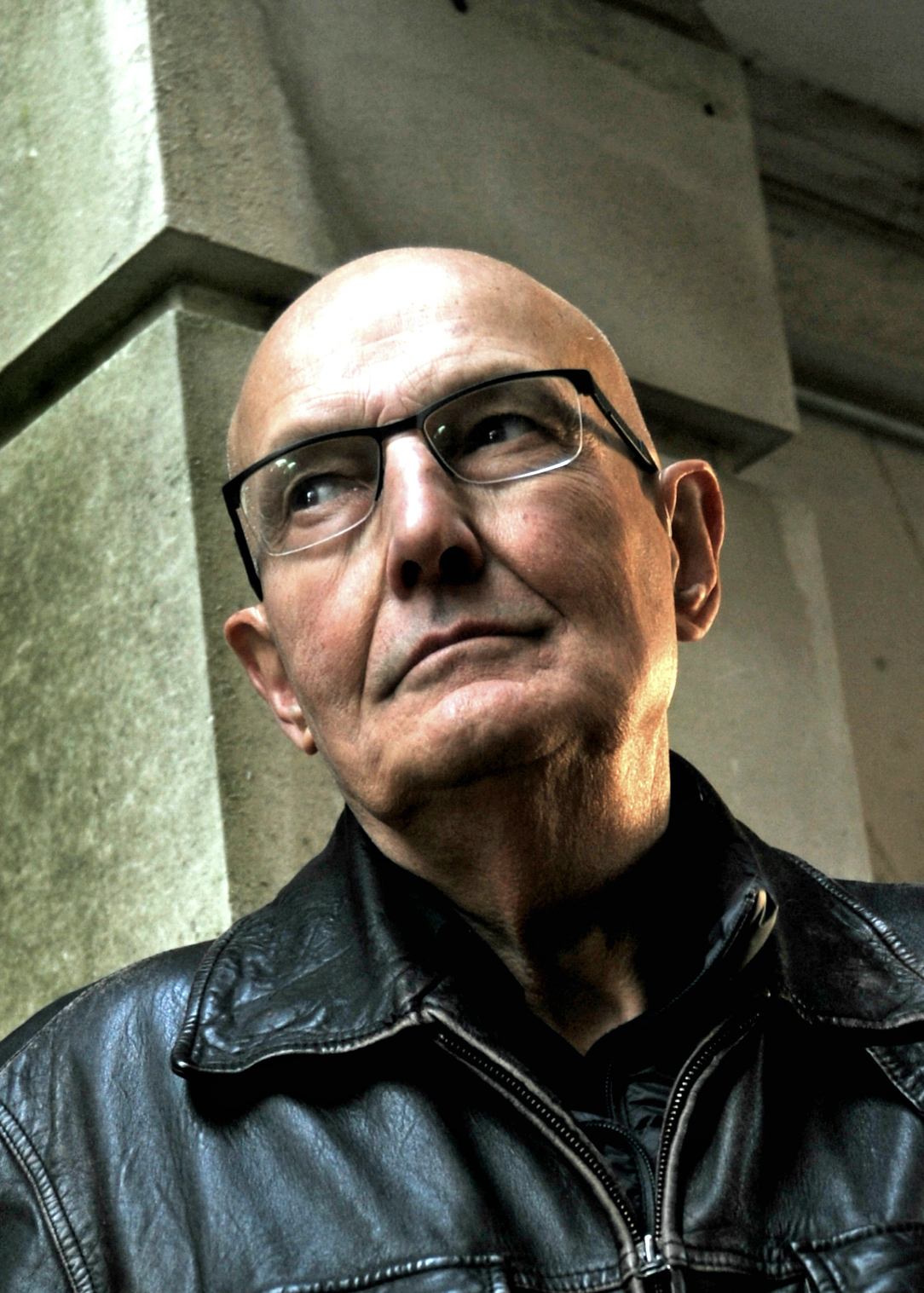
- Born: March 1947 (age 78–79) Cardiff, Wales
- Occupation: Author, psychogeographer and poet
- Genre: Poetry
- Notable works: The literary magazine Second Aeon (founder)

Peter Finch (born 1947) is a Welsh author, psychogeographer and poet living in Cardiff, Wales.

== Early life ==
Finch was born in Cardiff, Wales, in March 1947, son of Stanley and Marjorie Finch, a post-office worker and a telephonist. He attended school in the city and took up his first job as a trainee local government accountant at Glamorgan County Council in 1963.

He began reading and writing poetry after hearing a recording of Allen Ginsberg reading Howl and then buying a copy of the City Lights edition of this work at Cardiff's SPCK (Society for the Promotion of Christian Knowledge) Bookshop in the Friary. Finch's early work appeared in small magazines such as Poet's Platform, Breakthru and Viewpoints. In 1964, he heard Howlin' Wolf and other performers at the American Negro Blues Festival at Colston Hall, Bristol. There, he met the bass player and performer Willie Dixon and tried to interest him in his home-grown south Wales blues lyrics. He failed.

== Second Aeon ==
In 1966, Finch founded the literary magazine Second Aeon, which ran for 21 issues, until 1974. The magazine grew in both content and stature to become the leading alternative lit magazine of the day. Peter Barry called it "The most prominent and best established avant-garde poetry magazine of the period". The magazine generated its own publication series, which ran to 80 titles and included works by Peter Redgrove, Kent Taylor, Geraint Jarman, William Wantling, Bob Cobbing, Doug Blazek, D. M. Thomas and John Tripp. In 1968, Finch founded No Walls, a weekly poetry reading series that ran until 1970. Eighteen issues of the reading series' magazine The No Walls Broadsheet were published. In 1976, at the height of the Poetry Wars, he was offered the editorship of the London Poetry Society's The Poetry Review, a post he did not accept.

== 1970s and experimental poetry ==
During the 1970s, with Second Aeon magazine at its height, Finch became deeply involved with experimental, concrete, sound and visual poetry. He had met Bob Cobbing in London and had been drawn to the innovative often anarchic styles practised in the capital. Finch became treasurer of the Association of Little Presses (ALP), the Welsh representative of Poet's Conference, the poets trade union, and a council member of the Poetry Society in Earl's Court.

In Wales, he had been elected a member of the English Section of Yr Academi Gymreig, the Welsh Academy, the august association of writers, and was regarded by some as its an enfant terrible.

His work, often in the form of extended sound poetry innovations, was performed at venues throughout the UK. His visual poetry was exhibited in the company of Peter Mayer, dsh, Cobbing and others, both in the UK and further afield. He was awarded a Welsh Arts Council bursary for visual poetry. The University of California exhibited both his concrete poetry and Second Aeon magazine artefacts.

Richard Kostelanetz called him "the principal innovator in Welsh poetry... Finch has favored a variety of tight sober structures, including parodies of other poets, visual poems, sound poems, and verbal imitations of Philip Glass' music... Finch deserves a Welsh knighthood".

== The Oriel bookshop: 1973–1998 ==
Following his appointment in 1973 Finch managed the Welsh Arts Council's Oriel bookshop, a specialist bilingual (English and Welsh) arts and poetry retailer for twenty-five years. This included the original first-floor operation in Charles Street, Cardiff, until 1989, the more commercial shop on the ground floor at The Friary until 1997 and, briefly, as manager of the HMSO Oriel take-over until 1998. The shop became a centre for writers, small publishers, innovators, poets and performers. It was a home to Welsh-language culture in the capital as well as a venue for numerous poetry readings and other literary events. Everyone from R. S. Thomas to Lawrence Ferlinghetti, Jackson Mac Low to Simon Armitage and Margaret Atwood to Derek Walcott read at the premises. The ALP mounted bookfairs. Writers groups gathered.

== How to get published ==
Informed by his experience as a magazine editor, a performing and published poet and then a bookseller, Finch wrote and published a number of highly successful guides. His Getting Your Poetry Published, first brought out by the Association of Little Presses in 1973, ran to 15 editions with many thousands of copies in print. His How to Publish Your Poetry (Allison & Busby, 1985), How to Publish Yourself (Allison & Busby, 1987) and The Poetry Business (Seren, 1994) all ran to multiple editions. Between 1989 and 2007, he compiled the poetry section for Macmillan's trade guidebook The Writer's Handbook. Between 1990 and 2018, he compiled the self-publishing section for A & C Black's Writers' and Artists' Yearbook.

== 1980s and performance poetry ==
During the 1980s, and with a background in sonic innovation and the stretching of the poetry voice, Finch was at the forefront of the emerging performance poetry scene. Following on from the founding work of poet Chris Torrance, Finch joined Cabaret 246 and then, with poets Topher Mills and Ifor Thomas, the trio Horses Mouth. The work here involved innovative use of props and owed as much to theatre as it did to traditional literary performance. The need to entertain became a driver.

== Academi and Literature Wales ==
In 1998, Finch left the Oriel Bookshop to head Academi, the new Welsh National Literature Promotion Agency and Society of Writers developed from the old Welsh Academy (Yr Academi Gymreig) and funded by the Welsh Government. This organisation had the job of promoting and developing literature throughout the country. Finch considerably expanded bursary provision, visits of writers to schools, prisons, and deprived communities, literary tours, readings, festivals and other provisions. At the Wales Millennium Centre, he created the Glyn Jones Centre. This was a writer's library and drop-in advice centre developed with a legacy from the great Anglo-Welsh writer. He put the annual Wales Book of the Year prize onto a visible and celebratory footing; created the role of Welsh National Poet; and helped smooth the way for innovations such as the poet Gwyneth Lewis' bilingual words built across the frontage of the Wales Millennium Centre. In 2001, he guest-edited a Welsh edition of the US magazine Slope, which provided a bi-lingual snapshot of just what was happening in poetry in Wales at the turn of the millennium.

== Later life and work ==
In the new millennium, Finch worked on psychogeographies and alternative guides to his native city of Cardiff. His first book of this genre, Real Cardiff, which appeared in 2002, was successful enough to generate three follow-ups and a whole series of Real books covering mainly urban areas throughout the UK. These are written by a range of authors (including Grahame Davies and Patrick McGuinness). There are 25 in the series to date. Finch acts as series editor. Finch has also written on popular music (The Roots of Rock – 2016), the Severn Estuary (Edging the Estuary – 2013) and has produced innovative walking guides to both Cardiff and its valleys with the photographer John Briggs.

In 2022, with the assistance of editor Andrew Taylor, Finch published two volumes comprising 1,000 pages of his Collected Poems. These books have been well received. He has recently published a new chapbook of 14 poems, Just When You Think It's Over – It Starts Again, with the small DIY, punk, handmade publisher in New Jersey, Between Shadows Press. In early 2025 Seren brought out There's Everything To Play For - The Poetry of Peter Finch, a critical overview of Finch's work from Andrew Taylor.

In 2025 he published The Literary Business, a personal ramble around the book world. Over the past 60 years Finch had seen the business from all sides. This is his report on what he found.

In 2026 in the series Among The Neighbors the State University of New York at Buffalo published a monograph on the magazine Second Aeon written by Finch. This volume contains a detailed consideration on the success of the magazine along with a comprehensive bibliographical list of all issues and all attendant publications.

== Work in the public realm ==
Finch has four pieces associated with public artworks on show in the built environment of Cardiff. These include Ysbwriel (2002) as part of Jeroen Van Western's Breathing In Time Out across the top of the Lamby Way landfill site; sections of R S Thomas Information (2003) which have been incorporated onto the exterior and interior of the BT Internet Data Centre in Cardiff Bay; L'Alliance (2010) as part of Jean-Bernard Metais public artwork in The Hayes, Cardiff; and The Ballast Bank (2011) as part of Renn & Thacker's The Blue Light outside Butetown Police Station in Cardiff Bay.

== Bibliography ==
No.	Name	Published	Publisher	Notes
1	Wanted for Writing Poetry	1968	Second Aeon	with Stephen Morris
2	An Alteration in the Way I Breathe	1969	Quickest Way Out	
3	Pieces of the Universe	1969	Second Aeon	
4	Beyond the Silence	1970	Vertigo	
5	Circle of the Suns	1970	Art Living	
6	The Edge of Tomorrow	1971	BB Books	with Jeanne Rushton
7	The End of the Vision	1971	John Jones Ltd	
8	Blats	1972	Second Aeon	
9	Typewriter Poems	1972	Something Else Press	editor
10	Whitesung	1972	Aquila	
11	Antarktika	1973	Writers Forum	
12	Getting Your Poetry Published	1973	Association of Little Presses	
13	Trowch Eich Radio 'Mlaen	1977	Writers Forum	
14	Green Horse	1978	Christopher Davies	co-edited with Meic Stephens
15	How to Learn Welsh	1978	Christopher Davies	editor
16	Connecting Tubes	1980	Writers Forum	
17	Blues and Heartbreakers	1981	Galloping Dogs	
18	The O Poems	1981	Writers Forum	
19	Visual Texts 1970–1980	1981	Pyrofiche	microfiche edition
20	Between 35 and 42	1982	Alun Books	
21	On Criticism	1984	Writers Forum	
22	Some Music and a Little War	1984	Rivelin Grapheme	
23	How to Publish Your Poetry	1985	Allison & Busby	re-issued 1998
24	Reds in the Bed	1985	Galloping Dog	
25	How to Publish Yourself	1987	Allison & Busby	re-issued 1997
26	Selected Poems	1987	Poetry Wales Press	
27	Cheng Man Ch'ing Variations	1990	Writers Forum	
28	Make	1990	Galloping Dog	
29	Publishing Yourself, Not Too Difficult After All	1990	Association of Little Presses	
30	Poems for Ghosts	1991	Seren	
31	Five Hundred Cobbings	1994	Writers Forum	
32	The Poetry Business	1994	Seren	
33	The Spe ell	1995	Writers Forum	
34	Small Presses & Little Magazines of the UK and Ireland, An Address List	1996	Oriel Bookshop	compiler
35	Antibodies	1997	Stride	
36	Dauber	1997	Writers Forum	
37	Useful	1997	Seren	
38	Food	2001	Seren	
39	Real Cardiff	2002	Seren	
40	Vizet – Water	2003	Konkret Konyvek	
41	Real Cardiff 2	2004	Seren	
42	The Big Book of Cardiff	2005	Seren	co-edited with Grahame Davies
43	Welsh Poems	2006	Shearsman	
44	Selected Later Poems'	2007	Seren	
45	Real Wales	2008	Seren	
46	Real Cardiff 3	2009	Seren	
47	The Insufficiency of Christian Teaching on the Subject of Common Emotional Problems	2011	Smallminded Books	
48	hammer lieder helicopter speak	2012	unit4art	
49	Edging the Estuary	2013	Seren	
50	The Roots of Rock From Cardiff To Mississippi And Back	2016	Seren	
51	Real Cardiff 4 – The Flourishing City	2018	Seren	
52	Walking Cardiff	2019	Seren	with John Briggs
53	The Machineries of Joy	2020	Seren	
54	Collected Poems Volume 1	2022	Seren	edited by Andrew Taylor
55	Collected Poems Volume 2	2022	Seren	edited by Andrew Taylor
56	Edging The City	2022	Seren	
57	Just When You Think It's Over – It Starts Again	2022	Between Shadows Press	edited by Tohm Bakelas
58	There's Everything To Play For - The Poetry of Peter Finch	2025	Seren	Andrew Taylor's comprehensive study
59	The Literary Business	2025	Parthian Books	a report from the front line
60	Second Aeon - The International Poetry Avant-Garde Meets the British Poetry Revival 1966-1975	2026	Among The Neighbors #30 - The Poetry Collection of the University Libraries, University at Buffalo, The State University of New York, Buffalo, New York	Peter Finch authored illustrated monograph
