= Robert Sheppard =

Robert Sheppard may refer to:

- Robert Sheppard (poet), British poet and critic
- Robert Sheppard (cricketer), English cricketer
- Robert Carl Sheppard, lighthouse keeper and master mariner
- Bob Sheppard (Robert Leo Sheppard), American sports public address announcer
- Bob Sheppard (musician), American jazz musician
- Rob Sheppard, American college baseball coach

== See also ==
- Robert Shepherd, professor of law
- Robert Shepherd (footballer), Australian rules footballer
