= Douglas Oliver =

English poet, novelist, editor, and educator

Douglas Dunlop Oliver (14 September 1937 – 21 April 2000) was a poet, novelist, editor, and educator. The author of more than a dozen works, Oliver came into poetry not as an academic but through a career in journalism, notably in Cambridge, Paris, and Coventry, before attending the University of Essex in the 1970s. He received a B.A. (literature) in 1975 and an M.A. (applied linguistics) in 1982. Oliver subsequently lived in Brightlingsea, Paris, New York, and again Paris, usually working as a lecturer.

== Biography ==
Oliver was born in 1937 in Southampton, Hampshire as the youngest of three children, and subsequently grew up near Bournemouth in the town of Branksome. His parents, Athole and Marjorie Oliver, were Scottish Presbyterians. Having left school at fifteen, Oliver did his national service as a clerk in the RAF School of Cookery and then found his way into provincial journalism. He became a journalist first in Coventry and then in Cambridge, and was a staff reporter on the Cambridge Evening News.

"A poet of modern Paris has to write about more than the river mists ..., More than midway through my life I have begun writing Arrondissements, a series of books, or long sequences in poetry and prose, designed to reflect the world at large through the prism of Paris."

Douglas Oliver

In 1962 he married Janet Hughes. They had two daughters, Kate and Bonamy, and a son, Tom. They moved to Cambridge in about 1968. It was there that Oliver formed some ties with a group of poets with connections to The English Intelligencer and the Ferry and Grosseteste presses: part of the group vaguely associated with J. H. Prynne which today is acknowledged as an important epicenter of innovative poetry in the United Kingdom. These poets subsequently became known as the Cambridge poets. At this time, Oliver's own poems began to be published.

In 1970, the family moved to Paris where Oliver worked for Agence France-Presse. Upon his return to England, Oliver took his place as a student at Essex University, which had also become a gathering place for poets. Significantly, it was there that he befriended the American poets Ted Berrigan (1934–1983) and Alice Notley.

During the 1970s and 1980s, Oliver continued to lecture, teach, edit and write. His first marriage dissolved in 1987. Eventually Oliver moved to New York and in February 1988 married Alice Notley who had two sons with Ted Berrigan: Edmund and Anselm Berrigan (both of whom, subsequently, have become established writers themselves). In 1992, Oliver returned to Paris, and lived there with Notley until his death from prostate cancer. According to John Hall, it was during this phase of his life that Oliver was working mostly on Arrondissements.

== Selected bibliography ==
- Oppo Hectic, Ferry Press (London), 1969.
- The Harmless Building, Ferry Press, 1973, revised edition published in Three Variations on the Theme of Harm (also see below), 1990.
- In the Cave of Suicession, Street Editions (Cambridge), 1974.
- The Diagram Poems, Ferry Press, 1979.
- The Infant and the Pearl, Silver Hounds Press (London), 1985.
- Kind (collected poems), Allardyce, Barnett (Sussex), 1987.
- Poetry and Narrative in Performance, St. Martin's Press (New York City), 1989.
- Three Variations on the Theme of Harm (selected fiction and poetry), Paladin (London), 1990.
- Penniless Politics (also see below), Hoarse Commerce (London), 1991.
- (With wife, Alice Notley) The Scarlet Cabinet (includes "Penniless Politics", "Nava Sutra", and novel "Sophia Scarlett"), Scarlet Editions (New York City), 1992.
- (With Iain Sinclair and Denise Riley) Penguin Modern Poets 10, Penguin (London), 1996.
- Selected Poems, Talisman House (Jersey City, NJ), 1996.
- A Salvo for Africa, Bloodaxe (Newcastle upon Tyne, England), 2000.
- "27 Uncollected Poems" in A Meeting for Douglas Oliver (edited by Wendy Mulford and Peter Riley) Cambridge: infernal methods, Street Editions and Poetical Histories, 2002.
- Arrondissements (edited by Alice Notley), Great Wilbraham: Salt Publishing, 2003.
- Whisper ‘Louise’: A double historical memoir and meditation, Hastings: Reality Street, 2005.

=== Translations ===
- Albiach, Anne-Marie. Mezza Voce (1984); English translation by Joseph Simas in collaboration with Oliver, Anthony Barnett, & Lydia Davis (Sausalito, CA: Post-Apollo Press, 1988) ISBN 0-942996-11-9
