= Nicholas Snowdon Willey =

Nicholas Snowdon Willey also spelt Nicholas Snowden Willey (1946-2011) was an English poet.

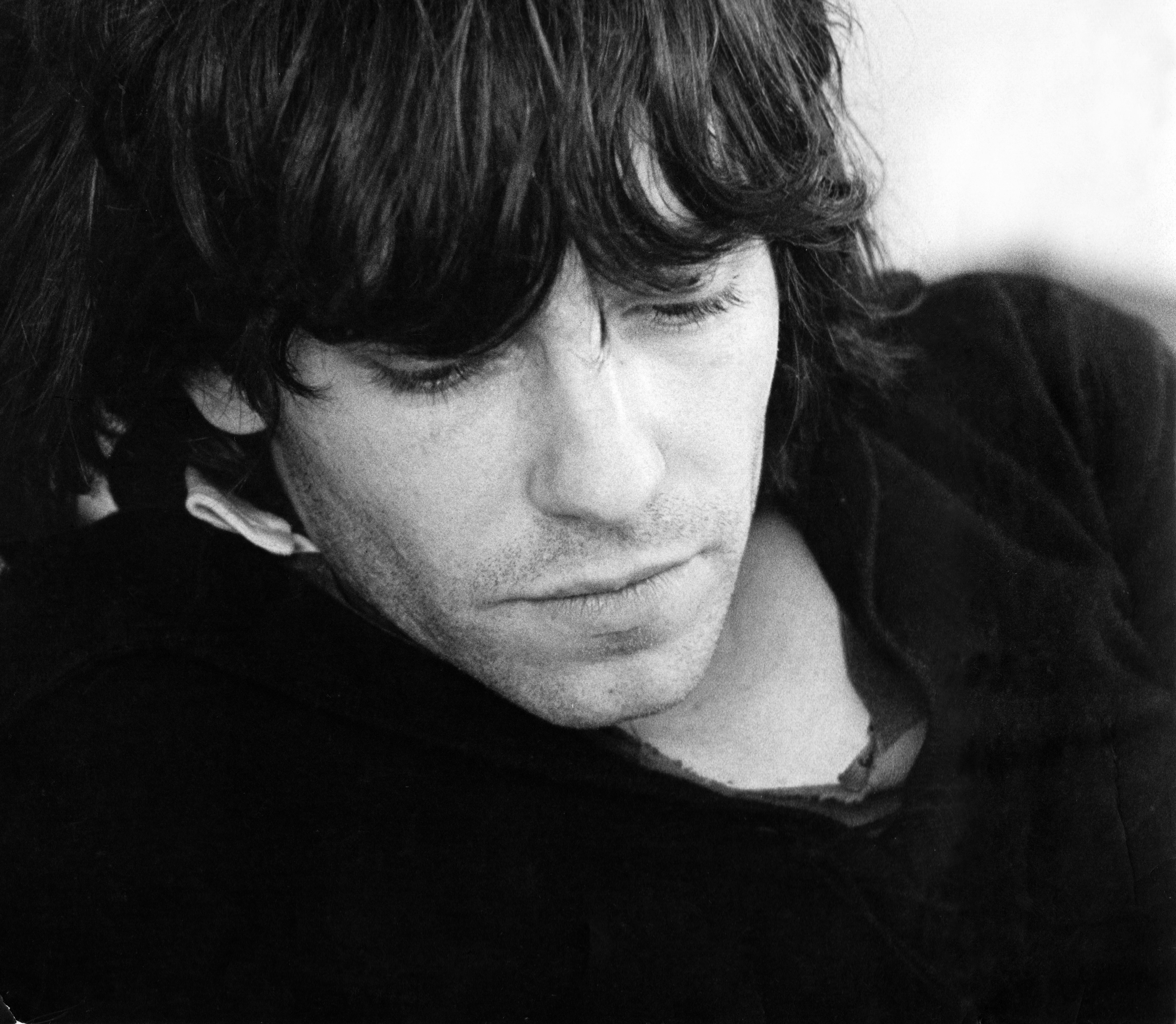
Portrait of Nick Snowdon Willey circa 1968

== Early life and education ==
Nicholas Snowdon Willey was born in London on 21 February 1946, to Fred Willey and Eleanor née Snowdon. Fred Willey was Labour Party MP for Sunderland North in the 1945 Labour Government. Both parents came from County Durham. He was educated at University College School, Hampstead, and later at King Alfred School. He started writing poetry at an early age, an activity which continued until his death.

In 1962 at the age of sixteen he had the first of a series of serious depressions, and spent most of that year in hospital. The illness was never to be far away throughout his life.

== Poetry ==
Willey's work was included in the seminal anthology of beat poets by Michael Horovitz, Children of Albion: Poetry of the Underground in Britain. His work however does not (as he himself considered) lend itself usefully to definition beyond that of poetry itself. He had a profound understanding of the sonorous meaning of poetry, and was a fine reader of his work. A small number of recordings of him are held in the British Library.

The earliest publication of his poetry was The Green Tunnel (Signals Press 1965), a hard-back collection of twenty poems including one especially written to celebrate a London exhibition by Takis entitled "L'espace Interieur". A pamphlet of seven poems, Seven Poems (Villiers Press 1974) also appeared, and both publications are now unobtainable. His poems also appeared regularly in a number of magazines, including Encounter magazine and more recently Ambit. A collection of forty of his early poems, "Liminal Green", (Light Touch Publications 2019) with a CD of readings by Joss Wynne Evans is recently published.

In June 1969 the BBC Third Programme transmitted a reading of Willey's poetry entitled "The Living Poet - Nicholas Willey" introduced by Hallam Tennyson.

== Personal life ==
In 1973, he met his future wife Sarah at a time when he had been working happily for quite a long period at the Play Library at the BBC. Upon marriage they moved to the West Country eventually settling in a cottage in Wiltshire. There were two children of the marriage, a son, Matt, born in Bristol 1974 and a daughter, Jane born in Bath, Somerset 1977. Also during that period he took a degree in Philosophy at Bristol University.

In later years Willey worked with deaf and blind adults, and also for several years with young adults with learning difficulties.

He died of cancer on 20 November 2011.
