= David Chaloner =

English poet and designer

David Chaloner (18 October 1944 – 10 May 2010) was an English poet associated with the British Poetry Revival, and a prominent British designer.

== Life ==
Chaloner was born in Mottram St Andrew in Cheshire. He attended Broken Cross community school in Macclesfield, left at 15, and had a successful career as a designer beginning in 1960. He ran his own design business and later worked as retail design director with the Conran Group (1995–2004), becoming interior and retail design director of Conran and Partners (2004–2006). He ran the design firm Chaloner Huisman of Amsterdam with Jane Huisman. He was a British Council design ambassador and a judge for the British Design Week awards. His early poetry appeared in anthologies and magazines including The English Intelligencer and the 1960s classic underground anthology Children of Albion, edited by Michael Horovitz. His later more ambitious work was published by leading independent presses in England and America, including Andrew Crozier's Ferry Press and Rosmarie and Keith Waldrop's Burning Deck. A substantial selection was included in A Various Art (Carcanet, 1987) and more recently in Vanishing Points (Salt, 2004). He edited and published One, a magazine of new writing (1971–81). His Collected Poems was published in 2005 and there is a published interview with Andrew Duncan in Don't Start Me Talking. He was married to Mary in 1968 and their daughter is Lucy Chaloner.

== Bibliography ==
- dark pages / slow turns / brief salves, London: Ferry, 1969
- Year of Meteors, Gillingham, UK: Arc, 1972
- Chocolate Sauce, London: Ferry, 1973
- Projections, Providence, RI: Burning Deck, 1977
- Today Backwards, London: Many, 1977
- Fading into Brilliance, London: Oasis, 1978
- Hotel Zingo, Wirksworth, UK: Grosseteste, 1981
- Trans, Newcastle upon Tyne, UK: Galloping Dog, 1989
- The Edge, Cambridge, UK: Equipage, 1993
- Art for Others, Cambridge: Equipage, 1998
- Delight's Wreckage, Kentisbeare, UK: Shearsman and London: Oasis, 2001
- Collected Poems, Cambridge: Salt, 2005
