= Robert Shepherd (footballer) =

Australian rules footballer

Personal information
- Full name: Robert Shepherd
- Born: 10 February 1956 (age 70)
- Original team: Western Districts
- Height: 180 cm (5 ft 11 in)
- Weight: 73 kg (161 lb)

Playing career^{1}
Years	Club	Games (Goals)
1975–1977	Fitzroy	43 (31)
- ^{1} Playing statistics correct to the end of 1977.

Robert Shepherd (born 10 February 1956) is a former Australian rules footballer who played with Fitzroy in the Victorian Football League (VFL) during the 1970s.

Shepherd played his junior football with Sherwood and then joined Western Districts in the Queensland Australian Football League. He had been a gifted player in his youth, voted the best performer at the 1972 schoolboy carnival and named vice-captain of the All-Australian team.

His career at Fitzroy began in 1975 when as a 19-year-old he became a regular fixture in the team with 16 appearances. He added 27 games over the next two seasons, averaging 19 disposals in the latter year.

A half forward, he returned to Western Districts when his Fitzroy stint ended and in 1980 was joint runner-up in the Grogan Medal. It was the second time he had finished second in the Grogan Medal count, having lost out to Jeff Ebert in 1974.
