= Andrew Crozier =

British poet (1943–2008)

Andrew Thomas Knights Crozier (26 July 1943 – 3 April 2008) was a poet associated with the British Poetry Revival.

== Life ==
Crozier was educated at Dulwich College, and later Christ's College, Cambridge. His 1976 book Pleats won the Alice Hunt Bartlett Prize, awarded jointly that year with Lee Harwood. He was co-editor of the important Revival magazine The English Intelligencer and for many years ran Ferry Press, an independent poetry publisher that issued books by Anthony Barnett, David Chaloner, Douglas Oliver, J. H. Prynne, Peter Riley, and others. With Tim Longville he edited the influential anthology A Various Art. He also edited the poems of Carl Rakosi and John Rodker. His collected poems, All Where Each Is was published in 1985. Crozier was Professor of Prose at the University of Sussex, where his research interests were listed as English and American poetry and poetics, with special reference to the romantic and modern periods.

Andrew Crozier died from a brain tumour on 3 April 2008.

== Bibliography ==
- Loved Litter of Time Spent, Buffalo, NY: Sum Books, 1967
- Train Rides, Pampisford, UK: R Books, 1968
- Walking on Grass, London: Ferry Press, 1969
- In One Side & Out the Other (with John James & Tom Phillips), London: Ferry Press, 1970
- Neglected Information, Sidcup, UK: Blacksuede Boot Press, 1972
- The Veil Poem, Providence, RI: Burning Deck, 1974
- Printed Circuit, Cambridge, UK: Street Editions, 1974
- Seven Contemporary Sun Dials (with Ian Potts), Brighton, UK: Brighton Festival, 1975
- Pleats, Bishops Stortford, UK: Great Works Editions, 1975
- Residing, Belper, UK: Aggie Weston's, 1976
- Duets, Guildford, UK: Circle Press, 1976
- High Zero, Cambridge, UK: Street Editions, 1978
- Were There, London: Many Press, 1978
- Utamaro Variations (with Ian Tyson), London: Tetrad, 1982
- All Where Each Is, London: Allardyce, Barnett, 1985
- A Various Art (co-edited with Tim Longville), Manchester, UK: Carcanet, 1987
- Star Ground, Lewes, UK: Silver Hounds, 2008
- "Free Verse" as Formal Restraint, Bristol: Shearsman, 2015
