= Jim Burns (poet) =

English poet, writer and magazine editor

Jim Burns is an English poet, writer and magazine editor. He was born in Preston, Lancashire, in 1936.

Burns was educated at Preston Grammar School, worked in mills, and joined the army in 1954. While stationed in Germany, Burns developed a love of jazz and of American writers, accessible through American Forces Network radio and through bookshops stocking new literature for American service personnel. After leaving the army in 1957, he returned to Preston and sought out new writers filtering through to Britain, travelling to Manchester and London to explore those experimental bookshops which stocked the more difficult-to-find ones.

Burns had his first poems published in New Voice magazine in 1962, and soon began writing for and about small poetry magazines in a range of publications including The Guardian, Tribune and Ambit. Several books of his poetry have been published, including two volumes of his selected works.

In 1964, Burns launched Move, a poetry magazine featuring British and North American writers (including Chris Torrance, Larry Eigner, Lee Harwood, Bill Deemer, Michael Horovitz, Earle Birney, Dave Cunliffe and Tina Morris) which ran for eight issues (it folded in 1968): it was part of the British poetry revival, lauded beyond the traditional audience of middle class intellectuals in London, Oxford and Cambridge. Burns contributed poetry to many other magazines, and literary reviews and articles to The Guardian, Tribune and New Society. Perhaps his most important contributions were bringing the world of small poetry magazines to a wider audience through regular reviews and columns, and in particular spreading his knowledge of those lesser known North American writers who he felt deserved greater attention.

When the editor of Palantir poetry magazine (published through Preston Polytechnic) stepped down, Burns took over from issue number 3 in May 1976; this gave him the opportunity to direct attention to writers he felt deserved more support. Working on Palantir through to the final (23rd) issue in 1983, he included work from many leading poets (for example, Gael Turnbull, Wes Magee and Edwin Brock), and wrote about the lesser known beat poets.

As of 2014, Burns continues to write on jazz, literature and politics, and has published several essay collections including Beats, Bohemians & Intellectuals (Trent Books, 2000), Radicals, Beats & Beboppers (Penniless Press, 2011) and Artists, Beats & Cool Cats (Penniless Press, 2014).

== Bibliography ==
A Way of Looking at Things, Move Publications, 1964

Two for Our Time, Screeches, 1964

Some Poems, Crank Books (NY), 1965

Some More Poems, R Books, 1966

The Summer Season, Target Publications, 1966

My Sad Story & Other Poems, New Voice, 1967

Cells: Prose Pieces, Grosseteste Press, 1967

Saloon Bar: Three Jim Burns Stories, Ferry Press, 1967

The Store of Things, Phoenix Pamphlets, 1969

Types: Prose Pieces and Poems, Second Aeon, 1970

A Single Flower, Andium Press, 1972

Leben in Preston, Palmenpresse (GFR), 1973

Easter in Stockport, Rivelin Press, 1975

Fred Engels in Woolworths, Oasis Books, 1975

Playing it Cool, Galloping Dog Press, 1976

The Goldfish Speaks from Beyond the Grave, Salamander, 1976

Fred Engels bei Woolworth, Rotbuch Verlag (GFR), 1977

Catullus in Preston, Cameo Club Alley Press, 1979

Aristotle’s Grill, Platform Poets, 1979

Notes from a Greasy Spoon, Uni College Cardiff, 1980

Internal Memorandum, Rivelin Press, 1982

Notizen Von Einem Schmierigen Loffel, Palmenpresse (GFR), 1982

Gestures, (cassette) Black Sheep Recording Co., 1982

The Real World, Purple Heather Press, 1986

Out of the Past: Selected Poems 1961-1986, Rivelin Grapheme, 1987

Poems for Tribune, Wide Skirt Press, 1988

The Gift, Redbeck Press, 1989

Confessions of an Old believer, Redbeck Press, 1996

Beware of Men in Suits, Incline Press, 1996

As Good A Reason As Any, Redbeck Press, 1999

The Five Senses, Incline Press, 1999

Take it Easy, Redbeck Press, 2003

Bopper, Ragged Edge, 2004

Germany and all that Jazz, Ragged Edge, 2005

Short Statements, Redbeck Press, 2006

Laying Something Down, Shoestring Press, 2007

Cool Kerouac, Beat Scene Press, 2008

What I Said, Eyelet Books, 2008

Streetsinger, Shoestring Press, 2010
