= Barry Tebb =

Barry Tebb is an English poet, publisher and author. He was born in Leeds, West Riding of Yorkshire in 1942.

== Early career ==
Tebb studied English at the Leeds Training College 1961-1964 and while there ... "read widely, Proust, Firbank, Dickens, Ginsberg, Sartre, Kierkegaard, and of course, The New Poetry (Plath, Lowell and Berryman)" He and taught at Wyther Park Primary School 1964–67. At the University of Leeds he mixed with Gregory Fellows in Poetry including Martin Bell, Peter Redgrove, Jon Silkin and David Wright. The Gregory fellowship awards were set up by Eric Craven Gregory to encourage young artists.

His poetry was being printed in Peace News and The Poetry Review and he was first published by Alan Tarling's 'Poet and Printer Press' ( -1996) in the sixties'. His first collection was praised by John Carey in the New Statesman and his work was included in the Penguin anthology Children of Albion: Poetry of the Underground in Britain.

== Later career ==
After a twenty-five year (1970-1995) hiatus he began to write again. Appalled by the state of poetry publishing he founded Sixties Press in 1993 which has published poetry and books by a number of authors including Daisy Abey and Brenda Williams. A review of Tebbs work in Poetry Magazines included the following, "Tebb's poetry plays on tensions implicit in the public and the private, the spoken and unspoken, the formal and the free. He is obviously an accomplished poet with a great deal to say."

A collection of his work including manuscripts, typescript papers, books and pamphlets (1993-2003) is held in the Special Collections in the Leeds University Library.

His parents were working class and he enjoyed growing up in Leeds, and the sense of community among the people, of everyone looking out for each other. Tebb was also a passionate campaigner with Brenda Williams for better mental health services. He published several books on the subject. He also has a Mental Health Blog where he pursues the needs of patient and carers of which he had personal experience.

== Private life ==
Tebb met Brenda Williams through a mutual friend and they married in 1967. They had a son Isaiah and subsequently divorced in 1975. They remained close and when they returned to Leeds lived next to each other. Williams began writing poetry in the '70s and Tebb published her work in his own Sixties Press. Williams moved to Oxford then London and Tebb moved close to where she resided each time. She had severe depression throughout her life and protested and campaigned for better mental health care and Tebb supported her efforts and was, when needed, her carer. She was diagnosed with lung cancer and died in July 2015.

While living near Williams in London, Tebb met his partner, poet and fiction writer Daisy Abey.

Isaiah, the child of Tebb and Williams, studied at Eton then Balliol College Oxford but was hospitalised and remains so with chronic paranoid schizophrenia In 2004 he published a poem Coming to terms with schizophrenia (in Tranquility Street : new and selected poems) with the opening line : Why our son, why?

== Bibliography ==
=== Poetry ===
1966 Five quiet shouters : an anthology of assertive verse : Angela Carter, Peter Redgrove, Wendy Oliver, John Cotton and Michael Holmes. (editor)

1966 The quarrel with ourselves

1968 Three regional voices : Iain Crichton Smith, Barry Tebb and Michael Longley

1969 Children of Albion: Poetry of the Underground in Britain (One of 63 poets included)

1970 Cross-currents

1997 Summer with Margaret

2000 In memory of my mother and other poems

2000 Bridge over the Aire : the autobiography of a poet (co author with Daisy Abey)

2001 The road to Haworth Moor

2001 The lights of Leeds

2001 Windsong

2001 Winterlight

2002 Closing nostalgia road : selected poems 1962 - 2002

2003 Collected Poems

2003 Kissing cobblestones in Keighley

2004 Selected Poems 1964 - 2004

2004 Tranquility Street : new and selected poems

2005 Sixties Press anthology of Gregory Fellows' Poetry (co author with Debjani Chatterjee)

2006 The real survivors anthology : poetry for life (Easy guide for patients and carers (EGPAC)) (editor)

2007 The nostalgic bus : new collected poems

2008 Strangers on the shore

2009 New poems 2007 - 2009

2015 Cut Flowers – Selected Poems 1964-2015

2016 Barry Tebb Collected Poems 1964-2016

=== Novels/Mental Health Issues ===
2003 Kith and kin : experiences in mental health caring

2004 The great freedom : a novella about the 'Leeds poetic renaissance' of the sixties

2005 Life and death in Camden

2005 Censored in Camden :the closure of Jamestown Day Centre

2005 Pitfall Street

2005 The fiddler and his bow :the autobiography of a poet

2006 Beyond stigma : experiences of mental health survivors (Easy guide for patients and carers (EGPAC))

2006 Acid drops : selected reviews

2008 No children should have to live the way I lived : Sutton young carers handbook

2013 The overdose (EGPAC)

2014 Young carers handbook (editor) (Kindle edition of 2008 title)
