= Poems and Problems =

1969 poetry book

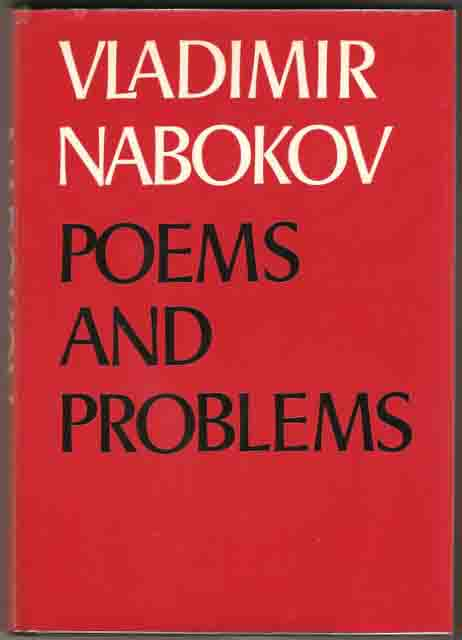
- First edition
- Author: Vladimir Nabokov
- Publisher: McGraw-Hill
- Publication date: 1969

Poems and Problems (ISBN 0-07-045724-7) is a book by Vladimir Nabokov published in 1969. It consists of 39 poems originally written in Russian and translated by Nabokov, 14 poems written in English, and 18 chess problems.

One of the 39 poems originally written in Russian, "Lilith," in 1928, can be looked at as a foreshadowing of his 1955 novel Lolita. However, in the author's notes, Nabokov states that "Intelligent readers will abstain from examining this impersonal fantasy for any links with my later fiction," and that the poem was written "...to amuse a friend."

== Table of contents ==
- THIRTY-NINE RUSSIAN POEMS

	English	Russian
1.	The Rain Has Flown	Дождь пролетел
2.	To Liberty	К свободе
3.	I Still Keep Mute	Еще безмолвствую и крепну я в тиши
4.	Hotel Room	Номер в гостинице
5.	Provence	Солнце
6.	La Bonne Lorraine	
7.	The Blazon	Герб
8.	The Mother	Мать
9.	I Like That Mountain	Люблю я гору
10.	The Dream	Сновидение
11.	The Snapshot	Снимок
12.	In Paradise	В раю
13.	The Execution	Расстрел
14.	For Happiness the Lover Cannot Sleep	От счастия влюбленному не спится
15.	Lilith	Лилит
16.	The Muse	К музе
17.	Soft Sound	Тихий шум
18.	Snow	Снег
19.	The Formula	Формула
20.	An Unfinished Draft	Неоконченный черновик
21.	Evening on a Vacant Lot	Вечер на пустыре
22.	The Madman	Безумец
23.	How I Love You	Как я люблю тебя
24.	L'Inconnue de la Seine	
25.	At Sunset	На закате
26.	We So Firmly Believed	Мы с тобой так верили
27.	What Happened Overnight	Что за ночь с памятью случилось
28.	The Poets	Поэты
29.	To Russia	К России
30.	Oculus	Око
31.	Fame	Слава
32.	The Paris Poem	Парижская поэма
33.	No Matter How	Каким бы полотном батальным
34.	On Rulers	О правителях
35.	To Prince S.M. Kachurin	К князю С.М. Качурину
36.	A Day Like Any Other	Был день как день
37.	Irregular Iambics	Неправильные ямбы
38.	What Is the Evil Deed	Какое сделал я дурное дело
39.	From the Gray North	С серого севера

- FOURTEEN ENGLISH POEMS

	English
1	A Literary Dinner
2	The Refrigerator Awakes
3	A Discovery
4	The Poem
5	An Evening of Russian Poetry
6	The Room
7	Voluptates Tactionum
8	Restoration
9	The Poplar
10	Lines Written in Oregon
11	Ode to a Model
12	On Translating Eugene Onegin
13	Rain
14	The Ballad of Longwood Glen

== Quote ==
- "Chess problems demand from the composer the same virtues that characterize all worthwhile art: originality, invention, conciseness, harmony, complexity, and splendid insincerity."
