= Adam Horovitz (poet) =

British poet (born 1971)

Adam Horovitz (born 1971) is a British poet. He is the son of the poets Michael Horovitz and Frances Horovitz.

== Biography ==
Born in London in 1971, he moved with his parents to Stroud, Gloucestershire, the same year. He has been active as a poet since the 1990s but has been writing since childhood. He released his first pamphlet, Next Year in Jerusalem, in 2004 and a second, The Great Unlearning, in 2009.

He was the poet in residence for Glastonbury Festival's official website in 2009 and was voted onto the Hospital Club 100 in 2010 as an emerging talent. He was the poet in residence for the county of Herefordshire between 2015 and 2016 and for the Pasture-fed Livestock Association from 2016 to 2017.

His debut collection, Turning, was released by Headland in 2011. He was awarded a Hawthornden Fellowship in 2012. His second book, released by the History Press in June 2014 to coincide with the Laurie Lee centenary celebrations, was A Thousand Laurie Lees, which draws on memoir, myth and literature inspired by Cider with Rosie country.

In 2015 he released an album of poetry and music, Little Metropolis, written in collaboration with Josef Reeve. It was originally commissioned as a show for the 2015 Stroud Fringe Festival. Little Metropolis was shortlisted for the 2016 Saboteur Awards. In 2018, his book The Soil Never Sleeps was published by Palewell Press, after a year-long residency on four Pasture-fed Livestock Association farms. A second, extended edition of the book was released in 2019, including a new section written after spending two seasons on two Exmoor farms. In April 2020, he launched The Thunder Mutters, a poetry and music podcast celebrating the work of John Clare, with fiddle player Becky Dellow, with whom he has collaborated on shows since 2014.

In 2021, a poem of his was included on the Cerys Matthews and Hidden Orchestra album We Come From the Sun, released on Decca, alongside nine other poets including Lemn Sissay, Imtiaz Dharker and Liz Berry. Horovitz's third collection of poetry, Love and Other Fairy Tales, was published in late 2021 by Indigo Dreams.

Horovitz's fourth collection of poems, Slow Migrations, was published by Indigo Dreams in 2025. Originally commissioned by the musician Chris Cundy as a suite of poems to accompany Cundy's music for a Resonance FM documentary, Archaeology of the Ear, the poems in Slow Migrations explore the archaeology, architecture, history and mythology of Neolithic Gloucestershire, as seen through the lens of the Corinium Museum's neolithic collection, and the Roman baths at Bath.

Horovitz's pamphlet Rock Paper Scissors, written in collaboration with Ella Duffy, was published by Dialect in 2026, and was the summer Pamphlet Choice for the Poetry Book Society.

== Bibliography ==
- Next Year in Jerusalem (Hoo-Hah, 2004)
- The Great Unlearning (Hoo-Hah, 2009)
- Turning (Headland, 2011)
- A Thousand Laurie Lees (History Press, 2014)
- Only the Flame Remains (Yew Tree, 2014)
- The Physic Garden (editor) (Palewell, 2017)
- The Soil Never Sleeps (Palewell, 2018 and second, extended edition 2019)
- Love and Other Fairy Tales (Indigo Dreams, 2021)
- Slow Migrations (Indigo Dreams, 2025)
- Rock Paper Scissors (in collaboration with Ella Duffy) (Dialect, 2026)

== Discography ==
- Little Metropolis (2015)
- We Come From the Sun (one track) (Decca, 2021)
