= Barry Cole =

British poet

Barry Cole (born 13 November 1936) was a poet and novelist from Woking, Surrey.

== Biography ==
Cole was born in Woking, Surrey and was educated at Balham Secondary School in London. He did military service in the Royal Air Force from 1955 to 1957. His subsequent career included 1958 employment with Reuters news agency in London, working as a reporter (1965–70), as a senior editor (1974–94) at the Central Office of Information, London. He was Northern Arts Fellow at the University of Newcastle-upon-Tyne and Durham University (1970–72). He published several collections of poems and four novels. His 1968 poetry collection, Moonsearch, was a Poetry Book Society recommendation. In 2015, Shoestring Press published a festschrift celebrating his life, edited by John Lucas. This included poems, a story, photographs, essays and Cole's final, innovative sequence of 13 poems, Broken Sonnets, which are marked by the use of ellipses to suggest gaps of memory or words that are too painful to be given expression.

In 1959, he married Rita Linihan and they had three daughters, Celia, Rebecca, and Jessica. He was a close friend of the writer Bryan Johnson, whose 1973 suicide had a traumatic effect on Cole.

== Bibliography ==
Poetry

- Blood Ties (Turret Books, 1967)
- Moonsearch (1968)
- Ulysses in the Town of Coloured Glass (London, Turret, 1968)
- The Visitors (1970)
- Vanessa in the City (Trigram Press, 1971)
- Pathetic Fallacies (London, Eyre Methuen, 1973)
- The Rehousing of Scaffardi (Richmond, Surrey: Keepsake Press, 1976)
- Dedications (Byron Press: 1977)
- Inside Outside: New and Selected Poems (Shoestring Press, 1997, ISBN 1-899549-11-0)
- Ghosts Are People Too (Shoestring Press, 2003)
- Broken Sonnets (privately printed 'eyelet' chap book, 2008)

Novels

- A Run Across the Island (1968)
- Joseph Winter's Patronage (1969)
- In Search of Rita (Methuen, 1970)
- The Giver (Methuen, 1971)
