= Paul Evans (poet) =

Welsh poet

Paul Evans (1945 – 1991) was a Welsh poet associated with the British Poetry Revival. He is included in the anthology British Poetry since 1945 and the 1969 anthology Children of Albion: Poetry of the Underground in Britain.

His work has been described as similar to that of Lee Harwood, with a dreamy tone and surrealist images. His poems have no definite meaning, but alter each time they are read.

== Publications ==
- Current Affairs, Arc Publications, 1970
- True Grit, An Ant's Forefoot Eleventh Finger Voiceprint Edition, Essex, 1970
- February, Fulcrum Press, 1971
- Prokofiev's Concerto, Skylark Press, Brighton, 1975
- O.I.N.C.: An adventure story (The Human Handkerchief 4), with Peter Bailey, Wivenhoe Park, 1975
- The Manual for the Perfect Organisation of Tourneys, Oasis Books, London, 1979
- The Mountain Suite, Windows, Liverpool, 1982
- Sweet Lucy, Pig Press, Durham, 1983
- The Sofa Book, 1987.
- The Door at Taldir: Selected Poems, ed. Robert Sheppard, Shearsman Books, 2009
