= Pete Hoida =

English painter (

Pete Hoida artist and poet was born at Birkenhead in 1944 and died at his home in Brownshill near Stroud in 2023. He was an abstract artist committed to the modernist tradition. He ceased writing circa 1985, after which he dedicated his time wholly to painting. After a hiatus of 25 years he resumed writing and had poems published 2011–2016.

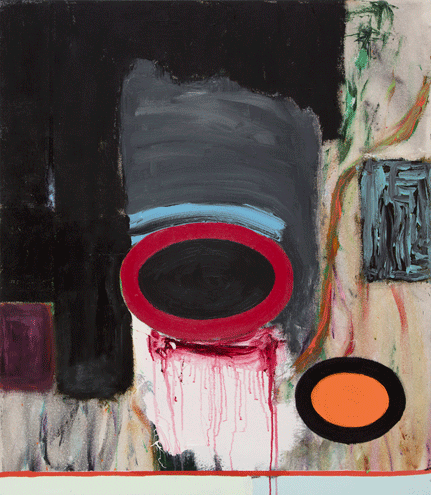
Mirror 119 x 104 cm October 2015

== Poetry ==
A "Little Magazines" and "Slim Volume" poet of the 1960s/'70s, Hoida would be better represented by these later volumes: Literary Breakfast, The Correct Demanded Direction, and Stumble, which were only printed in very small editions of 300 copies and received scant attention. His more noticed, very early published Lips, would not represent him at his best. He also published: Selected Poems of Blaise Cendrars (translation). More recently, poems have been published in magazines: Obsessed with Pipework; The Rialto. In 2016, The Decline of Heavy Industry, a pamphlet of new poems, was published, hailed by the editor Philip Rush as "a return to poetry with fresh-eyed modernism".

== Painting ==
Hoida studied painting at Hammersmith College of Art and Building (1969–1972) and Goldsmiths College School of Art, London University (1972–1974), painting thereafter from Stroud, Gloucestershire.

"Marrying an abstract distinctly English landscape sensibility that draws on Patrick Heron and Ivon Hitchens with the fierce transatlantic colourism of Hans Hofmann and Nicolas de Staël's velvety tachism, Hoida arrives at an intensely personal synthesis, resonating with landscape feeling." Or as Alan Gouk puts it: "his colour is not just thought up in the studio as part of some "non-referential" building kit" or AG again, as above "….persist, nonetheless, in trying to render fulgent the fuliginous, to make clear things that are tacit and cloudy, that have no name until painted….." "...earthy and realistic, or realistic to the spirit of lyrical or lovely or moody feeling ..."). "Hoida's is of a more lyrical, European form of Abstract Expressionism. He is an English artist carrying on the grand traditions of English art from Constable's 'Six-Footers' to a euphoric use of colour that Hoida controls so well, so evocative but so differently spiced than Patrick Heron. His palette is his own and his art is to do with the essence of painting..". " 'This is a painting,' they say: 'attend to the object itself; observe its mechanisms.' But who can stop the play of the imagination? Hoida is a poet: there is nothing in his painting or his poetry that would suggest he would want to. He just likes to remind us that an artefact is just that: an object made with craft and cunning, the product of a specific sensibility, a mind and a memory, in time and space.”. Chris Stephens, Director of the Holburne Museum wrote of Hoida: "A formative, youthful friendship was with the great Scottish poet W. S. Graham, much of whose work concerned itself with the craftsmanship of the medium, of the battle to assemble constructions of words that convey precise meaning without creating specific narratives. In his exploration of the inherent tension between the abstract qualities and evocative potential of his practice, Graham found a natural affinity with painters whose marks carried less inherent meaning than the poet’s words. One might see Hoida’s paintings in comparable ways to that constructed verse, his creation of blocks from a varied set of painting techniques like the construction of phrases, clauses or sentences and their assembly into a whole that is rich in its suggestive power but entirely non-representational."

In a video for Abstract Critical made in 2013 Pete Hoida discusses his work with artist Graham Boyd. A short documentary film, The Black Severn Angel by Alasdair Ogilvie for Damnable Iron Films, in 2015, shows Hoida in the studio and on location at the River Severn, Sharpness Docks, Birkenhead Priory, and New Brighton, Merseyside. In the video Structure Through Colour, Mel Gooding analyses and appreciates Pete Hoida's paintings, 2016.

== Exhibitions ==
Selected solo exhibitions include: Axiom, Cheltenham, 1986; Guildhall Arts Centre, Gloucester, 1987 & 1992; The Living Room, London, 1994; Museum & Art Gallery, Cheltenham, 1995; 7 Goodge Place, London, 1997; deli Art, London, 2000; Ashcroft Modern Art, Cirencester, 2006; Subscription Rooms, Stroud, 2007; SE1 Gallery, London, 2008; The Museum in the Park, Stroud, & St Mary of the Angels, 2013; HSoA Gallery, London, 2015; The Malthouse, Stroud, 2018; APT (Art in Perpetuity Trust) Gallery, London, 2019; Williamson Art Gallery, Birkenhead, 2024; Museum in the Park, Stroud, 2024.

Selected group exhibitions include: Camden Arts Centre, London; Spacex, Exeter; Pelter/Sands, Bristol; The Grundy Art Gallery, Blackpool; The Atkinson Art Gallery, Southport; Boundary Gallery, London; Blackburn Museum and Art Gallery; Gwl Gelf, Harlech Art Biennale; The Schoolhouse Gallery, Bath; Sun & Doves, London; Royal West of England Academy, Bristol; Dean Clough, Halifax; The Social Bases of Abstract Art, UpDown Gallery, Ramsgate
