= Frances Horovitz =

English poet and broadcaster (1938–1983)

- Born: Frances Margaret Hooker; 13 February 1938; London, England
- Died: 2 October 1983 (aged 45)
- Occupations: poet, broadcaster
- Spouse(s): Michael Horovitz (m. 1964; div. 1980) Roger Garfitt
- Children: Adam Horovitz

Frances Margaret Horovitz (née Hooker; 13 February 1938 – 2 October 1983) was an English poet and broadcaster.

== Life and work ==
Frances Margaret Hooker (who adopted and wrote under the surname of her first husband, Michael Horovitz) was born in Walthamstow, London, in 1938 but moved with her family to Nottingham in 1942 when her father was appointed manager of a munitions factory there. In 1947 they returned to London and Frances attended Walthamstow School for Girls. She went on to Bristol University to study English and Drama and then to the Royal Academy of Dramatic Art in London. As a reader and presenter for the BBC, she acquired a reputation for care of preparation and quality of delivery. Her poetry has been described as "not that of the 'age' but of the earth" by Anne Stevenson. However, according to Peter Levi, such is her economy of means in the poems "that one runs the risk of not noticing how effective they are"; the effect of her writing is cumulative and "adds up to a shadow of something more vast and powerful than any individual work". Her writing gives voice principally to perceptions of the natural world, but also ancient history and human relationships within its framework.

Frances married two poets: Michael Horovitz in 1964 and Roger Garfitt just before her death in 1983. Her only child Adam Horovitz, also a poet, was born in 1971. She herself did not really start writing poetry until shortly after marrying Michael. Much of her paid work was in teaching part-time in schools and reading or performing the work of others on stage, radio and television. In the broadcasting world she started as the protégée of George MacBeth. In 1970 she and Michael bought the cottage of Mullions in the Slad Valley, where she remained based until the end of 1980. After that she and Adam moved to join Roger Garfitt in Sunderland, where she was eventually diagnosed with skin cancer in her left ear. Operations and other treatments failed to stop its spread and she died in the Royal Marsden hospital at the age of 45.

== Publications ==
- Poems (St. Albert's, 1967)
- Dream: A Poem (Sceptre, 1969)
- The High Tower (New Departures, 1970)
- Letter to Be Sent by Air (Sceptre, 1974)
- Elegy (Sceptre, 1976)
- Water Over Stone (Enitharmon, 1980)
- Wall (a collaboration (L.Y.C.) 1981)
- Rowlstone Haiku (with Roger Garfitt, Five Seasons, 1982); the poems are reprinted in Oswald Jones, Winterreise: An Exhibition of Landscape Photographs (Canterbury, 1982)
- Snow Light, Water Light (Bloodaxe, 1983)
- Collected Poems (Bloodaxe/Enitharmon, 1984, edited by Roger Garfitt; 2nd edition, 2011, includes CD-ROM of readings by, and an interview with, Frances Horovitz)

== Publications about Frances Horovitz ==
- Horovitz, Michael (ed. 1984), A Celebration of and for Frances Horovitz (1938–1983) (New Departures; 2nd edn, 1984, issued as New Departures, vol. 16)
- Sewell, Brocard (ed. 1987), Frances Horovitz—Poet: A Symposium (Aylesford Press)
