= Gael Turnbull =

Scottish poet (1928–2004)

- Born: 7 April 1928; Edinburgh, Scotland
- Died: 2 July 2004 (aged 76); Herefordshire, England
- Education: Christ's College, Cambridge; University of Pennsylvania
- Occupations: poet, physician
- Known for: A Gathering of Poems" 1950—1980, There are Words: Collected Pems

Gael Turnbull (7 April 1928 – 2 July 2004) was a Scottish poet who was an important figure in the British Poetry Revival of the 1960s and 1970s.

== Biography ==
Turnbull was born in Edinburgh and grew up in Northern England and in Canada, where he moved with his parents at the beginning of World War II. He studied Natural Sciences at Christ's College, Cambridge, and graduated in Medicine from the University of Pennsylvania in 1951. As a doctor and anesthetist, he worked in Ontario; London, England; Ventura, California; Worcester; and Barrow-in-Furness.

His poetry first appeared in a book in Canada in 1954. Trio, an anthology of poems by Turnbull, Eli Mandel and Phyllis Webb, was published by Raymond Souster's Contact Press. His poems also appeared in Origin, Cid Corman's magazine.

In 1957, Turnbull started Migrant Press, one of the first British-run presses to focus on poets in the modernist tradition. His work was featured in the groundbreaking Revival anthology Children of Albion: Poetry of the Underground in Britain (1969). His own books include A Gathering of Poems 1950-1980 (1983) and Rattle of Scree: Poems (1997). He was also published in the anthologies The New British Poetry (1988), Other: British and Irish Poetry since 1970 (1999) and Anthology of Twentieth-Century British and Irish Poetry (2001). He was a significant presence on the 'late modernist' poetry scene, as evidenced by his extensive correspondence with poet Roy Fisher.

He returned to Edinburgh after he retired from medical practice in 1989. In this city, he worked on what he termed kinetic poems; texts for installation in which the movement of the reader and/or of the text became part of the reading experience. He died on a visit to Herefordshire of a sudden brain hemorrhage.

In 2006, Turnbull's collected poems, There Are Words, were published by Shearsman Books.

== Selected bibliography ==
- Trio: First Poems by Gael Turnbull, Phyllis Webb, and Eli Mandel, with Phyllis Webb and Eli Mandel. Toronto: Contact Press (1954).
- If a Glance Could Be Enough. 16 pages. SATIS (Malcolm Rutherford) (1978). ISBN 0904199045
- A Gathering of Poems 1950-1980. Anvil Press Poetry Ltd (1983). ISBN 0856460877
- Circus, edited by Pamela Scott. Limited signed ed (50) edition (December 1984). IBN 0951085409
- From the Language of the Heart: Some Imitations from the Gaelic of Sine Reisideach. Gnomon Distribution, 1985. ISBN 0917788273
- While Breath Persist. 160 pages. Porcupine's Quill (1991). ISBN 0889841330
- To the Tune of Annie Laurie: Poems. 16 pages. Akros Publications (April 1995). ISBN 086142025X
- Helen Macdonald/Gael Turnbull/Nicholas Johnson by Helen Macdonald, Gael Turnbull and Nicholas Johnson. 118 pages. Etruscan Books (January 1997). ISBN 1901538052
- Rattle of Scree: Poems. 20 pages. Akros Publications (Oct 1997). ISBN 0861420810
- Transmutations. 23 pages. Shoestring Press (October 1998). ISBN 1899549129
- A Perception of Ferns, illustrated by Raine Clarke. 16 pages. Essence Press (Sept. 2003). ISBN 190421102X
- The Storey's Story: Memories, Stories, Poems, Images, with Rodge Glass and Jacob Polley, edited by Rodge Glass. Lancaster Litfest Publications (November, 2004). ISBN 0954088069
- There Are Words: Collected Poems. 496 pages. Shearsman Books (2006) ISBN 0-907562-89-2
- More Words: Gael Turnbull on Poets & Poetry. 204 pages. Edited by Jill Turnbull and Hamish White. Shearsman Books (15 September 2012). Reviews, essays, memoirs and journal pieces. Introduction by Jill Turnbull. ISBN 1848610939
