= J. H. Prynne =

British poet (1936–2026)

J.H.Prynne

Jeremy Halvard Prynne (24 June 1936 – 22 April 2026) was a British poet closely associated with the British Poetry Revival.

== Life and career ==
Prynne was born in Bromley, grew up in Kent, and was educated at St Dunstan's College, Catford, and Jesus College, Cambridge. Initially at Gonville and Caius College as a research fellow in English, he was an official Fellow there from 1963, and Director of Studies in English; and became a Life Fellow.

Prynne retired in October 2005 from his posts teaching English literature as a Lecturer and University Reader in English Poetry, and as Director of Studies in English for Gonville and Caius College. In September 2006 he retired from his position as Librarian of the college, having held the post from 1969. He died in Cambridge on 22 April 2026, at the age of 89.

== Works ==
Prynne's early influences include Donald Davie (as a teacher) and Charles Olson. He was one of the key figures in the Cambridge group among the British Poetry Revival poets and a major contributor to The English Intelligencer. His first book, Force of Circumstance and Other Poems, was published in 1962, but Prynne excluded it from his canon. His Poems (1982) collected all the work he wanted to keep in print, beginning with Kitchen Poems (1968), with expanded and updated editions appearing in 1999, 2005, and 2015. The years 2020 to 2022 saw an unprecedented burst of productivity, during which he published two dozen small press chapbooks and several substantial collections, including book-length poems, sequences and a poetic novel.

In addition to his poetry, Prynne wrote literary criticism. A transcription of a 1971 lecture on Olson's Maximus Poems at Simon Fraser University has circulated widely. His longer works include a monograph on Ferdinand de Saussure, Stars, Tigers and the Shape of Words, and self-published erudite book-length commentaries on individual poems by Shakespeare (Sonnets 94 and 15), George Herbert ("Love III") and Wordsworth ("The Solitary Reaper"). His longstanding and passionate interest in China (he was a close friend and colleague of Joseph Needham) is reflected in an essay on New Songs from a Jade Terrace, an anthology of early Chinese love poetry, which was included in Penguin's second edition of that book (1982). His collected poetry includes a poem composed in classical Chinese under the name Pu Ling-en (蒲龄恩), reproduced in his own calligraphy. In 2016, a lengthy interview with Prynne about his poetic practice appeared in The Paris Review.

== Bibliography ==
=== Poetry ===
- Force of Circumstance and Other Poems (Routledge and Kegan Paul, 1962)
- Kitchen Poems (Cape Golliard, 1968)
- Aristeas (Ferry Press, 1968)
- Day Light Songs (Pampisford, 1968)
- The White Stones (Grosseteste Press, 1969; Rpt. New York Review of Books, 2016)
- Fire Lizard (Blacksuede Boot Press, 1970)
- Brass (Ferry Press, 1971)
- A Night Square (Albion Village Press, 1971)
- Into The Day (privately printed, distributed through Ferry Press, 1972)
- Wound Response (Street Editions, 1974)
- High Pink on Chrome (privately printed, distributed through Ferry Press, 1975)
- News of Warring Clans (Trigram Press, 1977)
- Down Where Changed (Ferry Press, 1979)
- The Oval Window (privately printed, distributed through DS -The Book Shop, 1983)
- Marzipan (printed and distributed by P. Riley as part of Poetical Histories, 1986)
- Bands Around the Throat (privately printed, distributed through Ferry Press, 1987)
- Word Order (Prest Roots Press, 1989)
- Jie ban mi Shi Hu (Poetical Histories, 1992)
- Not-You (Equipage, 1993)
- Her Weasels Wild Returning (Equipage, 1994)
- For the Monogram (Equipage, 1997)
- Red D Gypsum (Barque Press, 1998)
- Pearls That Were (privately printed, distributed through Equipage, 1999)
- Triodes (Barque, 2000)
- Unanswering Rational Shore (Object Permanence, 2001)
- Acrylic Tips (Barque, 2002)
- Biting the Air (Equipage, 2003)
- Blue Slides At Rest (2004, only available in expanded Poems, 2005)
- To Pollen (Barque, 2006)
- STREAK〜〜〜WILLING〜〜〜ENTOURAGE / ARTESIAN (Barque, 2009)
- Sub Songs (Barque, 2010)
- Kazoo Dreamboats; or, On What There Is (Critical Documents, 2011)
- Al-Dente (Face Press, 2014)
- Each to Each (Equipage, 2017)
- OF · THE · ABYSS (Materials, 2017)
- Or Scissel (Shearsman, 2018)
- The Oval Window: A New Annotated Edition (Bloodaxe, 2018)
- Of Better Scrap (Face Press, 2019; 2nd edition corrected & expanded, 2019)
- None Yet More Willing Told (Face Press, 2019)
- Parkland (Critical Documents, 2019)
- Bitter Honey (Legitimate Snack, 2020)
- Squeezed White Noise (Face Press, 2020)
- Enchanter's Nightshade (Face Press, 2020)
- Memory Working: Impromptus (Face Press, 2020)
- Her Air Fallen (Critical Documents, 2020)
- The Fever's End (Critical Documents, 2020)
- Passing Grass Parnassus (Face Press, 2020)
- Memory Working: Impromptus (XI-XVII) (Face Press, 2020)
- Aquatic Hocquets (Face Press, 2020)
- Kernels in Vernal Silence (Face Press, 2020)
- Torrid Auspicious Quartz (Face Press, 2020)
- See By So (Face Press, 2020)
- Duets Infer Duty (Face Press, 2020)
- Orchard (Equipage, 2020)
- Presume Catkins (Broken Sleep, 2021)
- Otherhood Imminent Profusion (Critical Documents, 2021)
- Athwart Apron Snaps (Slub Press, 2021)
- Efflux Reference (Face Press, 2021)
- Dune Quail Eggs (Face Press, 2021)
- Lay Them Straight (Face Press, 2021)
- Snooty Tipoffs (Face Press, 2021)
- Memory Working: Impromptus (XVIII-XXVI) (Face Press, 2021)
- At Raucous Purposeful (Broken Sleep, 2022; revised and expanded edition, Face Press, 2023)
- Sea Shells Told (Face Press, 2022)
- Shade Furnace (Critical Documents, 2022)
- Latency of the Conditional (Face Press, 2022)
- Not Ice Novice (Face Press, 2022)
- At the Monument (Face Press, 2022)
- Foremost Wayleave (Face Press, 2023)
- Hadn't Yet Bitten (Face Press, 2023)
- Timepiece in Total (Face Press, 2024)
- Alembic Forest (Face Press, 2024)
- Front Obsidian Cobalt (Face Press, 2024)
- Doric Plumage (Face Press, 2025)
- Which Scarf Match (Face Press, 2026)
- Single Tangle Mine (Face Press, 2026)

==== Collected poetry ====
- Poems (Agneau 2, 1982)
- Poems (Fremantle Arts Centre Press/Bloodaxe, 1999)
- Poems (Fremantle Arts Centre Press/Bloodaxe, 2005; expanded 2nd edition)
- Poems (Bloodaxe, 2015; expanded 3rd edition)
- Poems 2016–2024 (Bloodaxe, 2024)
- Early Poems (Face Press, 2026)
- Selected Early Work (Shearsman, 2026; ed. Ian Brinton)

=== Prose ===
==== Books ====
- Prynne, J. H. (1993). Stars, Tigers and the Shape of Words: The William Matthews Lectures 1992 Delivered at Birkbeck College, London. Birkbeck College. ISBN 978-0-907904-55-7.
- Prynne, J. H. (2001). They That Haue Powre to Hurt: A Specimen of a Commentary on Shakespeare's Sonnet 94. Cambridge.
- Prynne, J. H. (2007). Field Notes: "The Solitary Reaper" and Others. Barque Press.
- Prynne, J. H. (2011). George Herbert, "Love [III]": A Discursive Commentary.
- Prynne, J. H. (2014). Concepts and Conception in Poetry. Critical Documents. ISBN 978-0-9791412-2-5.
- Prynne, J. H. (2015). Graft and Corruption: Shakespeare's Sonnet 15. Face Press. ISBN 978-1-26862-626-3.
- Prynne, J. H. (2022). Whitman and Truth. Shearsman Books. ISBN 978-1-84861-792-6.

==== Other ====
- "China Figures," Modern Asian Studies 17 (1983), 671-704; Rpt. rev. as a "Postscript" to New Songs from a Jade Terrace: An Anthology of Early Chinese Love Poetry, trans. Anne Birrell, Penguin Classics, 1986.
- "English Poetry and Emphatical Language," Proceedings of the British Academy, 74 (1988), 135-69..
- "A Discourse on Willem de Kooning's Rosy-Fingered Dawn at Louse Point," Act 2 (1996), 34-73.
- Certain Prose of the English Intelligencer, eds. Neil Pattison, Reitha Pattison & Luke Roberts (Cambridge: Mountain, 2012). Includes early correspondence and essays by Prynne and others.
- "J. H. Prynne, The Art of Poetry No. 101," interview with Jeff Dolven and Joshua Kotin, Paris Review 218 (Fall 2016).
- Apophthegms (Cambridge: Face Press, 2017).
- "Review of Charles Olson, Maximus Poems IV, V, VI." The Park 4-5 (Summer 1969).
- "& Hoc Genus Omne" and "Ideal Weapons for Suicide Pacts," Plant time bulletins by Erasmus "Willbeen" Darwin, aka J.H. Prynne, Bean News (1972).
- "Veronica Forrest-Thomson: A Personal Memoir." On the Periphery (Street Editions, 1976); Rpt. Jacket 20 (Dec. 2002).
- "Reader's Lockjaw." Perfect Bound 5 (1978); Rpt. Jacket 20 (Dec. 2002).
- "English Poetry and Emphatical Language." Proceedings of the British Academy 74 (1988).
- "Letter to Steve McCaffery," dated 1989 [on Language Poetry]. The Gig 7 (Nov. 2000).
- "Afterword" to Original: Chinese Language-Poetry Group. Parataxis Press, 1995; Rpt. Jacket 20 (Dec. 2002).
- "Tintern Abbey, Once Again," by J. H. Prynne. Glossator 1 (2009).
- "Difficulties in the Translation of 'Difficult' Poems" by J.H. Prynne. Cambridge Literary Review 1/3 (2010).
- "Poetic Thought." Textual Practice 24/4 (2010).
- "Introduction to Prynne's Poems in Chinese," with Keston Sutherland. The Cambridge Quarterly 41/1 (2012).
- "The Night Vigil of Shen Zhou." Glossator 3 (2020).

=== Correspondence ===
- The Collected Letters of Charles Olson and J.H. Prynne, ed. Ryan Dobran (Albuquerque, NM: University of New Mexico Press, 2017).
- The Letters of Douglas Oliver and J. H. Prynne 1967-2000, ed. Joe Luna (The Last Books, 2022).

== Translations of works by Prynne ==
=== Chinese ===
- 101 Poems (in Chinese). Translated by Zhimin, Li. Guangzhou: English Poetry Studies Institute. 2008.
- Hong, Ou, ed. (2010). Pu Ling-en shi xuan 蒲龄恩诗选 [Selected Poems by J. H. Prynne] (in Chinese). Guangzhou: Zhōngshān dàxué chūbǎn shè 中山大学出版社 [Sun Yat-Sen University Press]. ISBN 9787306037992.

=== French ===
- Chansons à la journée-lumière [Day Light Songs] (in French). Translated by Dubourg, Bernard. Damazan, Lot-et-Garonne: B. Dubourg. 1975.
- Lézard de feu [Fire Lizard] (in French). Translated by Dubourg, Bernard. Damazan, Lot-et-Garonne: B. Dubourg. 1975. OCLC 1113486452.
- Poèmes de cuisine [Kitchen Poems] (in French). Translated by Dubourg, Bernard; Prynne, J. H. Damazan, Lot-et-Garonne. 1975. OCLC 500082771.
  - Poèmes de cuisine [Kitchen Poems] (in French). Translated by Dubourg, Bernard; Prynne, J. H. Marseille: Éric Pesty Éditeur. 2019 [reprint of the privately printed 1975 edition]. ISBN 9782917786574.
- Du Nouveau dans la guerre des clans [News of Warring Clans] (in French). Translated by Dubourg, Bernard; Prynne, J. H. Damazan, Lot-et-Garonne. 1980.
- Massepain [Marzipan] (in French). Translated by Dubourg, Bernard; Prynne, J. H. Cambridge: P. Riley. 1986. OCLC 52405901.
- Perles qui furent [Pearls That Were] (in French). Translated by Alferi, Pierre. Marseille: Éric Pesty Éditeur. 2013. ISBN 9782917786208.
- Au pollen [To Pollen] (in French). Translated by Lang, Abigail. Marseille: Éric Pesty Éditeur. 2021. ISBN 9782917786680.
- La Terre de Saint-Martin (in French). Translated by Richet, Martin. Marseille: Éric Pesty Éditeur. 2022. ISBN 9782917786789.

=== German ===
- Gedichte (in German). Translated by Stolterfoht, Uhl; Thill, Hans. Heidelberg: Verlag das Wunderhorn. 2007. ISBN 9783884232811.

=== Norwegian ===
- Sand og Kobber (in Norwegian). Translated by Grue, Torleiv. Oslo: Forlaget Oktober. 1989. ISBN 9788270944934.

== Works about Prynne ==
=== Books ===
- Reeve, N. H.; Kerridge, Richard (1995). Nearly Too Much: The Poetry of J. H. Prynne. Liverpool: Liverpool University Press. ISBN 978-0-85323-840-9.
- Johansson, Birgitta (1997). The Engineering of Being: An Ontological Approach to J. H. Prynne. Swedish Science Press. ISBN 978-91-7191-309-8.
- Brinton, Ian, ed. (2009). A Manner of Utterance: The Poetry of J. H. Prynne. Shearsman Books. ISBN 978-1-84861-043-9.
- Pietrzak, Wit (2012). Levity of Design: Man and Modernity in the Poetry of J. H. Prynne. Cambridge Scholars Publishing. ISBN 978-1-4438-4395-9.
- Hall, Matthew (2015). On Violence in the Work of J. H. Prynne. Cambridge Scholars Publishing. ISBN 978-1-4438-8190-6.

=== Other ===
- The J.H. Prynne Papers, Cambridge University Library Special Collections.
- Finding aid for The English Intelligencer Archive at Fales Library and Special Collections, New York University.
- Festschrift For J.H. Prynne, Quid 17 (2006).
- On the Poems of J.H. Prynne. Ed. Ryan Dobran. Glossator 2 (2010). Complete volume dedicated to Prynne.
- 'Rich in Vitamin C', poem by J.H.Prynne, with commentary by John Kinsella. Jacket # 6 (January 1999).
- "An introduction to the poetry of J.H.Prynne" by Rod Mengham and John Kinsella. Jacket # 7 (April 1999)
- "Going Electric" by Patrick McGuinness. London Review of Books (7 Sept. 2000).
- A review of The Collected Poems by Forrest Gander in The Chicago Review (2007).
- "J.H. Prynne and the Late-Modern Epic" by Matt Hall. Cordite Poetry Review (December 2009).
- "Prints in the New Snow: Notes on 'Es Lebe der König', J.H. Prynne's Elegy to Paul Celan" by Matt Hall. Cordite Poetry Review (2013).
- "The Huntsman of the Rubáiyat: J H Prynne and Peter Henry Lepus Go to Abu Ghraib" by Simon Eales. Cordite Poetry Review (February 2016).
- Prynne, J. H. (2018). The Oval Window. Bloodaxe Books. ISBN 978-1-78037-126-9. (Annotated edition with two accompanying critical essays)
- "By Law in Sound: J.H. Prynne's Recent Poetry" by Luke Roberts, Chicago Review (2020).
- "Bands Around the Throat, J.H. Prynne, Racial Capitalism" by M.A. King. Jacket 2 (2021).
- "To Darker Fields We Go" by David Grundy. Poetry Foundation (2026).
- "Biblio-voodoo: Prynne's People" by Iain Sinclair. London Review of Books (22 Oct. 2026).
