= Michael Horovitz =

English poet, artist, and translator (1935–2021)

Michael W. Horovitz OBE
- Born: Michael Yechiel Ha-Levi Horovitz; 4 April 1935; Frankfurt am Main, Nazi Germany
- Died: 7 July 2021 (aged 86); London, England
- Occupations: Poet; Editor of New Departures; Artist
- Spouse: Frances Horovitz (m. 1964; div. 1980)
- Children: Adam Horovitz
- Writing career
- Notable work: Children of Albion (editor)

Michael W. Horovitz (4 April 1935 – 7 July 2021) was a German-born British poet, editor, visual artist and translator who was a leading part of the Beat Poetry scene in the UK. In 1959, while still a student, he founded the "trail-blazing" literary periodical New Departures, publishing experimental poetry, including the work of William S. Burroughs, Allen Ginsberg and many other American and British beat poets. Horovitz read his own work at the 1965 landmark International Poetry Incarnation, at the Royal Albert Hall in London, deemed to have spawned the British underground scene, when an audience of more than 6,000 came to hear readings by the likes of Ginsberg, Burroughs, Gregory Corso and Lawrence Ferlinghetti.

Characterised as an early champion of oral and jazz poetry, Horovitz in the following decades organised many "Live New Departures" events featuring poetry and jazz performances by a range of writers and musicians, including Adrian Mitchell and Stan Tracey. Horovitz also devised the Poetry Olympics festival, held for the first time in Poets' Corner of Westminster Abbey in 1980, with participants over the years including Linton Kwesi Johnson, John Cooper Clarke, Paul McCartney, Eliza Carthy and Damon Albarn.

== Life and career ==
Horovitz was born in 1935 in Frankfurt, then in Nazi Germany. He was the youngest of ten children who were brought to Britain in 1937 by their Jewish parents, Rosi (née Feist) and Dr Avraham Horovitz, both of whom were part of a network of European rabbinical families, and from London Dr Horovitz helped organise routes for other Jewish families to flee the Holocaust.

Michael Horovitz attended William Ellis School in north London, and went on to read English at Brasenose College, Oxford, from 1954 to 1960. In 1959, while still a student, he founded the periodical New Departures, publishing authors such as William S. Burroughs, Samuel Beckett, and Stevie Smith. Horovitz continued to edit New Departures for 50 years. He coordinated many poetry events such as "Live New Departures", Jazz Poetry Super Jams and the Poetry Olympics festivals. Though initially associated with the British Poetry Revival, Horovitz became known by his appearance at the International Poetry Incarnation at the Royal Albert Hall on 11 June 1965, alongside Allen Ginsberg and Alexander Trocchi.

In 1969, Penguin Books published Horovitz's Children of Albion anthology. Introducing him to New York City in 1970, Ginsberg characterised him as a "Popular, experienced, experimental, New Jerusalem, Jazz Generation, Sensitive Bard".

In 1971, Horovitz published The Wolverhampton Wanderer, an epic of Britannia, in twelve books, with a resurrection & a life for poetry united, with an original dustjacket by Peter Blake. The book is a collection of British artists of the period, with illustrations and photographs by Peter Blake, Michael Tyzack, Adrian Henri, Patrick Hughes, Gabi Nasemann, Paul Kaplan, John Furnival, Bob Godfrey, Pete Morgan, Jeff Nuttall, David Hockney, as well as Horovitz and others. It is a visual and literary elegy to the culture surrounding association football up to the 1960s, celebrating not only Wolves and its supporters, but also Arsenal, Spurs, and teams from the North. Horovitz's Growing Up: Selected Poems and Pictures, 1951–79 was published by Allison & Busby in 1979.

In 2007, Horovitz published A New Waste Land: Timeship Earth at Nillennium, described by D. J. Taylor in The Independent as "a deeply felt clarion-call from the radical underground", and by Tom Stoppard as "A true scrapbook and songbook of the grave new world".

Horovitz stood for election as Oxford Professor of Poetry in 2010 (supported by Tony Benn). Contributing to The Guardian, Horovitz wrote then:

I would most likely pitch some of my lectures around the legacies of my closest comrades in the broad continuum of poetry, from David and Solomon to James Joyce, Sappho to Bessie Smith, Beowulf to Lead Belly, medieval troubadours to the beat generation, Keats to Bob Dylan and Blake to Beckett.

In the same article he emphasised the connections between art media, stage and page poetry, and his wish to extend "communal paths my bardmobile has struck over the last five decades." In the event. Horovitz came second, in a field of 11, to Geoffrey Hill.

In January 2011, Horovitz contributed to an eBook collection of political poems entitled Emergency Verse – Poetry in Defence of the Welfare State, edited by Alan Morrison. An eccentric and colourful part of the UK poetry scene, Horovitz fronted the William Blake Klezmatrix (one his heroes being the 19th-century poet and painter William Blake), featuring trombonist Annie Whitehead, pianist Peter Lemer, and often, in later years, his companion, poet and singer Vanessa Vie, where he played his "anglo-saxophone", an updated and extended eunuch flute of his own devising. To celebrate Horovitz's 80th birthday, a limited-edition album was produced of a 2013 recording of his poem sequence "Bankbusted Nuclear Detergent Blues", on which he is accompanied by Paul Weller, Graham Coxon and Damon Albarn.

== Personal life and death ==
Horovitz was married to the English poet Frances Horovitz (1938–1983), their son Adam Horovitz (born 1971) is also a poet, performer and journalist.

Michael Horovitz's home was in Notting Hill, London. In his later years, it became a notoriously chaotic repository of his personal papers and archives. "Indoor skip it may seem to you, but compared to Francis Bacon's studio, my pad here is Versailles", he said in a 2010 Evening Standard interview. Horovitz was a loyal supporter of Arsenal Football Club.

Horovitz met the British-Spanish artist Vanessa Vie in 2012, with whom he sustained a personal and creative partnership until his death.

Horovitz died at St Mary's Hospital, Paddington, on 7 July 2021, at the age of 86. He was also recognised for his artwork and at the time of his death a two-week exhibition of his "Bop Art paintings, collages and picture poems" was opening at the Chelsea Arts Club (6–25 July).

Michael Horovitz is buried in Kensal Green Cemetery next to Harold Pinter, Eric Fried, Anthony Trollope, Wilkie Collins, William Makepeace Thackeray, among other renowned contributors to the worlds of literature and the arts.

== Publications ==
=== Books ===
- Declaration (1963)
- Strangers (with Maria Simon; 1965)
- Nude Lines for Larking in Present Night Soho (Goliard Press, 1965)
- High Notes from when I Was Rolling in Moss (Latimer Press, 1966)
- Poetry for the People (Latimer Press, 1966)
- Bank Holiday: a New Testament for the Love Generation (Latimer Press, 1967)
- Love Poems: Nineteen Poems of Love, Lust and Spirit (New Departures, 1971)
- The Wolverhampton Wanderer (Latimer, 1971; ISBN 978-0-901539-14-4)
- Growing Up: Selected Poems & Pictures 1951–79 (Allison and Busby, 1979)
- Midsummer Morning Jog Log (with Peter Blake; Five Seasons Press, 1986, ISBN 978-0-9504606-8-0)
- Wordsounds and Sightlines: New and Selected Poems (New Departures, 1994, ISBN 978-0-902689-20-6)
- A New Waste Land: Timeship Earth at Nillennium (New Departures, 2007, ISBN 978-0-902689-18-3)

=== As editor ===
- Children of Albion: Poetry of the Underground in Britain, New Departures 1-24 (Penguin Books, 1969, ISBN 978-0-14-042116-3)
- A Celebration of & for Frances Horovitz (1938–1983) (New Departures, 1984, ISBN 978-0-902689-12-1)
- The POW! (Poetry Olympics Weekend) Anthology, ISBN 978-0-902689-17-6
- The POP! (Poetry Olympics Party) Anthology, ISBN 978-0-902689-19-0
- The POM! (Poetry Olympics Marathon) Anthology (New Departures, 2001, ISBN 978-0-902689-21-3)
- The POT! (Poetry Olympics Twenty05) Anthology (New Departures, 2007, ISBN 978-0-902689-25-1)
- Jeff Nuttall's Wake on Paper: A Keepsake Anthology of the Life, Work and Play of a Polymath Extraordinaire, ISBN 978-0-902689-22-0
- Grandchildren of Albion: An Illustrated Anthology of Voices and Visions of Younger Poets in Britain (New Departures, 1992, ISBN 978-0-902689-14-5)
- Open Windows, Open Doors: Poems, Pictures, and Reflections by Vanessa Vie (New Departures, 2020),. ISBN 978-0-902689-27-5

=== As translator ===
- Europa by Anatol Stern (with Stefan Themerson)
- The Egghead Republic by Arno Schmidt (ISBN 978-0-714525-91-4)

=== On art ===
- Alan Davie (1963)
- Michael Horovitz Goes Visual
- Michael Horovitz: Bop Paintings, Collages & Picture-Poems

== See also ==
- British Poetry since 1945
- Liverpool poets
- The Mersey Sound (poetry anthology)
