= Diebel =

Diebel is a German surname is a variant of Diebelt which had lost its end consonant, while Diebelt is a Germanic dithematic name that combines the Germanic roots diot/thiod/thiad ('people') and bald ('bold', 'strong'). Notable people with the surname include:

- Elias Diebel (active 16th century), German woodcutter and book painter
- Franz Diebel (1850–1901), German ironworks owner and politician
- Nelson Diebel (born 1970), American swimmer

== See also ==
- Deibel/Deubel, another surname, which in some cases may have originated from a given name with the same etymology.
- Other variants:
  - Germanic: Diebel, Diebold, Diebolt, Diepold, Theudebald, Theobald, Theobaldy, Theobold, Tibbot, Tybalt
  - French: Thibaud, Thibault, Thibaut, Thibeault, Thiébaut
  - Italian: Tebaldo, Teobaldo
  - Other: Czech: Děpolt; Hungarian: Tibold
