= Thibaud =

Thibaud is a name of French origin, a form of Theobald.

== Surname ==
- Anna Thibaud (1861–1948), French singer.
- Jacques Thibaud (1880–1953), French violinist
- Laure Thibaud (born 1978), French synchronized swimmer
- Marcel Thibaud (1896–1985), French politician
- Todd Thibaud (born before 1987), American singer-songwriter

== Personal name ==
- Thibaud II (Theobald II, Count of Champagne, 1090–1152)
- Thibaud III (Theobald III, Count of Champagne, 1179–1201)
- Thibaud IV (Theobald I of Navarre, 1201–53), Count of Champagne and King of Navarre
- Thibaud Le Chansonnier (Theobald II of Navarre, (c.1239–70), King of Navarre
- Thibaud Chapelle (born 1977), French international rower
- Thibaud Gaudin (c.1229–92), French Grand Master of the Knights Templar
- Thibaud Mouille (born 1999), French freestyle skier

== See also ==
- Other variants:
  - Germanic: Diebold, Diepold, Theudebald, Theobald, Theobalt, Theobaldy, Theobold, Tibbot, Tybalt
  - French: Thibaut, Thibault, Thibeault, Thiébaut
  - Italian: Tebaldo, Teobaldo
  - Other: Irish: Tiobóid; Czech: Děpolt; Hungarian: Tibold
