= Thibaut =

Thibaut is a name of French origin, a form of Theobald. It means brave people or courageous people.

== Surname ==
- Anton Friedrich Justus Thibaut (1772–1840), German jurist
- Bernhard Friedrich Thibaut (1775–1832), German mathematician
- George Thibaut (1848–1914), German-born indologist
- Georges Pierre Thibaut (1920–unknown), Belgian chess master
- Jean-Claude Thibaut (born 1968), French filmmaker, visual artist, and producer
- John Thibaut (1917–86), American social psychologist
- Kristi Thibaut (born 1964 or 1965), American politician in Texas
- Major Thibaut (born 1977), American politician in Louisiana
- Philippe Thibaut (active from 1993), French designer and video game producer
- Willem Thibaut, Tybaut, or Tibout (1524–97), Dutch painter

== Given name ==
- Thibaut III (Theobald III, Count of Champagne, 1179–1201)
- Thibaut I (Theobald I of Navarre, 1201–53), King of Navarre, aka Theobald IV, Count of Champagne
- Thibaut d'Anthonay (born 1962), French writer
- Thibaut de Blaison (died after March 1229), Poitevin nobleman, crusader, and trouvère
- Thibaut Courtois (born 1992), Belgian footballer
- Thibaut Detal (born 1985), Belgian footballer
- Thibaut Duval (born 1979), Belgian pole vaulter
- Thibaut Fauconnet (born 1985), French speed skater
- Thibaut de Longeville (born 1974), French writer, filmmaker, creative director
- Thibaut Monnet (born 1982), Swiss ice hockey player
- Thibaut Pinot (born 1990), French road bicycle racer
- Thibaut Privat (born 1979), French rugby player
- Thibaut de Reimpré (1949–2023), French painter
- Thibaut Van Acker (born 1991), Belgian footballer
- Thibaut Vion (born 1993), French footballer
- Thibault Visensang (born 1991), French rugby player

== See also ==
- Other variants:
  - Germanic: Diebel, Diebold, Diebolt, Diepold, Theudebald, Theobald, Theobaldy, Theobold, Tibbot, Tybalt
  - French: Thibaud, Thibault, Thibaut, Thibeault, Thiébaut
  - Italian: Tebaldo, Teobaldo
  - Other: Czech: Děpolt; Hungarian: Tibold
