= Diebold (surname) =

Diebold is a surname of Germanic origin composed of the old Germanic words theud ‘people, race’ + bald, bold ‘bold, brave’ (see Theobald). It is related to the French name Thibault which shares the same origin.

Notable people with the surname include:

- A. Richard Diebold Jr. (1934–2014), American linguistic anthropologist
- Albert Diebold (1895–1955), French rower
- Bernhard Diebold (1886–1945), Swiss journalist
- Charles Diebold (1824–1894), American industrialist
- Clarence Diebold (1881–1944), American football player
- Foster Diebold (1932–2018), American academic
- Francis X. Diebold (born 1959), American economist
- Gerald Diebold, American physicist
- John Diebold (1926–2005), American businessman
- Laure Diebold (1915–1965), French resistance member
- Paulo Diebold (1925–1983), Brazilian rower
- Ulrike Diebold (born 1961), Austrian physicist

== See also ==
- Debold M. Sinas (1965–2020), Filipino retired police general
- Other variants:
  - Germanic: Diebel, Diebold, Diepold, Theudebald, Theobald, Theobold, Tibbot, Tybalt
  - French: Thibaud, Thibault, Thibaut, Thibeault, Thiébaut
  - Italian: Tebaldo, Teobaldo
  - Other: Czech: Děpolt; Hungarian: Tibold
