= Tebaldo =

Tebaldo is an Italian given name, a variant of Teobaldo or Theobald; see the latter article for other variants. Notable people with the name include:

- Carlo Pietro Giovanni Guglielmo Tebaldo Ponzi, or Charles Ponzi, Italian charlatan and con artist, the namesake of the Ponzi Scheme.
- Tebaldo Bigliardi (born 1963), Italian footballer
- Tebaldo Monzani (1762–1839), Italian flautist, music publisher, flute maker and composer.

== See also ==
- Other variants:
  - Germanic: Diebel, Diebold, Diebolt, Diepold, Theudebald, Theobald, Theobaldy, Theobold, Tibbot, Tybalt
  - French: Thibaud, Thibault, Thibaut, Thibeault, Thiébaut
  - Italian: Tebaldo, Teobaldo
  - Other: Czech: Děpolt; Hungarian: Tibold
