= Theudebald (name) =

Theudebald (also Theodebald, Theodobald, Theudowald, Theutbald or Teutbold) is a Germanic masculine given name from the early Middle Ages. It may refer to:

- Theudebald, king of the Franks (547–55)
- Theudebald, Duke of Alamannia (floruit 709–45)
- Theutbald I (bishop of Langres) (floruit 841–56)
- Theutbald II (bishop of Langres) (floruit 888–94)

== See also ==
- Other variants:
  - Germanic: Diebold, Diebolt, Diepold, Theudebald, Theobald, Theobalt, Theobaldy, Theobold, Tibbot, Tybalt
  - French: Thibaud, Thibaut, Thibault, Thibeault, Thiébaut
  - Italian: Tebaldo, Teobaldo
  - Other: Irish: Tiobóid; Czech: Děpolt; Hungarian: Tibold
