= Děpolt =

Děpolt or Děpold is an old Czech masculine given name, a variant of the German name Diepold, which was derived from Theobald. Notable people with the name include:

- Děpold I of Jamnitz, Bohemian nobleman
- Děpolt II, Bohemian nobleman
- Děpolt III, Bohemian nobleman, father of Boleslaus, son of Děpolt

== See also ==
- Other variants:
  - Germanic: Diebold, Diebolt, Diepold, Theudebald, Theobald, Theobalt, Theobaldy, Theobold, Tibbot, Tybalt
  - French: Thibaud, Thibaut, Thibault, Thibeault, Thiébaut
  - Italian: Tebaldo, Teobaldo
  - Other: Irish: Tiobóid; Czech: Děpolt; Hungarian: Tibold
