= Thibault =

Thibault is a French personal name and surname, a form of Theobald, a Germanic name composed from the elements theod- "people" and bald "bold".

== Surname ==
- Arthur Thibault (1914–1983), Canadian farmer and political figure in Saskatchewan
- Bernard Thibault (born 1959), French trade unionist, Secretary of the Confédération Générale du Travail (CGT)
- Conrad Thibault (1903–1987), American baritone vocalist
- David Thibault (born before 2013), French-Canadian singer and Elvis impersonator
- Dominique Thibault (born 1988), Canadian ice hockey player
- Emmanuel Thibault (born 1974), French dancer
- François-Anatole Thibault (1844–1924), French writer and Nobel Laureate
- François Thibault (born before 1992), French Maître de chai (Cellar Master)
- Geneviève Thibault de Chambure (1902–1975), French musicologist
- Gérard Thibault d'Anvers (1574–1626), Dutch fencing master
- Guy Thibault (born before 1978), Canadian army officer
- Jean-Baptiste Thibault (1810–1879), Canadian Roman Catholic priest and missionary
- Joachim Thibault de Courville (died 1581), French composer, singer, lutenist, and player of the lyre, of the late Renaissance
- Jocelyn Thibault (born 1975), Canadian ice hockey goaltender
- Lise Thibault (born 1939), Canadian civil servant and former Lieutenant Governor of Quebec
- Louis Michel Thibault (1750–1815), French-born South African architect and engineer
- Louise Thibault (born 1947), Canadian politician
- Mike Thibault (born 1951), American professional basketball head coach
- Olivette Thibault (1914–1995), Canadian stage, film and television actress
- Robert Thibault (born 1959), Canadian politician
- Romain Thibault (born 1991), French footballer
- Sophie Thibault (born 1961), Canadian journalist and television reporter
- Victor Thibault (1867 – after 1900), French archer who competed in the 1900 Olympic Games

== Personal name ==
- Thibault Anselmet (born 1997), French ski mountaineer
- Thibault Bazin (born 1984), French politician
- Thibault Bourgeois (born 1990), French footballer
- Thibault Corbaz (born 1994), Swiss footballer
- Thibault Damour (born 1951), French physicist
- Thibault Daurat (born 2003), French wheelchair racer
- Thibault Dubarry (born 1987), French rugby union player
- Thibaut Duval (AKA Thibault, born 1979), Belgian pole vaulter
- Thibault Giresse (born 1981), French footballer
- Thibault Godefroy (born 1985), French bobsledder
- Thibault Isabel (born 1978), French writer and publisher
- Thibault Lacroix (born 1985), French rugby union player
- Thibault Marchal (born 1986), French footballer
- Thibault de Montbrial (born 1969), French lawyer
- Thibault Moulin (born 1990), French footballer
- Thibault Scotto (born 1978), French footballer
- Yves-Thibault de Silguy (born 1948), French and European politician
- Thibault Tchicaya (born 1983), Gabonese international footballer
- Thibault Verny (born 1965), French archbishop
- Thibault Vinçon (born 1976), French film and theater actor
- Thibault Visensang (born 1991), French rugby union player
- Aaron Thibeaux "T-Bone" Walker (1910-1975), American blues guitarist

== See also ==
- Thibaud (disambiguation)
- Thibaut
- Thibeault (disambiguation)
- Thiébaut (disambiguation)
- Tim Tebow
- Other variants:
  - Germanic: Diebold, Diepold, Theudebald, Theobald, Theobalt, Theobaldy, Theobold, Tibbot, Tybalt
  - French: Thibaut, Thibault, Thibeault, Thiébaut
  - Italian: Tebaldo, Teobaldo
  - Other: Irish: Tiobóid; Czech: Děpolt; Hungarian: Tibold
