= Tibbot =

Tibbot may refer to:

- Tibbot na Long Bourke, 1st Viscount Mayo (1567–1629), Irish peer and parliamentarian
- Tibbot MacWalter Kittagh Bourke (c. 1570–1602 or after), 21st Chief of Mac William Íochtar

== See also ==
- Other variants:
  - Germanic: Diebold, Diepold, Theudebald, Theobald, Theobalt, Theobaldy, Theobold, Tibbot, Tybalt
  - French: Thibaud, Thibaut, Thibault, Thibeault, Thiébaut
  - Italian: Tebaldo, Teobaldo
  - Other: Irish: Tiobóid; Czech: Děpolt; Hungarian: Tibold
