= Vecna (disambiguation) =

Vecna is a fictional character in Dungeons & Dragons, a role-playing game.

Vecna may also refer to:

== Businesses ==
- Vecna Technologies, an American healthcare information technology company
- Vecna Robotics, an American industrial robotics and technology company

== Television ==
- Vecna (Stranger Things), the main antagonist of Stranger Things

== Gaming ==
- Vecna Lives!, a 1990 Dungeons & Dragons adventure
- Die Vecna Die!, a 2000 Dungeons & Dragons adventure
- Vecna: Eve of Ruin, a 2024 Dungeons & Dragons adventure
