= Theobald =

Theobald is a Germanic dithematic name, composed from the elements theod- "people" and bald "bold". The name arrived in England with the Normans.

The name and occurs in many spelling variations, including Diebold, Diepold, Theobold, Theudebald, Tibbot, Theobaldy, Theobalt, Tybalt; in French Thibaut, Thibault, Thibeault, Thiébaut, etc.; in Italian Tebaldo; in Spanish and Portuguese Teobaldo; in Irish Tiobóid; in Czech Děpolt; and in Hungarian Tibold.

Notable people called Theobald include:

== Given name ==
=== Mononymic ===
- Saint Theobald of Dorat (990–1070), French saint
- Saint Theobald of Marly (died 1247), French saint and Cistercian abbot
- Saint Theobald of Provins (1033–1066), French hermit and saint
- Theobald (ispán), 12th-century Hungarian nobleman
- Theobald of Langres (12th century), number theorist
- Theobald I, Duke of Lorraine (c. 1191–1220), the Duke of Lorraine (1213–1220)
- Theobald II, Duke of Lorraine (1263–1312), the Duke of Lorraine (1303–1312)
- Theobald I of Blois (913–975), the first Count of Blois, Chartres, and Châteaudun, as well as Count of Tours
- Theobald II of Blois (c. 985–1004), eldest son and heir of Odo I, Count of Blois, and Bertha of Burgundy
- Theobald III of Blois (1012–1089), also known as Theobald I of Champagne, count of Blois, Meaux and Troyes
- Theobald II of Champagne (1090–1152), also known as Theobald IV of Blois (1090–1152), Count of Blois and of Chartres as Theobald IV (1102–1152) and Count of Champagne and of Brie as Theobald II 1125–1152
- Theobald III, Count of Champagne (1179–1201), Count of Champagne (1197–1201)
- Theobald IV of Champagne (1201–1253), also known as Theobald I of Navarre, Count of Champagne (1201–1253) and King of Navarre (1234–1253)
- Theobald V of Champagne (c. 1239–1270), also known as Theobald II of Navarre, Count of Champagne and Brie (as Theobald V) and King of Navarre (1253–1270)
- Theobald of Bec (c. 1090–1161), Archbishop of Canterbury (1138–1161)
- Theobald, Bishop of Liège (died 1312), ruler of Liège (1302–1312)

=== Oher ===
- Theobald von Bethmann Hollweg (1856–1921), German politician and statesman who served as Chancellor of the German Empire (1909–1917)
- Theobald Mathew (temperance reformer) (1790–1856), Irish temperance reformer
- Theobald Mathew (legal humourist) (1866–1939), English barrister and legal humourist
- Theobald Mathew (barrister, born 1898) (1898–1964), English Director of Public Prosecutions
- Theobald Mathew (officer of arms) (1942–1998), English officer of arms
- Theobald Smith (1859–1934), American scientist
- Theobald Stein (1829–1901), Danish sculptor
- Theobald Wolfe Tone (1763–1798), Irish revolutionary figure and leader of the 1798 United Irishmen's rising

== Surname ==
- Daniel Theobald (born 1975), founder and chairman of Vecna Robotics, co-founder of Vecna Technologies
- David Theobald (born 1978), English football (soccer) player
- Densill Theobald (born 1982), Trinidadian football (soccer) player
- Frederick Vincent Theobald (1868–1930), British entomologist
- Hilda Theobald (1901–1985), English artist
- James Theobald (1688–1759), Natural historian, merchant and antiquary
- James Theobald (1829–1894), English politician
- Karl Theobald (born 1969), English stand-up comedian and actor
- Lewis Theobald (1688–1744), British textual editor and author, an 18th-century editor of Shakespeare
- Louis Theobald (1938–2025), Maltese footballer
- Nichola Theobald, English film, television and voice-over actress, television presenter, and fashion model
- Nicolas Théobald (1903–1981) lorrain and French geologist, paleontologist and professor of geology at university of Besançon.
- Robert Theobald (1929–1999), American economist and futurist
- Robert Alfred Theobald (1884–1957), American admiral
- William Theobald (1829–1908), British malacologist and naturalist

== See also ==
- Other variants:
  - Germanic: Diebold, Diepold, Theudebald, Theobald, Theobalt, Theobaldy, Theobold, Tibbot, Tybalt
  - French: Thibaut, Thibault, Thibeault, Thiébaut
  - Italian: Tebaldo, Teobaldo
  - Other: Irish: Tiobóid; Czech: Děpolt; Hungarian: Tibold
