= Paul Tibold =

Hungarian nobleman

Ispán of Gerzence
- Reign: 1326–1327
- Predecessor: Michael Bő (1297–1303)
- Successor: Stephen Pacsai (1352)
- Died: 1330 or 1331
- Noble family: gens Tibold
- Father: Mihalc

Paul from the kindred Tibold (Hungarian: Tibold nembeli Pál; died 1330 or 1331), was a Hungarian nobleman in the early 14th century, who was active in Slavonia during the era of feudal anarchy. As a familiaris of Mikcs Ákos, he was a supporter of Charles I of Hungary until Paul betrayed the king for unknown reasons.

== Family ==
Paul was born into the gens (clan) Tibold, which arrived to the Hungary in the late 10th century and later acquired possessions in Slavonia too. His father was Mihalc, whose parentage is uncertain. Hungarian historian János Karácsonyi considered Mihalc was the son of Petke (a diminutive form of Peter), because of the frequent use of the name Peter in his branch. Nevertheless, Croatian historian Vjekoslav Klaić presented a document which implies that Grab and Demetrius (I) were the sons of Petke. Tamás Pálosfalvi argued that Petke was given no portion in Szencse lordship in Križevci County (present-day Novska, Croatia) during the division of estates within the kindred in 1231, while Mihalc's descendants were landowners there.

Paul had two brothers, Peter (I) and Nicholas (II). The former died before 1332 and a lesser branch of the Szencsei (Svetački) family descended from him.

== Career ==
Paul first appears in contemporary records in 1314, when their relative John (I) Tibold donated all estates to him and his brothers, which had formerly belonged to the possessions of Zerje Tibold, who died without male descendants. Consequently, Paul and his brothers became owners of Stupčanica Castle (or Szaplonca, today in Veliki Bastaji, Croatia), among others. The sons of James Kamarcai referred to Paul as their kinsman in 1324.

As a prominent member of the Slavonian nobility, Paul entered the service of Ban Mikcs Ákos, an influential confidant of Charles I of Hungary. He served as župan (or ispán) of Gerzence County in Slavonia from 1326 to 1327, plausibly appointed by Ban Mikcs Ákos. In this capacity, he was involved in a lawsuit with some local nobles of Garešnica (Gerzence) over estates in 1326. Together with his brother Nicholas, Paul took part in the siege of Sjenićak (Sztenicsnyák) in the autumn of 1327, when Mikcs captured the castle from the rebellious Babonić family. In the next year, in March 1328, he was referred to as ispán of Szana County, also in the service of the ban. Paul donated a portion of his estate laid on the bank of the stream Gračenica to the Pauline monastery of Garić (Garics) in 1329.

Prior to 1332, Paul turned against Charles I for unknown reasons and barricaded himself into the fort of Stupčanica, where from he constantly plundered the region and committed "innumerable sorts of evil" to the detriment of the king's supporters. During a clash, Peter Pekri (or Dobrakucsai) from the gens (clan) Tétény, lord of the neighboring Dobra Kuća (Dobrakucsa) captured and imprisoned him. Paul was killed in prison by lightning strike, possibly in 1330 or 1331.

Paul had no descendants, thus his estates, including Stupčanica Castle, were inherited by his brother Nicholas (II). He swore loyalty to Charles and handed over the fort to the king, and was accordingly pardoned together with his son John (V) and his nephews. They were able to retain their possessions, and Nicholas was granted some additional portions.

== Sources ==
- Engel, Pál (1996). Magyarország világi archontológiája, 1301–1457, I. [Secular Archontology of Hungary, 1301–1457, Volume I] (in Hungarian). História, MTA Történettudományi Intézete. ISBN 963-8312-44-0.
- Karácsonyi, János (1900). A magyar nemzetségek a XIV. század közepéig. [The Hungarian genera until the middle of the 14th century] (in Hungarian). Hungarian Academy of Sciences.
- Klaić, Vjekoslav (1913). Plemići Svetački ili nobiles de Zempche (997–1719) [The Nobles of Svetački or nobiles de Zempche (997–1719] (in Croatian). Rad Jugoslavenske Akademije Znanosti i Umjetnosti 199.
- Pálosfalvi, Tamás (2014). The Noble Elite in the County of Körös (Križevci), 1400–1526 (in Hungarian). MTA Bölcsészettudományi Kutatóközpont. ISBN 978-963-962-7840.
