= Thibaud (disambiguation) =

Thibaud is a name of French origin, a form of Theobald.

Thibaud may also refer to:

- Long-Thibaud-Crespin Competition, an international classical music competition for pianists, violinists and singers that has been held in France since 1943
- Saint-Thibaud-de-Couz, a commune of the Savoie department in the Rhône-Alpes region in south-eastern France
- Thibaud, Dominica, a village
- Thibaud River, a river on the Caribbean island of Dominica
