= Thiébaut =

Thiébaut or Thiebaut is a surname of French origin. Notable people with the surname include:

- Bill Thiebaut (born 1947), American politician from Colorado
- Gunter Thiebaut (born 1977), Belgian soccer player
- Jean-Luc Thiébaut (born 1960), French handball player
- Léon Thiébaut (1878–1943), French fencer

== See also ==
- Other variants:
  - Germanic: Diebold, Diepold, Theudebald, Theobald, Theobalt, Theobaldy, Theobold, Tibbot, Tybalt
  - French: Thibaut, Thibault, Thibeault, Thiébaut
  - Italian: Tebaldo, Teobaldo
  - Other: Irish: Tiobóid; Czech: Děpolt; Hungarian: Tibold
