= Teobaldo =

Teobaldo is an Italian given name, a variant of Theobald; see the latter article for other variants. Some people named with the variants may also be called "Teobaldo". Notable people with the name include:

- Teobaldo Boccapecci, birth name of Pope-elect Celestine II
- Teobaldo Depetrini, Italian footballer
- Teobaldo Manucci or Aldus Manutius (1449/1452–1515), Italian printer and humanist
- Teobaldo Nina Mamani (born 1965), Peruvian painter
- Teobaldo II Ordelaffi (1413–1425), Italian nobleman
- Teobaldo Roggeri (1100 - 1150), beatified Italian Roman Catholic shoemaker and porter
- Teobaldo Visconti, birth name of Pope Gregory X

== See also ==
- Other variants:
  - Germanic: Diebold, Diepold, Theudebald, Theobald, Theobalt, Theobaldy, Theobold, Tibbot, Tybalt
  - French: Thibaut, Thibault, Thibeault, Thiébaut
  - Italian: Tebaldo, Teobaldo
  - Other: Irish: Tiobóid; Czech: Děpolt; Hungarian: Tibold
