= Thibeault =

Thibeault is a surname of French origin, a form of Theobald. People with the surname include:

- Fabienne Thibeault (born 1952), Canadian singer
- Glenn Thibeault (born 1969), Canadian politician
- Larry Thibeault (1915–1977), Canadian ice hockey player
- Tammara Thibeault (born 1996), Canadian boxer
- Yolande Thibeault (born 1939), Canadian journalist and politician

== Other uses ==
- Testa, Hurwitz & Thibeault, American law firm in Boston, MA 1973–2005

== See also ==
- Other variants:
  - Germanic: Diebold, Diepold, Theudebald, Theobald, Theobalt, Theobaldy, Theobold, Tibbot, Tybalt
  - French: Thibaut, Thibault, Thibeault, Thiébaut
  - Italian: Tebaldo, Teobaldo
  - Other: Irish: Tiobóid; Czech: Děpolt; Hungarian: Tibold
