= Diegel =

Diegel is a surname. Notable people with the surname include:

- Leo Diegel (1899–1951), American golfer
- Ralf Diegel (born 1963), German swimmer

== See also ==
- Diebel
