= Teufel =

Teufel may refer to:

- Teufel (surname)
- "Teufel" (song), Megaherz
- Teufel Audio, German audio-equipment company
- Teufel Nursery in Oregon
