= Diepold =

Diepold or Dipold is a Germanic dithematic name, a variant of Theobald. Notable people with this name include:

- Diepold of Berg
- Diepold III, Margrave of Vohburg
- Dipold, Count of Acerra
- Diepold II

== See also ==
- Other variants:
  - Germanic: Diebold, Diepold, Theudebald, Theobald, Theobalt, Theobaldy, Theobold, Tibbot, Tybalt
  - French: Thibaut, Thibault, Thibeault, Thiébaut
  - Italian: Tebaldo, Teobaldo
  - Other: Irish: Tiobóid; Czech: Děpolt; Hungarian: Tibold
