= Babócsa =

Babócsa Babotsch / Babotscha (in German) Bobovec (in Croatian)
- Village
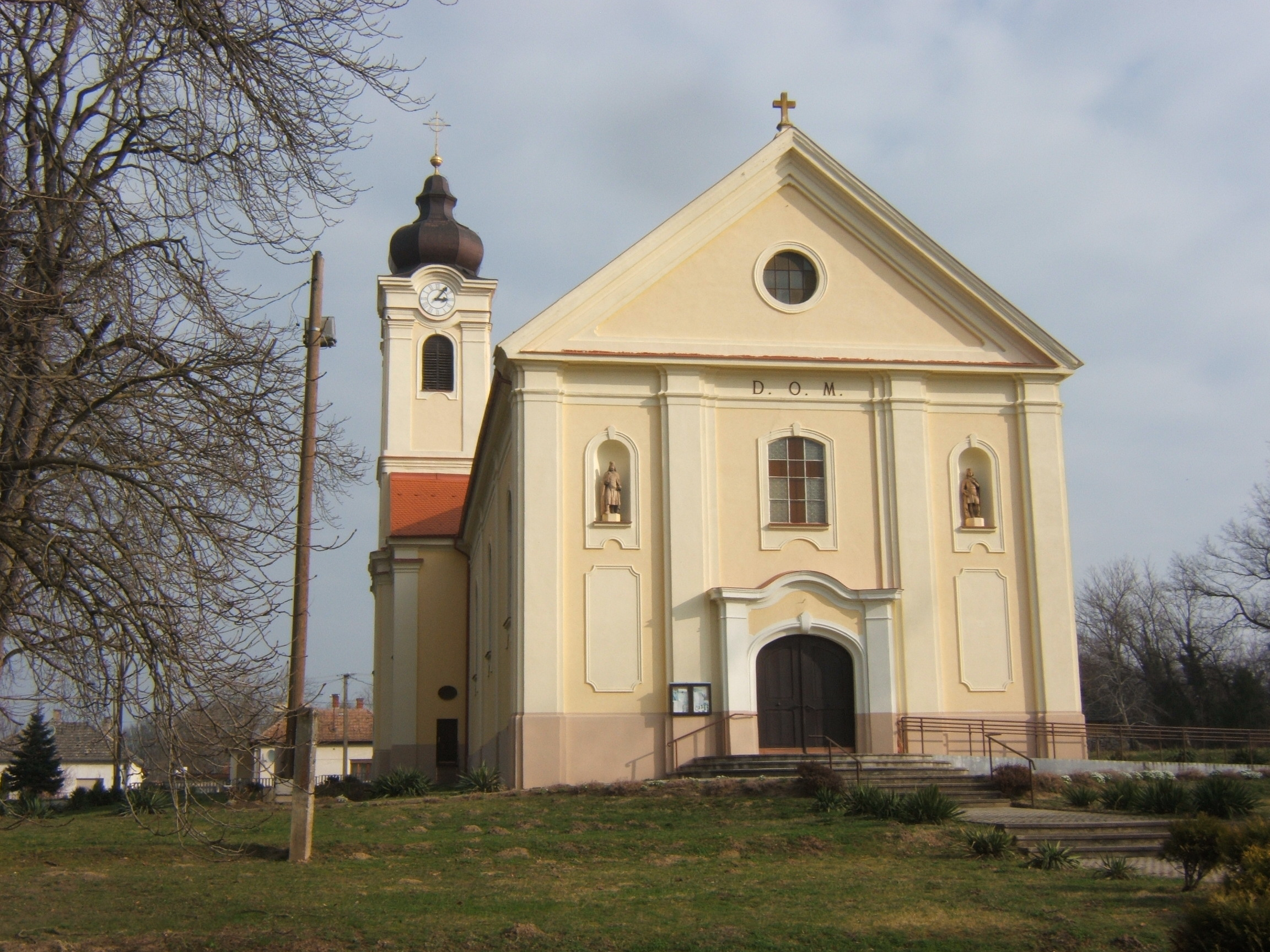
- Roman Catholic Church of Babócsa

- Coat of arms

- Location of Somogy county in Hungary

- Location of Babócsa
- Coordinates: 46.03786°N 17.34454°E
- Country: Hungary
- Region: Southern Transdanubia
- County: Somogy
- District: Barcs
- RC Diocese: Kaposvár
- Market town: 15th century AD

Area
  - Total: 30.99 km^{2} (11.97 sq mi)

Population (2017)
  - Total: 1,458
  - Density: 47.05/km^{2} (121.9/sq mi)
- Demonym: babócsai
- Time zone: UTC+1 (CET)
  - Summer (DST): UTC+2 (CEST)
- Postal code: 7584
- Area code: (+36) 82
- NUTS 3 code: HU232
- MP: László Szászfalvi (KDNP)
- Website: Babócsa Online

Babócsa (German: Babotsch / Babotscha, Croatian: Bobovec) is a village in Somogy County, Hungary.

== Etymology ==
Its name derives from the Hungarian or South Slavic world bab (English: bean) which is a typical plant in the region.

== Geography ==
It is on the southern side of Inner Somogy, 5 km from the Hungarian-Croatian-border. The Brook Rinya flows in the River Drava in the village. The settlement is situated east of the main road 68 and on the Nagykanizsa-Pécs Railway Line.

== History ==
=== Middle Ages ===
The territory of Babócsa has been inhabited already since the copper and bronze ages. Its first ruler was the Hungarian chieftain, Bogát. Later Koppány became the owner Babócsa, but after the Battle of Veszprém his territories were given to Tibold, the founder of the Tibold noble kindred, by Saint Stephen of Hungary. They established a monastery here for the Benedictine and dedicated it to Saint Nicholaus. The building was also a burial place of the family. In 1231 the territory of the Tibold family was split into pieces and this area came in the hands of the three sons of Bodor: Jakab, Kozma and Petke. The papal tithe registration mentioned Babócsa's parish between 1332 and 1337. An official document written in 1348 refers to the Benedictine Abbey of Babócsa.

In 1369 the village belonged to the Babólcsai family. The son of Miklós Babólcsai, László had no descendant therefore the territory came in the hands of Dénes Marczali. The Marczali family made the settlement also their seat.

A decree from year 1478 also mentioned the settlement in which this parish inherited Kisbabócs from János Marczali. According to the papal tithe registration just a chapel stood in the village. In the 15th century Babócsa had already market town rights. An official document from 1434 states that it was an oppidum. In 1475 the town belonged to the Báthory family. The Báthory family and the Mórocz de Meggyesalja family made an inheritance contract in 1490 which also consisted Babócsa. The Castle of Babócsa was also mentioned in it therefore it stayed in the hands of the Báthory family in 1495.

The Benedictine Abbey of Babócsa existed in 1536 according to the tax register.

== Main sights ==
- Babócsai Basa Garden Nature Reserve
- Törökvár (English: Turkish Castle)
- Castle of Basakert
- church ruins from the Árpád era
- ruins of a Motte-and-bailey castle from the Árpád era
- Somssich Mansion (built in 1820 in Classicist style
- Turkish well house from the 18th century
- Narcissus Day and Narcissus Run
- Thermal Spa of Babócs (since 2008 closed)

== Gallery ==
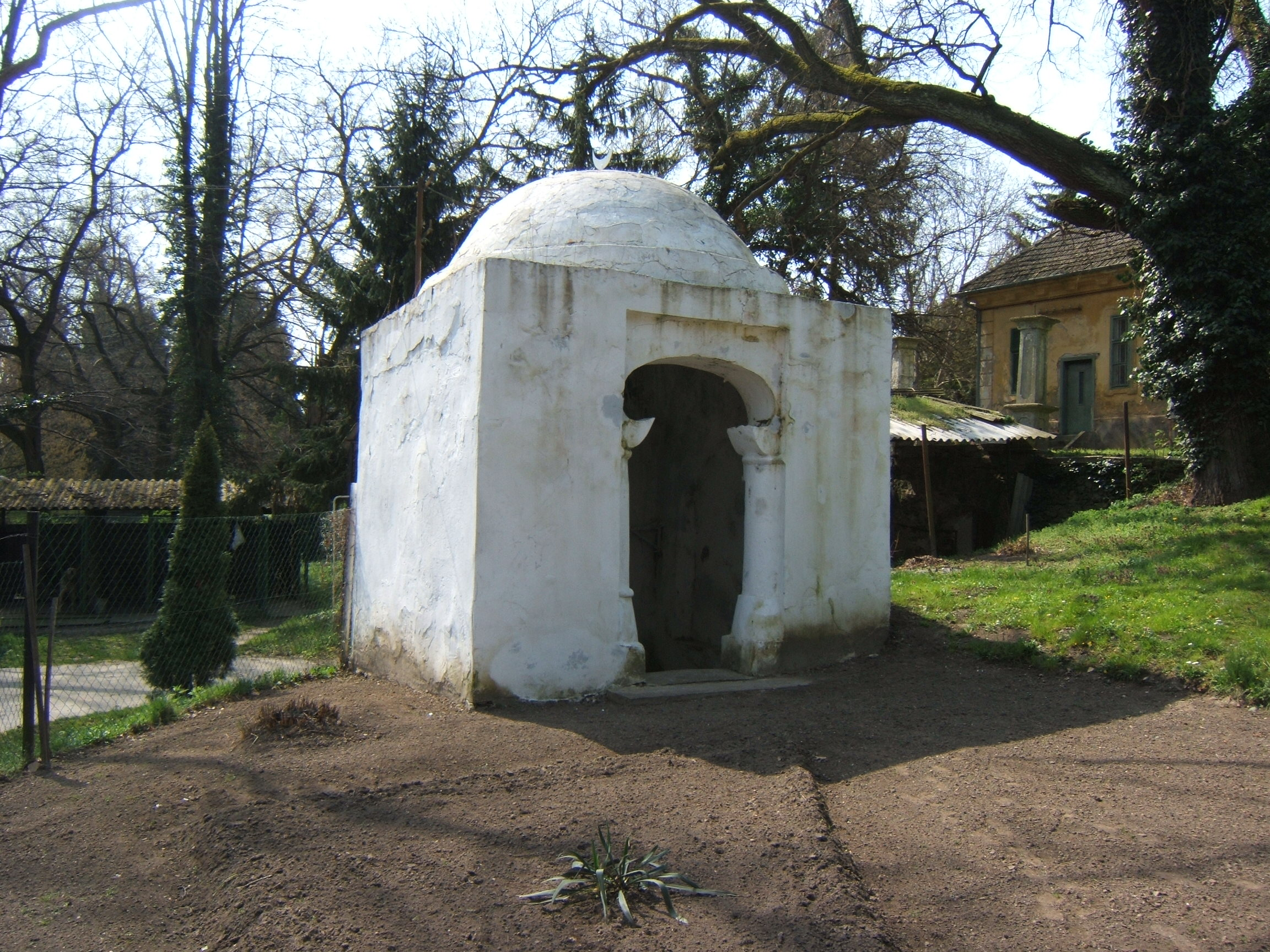
Turkish well

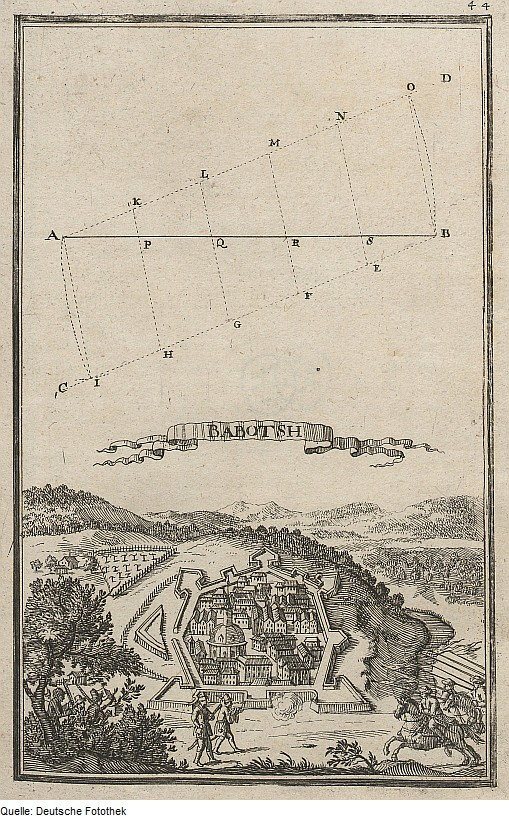
Castle of Babócsa by Anton Ernst Burkhard von Birckenstein (1698)

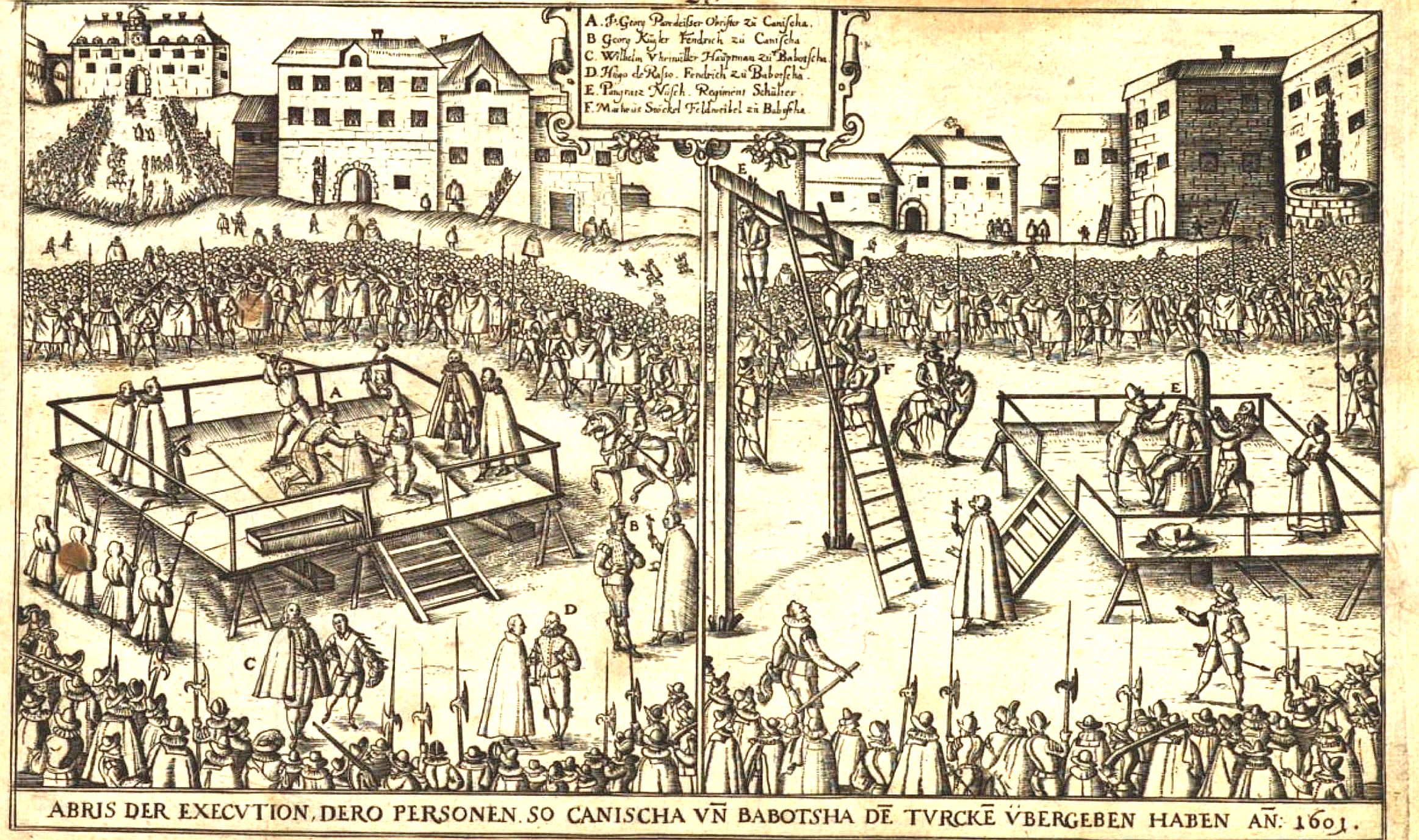
Execution of the soldiers for betrayal of the Castle of Babócsa by Paul Fürst (1663)

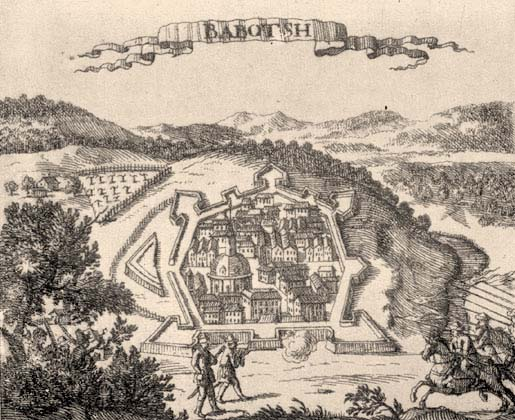
Castle of Babócsa by Samu Borovszky (1914)

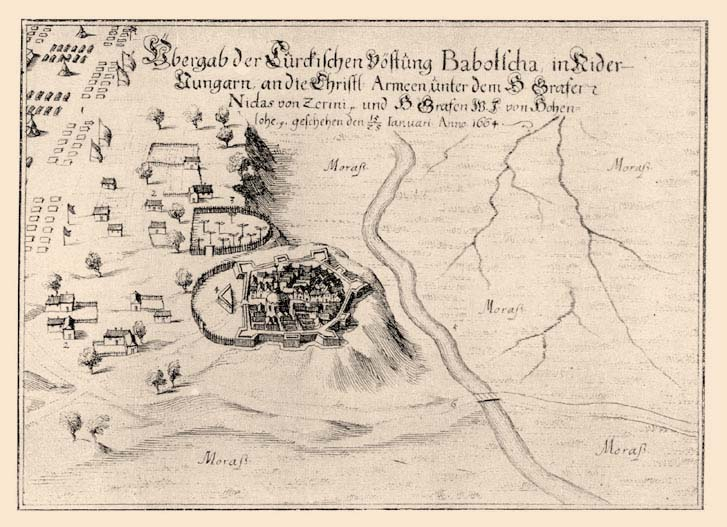
Castle of Babócsa in 1664 by Samu Borovszky (1914)
