= NuTonomy =

Technology startup company

- Company type: Subsidiary
- Industry: Transportation, automotive
- Founded: 2013
- Founder: Karl Iagnemma (CEO); Emilio Frazzoli (CTO)
- Headquarters: Cambridge, Massachusetts, United States
- Area served: Singapore, Boston, Las Vegas
- Key people: Doug Parker (COO)
- Products: Self-driving cars, automation
- Number of employees: 11-50 (2015)
- Parent: Aptiv
- Website: nutonomy.com (discontinued)

NuTonomy (stylized as nuTonomy) was an MIT spin-off technology startup company that made software to build self-driving cars and autonomous mobile robots. The company was founded in 2013. In August 2016, it launched its robo-taxi service (pilot project) in Singapore. In October 2017, Delphi Automotive (now Aptiv) purchased the company, which then became part of the Motional autonomous driving joint venture between Aptiv and Hyundai Motor Group.

== History ==
NuTonomy began testing its software on cars in early 2016. One of the cars used to test its software included Mitsubishi i-MiEV. The product is still in research and development phase.

In August 2016, it launched its autonomous taxi service using a fleet of 6 modified Renault Zoes and Mitsubishi i-MiEVs.

NuTonomy later signed three significant partnerships to develop its technology and service: with Grab, with Groupe PSA, which is supposed to provide the company with Peugeot 3008 SUVs, and the last one with Lyft to launch a Robo-Taxi service in Boston.

In October 2017, Delphi Automotive (now Aptiv) purchased the company.

== Technology ==
NuTonomy-fitted cars use "formal logic" to decide motion, maneuverability, and speed. The software guides a car on how to plan its motion through an environment.
