= Drive Capital =

American venture capital firm

- Type: Private
- Industry: Venture capital
- Founded: 2013
- Founder: Mark Kvamme, Chris Olsen
- Headquarters: Columbus, Ohio, US
- Area served: United States and Canada
- Total assets: $1.2 billion
- Website: drivecapital.com

Drive Capital is a venture capital firm headquartered in Columbus, Ohio.

== History ==
Drive Capital was founded in 2013 by Mark Kvamme and Chris Olsen, both formerly of Sequoia Capital. The firm primarily invests in tech startups outside Silicon Valley. Drive Capital has invested in various companies based in the United States and Canada.

The firm's investments include Root Insurance Company, Duolingo, Olive, Greenlight, Civis Analytics, Udacity, Path Robotics, and Vecna Robotics. The organization's programs focus on establishing entrepreneurial ecosystems with a goal to support new businesses and solidify a base of operation in the midwestern United States, rather than refocusing financial investment opportunities outside the region.

In February 2014, the firm established its first $250 million venture capital fund, Drive Capital Fund I. In September 2016, the firm began investing from its second $300 million fund. In January 2020, the firm established its first $301 million expansion stage fund, Overdrive Fund I. The four funds bring the firms assets under management to $1.2 billion.
