= VGo Communications =

VGo Communications, Inc. was founded in 2007 by Grinnell More, Tim Root and Thomas Ryden. It is located in Nashua, NH. VGo Communications has developed the VGo Robotic Telpresence Device, which it began selling in 2010.

Vecna acquired VGo in 2015 and moved its operations to Massachusetts.

== VGo Robotic Telepresence Device ==
The VGo Robotic Telepresence Device is a robot that is remotely controlled by a person with a laptop. Using the keyboard or mouse, the remote person controls the robot and is able to hear and see from his perspective, as well as move it around.

Students with severe allergies or whom are chronically ill can attend school using VGo. At the end of the 2012-13 school year, more than 40 students were using a VGo to attend school remotely.

Children's Hospital Boston is sending home some of their patients with a VGo for remote patient monitoring.

Palomar Hospital is using VGo to allow distant family members to visit with patients, and be part of care planning discussions.
