= Motional =

American autonomous vehicle company

- Type: Private
- Industry: Automotive
- Predecessors: Aptiv; NuTonomy; Ottomatika
- Founded: 2020; 6 years ago
- Headquarters: Boston, Massachusetts, United States
- Key people: CEO Laura Major
- Products: Autonomous vehicle technology
- Website: www.motional.com

Motional is an American autonomous vehicle company founded in March 2020 as a joint venture between automaker Hyundai Motor Group and auto supplier Aptiv. Headquartered in Boston, Massachusetts, Motional also maintains operations in Pittsburgh, Singapore, Las Vegas, and Los Angeles. Motional began testing its newest generation of vehicles in Las Vegas, Nevada, in February 2021, and also operates vehicles in Pittsburgh and Santa Monica, California.

== Name ==
'Motional' is a portmanteau of motion and emotional, with motion referring to the movement of self-driving cars and emotional expressing the willingness to realize the value of human respect.

== History ==
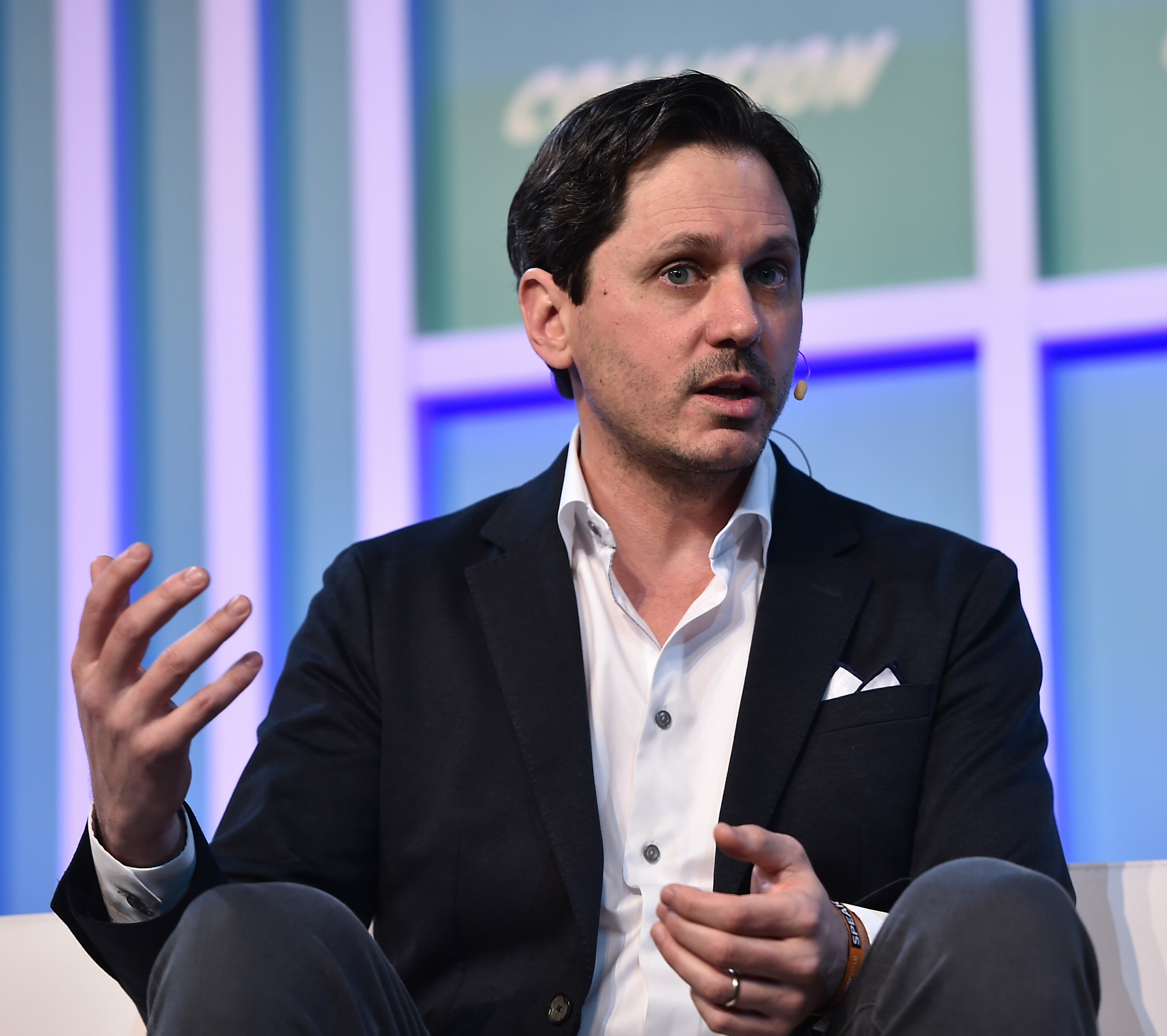
Karl Iagnemma at the Collision conference in 2018

- 2013 - nuTonomy and Ottomatika, Inc. are established as spin-offs at Massachusetts Institute of Technology and Carnegie Mellon University.
- 2015 - Delphi acquired Ottomatika
- 2015 - Delphi demonstrates what they claim to be America's first fully autonomous transcontinental crossing.
- 2016 - nuTonomy trial operated the world's first autonomous taxi in Singapore.
- 2017 - nuTonomy begins autonomous driving in Boston
- 2017 - Delphi acquired nuTonomy
- 2017 - Delphi renamed as Aptiv
- 2018 - Aptiv acquired NuTonomy and Ottomatika and formed an Autonomous Driving Team
- 2018 - First public robotaxi service tests in Las Vegas in collaboration with Lyft, with 50,000 rides in the first year
- 2019 - Aptiv & Hyundai Motor Group officially announce an autonomous driving joint venture
- 2020 - The establishment of Motional, an autonomous driving technology development joint venture
- 2021 - Autonomous (SAE level 4) vehicle test drive successful on normal roads
- 2022 - Motional and Lyft's public service is launched in Las Vegas using autonomous, all-electric Hyundai Ioniq 5 vehicles with a safety driver
- 2022 - Motional and Lyft announced the planned launch of a fully driverless ride-hail service in Los Angeles

Karl Iagnemma, founder of NuTonomy, was CEO of Motional. In September 2024 Karl stepped down as CEO of Motional. Currently Laura Major is the president and CEO of Motional as of 2025.

== Services ==
Service areas in the United States
State	Metro area	Status	Launch date	Ref.
Nevada	Las Vegas	Safety-driver service with Uber	2026	

== Finances ==
Motional is majority owned by Hyundai Motor Group. In 2024, Motional completed a $475M funding round with Hyundai.
