= Nicolas Born =

German writer

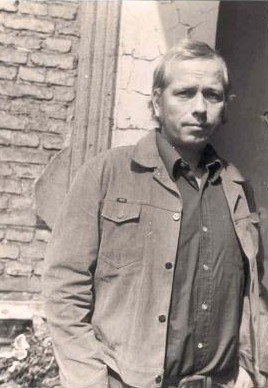
Nicolas Born

Nicolas Born (31 December 1937 in Duisburg – 7 December 1979 in Lüchow-Dannenberg) was a German writer.

Nicolas Born was – together with Rolf Dieter Brinkmann – one of the most important and most innovative German poets of his generation. His two novels, Die erdabgewandte Seite der Geschichte, and Die Fälschung, have been translated into more than a dozen languages, and count among the most important works of German literature of the 1970s.

== Life and works ==
Nicolas Born grew up in a lower-middle-class family in the Ruhrgebiet. He worked making printing accessories in a chemical process for a large printing company in Essen, until he was able – with the help of a first literary prize, the Förderpreis Nordrhein-Westfalen, for his first novel, "Der Zweite Tag" – to go to Berlin, and live from writing. He was an autodidact, and with his poems and novel scripts, soon gathered enough attention from known writers and critics like Ernst Meister, Johannes Bobrowski, Günter Grass, and Hans Bender, to get a scholarship for the renowned Berliner Literarisches Colloquium in Berlin in 1963/1964, where he met other young writers like Hans Christoph Buch, Hermann Peter Piwitt, Hubert Fichte, Peter Bichsel, and others, and was taught by Günter Grass, Uwe Johnson, Peter Rühmkorf, Peter Weiss, and others. In preparation for his stay at the Iowa International Writers Workshop in Iowa City in 1969/1970, Born read more and more contemporary American poets. In Iowa, he met Charles Bukowski, Anselm Hollo, Ted Berrigan, and many others, was friends with John Batki, Allen Ginsberg, Eric Torgersen, Tom Raworth and others. In the renowned "red frame"-series, "Das neue Buch", Born published, in 1972, his third collection of poems, "Das Auge des Entdeckers" (The eye of the explorer), largely influenced by contemporary American poetry, utopian literature, and a more relaxed perspective on political effectiveness of literature that was commonly known among the politically left-oriented colleagues of his generation. The book was a great success, selling very well for a poetry-collection, and made Born together with Rolf Dieter Brinkmann one of the most important and innovative poets of his generation in Germany.

Back in Germany, Born started translating the poems of Kenneth Koch for Rowohlt Verlag, which was published, only in 1973, in the same Rowohlt-series "Das neue Buch". His novels, Die erdabgewandte Seite der Geschichte (1976, Rowohlt Verlag, translated in more than a dozen languages), and even more Die Fälschung (1979, "The Deception"), which was published shortly before his early death, in 1979, from cancer, were even bigger successes, and made him one of the most important and well known left wing intellectuals of his time. His political engagements against nuclear power, and what he called the "mad-system of reality", and the "world of the machine", were not only published in magazines, but also largely discussed in television shows of the time. Die Fälschung, was posthumously filmed as Circle of Deceit (1981); directed by Volker Schloendorff, it starred Bruno Ganz, Hanna Schygulla, and Jerzy Skolimowski.

Together with Peter Handke, and Michael Krüger, he was a jury member of the European literary Petrarca-Preis, from when the award was founded in 1975, and onto his death.

== Nicolas Born revival in 2004 ==
Twenty five years after his death, his youngest daughter, Katharina Born reedited an almost complete and critical collection of his poems, including several unpublished works: Nicolas Born - Gedichte (Wallstein 2004). For the book, Born received (for the first time posthumously), the renowned Peter Huchel Prize (2005). After the big success of the poetry collection and many positive reviews and reactions, a collection of Born's correspondence is planned for Spring 2007.

== Selected works in German ==
- Das Auge des Entdeckers; Gedichte (1972)
- Entsorgt: für Bariton solo, 1989; music by Aribert Reimann (1989)
- Die erdabgewandte Seite der Geschichte: Roman (1976) ISBN 3-498-00444-1
- The Four Bremen City Musicians; compiled by Hans-Joachim Gelberg, illustrated by Willi Glasauer (1976) ISBN 3-407-80518-7
- Die Fälschung: Roman (1979) ISBN 3-498-00455-7
- Gedichte: 1967–1978 (1978) ISBN 3-498-00449-2
- Marktlage. Gedichte (1967)
- Metsi'ut medumah; translated by Avraham Ḳadimah (1982) ISBN 965-19-0118-7
- Täterskizzen: Erzählungen (1983) ISBN 3-498-00481-6
- Die Welt der Maschine: Aufsätze und Reden; edited by Rolf Haufs (1980) ISBN 3-498-00462-X (pbk.)
- Wo mir der Kopf steht. Gedichte (1970)
- Der zweite Tag. Roman (1965)
- Gedichte. (2004)

== Works in English ==
- The Deception; translated by Leila Vennewitz (1983) ISBN 0-316-10273-3

Eric Torgersen translated a collection of his poems from his first two collections, Marktlage (1967, Kiepenheuer & Witsch), and Wo mir der Kopf steht (1970, Kiepenheuer & Witsch), which so far has only been partly published. In Dimension, his long "Feriengedicht" has been first published in German, and English. Other translations are planned for 2007.

== Translated poems in English ==
by Eric Torgersen (more planned)

"Subscription", "Inheritance", Iowa Review 7, 2–3, Spring-Summer 1976 (reissued in book form as Writing from Around the World, University of Iowa Press, 1976).

"Finally, There's Nothing More to Lose", "In the Morning on Monday", First Issue 9, Fall-Winter 1974–75.

"Bride and Groom", Kamadhenu II, 1–2, 1971.

"Case", "Bottles", "Self-Portrait", "Ethos", Doones I, 4, 1971.

"Signs", Greenfield Review 1, Spring 1970.

"Infidelity", "Refrain", "For the Poor Devil Manfred Bock", "My God I Thought", "How Many Sons", "Washing Windows", "Confidence", "A Love", Modern Poetry in Translation, London, 6, 1970.

translated by Mark Terrill:

The Bill for Room 11, a foldout broadside of 10 poems published by Longhouse, 2008

== See also ==
- Official webpages of Nicolas Born
- Nicolas Born at perlentaucher.de – das Kulturmagazin (in German)
