= Karl Iagnemma =

American writer and research scientist

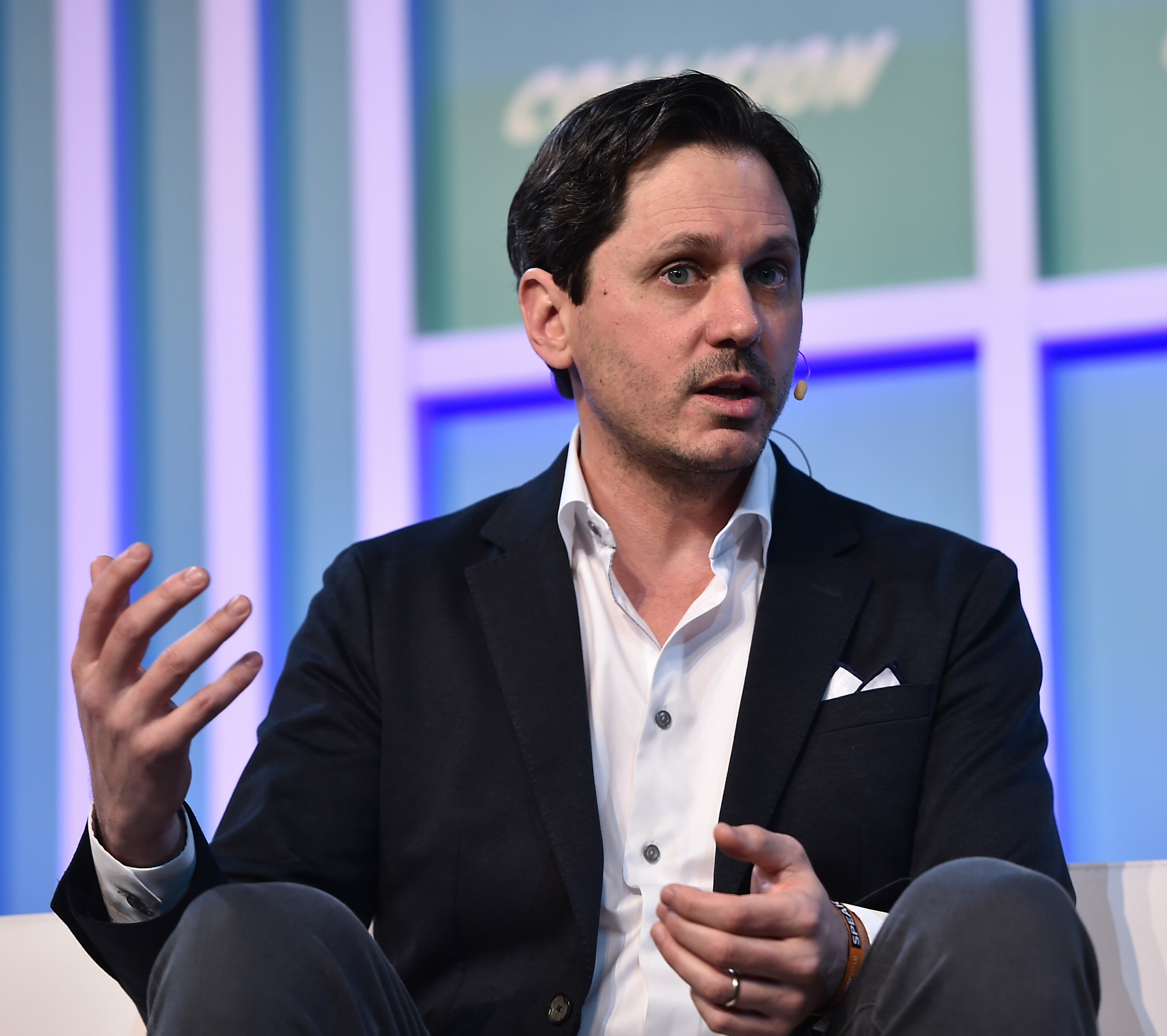
Iagnemma at the Collision conference in 2018

Karl Iagnemma (born October 19, 1972) is an American writer and research scientist. He was the CEO of self-driving technology company Motional. He is now the CEO of Vecna Robotics.

== Background ==
Iagnemma was born in Shelby Township, Michigan, a suburb of Detroit. He studied mechanical engineering at the University of Michigan.

He received a PhD in mechanical engineering in 2001 from the Massachusetts Institute of Technology.

=== Career ===
In 2013, Iagnemma founded NuTonomy. In October 2017, he sold the company to Delphi Automotive for $400 million. In September 2024 he stepped down as CEO of Motional. In November 2024, he is the CEO of Vecna Robotics.

== Short fiction ==
Iagnemma has published a collection of short stories, On the Nature of Human Romantic Interaction (2003), which features many stories about the more human aspects of scientists/mathematicians, where the protagonists are trapped between decisions of the heart and the rational way. His short stories have appeared in the Paris Review, Tin House, and Zoetrope, and have been anthologized in the Best American Short Stories and the Pushcart Prize collections.

He won the Paris Review Discovery Prize for his short story, On the Nature of Human Romantic Interaction - which is also the title short story of his 2003 debut short story collection - and was initially published in the Paris Review and reprinted in The Pushcart Prize 2003: Best of the Small Presses. Iagnemma additionally won the Paris Review Plimpton Prize in 2002. Iagnemma also won the Playboy College Fiction Contest for his short story, A Little Advance, published in the November 1998 issue of Playboy magazine (originally entitled Nativity). The On the Nature short story collection has been optioned by Warner Brothers.

== Novels and books ==
Iagnemma's first novel is entitled The Expeditions (2007), and concerns the story of an estranged father and his son’s voyages throughout the wilderness of 19th-century Michigan, specifically during the year 1844.

Iagnemma also has published a monograph on robotics from his research at MIT entitled Mobile Robots in Rough Terrain: Estimation, Motion Planning, and Control with Application to Planetary Rovers (2004).

== Bibliography ==
=== Short stories ===
- A Little Advance (originally Nativity), November 1998, Playboy Magazine
  - Winner of the 1998 Playboy College Fiction Contest
- On The Nature of Human Romantic Interaction, The Paris Review No. 157, Winter 2000.
  - Reprinted in The Pushcart Prize 2003: Best of the Small Presses
  - Recipient of the 2001 Paris Review Discovery Prize
- The Confessional Approach, The Paris Review No, 160, Winter 2001.
- Zilkowski's Theorem , Zoetrope: All-Story, Vol. 5, No. 3, Fall 2001.
  - Reprinted in Best American Short Stories 2002
- The Phrenologist's Dream , Zoetrope: All-Story, Vol. 7, No. 1, Spring 2003.
- The Indian Agent, Meridian, Issue 8, Fall/Winter 2001.
- The Ore Miner's Wife, The Virginia Quarterly Review, Spring 2002.
- Children of Hunger, One Story, Issue 18, March 30, 2003.
- Kingdom, Order, Species, The Antioch Review, Spring 2003.

=== Short story collections ===
- On The Nature of Human Romantic Interaction (2003)

=== Novels ===
- The Expeditions (2007)

=== Non-fiction books/monographs ===
- Mobile Robots in Rough Terrain: Estimation, Motion Planning, and Control with Application to Planetary Rovers (2004)

== Awards ==
- Playboy College Fiction Contest (1998)
- Paris Review Plimpton Prize (2000)
- Paris Review Discovery Prize (2001)
