= Mark Terrill =

American poet (born 1953)

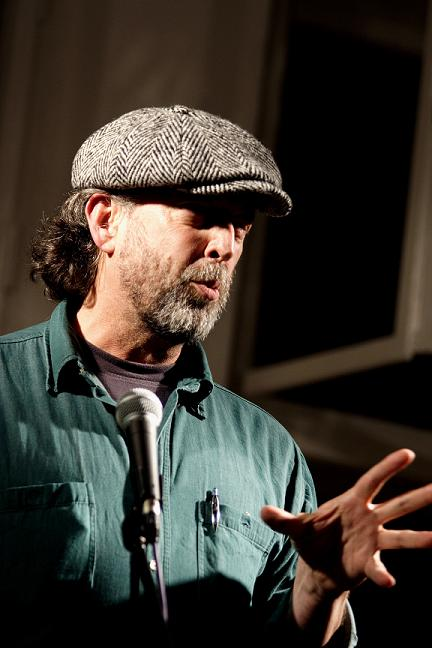
Terrill at the Berlin Poetry Hearings (2006). Photo by Stephen Mooney

Mark Terrill (born 1953) is an American poet, translator, and prose writer who has resided in Northern Germany since the mid-1980s.

== Biography ==
Born on July 1, 1953, in Berkeley, California, Mark Terrill grew up in the unincorporated mountain community of Sky Londa in San Mateo County, south of San Francisco. After failing to complete high school, he traveled widely in the Pacific Northwest and Alaska, working as a dishwasher, woodcutter, gardener, bartender, taxi driver, gravedigger, sawmill worker, deckhand, and welder before finally obtaining his seaman’s papers and shipping out of San Francisco to the Far East and beyond. In 1982, he attended the School of Visual Arts Writing Workshop conducted by Paul Bowles in Tangier, Morocco, and after extensive travels throughout Morocco and Europe, finally settled in Hamburg, Germany, in 1984. Simultaneously with pursuing his literary activities, he has been employed as a shipyard welder, road manager for various rock bands (American Music Club, Mekons, etc.), cook, and postal worker. He currently lives on the grounds of a former boatyard near Hamburg.

== Writing ==
Terrill began writing in the early 1970s. His first poems appeared in Vagabond, a small-press magazine published by John Bennett that featured the work of Charles Bukowski, Jack Micheline, D. A. Levy, Al Masarik, and many others. Since then, Terrill’s writings and translations have appeared in over one thousand journals and anthologies worldwide, including City Lights Review, Denver Quarterly, Bombay Gin, Skanky Possum, Zen Monster, Talisman, Partisan Review, Gargoyle, Rattle and others. He has published several full-length collections, chapbooks, and broadsides of his poetry, prose, and translations with numerous small-press publishers in the USA and Europe. A four-time Pushcart Prize nominee, his work has been translated into Portuguese, French, and German. For over ten years, he was a regular contributor to Rain Taxi Review of Books, and in 2009 he was invited to guest-edit a special German Poetry issue of the Atlanta Review, which also featured his own translations of Peter Handke, Günter Grass, Nicolas Born, Rolf Dieter Brinkmann and many others. In addition, his translations of the poetry of Rolf Dieter Brinkmann have been assembled in two full-length book collections, along with appearing elsewhere.

Terrill has read/performed his work in Paris at Shakespeare & Co., The Live Poets Society, Upstairs at Duroc and the American Library; in Berlin at the Poetry Hearings (2006 and 2010) and the International Slam Revue; in Prague at Shakespeare & Sons and The Globe; in Amsterdam at the Sugar Factory, Boekie Woekie and the Fiery Tongues Literary Festival. Together with the poet Cralan Kelder, he co-edited the poetry journal Full Metal Poem, which has published work by Ron Padgett, John Wieners, Joanne Kyger, Cid Corman, Bob Arnold, F.A. Nettelbeck, Louise Landes Levi and others.

Terrill's papers are housed in the Special Collections of the University of Delaware Library.

== Bibliography ==
Collections of poetry and prose:

- Subliminal Madness (Triton Press, 1978)
- Sorry Try Again (Red Dancefloor Press, 1998)
- Love-Hate Continuum (Green Bean Press, 2001), ISBN 1-891408-18-6
- Kid with Gray Eyes (Cedar Hill Publications, 2001), ISBN 1-891812-28-9
- Bread & Fish (The Figures, 2002), ISBN 1-930589-14-X
- The United Colors of Death (Pathwise Press, 2003)
- Postcard from Mount Sumeru (Bottle of Smoke Press, 2006)
- Sending Off the Godhead in the City of Light (Hydrogen Jukebox Press, 2006)
- 17 Poems for the Poetry Hearings (Hydrogen Jukebox Press, 2006)
- Something Red (Plan B Press, 2007)
- Superabundance (Longhouse, 2008)
- The Salvador-Dalai-Lama Express (Main Street Rag, 2009), ISBN 978-1-59948-157-9
- Laughing Butcher Berlin Blues (Poetry Salzburg, 2010), ISBN 978-3-901993-33-6
- The Spleen of Madrid, collaborative poems with Francis Poole (Feral Press, 2012)
- A Pair of Darts, collaboration with Francis Poole (Feral Press, 2012)
- Change Remains Suspended (Feral Press, 2013)
- Down at the Gate (Feral Press, 2013)
- The Travelers (Feral Press, 2014)
- Any Number at All (Feral Press, 2016)
- Diamonds & Sapience (Dark Style, 2017)
- Competitive Decadence (New Feral Press, 2017)
- Great Balls of Doubt (Verse Chorus Press, 2020), ISBN 978-1-891241-66-6
- Disrupting Dystopia (New Feral Press, 2020)
- Reframing Oblivion (New Feral Press, 2021)
- The Undying Guest (Spuyten Duyvil, 2023), ISBN 978-1-959556-08-4
- Days of Judgment (Moloko Print 307, 2026), ISBN 978-3-911820-23-3

Broadsides and folios:

- Interzone (Bottle of Smoke Press, 2006)
- Out-the-Window Poems (Bottle of Smoke Press, 2006)
- The Wheel (Kater Murr’s Press, 2010)
- Up All Night (Longhouse, 2011)
- A Poem for Radios (Fact-Simile Editions, 2012)
- The Other Side (Longhouse, 2012)
- Masking Up (Cold Turkey Press, 2022)
- Mirror Ablaze/Dream Thing (Cold Turkey Press, 2022)
- Some People (Cold Turkey Press, 2023)

Fiction:

- Ultrazone: A Tangier Ghost Story, collaboration with Francis Poole (Verse Chorus Press, 2022), ISBN 978-1-959163-11-4

Nonfiction:

- Here to Learn: Remembering Paul Bowles (Green Bean Press, 2002), ISBN 1-891408-29-1
- Here to Learn: Remembering Paul Bowles deluxe bilingual (English/German) edition (Moloko Print 176, 2023), ISBN 978-3-948750-82-4

Translations:

- Rolf Dieter Brinkmann: Like a Pilot, Selected Poems 1963-1970 (Sulphur River Literary Review Press, 2001), ISBN 0-9657687-7-5
- Whispering Villages: Seven German Poets (Longhouse, 2006)
- Nicolas Born: The Bill for Room 11 (Longhouse, 2008)
- Rolf Dieter Brinkmann: Some Very Popular Songs (Toad Press, 2009)
- Rolf Dieter Brinkmann: Under Glass (Longhouse, 2010)
- Jörg Fauser: An Evening in Europe (Toad Press, 2011)
- Rolf Dieter Brinkmann: An Unchanging Blue, Selected Poems 1962-1975 (Parlor Press / Free Verse Editions, 2011), ISBN 978-1-60235-198-1
- Thomas Brasch: The Murdered Poet (Cold Turkey Press, 2022)
- Thomas Brasch: Kottbusser Tor (Cold Turkey Press, 2022)
- Gregory Corso: The Muse (Moloko Print / Cold Turkey Press, 2022), ISBN 978-3-948750-88-6
- Lewis Warsh: Ein Platz an der Sonne (Moloko Print 195, 2023), ISBN 978-3-910431-02-7

Anthology appearances:

- Ends & Beginnings, City Lights Review #6, edited by Lawrence Ferlinghetti (City Lights Books, 1994), ISBN 0-87286-292-5
- Beers, Bars and Breakdowns, edited by Scott Gordon (Staplegun Press, 2000)
- Fake City Syndrome, edited by Kate Gale & Charles Rammelkamp (Red Hen Press, 2002), ISBN 1-888996-60-9
- Nixon Under the Bodhi Tree and Other Works of Buddhist Fiction, edited by Kate Wheeler (Wisdom Publications, 2004), ISBN 978-0-86171-354-7
- Babylon Burning; 9/11 Five Years On, edited by Todd Swift (nthposition press, 2006)
- Babel Tour (Université Paris Sorbonne-Paris IV, 2008), ISBN 978-2-9512407-8-0
- Last Call: The Bukowski Legacy Continues, edited by RD Armstrong (Lummox Press, 2011), ISBN 978-1-929878-86-4
- From a Terrace in Prague, edited by Stephan Delbos (Literaria Pragensia, 2011), ISBN 978-80-7308-349-6
- Haiku 21, edited by Lee Gurga & Scott Metz (Modern Haiku Press, 2011), ISBN 978-0974189451
- Bukowski: An Anthology of Poetry & Prose About Charles Bukowski, edited by Melanie Villines (Silver Birch Press, 2013), ISBN 978-0615845494
- NOON: An Anthology of Short Poems, edited by Philip Rowland (Isobar Press, 2019), ISBN 978-4-907359-26-3
- The Best Small Fictions 2020, series editor; Nathan Leslie (Sonder Press, 2020), ISBN 978-0-9997501-9-3

As Editor:

- Atlanta Review: Germany (Vol. XV, No. 2, 2009)
- Full Metal Poem (#1, 2010, together with co-editor Cralan Kelder)

== Quotes on Terrill ==
Poet, author and art critic Lawrence Ferlinghetti says, “Mark Terrill, the true poet and ‘forlorn observer’ of the world he sees as essentially forlorn, if not absurd, if not entirely hopeless, and nothing on the end of his fork to really wax ecstatic about. But his poetry is far from hopeless. It is a hard light to alleviate the situation of the world as he sees it.”

“I’ve always liked your poetry; it has a steady, stripped-down rhythm to it. Little pings of microscopic truth.” - John Bennett
