= Battlefield Extraction-Assist Robot =

Humanoid military robot

The Battlefield Extraction-Assist Robot (BEAR) is a remotely controlled robot developed by Vecna Robotics for use in the extraction of wounded soldiers from the battlefield with no risk to human life. The humanoid robot uses a powerful hydraulics system to carry humans and other heavy objects over long distances and rough terrain, such as stairs.

Work on the robot commenced in 2005 and it was featured in Time Magazine's Best Inventions of 2006. Kenny Robotics wrapped up development and testing for applications on and off of the battlefield in 2011.

== Features and technology ==
The BEAR is a six-feet-tall, remotely controlled, humanoid robot, powered by a hydraulic actuator. Its steel torso is capable of the maximum hydraulic exertion of 3,000 psi (21,000 kPa). It can lift 500 pounds (230 kg).

=== Controls ===
The initial versions of the BEAR were remotely controlled by a human operator who was able to see and hear through the robot's sensors. Developments to the BEAR's AI have given the robot the ability to process higher level commands given by an operator such as "go to this location" or "pick up that box." If the robot is unable to execute the operator's command, it asks the operator for assistance to complete a task.

A soldier may also control the BEAR through a device known as the iGlove. The motion-capture glove, which AnthroTronix has developed, allows the soldier to make a simple hand gesture to command the BEAR. Another remote control for the BEAR is called the Mounted Force Controller. It's a specialized rifle grip mounted on an M4 carbine so soldiers can continue to command the BEAR without putting down their weapon.

=== Actuators ===
The BEAR is powered through a hydraulic actuator which gives the robot the ability to lift 500 pounds. The hydraulic actuator is controlled by solenoids that turn the hydraulic valves on and off to make the robot move. The BEAR's tracked legs are electronically powered. The battery pack powers the tracked legs for up to an hour. Further developments to the battery pack should double its capacity and give the BEAR's tracked legs two hours of run time.

=== Sensors ===
The latest version of the BEAR robot has infrared, night vision, and optical cameras as well as a microphone.

Later developments include:

- Touch and pressure sensors on the BEAR's hands
- Chemical and biological agent detection sensors

=== Features ===
The BEAR's strong hands are precise enough to grasp an egg without breaking it. Vecna's roboticists designed the robot with a teddy bear face to provide those being rescued comfort and reassurance. Dynamic Balance Behavior (DBB) technology gives the BEAR the ability to maintain balance in any position even while carrying heavy objects.

== Development history ==
Vecna Robotics began developing the Battlefield Extraction-Assist Robot in 2005 at its Cambridge Research Laboratory near Boston, Massachusetts.

The BEAR's technology and features have improved since its early stages of development. The BEAR went through nine stages of development. Numerous features were added since the BEAR's early stages, including:

- Explosion and fire-resistant treads
- Explosion and fire-resistant battery
- Enhanced dexterity
- Improved lift capacity from the initial 360 lb (160 kg) to 520 lb (240 kg)
- Aluminum frame replaced with steel frame (4× stronger)
- Independent legs for enhanced mobility
- Steel framing around the hydraulic lines and battery

=== Project funding ===
The BEAR project's primary funding source has been from Vecna's internal research and development funds. External sources of funding come from the U.S. Army, the Navy, the Air Force, and DARPA. The project also has numerous sponsors including Hydro-Force, Microchip and National Instruments. In 2007, U.S. Congress approved a $1 million grant for the project.

=== Testing ===
The BEAR has been tested at Fort Benning, Georgia at the U.S. Army Infantry Center Maneuver Battle Lab with soldiers. In 2010, soldiers worked with the robot to develop tactics and test its effectiveness in combat scenarios.

== Applications ==
The BEAR can carry a wounded soldier far away from a hazardous environment to a place where a medic can assess their injuries safely without risk to the medic's life. The BEAR is slim enough to fit through doors and the BEAR's tracks enable it to climb stairs.

Other applications of the BEAR include:

- Search & rescue
- Transporting supplies
- Clearing obstacles
- Lifting heavy objects
- Handling hazardous materials
- Reconnaissance
- Inspecting for mines and IEDs

== Robots similar to the BEAR ==
- Armored Combat Engineer Robot
- BigDog
- Dragon Runner
- MARCbot
- MATILDA (Military robot)
- Multifunctional utility/logistics and equipment vehicle
- PackBot
- Remotec ANDROS
