= Vecna Technologies =

American healthcare information technology company

Vecna Technologies, Inc.
- Type: Private
- Industry: Healthcare IT, Software, Consulting
- Founded: 1998
- Headquarters: Cambridge, MA
- Products: The Patient Information Exchange (patient self-service), QC PathFinder (electronic infection surveillance software), VGo (telepresence)
- Website: www.vecna.com

Vecna Technologies is a healthcare information technology company with products including the Patient Information Exchange and QC PathFinder. It shares its origin with an independent sister company Vecna Robotics that develops and applies robotics technology to logistics and industrial markets.

== History ==
Vecna was founded in 1998 by MIT alumni Deborah and Daniel Theobald to provide consulting and systems integration services to the United States Military Health System and the Department of Veterans Affairs. The company name is derived from the feminine form of the Czech word věčný. The company has offices in Cambridge, Massachusetts. The Greenbelt, Maryland location closed in 2019.

In 2011, the Small Business Administration selected Vecna as one of 44 recipients of the Tibbetts Award for driving innovation and creating jobs. The Massachusetts Alliance for Economic Development awarded the company with the Gold Massachusetts Economic Impact Award for Greater Boston in 2012. The Robotics Business Review named Vecna one of the top 50 robotics companies to watch in 2015. That same year, the company received the Kinetic Process Innovation Award for providing patient self-service technology to Boulder Community Hospital. Additionally, the Boston Business Journal recognized Vecna among the Top 100 Women-Led Businesses in Massachusetts in 2012, 2014, and 2021.

Vecna acquired telepresence robot manufacturer VGo Communications in 2015, relocating its operations from Nashua, New Hampshire, to Cambridge. In 2019, the company split into two independent companies: Vecna Robotics, based in Cambridge, and Vecna Healthcare, based in Burlington, Massachusetts.

== Products ==
=== Patient Information Exchange ===
Vecna provides a patient self-service system with modules for pre-registration, onsite registration, queuing, clinical messaging, e-forms, and business intelligence. Users can access this platform via healthcare kiosks, personal computers, and mobile devices to review their demographic information, verify insurance coverage, pay bills, and check in. Patients who register online can check in using a barcode.

The system's patient kiosk has received an endorsement from the American Hospital Association, and is used within Veterans Affairs medical centers across the United States.

=== QC PathFinder ===
QC PathFinder is an infection surveillance software application. It automatically alerts healthcare professionals of healthcare-acquired infections (HAIs) and pharmacy-related safety events. It also facilitates reporting infections to the Centers for Disease Control and Prevention's National Healthcare Safety Network (NHSN). It also generates institutional antibiograms that inform clinicians on appropriate antimicrobial choices for pathogens within their hospital.

=== VGo ===
Acquired by Vecna in 2015, VGo is a robotic telepresence device. It allows remote users to navigate an environment and interact with individuals at that location. The technology is used across the education, healthcare, and business sectors.

== Research ==
Vecna's research and development for both its robotics and healthcare information technology projects has been funded by federal and state government grants and contracts. This funding supported projects involving robotics platforms, infection control, antimicrobial stewardship, computer vision, machine learning, underwater tool systems, and web applications for pathogen surveillance and consulting time management.

=== Bear Robot ===
Vecna Robotics, a sister entity, developed the Battlefield Extraction-Assist Robot (The Bear™). The Bear is outfitted with infrared cameras, supports remote operation, and was originally designed to rescue wounded soldiers from the battlefield.

== Vecna Cares ==
Vecna provides intellectual property to the Vecna Cares Charitable Trust to support the development of CliniPAK, an electronic medical record system designed for rural and underserved communities. CliniPAK is a mobile health record system that includes a server and a solar charger. Vecna Cares operates as a 501(c)(3) non-profit organization.
