= Rolf Dieter Brinkmann =

German writer (1940–1975)

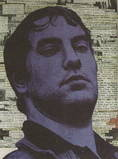
- Born: 16 April 1940; Vechta, Oldenburg, Germany
- Died: 23 April 1975 (aged 35); London, England
- Occupations: Poet, novelist

Rolf Dieter Brinkmann (16 April 1940 – 23 April 1975) was a German writer of poems, short stories, a novel, essays, letters, and diaries.

== Life and work ==
Rolf Dieter Brinkmann is considered an important forerunner of the German so-called Pop-Literatur. He published nine books of poems in the 1960s, dealing with the appearance of the present culture and the sensual experience of active subjectivity. During that period he also wrote Keiner weiß mehr (Nobody knows anymore), a novel of modern family life. His early prose was inspired by the French nouveau roman. The precision of description of this style never left him, but merged in his poetry with influences from Gottfried Benn and William Carlos Williams, Frank O'Hara, and Ted Berrigan. In 1972/73 Brinkmann was a recipient of a fellowship at the German Academy Villa Massimo in Rome. His sensibility and the despair of civilisation permeating Rom, Blicke and the other posthumously published prose writings goes deep. The spring of 1974 he was a visiting lecturer at the German Department of University of Texas at Austin.

On April 23, 1975, after a reading at Cambridge Poetry Festival Brinkmann was killed in London when he was hit by a car on his way to dinner with Jürgen Theobaldy.

He was posthumously awarded the Petrarca-Preis in 1975 for his major and highly praised and influential last book of poetry Westwärts 1 & 2 (1975). In 2005 a new expanded edition of this book was published with 26 longer poems finally added as well as a 75 pages long postscript by the author. These parts were reluctantly excluded from the first edition by Brinkmann as the publisher thought the book was too extensive.

In 2025, Frank Xerox’ wüster Traum, a collaboration with Ralf-Rainer Rygulla, was published by Dielmann-Verlag.

== Selected works ==
- Frank Xerox’ wüster Traum (in collaboration with Ralf-Rainer Rygulla) ISBN 978-3-86638-469-9
- vorstellung meiner hände (2010) ISBN 978-3-498-00667-9
- Briefe an Hartmut 1974–1975 (1999) ISBN 3-498-00608-8
- Schnitte. (1988) ISBN 3-498-00525-1
- Erkundungen für die Präzisierung des Gefühls für einen Aufstand : Träume, Aufstände, Gewalt, Morde : Reise, Zeit, Magazin : die Story ist schnell erzählt (Tagebuch) (1987) ISBN 3-499-25169-8
- Erzählungen (1985) ISBN 3-498-00493-X
- Der Film in Worten : Prosa, Erzählungen, Essays, Hörspiele, Fotos, Collagen, 1965–1974 (1982) ISBN 3-498-00469-7
- Standphotos. Gedichte 1962–1970 (1980) ISBN 3-498-00461-1
- Rom, Blicke. (1979) ISBN 3-499-25094-2
- Westwärts 1 & 2. (1975) ISBN 3-499-25063-2 ISBN 3-498-00528-6 (pbk.)
- Keiner weiß mehr. (1968)

== English translations ==
- Like a Pilot: Rolf Dieter Brinkmann, Selected Poems, 1963–1970; translated by Mark Terrill (Sulphur River Literary Review Press, 2001) ISBN 0-9657687-7-5
- Some Very Popular Songs, one long poem from Westwärts 1 & 2, translated by Mark Terrill (Toad Press, 2010).
- Under Glass, a foldout broadsheet of 13 poems, translated by Mark Terrill (Longhouse, 2010).
- An Unchanging Blue, Selected Poems 1962–1975, trans. Mark Terrill (Parlor Press, 2011), 222 p. ISBN 1-60235-198-8
- Long poem Some Very Popular Songs, trans. Mark Terrill, published in B O D Y

== Bibliography ==
- John MacKay, Inscription and Modernity: From Wordsworth to Mandelstam (Bloomington: Indiana University Press, 2006), esp. pp. 28– 34. ISBN 0-253-34749-1
