= Deibel =

Deibel is a German surname, a phonetic variant of Deubel. Its main origin is a nickname literally meaning "devil" for a ruthless person. Notable people with the name include:

- Art Deibel (1896–1984), American professional football player
- August Deibel (1915–1951), Dutch pilot of the Royal Netherlands East Indies Army Air Force
- Ed Deibel, founder of the Canadian Northern Ontario Party

== See also ==
- Teufel
