= Thibaut Detal =

Belgian footballer

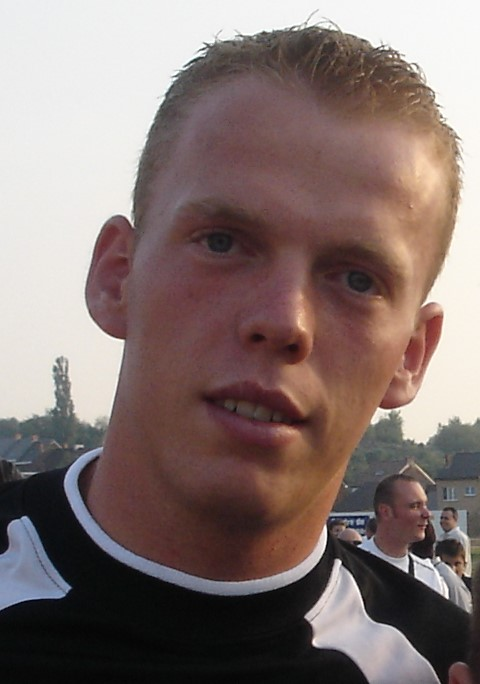
Thibaut Detal - Sporting Charleroi

Thibaut Detal (born 1 January 1985, in Beauraing) is a Belgian football player who currently plays for RUS Assesse.

== Career ==
The central midfielder recently played for R. Charleroi S.C. and for C.S. Visé in the Belgian Third Division.
