= Deubel =

Deubel is a German surname. Its main origin is a nickname literally meaning "devil" for a ruthless person. Notable people with the surname include:

- Heinrich Deubel (1890–1962), German soldier, civil servant and officer in the Schutzstaffel who served as commandant of Dachau
- Léon Deubel (1879–1913), French poet
- Max Deubel (born 1935), German sidecar racer
- Paula Deubel (1935–1993), American athlete

== See also ==
- Deibel
- Teufel
