= Regionalism in Somogy County =

Regionalism in Somogy County is a political phenomenon that focuses on the normative interests of Somogy County and its citizens in Hungarian politics. This can be derived from the former independent Duchy of Somogy and the administrative division maintained by the older County system (1000–1049) of the Hungarian Kingdom and later by the current county system in force since 1949. Association for Somogy is currently the only regionalist party of Somogy County.

== Ideology ==
Somogy County economically, culturally, linguistically or religiously does not form a distinct area in Hungary since its industry is an organic part of the Hungarian economy and its population is Hungarian and Christian in majority. The regionalist intentions are for the creation of an attractive and sustaining force for capital and labor, furthermore for the economic development of the county. However they demand more sovereignty, there is no claim to separatism.

According to the Association for Somogy political party there are some leading objectives of regionalist politics in Somogy which includes the improvement of infrastructure, health, education, public security and the support of those who creates employment opportunities. Helping the young in starting their lives and the elderly in their livelihood, as well as catching up the disadvantaged are also significant goals. One of their main aim is establishing an autonomous Balaton Region at Lake Balaton.

== History ==
The Duchy of Somogy as an autonomous area between the River Drava and Lake Balaton was created in the 10th century. The first known ruler of the principality was Fajsz who had his residence in Somogyvár. He was followed by Zerind the Bald, then by Koppány who in the Battle of Veszprém was defeated by Stephen I of Hungary. Consequently, Somogy became part of the newly formed county system as Somogy County.

== Regionlist political parties of Somogy ==
- Somogy County Christian Coalition (Hungarian: Somogyi Keresztény Koalíció, 1990)
- Association for Somogy (Hungarian: Somogyért Egyesület, since 1994)

== Literature ==
- István Marton - A Balaton régió fejlődése - A regionális gondolkodás és a turizmus fejlődésének összefüggései a Balaton térségében
- Gyula Kristó - Szent István király (2001, Vince kiadó)
- Tamás Guzsik - Szólád a középkorban
- Teodóra Maurer and Gyula Onody - Koppány, Somogy hercege
- Dr Ede Reiszig - SOMOGY VÁRMEGYE TÖRTÉNETE
