= Teufel (surname) =

Teufel or Teuffel is a German-language surname orignating from a nickname ("devil" in German) for a ruthless person. Notable people with the surname include:

- Erwin Teufel (born 1939), German politician
- Fritz Teufel (1943–2010), German left-wing activist
- Hugo Teufel III (born 1961), American lawyer and government official
- Reinhard Teufel (born 1979), Austrian politician
- Stefan Teufel (born 1972), German politician
- Tim Teufel (born 1958), American baseball player and coach
- Wilhelm Siegmund Teuffel (1820–1878), German classical scholar

== See also ==
- Peter Toyfl (1941–2025), Austrian speed skater
- Deibel
- Deubel
