= Clarence Diebold =

American football player (1881–1944)

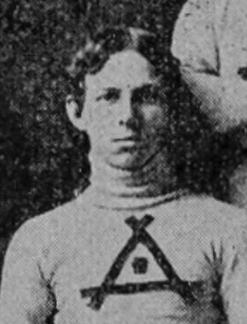
- Diebold with the Pittsburgh AC ice hockey team

Notre Dame Fighting Irish
- Position: Quarterback

Personal information
- Born: August 1, 1881
- Died: January 7, 1944 (aged 62)

Career information
- College: Notre Dame (1900)

Clarence Joseph Diebold (August 1, 1881 – January 7, 1944) was an American football player from Pittsburgh, Pennsylvania and a starting quarterback for the University of Notre Dame.

Diebold earned the starting quarterback job at the beginning of the 20th century under new head coach Pat O'Dea. His team began the season in magnificent fashion, outscoring their first four opponents by a combined total of 245–0. However, the run skidded to a halt with a 6–0 loss at Indiana, followed by a 6–6 tie against Beloit and a demoralizing 54–0 loss at Wisconsin—the worst-ever loss for the Irish at that time. But the team showed spirit in a competitive 7–0 loss at Michigan, then closed out the year with two straight wins for a final record of 6–3–1.

Prior to his time at Notre Dame, Diebold played cover point for the 1899–1900 Pittsburgh Athletic Club ice hockey team that won the championship of the Western Pennsylvania Hockey League.

After graduation, Diebold returned to his hometown of Pittsburgh where he married Edna Louise Lally and worked in the family lumber business. At the time of his death, he was vice president of the Diebold Investment Company.
