= Rad (journal) =

- Discipline: Multidisciplinary academic
- Language: Croatian

Publication details
- History: 1867–present
- Publisher: Yugoslav, now Croatian, Academy of Sciences and Arts (Croatia)

Standard abbreviations
- ISO 4: Rad

Indexing
- ISSN: 1330-0490

Rad (Croatian for proceedings, work) is an academic journal published by the Yugoslav, now Croatian, Academy of Sciences and Arts. It was their only publication from 1867 until 1882, when each of the individual scientific sections of the academy started printing their own journals. As of 2014, over five hundred issues have been published.
