= Tibold =

10th-century Hungarian clan name

Genus (gens) Tibold
- Country: Principality of Hungary; Kingdom of Hungary; Kingdom of Croatia
- Founded: c. 997
- Founder: Theobald
- Dissolution: 14th century
- Cadet branches: House of Babócsai; House of Szencsei

Tibold (Tybold or Tibolch) was a gens (Latin for "clan"; nemzetség in Hungarian) in the Kingdom of Hungary, and later in the Kingdom of Croatia. The namesake founder of the kindred, Theobald, arrived from the Kingdom of Germany in the late 10th century, during the reign of Géza, Grand Prince of the Hungarians. The clan held lands in Somogy and Križevci counties, along the river Drava.

The Slavonian Szencsei (Svetački; de Zempche) family descended from this clan.

== Origin ==
The kindred that is called the kindred of Babócsa came into Pannonia from Samberg.

— Illuminated Chronicle

So at that time Count Tibold of Fanberg came to Duke Géza. He was called Graf Tibold, and some members of the same family are still simply called Graf to this day. The Babócsa derive their origins from him, these persons being von Deutschland.

— Simon of Kéza: Gesta Hunnorum et Hungarorum

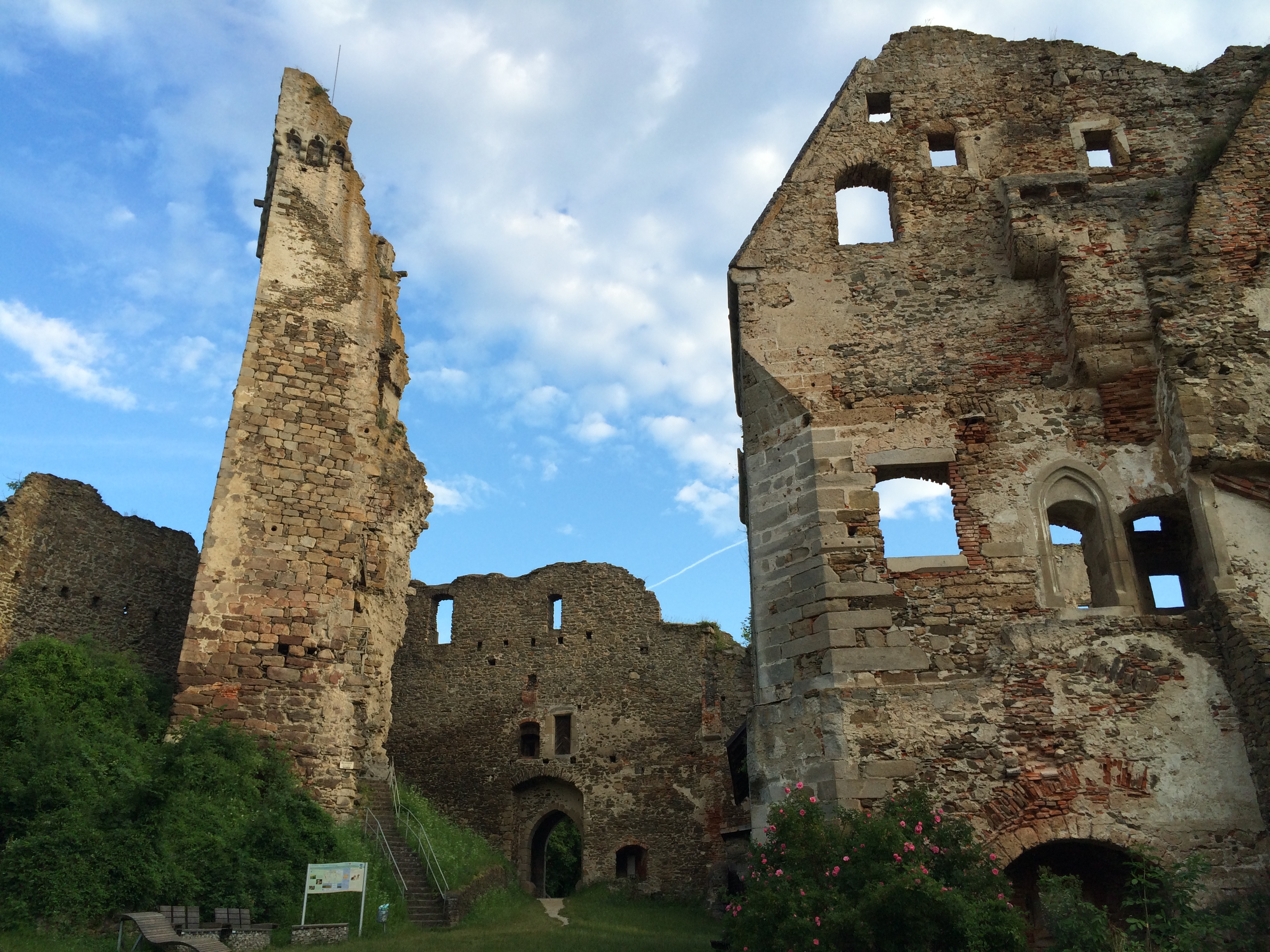
The ruins of Schaunberg Castle, the most likely place of origin for the Tibolds

The Tibold genus was among the so-called advena ("newcomer") clans of foreign origin in the Kingdom of Hungary. The mid-13th century historian Master Ákos remembers the origin of the kindred in a single sentence. The chronicler calls the kinship after their primary residence Babócsa and writes that they came from "Samberg" to Hungary. Ákos' text was preserved by the 14th-century chronicle composition, including the Illuminated Chronicle. The brevity of the chronicle indicates that the members of the family were not prominent figures in national politics in the middle of the 13th century. Another chronicler Simon of Kéza, who compiled his work Gesta Hunnorum et Hungarorum in the early 1280s, provides more and slightly different details about the origin of the kindred. Accordingly, the ancestor of the kindred was a certain "Count Theobald of Fanberg", who was invited to Hungary by Géza, Grand Prince of the Hungarians in the late 10th century. The chronicler emphasizes that Theobald and his family originated from "Vandeuchumlant" ("von Deutschland"), i.e. from Germany, describing the country of origin in German. Simon also refers to Theobald with the epithet "Grauu" which then became an alternative surname of the family by the 13th century. Historian János Karácsonyi assumed its meaning "grey". In contrast, Mór Wertner argued this epithet came from his title of count ("Graf"). This was accepted by other historians, e.g. Elemér Mélyusz.

Historians have made several attempts to identify the place of origin ("Samberg" or "Fanberg"). Mór Wertner connected Theobald to the House of Schaumburg. He considered that Theobald was among those Bavarian lords and knights, who arrived to Hungary in the accompaniment of Queen Gisela of Bavaria, the spouse of the future Hungarian king Stephen around 996. Elemér Mályusz rejected the identification with the Schamburg dynasty. Instead, he identified the place of origin with the castle of Schaunberg along the river Danube near Eferding in present-day Hartkirchen, Upper Austria. Erik Fügedi considered that Theobald was a "count from Thuringia".

According to Bálint Hóman, Theobald participated in the civil war between Stephen and Koppány for the Hungarian throne in 997 and 998, alongside other members of the German entourage of Gisela. Following the defeat of Koppány, his territory the Duchy of Somogy was disintegrated. For his military service during the struggle, Theobald was granted landholdings in the southern part of the emerging Somogy County, along the river Drava, by Stephen I. The settlement Babócsa became the centre of his estates in the region. Archaeologist Kálmán Magyar considered that Theobald possessed sporadic lands also in the interior areas of the county, and the town Tab is named after him, where he plausibly built a fortified manor.

== Early history ==
Several historians – for instance, Bálint Hóman, Elemér Mályusz and György Györffy – argued that certain Tietpaldus comes, who appears in the account of Berthold of Reichenau as an influential courtier of King Andrew I of Hungary in 1060, belonged to the Tibold clan and he was a son or grandson of its namesake founder. Györffy even claimed that this Theobald was the founder of the arriving kindred. This Theobald mediated in the forging of alliance between Andrew I and the court of Henry IV of Germany. When Duke Béla, the younger brother of the ailing Andrew rebelled against him in 1060, Andrew I entrusted Theobald to deliver the royal family – Queen Anastasia and young princes Solomon and David – to Melk Abbey under the protection of Ernest, Margrave of Austria. Finally, Béla dethroned Andrew by force in 1060.

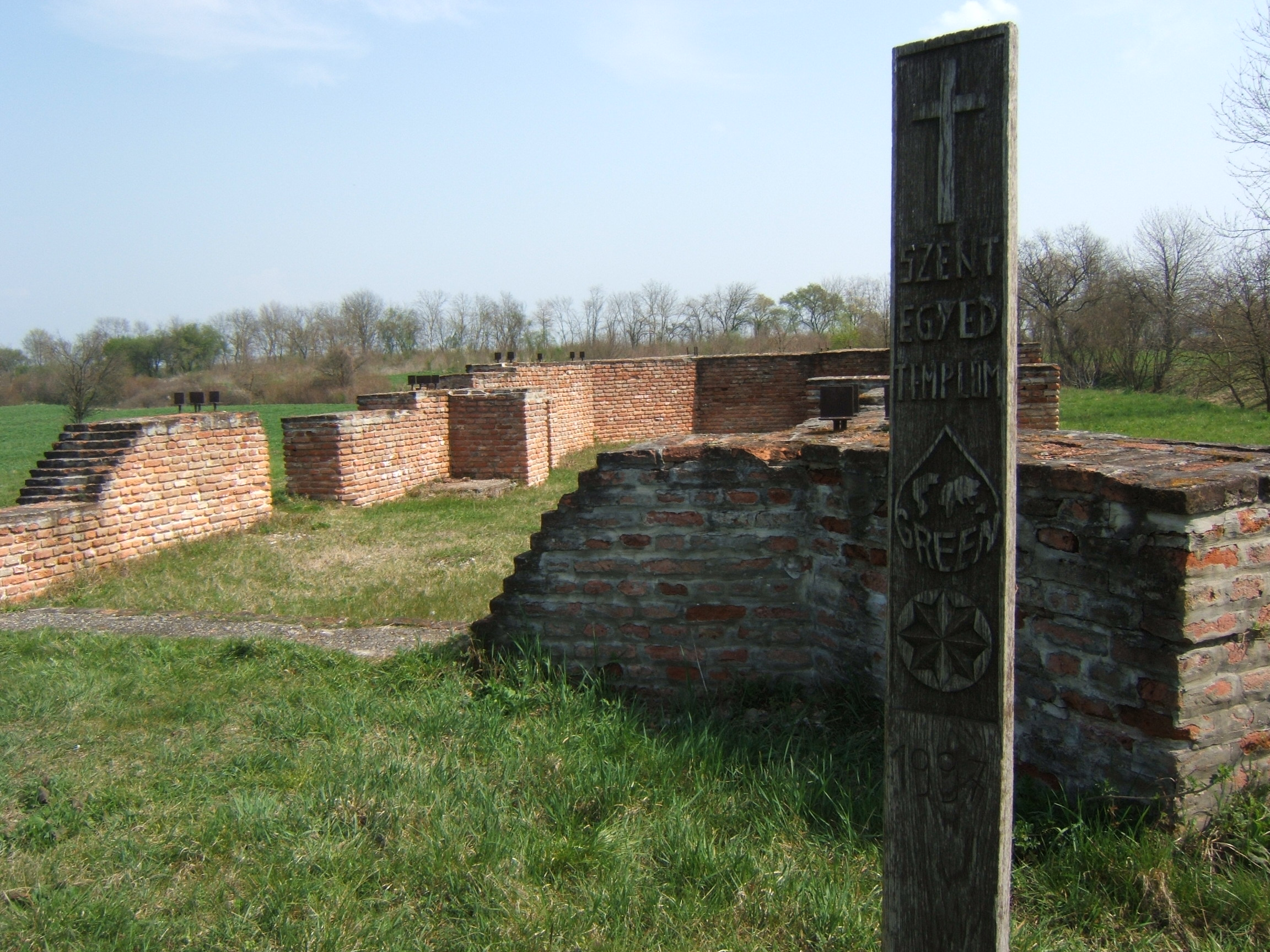
The ruins of the monastery in Babócsa in Hungary, erected by the Tibolds

Two members of the kindred – Grab and Theobald (possibly father and son) – served as ispáns of Somogy County at the turn of the 11th and 12th centuries (c. 1090 and 1111–1113, respectively). Wertner considered that Grab's name derived from the title "Graf", in accordance with Simon of Kéza's narration. Grab was a courtier of Ladislaus I of Hungary. He was present when Ladislaus I founded the Bishopric of Zagreb sometime between 1087 and 1090, in areas adjacent to Somogy County. His possible son Theobald escorted King Coloman to Dalmatia in 1111. According to Croatian historian Vjekoslav Klaić, Theobald held the office of ban of Slavonia sometime during his career, because later members of the kindred identified themselves "de genere Tybold bani", while János Karácsonyi claimed that one of the 13th-century members called Theobald functioned in this capacity.

Around 1093 or 1094, Grab founded a Benedictine monastery in Garáb in Syrmia County (present-day Grabovo, Serbia), dedicated to Margaret the Virgin. Consequently, the settlement was named after him thereafter. Presumably in the 12th century, members of the Tibold kindred erected another Benedictine monastery in Béla (today Bijela, Croatia), dedicated to Margaret too. Their third monastery was founded in Babócsa, dedicated to Saint Nicholas, in the first decades of the 13th century. The latter became the central monastery of the entire clan, serving as its burial place. The three monasteries were repeatedly brought under unified management based on the surviving sources.

== In sources ==
=== Partition of estates ===
Throughout the 12th century, the Tibolds acquired lands beyond the left bank of river Drava in the territory of Slavonia. Simultaneously, Križevci County was established from detached territories of Somogy County. They expanded their wealth into the valleys of streams Stupčanica, Tapolca and Peker until the river Sava. There, along the stream Subocka, the future lordship of Szencse (present-day Novska, Croatia) was formed. The Tibolds became the wealthiest kindred of the region, alongside the Téténys.

Aside from the early 11th-century ispáns, the first known member of the clan was Budur or Bodor (I), who lived at the turn of the 12–13th centuries. He had six sons, James (I), Cosmas, Petke, Thomas, Budur (II) and Theobald (I). They decided to divide their extensive estates and landholdings in 1231, the earliest surviving such contract within a family from the Kingdom of Hungary. The eldest brothers – James, Cosmas and Petke – were granted the ancient seat Babócsa, in addition to Tarnóca (today a borough of Barcs), Szedereg, Komlósd, Péterhida, Décse, Domján, Vajon, Rozmen, Ruszen, Bolhó, Nagykaszó and Kiskaszó in Somogy County. They also acquired the lordship along the river Toplica near present-day Daruvar in Križevci County in Slavonia, together with the villages Bük, Csaba, István and Doboka along Drava. The younger sons – Thomas, Budur and Theobald – received the lordship of Lábod, which consisted of fourteen settlements in the southern part of Somogy County. In addition, the also became owners of the lordship of Szencse in the Sava region.

=== Spreading to Slavonia ===
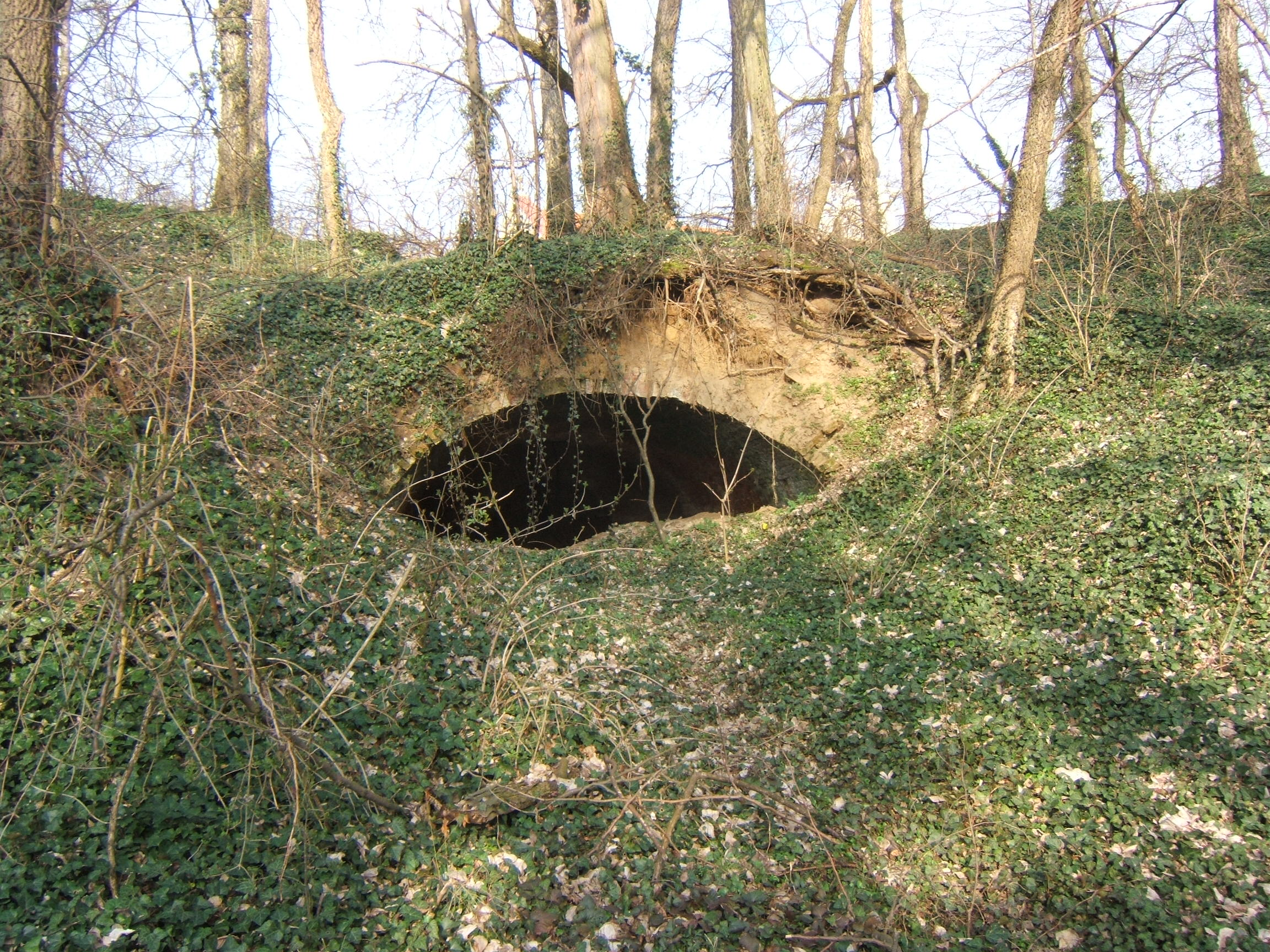
The ruins of the castle of Babócsa in Hungary

The Tibolds were prominent landowners in the region throughout the 13th century, but they did not manage to reach a national role in the royal court. Prior to the Mongol invasion of Hungary, they erected a 30x35 m motte-and-bailey castle on the bank of Rinya in their main estate Babócsa. According to archaeologist Kálmán Magyar, it was still used during the Ottoman period. The Tibolds also constructed a fortified manor in the settlement, near to their monastery. James and Petke were referred to as patrons of Garáb Abbey in 1234, when sold the estate Szélborona (Zelbarouna), which was situated on the southwestern slopes of the Papuk mountain, to Ivánka Zsadány. The abbot complained that Ivánka seized the estate by force, but Ugrin Csák, Archbishop of Kalocsa validated the sale after the brothers' testimony. After Béla IV ascended the Hungarian throne in 1235, James was involved in that investigation committee led by Bartholomew, Bishop of Veszprém in 1236–1237, which supervised and sometimes overruled previous land grants occurred in Somogy County, among others. In this capacity, he took part in the judgment over the estate Borhod between a certain George, son of Maurus and the royal crown (Somogy Castle). Among the six brothers, only Theobald is mentioned hereinafter, he was still alive in 1269, when still possessed Lábod.

James (I) had two sons and a daughter. Shortly after the Mongol invasion in 1241, James (II) and Theobald (II) donated an estate in Križevci County between the rivers Stupčanica (Szaplonca) and Kretin, near present-day Brestovac, Croatia to their brother-in-law Izsó Gyenesi. The elderly James (II) confirmed this act together with his adult sons John (II), Leustach and Ladislaus before the collegiate chapter of Čazma in 1302.

Among the sons of Cosmas, Alexander (mentioned only once in 1269) married a daughter of comes Pribislaus Kamarcai. His another two sons Zerje and Demetrius (II) entered into a property division agreement with the three sons of Theobald (I) – Nicholas (I), John (I) and Denis – in 1294, regarding those estates which the clan acquired after the aforementioned first such act in 1231. Accordingly, Zerje and Demetrius (II) were granted Som and Kapurév (today a borough of Szabadhídvég) with its river port in the northeastern part of Somogy County, while Nicholas (I), John (I) and Denis received Lesnek (Sloboština, present-day a borough of Brestovac), Cirkvena and Koseth, the villages surrounding the Szencse lordship in Križevci County, which further deepened the separation of the Hungarian and Slavonian branches from each other. Nevertheless, Zerje possessed the castle of Stupčanica (Szaplonca, today in Veliki Bastaji) in Slavonia. During the era of interregnum in the early 14th century, Zerje and his cousin John (I) concluded a defense alliance with each other in 1307. Both of them belonged to the partisans of Charles I of Hungary, who confirmed their treaty in 1313.

János Karácsonyi considered Mihalc was the son of Petke (a diminutive form of Peter), because of the frequent use of the name Peter in his branch. Nevertheless, Vjekoslav Klaić presented a document which implies that Grab and Demetrius (I) were the sons of Petke. Tamás Pálosfalvi argued that Petke was given no portion in Szencse lordship during the division of estates in 1231, while Mihalc's descendants were landowners there. After Zerje died without male descendants, Paul (I) and his brothers Nicholas (II) and Peter (I) acquired Stupčanica Castle in 1314. Initially, Paul was a supporter of Charles, like his cousins. He served as župan (or ispán) of Gerzence County in Slavonia in 1326–1327, plausibly appointed by Ban Mikcs Ákos. In the next year, in March 1328, he was referred to as ispán of Szana County, also in the service of the ban. Together with his brother Nicholas, Paul took part in the siege of Sjenićak (Sztenicsnyák) in the autumn of 1327, when Mikcs captured the castle from the rebellious Babonić family. Prior to 1332, Paul turned against Charles for unknown reasons and barricaded himself into the fort of Stupčanica, where from he constantly plundered the region and committed "innumerable sorts of evil" to the detriment of the king's supporters, until his capture and ultimate death in prison in 1330 or 1331. Paul had no descendants, thus his estates, including Stupčanica Castle, were inherited by his brother Nicholas (II). He swore loyalty to Charles and handed over the fort to the king, and was accordingly pardoned together with his son John (V) and his nephews, Nicholas (III), Peter (II), Paul (II) and Demetrius (III), sons of the late Peter (I). They were able to retain their possessions, and Nicholas (II) was granted some additional portions. A lesser branch of the Szencsei (Svetački) family descended from the Mihalc branch, but they remained insignificant local nobles in comparison to Theobald's branch (see below) and their genealogy is highly uncertain due to lack of sources.

The fourth son Thomas married Enud, daughter of the late Theodore. They had no known descendants. Thomas died before 1250. The dowry of Enud was paid by family members Budur (II) and his nephews Grab and Demetrius (I) in 1250.

In 1297, Julad, the only known son of Budur (II) donated his estate in Németiszeg (detaching it from the lordship of Lábod) to his nephew Herbord Hahót, who was the son of Lancelot Hahót and Julad's unidentified sister. Herbord was the progenitor of the Söjtöri family. According to János Karácsonyi, the Somogy branch of the Tibold kindred became extinct by the early 14th century, leaving the Szencseis of Slavonia as the only surviving cadet branch behind, and thus the Tibolds lost all of their possessions north of Drava, including the ancient estate Babócsa, within decades. In contrast, Mór Wertner emphasized that Julad had a son Arnold. Sometime, they jointly pledged their land Heresznye (near Babócsa) for their debt of 40 marks to Atyusz Hahót (Herbord's cousin). Arnold had a son Michael, whose two sons Stephen and George appear in a source in 1349, when hey pledged their portion in Németiszeg to their relative Lawrence Söjtöri and his son James. Nicholas was the son of George. In 1368, he was indebted to the sons of Thomas Aradi (Lawrence, Bartholomew, the custos of Čazma, and Thomas), which, if he does not pay, he is responsible for it with his estates. He refused to pay his debt, as a result he was forced to pledge his portion in Hosszúfalu (a borough of Lábod) to the Aradis in 1369. The last known member of the Babócsai family was Ladislaus, the son of Nicholas. He died without descendants in 1398, as a result the castle of Babócsa escheat to the crown. King Sigismund donated the fort to Nicholas Marcali and his brothers.

The illustrious Szencsei family descended from John (I), the son of Theobald (I). John's three sons, Leukus, John (IV) and Kakas were adherent and loyal soldiers of Charles I during his struggle against the oligarchs. They received tax exemptions for their services in 1322, including exemptions from paying marturina and collecta (extraordinary tax of 7 denari). Leukus and Kakas divided the lordship of Szencse among themselves in 1343. They possessed too the castle of Fejérkő (today Bijela Stijena, Croatia) by that time. Leukus served as castellan of the royal castle of Lipovec in 1349. Leukus and Kakas were progenitors of the Szencsei (Svetački) family, an illustrious kinship in the history of Slavonia up to the Ottoman–Habsburg wars. Their cousin John (III) took a different path; he was imprisoned by the king for unknown reasons and was obliged to pledge some of his lands in Somogy County to pay his ransom in 1326.

== Family tree ==
It is only from the beginning of the 13th century that it is possible to outline kinship relationships.

- Budur I
  - James I (fl. 1231–1237)
    - Theobald II (fl. 1241)
    - James II (fl. 1241–1302)
      - John II (fl. 1302)
      - Leustach (fl. 1302)
      - Ladislaus (fl. 1302)
    - a daughter (fl. 1241) ∞ Izsó Gyenesi
  - Cosmas (fl. 1231)
    - Alexander (fl. 1269) ∞ daughter of comes Pribislaus Kamarcai
    - Zerje (fl. 1294–1307, d. before 1314)
    - Demetrius II (fl. 1294)
  - Petke (fl. 1231–1234)
    - Grab (fl. 1250)
    - Demetrius I (fl. 1250)
    - (?) Mihalc
      - Peter I (fl. 1314; d. before 1332)
        - Nicholas III (fl. 1332–1351)
          - Paul Szencsei (fl. 1376–1402), vice-ban of Croatia and Dalmatia
        - Peter II (fl. 1332–1351)
        - Paul II (fl. 1332–1351)
        - Demetrius III (fl. 1332–1351)
      - Paul I (fl. 1314–1332†)
      - Nicholas II (fl. 1314–1351)
        - John V (fl. 1332)
  - Thomas (fl. 1231, d. before 1250) ∞ Enud, daughter of Theodore
  - Budur II (fl. 1231–1250)
    - Julad (fl. 1297) --> Babócsai family (extinct 1398)
    - a daughter ∞ Lancelot Hahót
  - Theobald I (fl. 1231–1269)
    - Nicholas I (fl. 1294)
      - John III (fl. 1314–1343)
    - John I (fl. 1294–1314) --> Szencsei (Svetački) family
    - Denis (fl. 1294)

== Sources ==
=== Primary sources ===
- Simon of Kéza: The Deeds of the Hungarians (Edited and translated by László Veszprémy and Frank Schaer with a study by Jenő Szűcs) (1999). CEU Press. ISBN 963-9116-31-9.
- The Hungarian Illuminated Chronicle: Chronica de Gestis Hungarorum (Edited by Dezső Dercsényi) (1970). Corvina, Taplinger Publishing. ISBN 0-8008-4015-1.

=== Secondary sources ===
- Engel, Pál (1996). Magyarország világi archontológiája, 1301–1457, I. [Secular Archontology of Hungary, 1301–1457, Volume I] (in Hungarian). História, MTA Történettudományi Intézete. ISBN 963-8312-44-0.
- F. Romhányi, Beatrix (2000). Kolostorok és társaskáptalanok a középkori Magyarországon: Katalógus [Monasteries and Collegiate Chapters in Medieval Hungary: A Catalogue] (in Hungarian). Pytheas. ISBN 963-7483-07-1.
- Fügedi, Erik (1986). Ispánok, bárók, kiskirályok [Ispáns, Barons and Petty Kings]. Magvető. ISBN 963-14-0582-6.
- Györffy, György (2013). István király és műve [King Stephen and his work] (in Hungarian). Balassi Kiadó. ISBN 978-963-506-896-8.
- Karácsonyi, János (1900). A magyar nemzetségek a XIV. század közepéig. [The Hungarian genera until the middle of the 14th century] (in Hungarian). Hungarian Academy of Sciences.
- Klaić, Vjekoslav (1913). Plemići Svetački ili nobiles de Zempche (997–1719) [The Nobles of Svetački or nobiles de Zempche (997–1719] (in Croatian). Rad Jugoslavenske Akademije Znanosti i Umjetnosti 199.
- Magyar, Kálmán (2001). "Szent István király államszervezésének somogyi emlékeiről [The Memories of the State Organization of King Saint Stephen in Somogy County]". In Bertalan, Béla (ed.). Tabi Kilátó 2000–2001 (in Hungarian). Tab Város Polgármesteri Hivatal. pp. 27–48. ISSN 0237-580X.
- Mályusz, Elemér (1971). Az V. István-kori geszta [The Gesta of the Age of Stephen V]. Akadémiai Kiadó.
- Pálosfalvi, Tamás (2014). The Noble Elite in the County of Körös (Križevci), 1400–1526 (in Hungarian). MTA Bölcsészettudományi Kutatóközpont. ISBN 978-963-962-7840.
- Pauler, Gyula (1899). A magyar nemzet története az Árpád-házi királyok alatt, I. [The History of the Hungarian Nation during the Árpádian Kings, Vol. 1.] (in Hungarian). Athenaeum.
- Wertner, Mór (1903). "Megjegyzések a «Magyar nemzetségek a XIV. század közepéig» czimü munkára. (Ötödik, befejező közlemény.) [Comments on the Work titled «The Hungarian genera until the middle of the 14th century». (Fifth, Concluding Statement.)]". Turul (in Hungarian). 21 (4): 171–177. ISSN 1216-7258.
- Zsoldos, Attila (2011). Magyarország világi archontológiája, 1000–1301 [Secular Archontology of Hungary, 1000–1301] (in Hungarian). História, MTA Történettudományi Intézete. ISBN 978-963-9627-38-3.
