= Jürgen Theobaldy =

German poet and writer (born 1944)

- Born: 7 March 1944 (age 82); Strasbourg, France
- Occupation: Author

Jürgen Theobaldy (born 7 March 1944) is a German poet and writer who lives in Bern, Switzerland.

== Early life and education ==
Jürgen Theobaldy was born in Strasbourg (then under German occupation) and grew up in Mannheim in a working class family. During World War II, Mannheim was heavily bombed, but it was rebuilt quickly after the war.

After completing a commercial apprenticeship, Theobaldy studied at the Universities of Education at Freiburg im Breisgau and Heidelberg, hoping perhaps, at least initially, to become a primary or secondary school teacher. He then studied literature at Universities of Heidelberg and Cologne and, from 1974, at the Free University of Berlin. He has lived in Switzerland since 1984.

== Career ==
His literary career began in the student movement in the late 1960s when he wrote "Die Freiheit für Bobby Seale" ("Freedom for Bobby Seale"), a poem about an anti-war demonstration which gained significant attention.

In the late 1960s or early 1970s, Theobaldy became interested in the poetry of the Beat movement and Britain's "angry young men". Theobaldy translated poems by Jim Burns, as well as Latin American poets like Roque Dalton and Ernesto Cardenal. From 1971 to 1973, he edited the poetry journal Benzin.

During the early 1970s, Theobaldy belonged to a circle of poets in Cologne that included Rolf Dieter Brinkmann, Ralf-Rainer Rygulla, and Rolf Eckart John. His poetry from this period shifted towards an "anti-ideological" focus on everyday reality, similar to the approach of Nicolas Born and Michael Buselmeier.

In 1974, Theobaldy and Rolf Dieter Brinkmann were both living in the London home of the author John James. Through James, they got acquainted with poets Peter Riley and Andrew Crozier. In 1975, Theobaldy accompanied Brinkmann on the trip to London where Brinkmann dies in a traffict accident, and was present at his death. By the mid-to-late 1970s, Theobaldy became known as a key figure of the Neue Subjektivität ("New Subjectivity") movement in late 20th-century German poetry.

There was a poetological and political division between German Beat poets like Hadayatullah Hübsch, Jörg Fauser and Jürgen Ploog, and poets like Theobaldy and Born. Confronted with the views of left-wing literary critics, Theobaldy maintained that his approach of embracing a "new" subjectivity was not political.

Later, Theobaldy began to experiment with stricter, more traditional forms. However, his more recent poetry collection Wilde Nelken (2005) and Hin und wieder hin: Gedichte aus Japan (2015) returns to the free, subjective style and air of his poetry of the 1970s.

In addition to poetry, Theobaldy has published several novels and volumes with stories, most of which reflect his experiences in places like Heidelberg, Berlin, and Bern.

In 2010, his archives, including a dossier on Brinkmann, was obtained by the Swiss Literary Archives.

== Critical Perspectives ==
Michael Kämper-van den Boogart describes novels and prose of Theobaldy, as well as those of his colleagues Botho Strauss and Uwe Timm, as seeing an "aesthetic" that mirrors the experience of human failures and defeats, as accomplished in their socially critical works.

Gregory Divers notes that the style of Theobaldy's early 1960s works reveals the author's indebtedness to contemporary, often provocative American and British poetry.

== Works ==
=== Poetry collections ===
- Sperrsitz (1973)
- Blaue Flecken (1974)
- Zweiter Klasse (1976)
- Drinks (1979)
- Schwere Erde, Rauch (1980)
- Die Sommertour (1983)
- Midlands, Drinks (1984)
- In den Aufwind (1990)
- Der Nachtbildsammler (1992)
- Mehrstimmiges Grün (1994; with proses)
- Immer wieder alles (2000)
- Wilde Nelken (2005)
- 24 Stunden offen (2006)
- Suchen ist schwer (2012)
- Hin und wieder hin. Gedichte aus Japan (2015)
- Auf dem unberührten Tisch (2019)
- Einfach um die Sonne (2021)
- Poesiealbum 368 (2022; illustrated by Johannes Vennekamp)
- Guten Tag in Kyōto. Zwei Reisen in Tanka (2022)

=== Novels and story collections ===
- Sonntags Kino (1978)
- Spanische Wände (1981)
- Das Festival im Hof (1985)
- Ein Glücksfall (1996; illustrated by Thomas Weber)
- In der Ferne zitternde Häuser (2000)
- Trilogie der nächsten Ziele (2003)
- Aus nächster Nähe (2013)
- Rückvergütung (2015)
- Geschichten im Vorübergehen (2020)
- Bis es passt. Zehn Erzählungen (2023)
- Mein Schützling (2023)

=== Critical work ===
- Veränderung der Lyrik (1976; with Gustav Zürcher)

=== As an editor ===
- Benzin (1971–1973)
- Und ich bewege mich doch (1977)

=== Translations into German ===
- Aras Ören: Der kurze Traum aus Kagithane (1974; adaptation of a translation by H. Achmed Schmiede)
- Jim Burns: Leben in Preston (1973; with Rolf Eckart John)
- Jim Burns: Fred Engels bei Woolworth (1977; with Rolf Eckart John)
- Lu Xun: Kein Ort zum Schreiben (1983; with Egbert Baqué)
- Liu Zongyuan: Am törichten Bach (2005; with Raffael Keller)
