= Tybalt =

Character in Romeo and Juliet

- Romeo and Juliet character
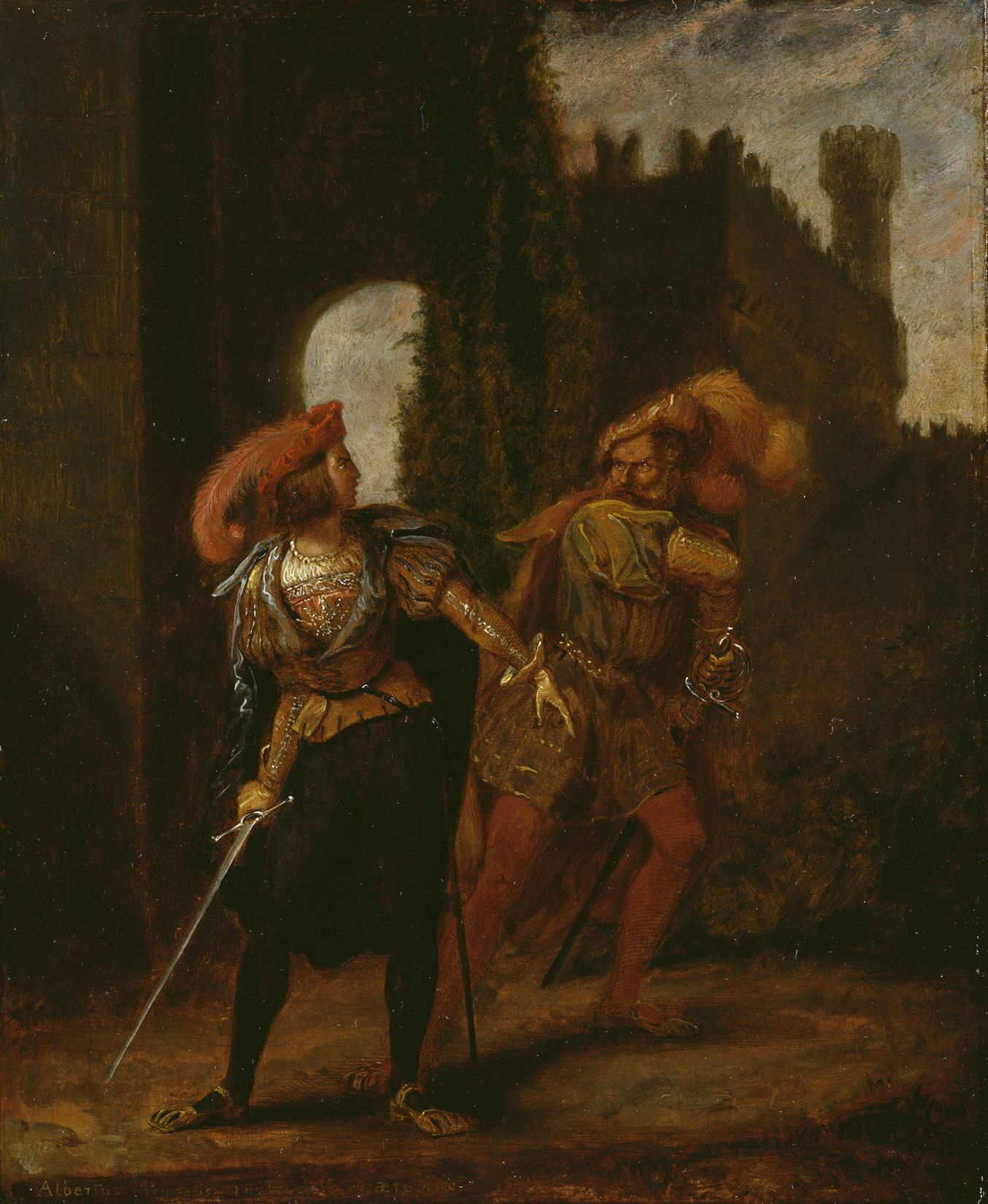
- Romeo and Tybalt (painted by Albert, Prince Consort c. 1840–1845)
- Created by: William Shakespeare

In-universe information
- Family: Lady Capulet (paternal aunt); Juliet Capulet (cousin)

Tybalt (/ˈtɪbəlt/ TIB-əlt; Italian: Tebaldo) is a fictional character and the principal antagonist in William Shakespeare's play Romeo and Juliet. The son of Lady Capulet's brother, he is Juliet's short-tempered first cousin, and Romeo's rival. Tybalt shares the same name as the character Tibert / Tybalt "the prince of cats" in the popular story Reynard the Fox, a point of mockery in the play. Mercutio repeatedly calls Tybalt "prince of cats", (Note: Italian: principe dei gatti; the nickname could perhaps refer not only to the Reynard character but to the Italian profanity cazzo ('prick, dick'), which could then form a minced oath on principe del cazzo (fucking prince).) in reference to his sleek, yet violent manner.

Luigi da Porto adapted the story as Giulietta e Romeo and included it in his Historia novellamente ritrovata di due Nobili Amanti (Newly found tale of two Noble lovers) published in 1530. Da Porto drew on Pyramus and Thisbe, Giovanni Boccaccio's Decameron and a novella by Masuccio Salernitano. Da Porto gave it much of its modern form, including the lovers' names, the rival families of Montecchi and Capuleti, and their location in Verona. He also introduces characters corresponding to Shakespeare's Mercutio, Tybalt, and Paris. Da Porto presents his tale as historically true and claims it took place in the days of Bartolomeo II della Scala (a century earlier than Salernitano). Montague and Capulet were actual 13th century political factions, but the only known connection between them is a mention in Dante's Purgatorio as an example of civil dissension.

== Part in the play ==
In Act I, Scene I, Tybalt enters and helps his own servants, Sampson and Gregory, who are fighting in the streets with servants of the Montagues, Abraham and Balthasar. Seeing Benvolio (Romeo's cousin) trying to stop the fight, Tybalt draws his sword to fight Benvolio, saying:

What, drawn and talk of peace? I hate the word
As I hate hell, all Montagues, and thee.
Have at thee, coward!
—Act I, Scene I

Later, at the Capulets' ball, Tybalt is the first to recognize Romeo through his disguise, and would kill him if not forbidden by his uncle, Lord Capulet. His lust for revenge unsated, Tybalt sends a challenge letter to Romeo for a duel to the death. At the beginning of Act III, he enters looking for Romeo, only to create tensions with Mercutio, who was mocking Tybalt even before he walked into the scene. Tybalt initially ignores Mercutio and confronts Romeo, who refuses to fight because of his recent secret marriage to Juliet. Tybalt becomes even angrier; he does not know Romeo cannot fight him because they are now relatives.

Mercutio loses his temper and begins fighting Tybalt himself. Romeo tries to stop the combat by rushing between them, and Tybalt then stabs Mercutio under his arm. Mercutio dies from the wound, angering an already emotional Romeo. Enraged, Romeo duels and kills Tybalt in return, leading to his own exile by Prince Escalus.

Tybalt is revealed to be Juliet's maternal first cousin, when Lady Capulet arrives at the scene where Tybalt lies dead, and cries

"Tybalt, my cousin, O my brother's child!"
—Act III

== Performance history ==
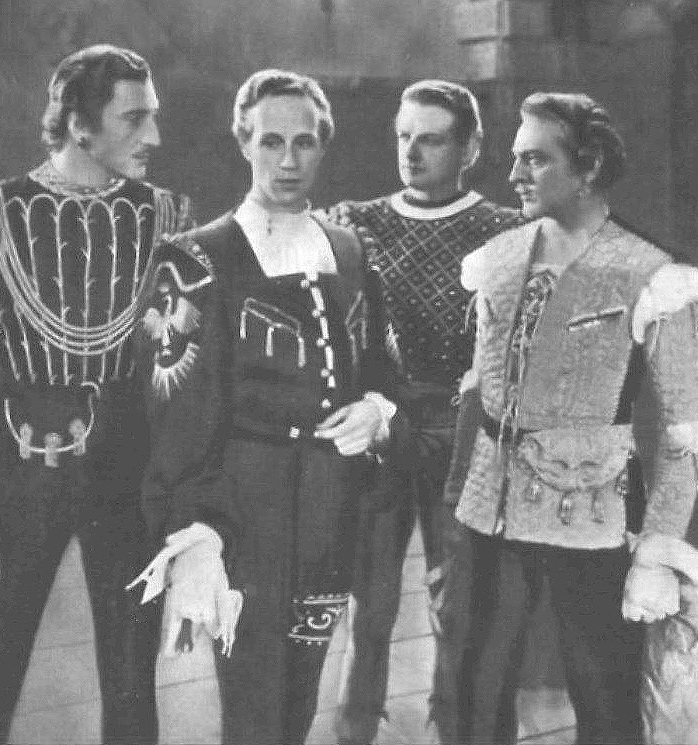
Basil Rathbone (left) as Tybalt in the 1936 film.

A sample of notable portrayals include:

- Louis Hector in Frank Reicher's 1923 Broadway show, which ran for 157 performances
- Orson Welles in Katharine Cornell's 1934 production; his Broadway debut
- Basil Rathbone in George Cukor's 1936 film version; nominated for Best Supporting Actor
- Cornel Wilde in Laurence Olivier's 1940 Broadway production
- William Smithers in Peter Glenville's 1951 Broadway revival
- Enzo Fiermonte in the 1954 film rendition
- Richard Wordsworth in The Old Vic Company's 1956 Broadway production
- George Chakiris as Bernardo Nuñez in West Side Story (1961) musical; won Best Supporting Actor Oscar
- Michael York in Franco Zeffirelli's 1968 film adaptation
- Armand Assante in Theodore Mann's 1977 Broadway revival
- Alan Rickman in the 1978 BBC Television Shakespeare rendition
- Norman Snow in The Tragedy of Romeo and Juliet (1982)
- Victor Spinetti in Romeo.Juliet (1990); depicts feral cats with voiceovers from a cast of British thespians
- John Leguizamo in Baz Luhrmann's Romeo + Juliet (1996), a modernized version of the play
- Patrick Connor as Tyrone in Tromeo and Juliet (1997), a transgressive black comedy interpretation
- Tom Ross in the 2001 French musical Roméo et Juliette.
- Szilveszter P. Szabó in the 2004 Hungarian version of the 2001 French musical. This Tybalt has more of a backstory, and is more sympathetic than in the play.
- 2006 Adam Rayner (actor) Romeo and Juliet Royal Shakespeare Theatre, Stratford-Upon-Avon
- Jason Statham in the animated Gnomeo & Juliet (2011)
- Ed Westwick in the 2013 film adaptation
- Corey Hawkins in the 2013 Broadway re-telling
- Amar Ramasar as Bernardo in the 2020 stage revival of West Side Story
- David Alvarez as Bernardo Nuñez in Steven Spielberg's film remake of West Side Story (2021)
- Alistair Toovey in Rosaline (2022)

== Analysis ==
Draper (1939) points out the parallels between the Elizabethan belief in the four humours and the main characters of the play; Tybalt is choleric: Violent, vengeful, short-tempered, ambitious. Interpreting the text in the light of humours reduces the amount of plot attributed to chance by modern audiences.
