= Other: British and Irish Poetry since 1970 =

Other: British and Irish Poetry since 1970 is a poetry anthology edited by Richard Caddel and Peter Quartermain, and published in 1999 by Wesleyan University Press. According to the Introduction

One purpose of this anthology is ... to uncover what ... The Movement ... helped to bury.

It is therefore self-consciously against what was by then the old mainstream in British poetry. "If any further justification is required for this anthology, we suggest that it lies in the quality and excitement of the poets gathered."

== Poets in Other: British and Irish Poetry since 1970 ==
John Agard - Tony Baker - Anthony Barnett - Richard Caddel - Cris Cheek - Thomas A. Clark - Bob Cobbing- Brian Coffey - Kelvin Corcoran - Andrew Crozier - Fred D'Aguiar - Ken Edwards - Peter Finch - Allen Fisher - Roy Fisher - Veronica Forrest-Thomson - Ulli Freer - Harry Gilonis - Jonathan Griffin - Bill Griffiths - Alan Halsey - Lee Harwood - Michael Haslam - Randolph Healy - John James - Amryl Johnson - Linton Kwesi Johnson - Tom Leonard - Tony Lopez - Rob MacKenzie - Barry MacSweeney - Billy Mills - Geraldine Monk - Eric Mottram - Wendy Mulford - Grace Nichols -Douglas Oliver - Maggie O'Sullivan - Tom Pickard - Elaine Randell - Tom Raworth - Carlyle Reedy - Denise Riley - John Riley - Peter Riley - Maurice Scully - John Seed - Gavin Selerie - Robert Sheppard - Colin Simms - Iain Sinclair - Chris Torrance - Gael Turnbull - Catherine Walsh - Benjamin Zephaniah

== See also ==
- 1999 in poetry
- 1999 in literature
- 20th century in literature
- 20th century in poetry
- English poetry
- Irish poetry
- List of poetry anthologies
