= The New British Poetry =

The New British Poetry 1968-88 is a poetry anthology published in 1988, jointly edited by Gillian Allnutt, Fred D'Aguiar, Ken Edwards and Eric Mottram, respectively concerned with feminist, Black British, younger experimental and British poetry revival poets. The anthology was intended to provide an alternative to mainstream poetry anthologies such as Blake Morrison and Andrew Motion's The Penguin Book of Contemporary British Poetry.

The book's general editor was John Muckle, founder of the Paladin Poetry Series. He attempted to challenge what many saw as a narrowly defined 'mainstream' by creating a book around different strands in radical poetry and four editors who might not otherwise have worked together: "Their differences, both in the shape they have given their selections and in their introductory remarks, make this a many-sided, exciting, unpredictable - and no doubt contentious book."

The anthology's multicultural and counter-cultural stance gave it a strong anti-Thatcherite flavour. The book was widely if critically reviewed and went on to influence a number of subsequent anthologies of British poetry.

== Poets in The New British Poetry ==
- John Agard
- Gillian Allnutt
- Iftikhar Arif
- Tony Baker
- Sophie Behrens
- Asa Benveniste
- James Berry
- Valerie Bloom
- Eavan Boland
- Jean "Binta" Breeze
- Paul Brown
- Richard Caddel
- Brian Catling
- Faustin Charles
- Cris Cheek
- Thomas A. Clark
- Bob Cobbing
- Merle Collins
- Kelvin Corcoran
- Jeni Couzyn
- Andrew Crozier
- David Dabydeen
- Carol Ann Duffy
- Andrew Duncan
- Ken Edwards
- Paul Evans
- Alison Fell
- Peter Finch
- Allen Fisher
- Roy Fisher
- Errol Francis
- Ulli Freer
- Gabriel Gbadamosi
- Glenda George
- Angie Gilligan
- Bill Griffiths
- Caroline Halliday
- Lee Harwood
- Ralph Hawkins
- David Haynes
- A. L. Hendriks
- Selima Hill
- Frances Horovitz
- Libby Houston
- Mahmood Jamal
- John James
- Maria Jastrzębska
- Amryl Johnson
- Linton Kwesi Johnson
- Jackie Kay
- Tom Leonard
- Liz Lochhead
- John C. M. Lyons
- Barry MacSweeney
- E. A. Markham
- Sue May
- David Miller
- Lotte Moos
- Geraldine Monk
- Eric Mottram
- Wendy Mulford
- Grace Nichols
- Jeff Nuttall
- Douglas Oliver
- Albie Ollivierre
- Maggie O'Sullivan
- Evangeline Paterson
- Tom Pickard
- Elaine Randell
- Tom Raworth
- Denise Riley
- Peter Riley
- Michèle Roberts
- Gavin Selerie
- Robert Sheppard
- Colin Simms
- Iain Sinclair
- Lemn Sissay
- Ken Smith
- Janet Sutherland
- Levi Tafari
- Gael Turnbull
- Michelene Wandor
- John Wilkinson

== See also ==
- 1988 in poetry
- 1988 in literature
- 20th century in literature
- 20th century in poetry
- English literature
- List of poetry anthologies

== See also ==
- New British Poetry (2004), edited by Don Paterson and Charles Simic, Graywolf Press, 2004
