= Conductors of Chaos: A Poetry Anthology =

1996 poetry anthology

Conductors of Chaos: A Poetry Anthology is a poetry anthology edited by Iain Sinclair, and published in the United Kingdom in 1996 by Picador.

Sinclair in the Introduction wrote that "The secret history of ... 'the British Poetry Revival' ... is as arcane a field of study as the heresies and schisms of the early Church."

The selection includes both a number of 'Revival' poets, and a few figures chosen as 'precursors', with some deliberate scheme of comment on the contemporary as well as the retrospection involving the 1960s and 1970s.

== Poets in Conductors of Chaos: A Poetry Anthology ==
- Caroline Bergvall
- Brian Catling
- cris cheek
- Kelvin Corcoran
- Andrew Crozier
- J. F. Hendry
- Andrew Duncan
- Allen Fisher
- Bill Griffiths
- Alan Halsey
- Lee Harwood
- Michael Haslam
- Stewart Home
- John James
- Grace Lake
- Tony Lopez
- W. S. Graham
- Barry MacSweeney
- Rod Mengham
- Drew Milne
- David Jones
- Geraldine Monk
- Douglas Oliver
- Maggie O'Sullivan - Out to Lunch (Ben Watson) - Ian Patterson
- J. H. Prynne
- Jeremy Reed
- David Gascoyne
- Denise Riley
- Peter Riley
- Nicholas Moore
- Stephen Rodefer
- Chris Torrance
- John Wilkinson
- Aaron Williamson

== See also ==
- 1996 in poetry
- 1996 in literature
- English poetry
- List of poetry anthologies
