= HardPressed Poetry =

Independent Irish-based poetry publisher

hardPressed poetry was an independent Irish-based poetry publisher run by poets Billy Mills and Catherine Walsh. With the exception of the Irish Arts Council funded magazine, the Journal, they published without outside funding or sponsorship. Founded in 1985, hardPressed poetry operated from Dublin, Barcelona, Eastbourne and Limerick they described themselves as "a small press which publishes poetry that you won't often find in your local bookshop" the Journal had two issues, one in 1999, and one in 2000.

== Published poets ==
They published work by Charles Bernstein, Nicole Brossard, Michael Carlson, Carlota Caulfield, Linda Chown, Brian Coffey, Cid Corman, Theodore Enslin, Matthew Geden, Harry Gilonis, Peter Gizzi, Robert Hampson, Randolph Healy, Fanny Howe, Trevor Joyce, David Lloyd, Sheila Mannix, David Miller, Jordi Valls i Pozo, Tom Raworth, Maurice Scully, Geoffrey Squires, Keith Waldrop, Rosmarie Waldrop, Craig Watson, and Augustus Young and the two editors.
