= Knives, Forks and Spoons Press =

British independent publishing house

Knives, Forks and Spoons Press is an independent publishing house based in Newton-le-Willows, Merseyside, United Kingdom. It was established by Alec Newman in April 2010.

The press publishes avant-garde and experimental poetry, full collections, pamphlets and anthologies. A typical year's output is 24 titles, by new and established poets and artists.

== History ==
The Knives Forks and Spoons Press emerged from The Other Room reading series – a bimonthly night of experimental poetry that takes place in Manchester. The press name was coined by Richard Barrett as a tribute to Kitchen sink realism.

KFS started out as a publisher of poetry pamphlets in 2010, and it was shortlisted for the publisher award in the Michael Marks Awards for Poetry Pamphlets in its first year. In 2012, KFS started publishing full collections of poetry. In 2013, Robert Hampson's Reworked Disasters received a Highly Commended in the Forward Prize For Poetry. In 2014, KFS was awarded Arts Council Funding to publish and promote 10 poets. The press's output has diversified to cover a wider range of experimental styles.

== Authors ==
Poets and artists whose work has been published by KFS include Alan Baker, Wayne Clements, Steven J Fowler, Robert Gavin Hampson Daniele Pantano, Geraldine Monk, Robert Sheppard, Rupert Loydell and George Szirtes.
