= David Annwn Jones =

Anglo-Welsh poet (born 1953)

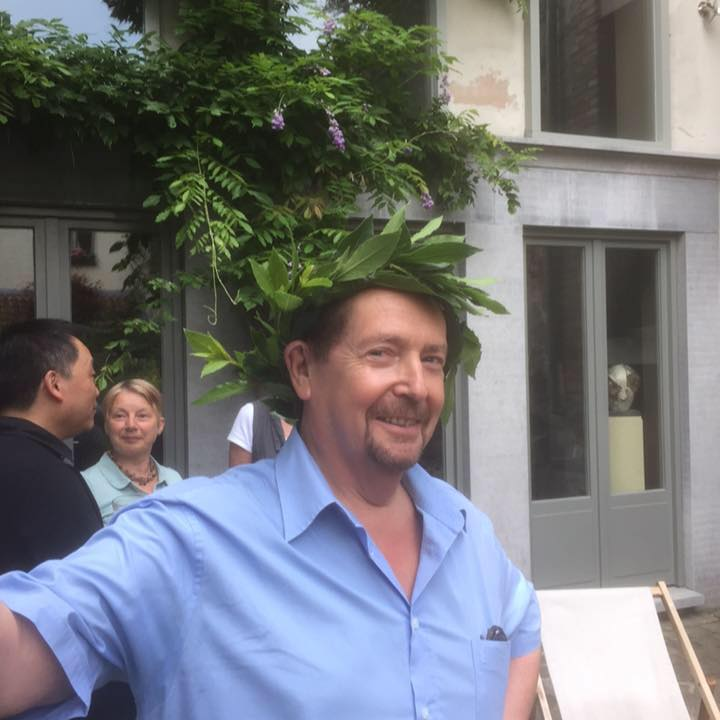
David Annwn Jones

David Annwn (born 9 May 1953), also known as David Annwn Jones, is an Anglo-Welsh poet, critic, teacher, playwright, and magic lanternist.

== Biography ==
Annwn was born David James Jones in Congleton, and brought up in Cheshire. In his undergraduate years at the University of Aberystwyth, Annwn Jones edited Dragon poetry magazine and helped convene the Gallery Poets series at UCW Neuadd Fawr with Rose Simpson, ex-member of the Incredible String Band. In 1973, he met Robert Duncan, a future influencer on his poetry, and studied for his doctorate supervised by Jeremy Hooker.

Annwn taught at Wakefield College and Leeds University from 1981 to 1995, latterly becoming Head of English. With Peter Sansom and Graham Mort, he inaugurated the Northern Association of Writers in Education. Active as an organiser and performer, Annwn collaborated with musician John Cowey and poet Roula Pollard in running poetry/drama events at Wakefield College Theatre and convened reading tours for American writers including Robert Berthof, Black Mountain artist Basil King and Bobby Louise Hawkins.

From 1987–1996, Annwn worked with Frances Presley and Peterjon and Yasmin Skelt. He helped publish the work of a wide range of contemporary poets including Eric Mottram, George Mackay Brown and Lee Harwood. He went on to tutor undergraduate, MA Literature and Creative Writing students for Open University, mainly in Leeds and Manchester, but also in Cardiff, Dublin, Glasgow, and Greece. In August 1996, he presented a paper on Celtic Postmodernism at the ‘Assembling Alternatives" conference at the University of New Hampshire. From 1986 onwards, he was also associated with Black Mountain poet Jonathan Williams and Thomas Meyer's circle of artists meeting at their Corn Close cottage in Dentdale, going on to edit the festschrift Catgut and Blossom, publish Williams’ Metafours for Mysophobes, introduce readings at the Victoria Miro Gallery and write an online study: ‘Mustard and Evening Primrose: the Astringent Extravagance of Jonathan Williams’ metafours’.

An active performer and teacher, Annwn has appeared extensively on the readings circuits and at Carmarthen Arts Festival, Hay-on-Wye Alternative Poetry, Ilkley and Otley Arts Festivals, Beehive Poets, Warrington Arts and many university conferences. Part of his reading at the Other Room Experimental Poetry is available on film. He has been involved particularly with the David Jones Society, and has also given talks for the William Blake Society and the George Mackay Brown Fellowship, Orkney. 2014 saw the culmination of Annwn's six-year project: Prismatic Array involving his multi-medial responses to the work of Barbara Hepworth, Claude Cahun, Maya Deren and Dylan Thomas, culminating in readings and illustrated talks at the Hepworth Gallery, Wakefield, Leeds City Art Gallery and the Dylan Unchained centennial conference, Swansea University.

Since 1981, Annwn has lived in the Wakefield area of West Yorkshire.

== Honors and awards ==
He is a recipient of first prize in the Inter-Collegiate Eisteddfod, the Bunford Prize for the highest mark in English in his university year, the Cardiff International Poetry Prize, a Ferguson Centre award for African and Asian Studies and his study, Sexuality and the Gothic Magic Lantern, was nominated for the Allan Lloyd Smith Memorial Prize.

== Career ==
Islands and Poems

A third of Annwn's doctoral thesis involved the poetry of the Orcadian writer, George Mackay Brown and, after meeting and corresponding with the poet, Annwn went on to write The Binding Breath, concerning the epistemological importance of island in Brown's work. Island-ness became a salient focus for his studies and Annwn went on compile Sea Harvest, an extensive Gazetteer of island poets, and publish Into the Blue, Poems from Åland, Robin Young's translations of Baltic islander, Carina Karlsson's poetry. A Ferguson Centre award allowed Annwn to research the work of Jean Arasanayagam, (Sri Lanka), Marjorie Evasco, (the Philippines), Hsia Yü, (Taiwan) and Angeline Yap, (Singapore). This criticism, often involving Post-colonial and Feminist critiques of identity, was published in works such as Ideya Journal of the Humanities.6 The extensive study ‘Babaylan, Witch, Sorguin’ placed Marjorie Evasco's work within a vast context of female resistance in the volume The Survival of Myth.7

Annwn went on to help Stephen Bradbury with the English versions of Hsia Yü's poetry published in Salsa (2015)

Calligraphy and Poetry

Annwn's work has proved popular with a wide range of contemporary calligraphers. In 2011, celebrated calligrapher, Ann Hechle wrote: I have been reading some of David Annwn's poetry [ and have loved it - so witty, erudite & complex] becoming aware, most of all, of the extraordinary range of cross-referencing going [...]. A kaleidoscope of words constantly shaken up. Annwn has worked closely with celebrated American calligrapher, Thomas Ingmire.

Titles include Tabula Gratulatoria, Out of the air, seismograph jitter, 1762011, Asters of Risk, errant inerrancies, Against the odds/St John's Fragment (2014) Going up to Sun Terrace, Shiva of Liquid Club, A pulse walks in, The Zorn Suite and Mary Shelley's Elisions. Some of the fruits of this collaboration featured in the ‘Form and Expression’ exhibition, the Brunnier Art Museum, Iowa State University in 2014 and are the subject of the essays ‘Flying Through’ 8 and ‘Master Calligrapher’s Diodati Tribute’ 9 and in Annwn's lectures at the Letter Exchange, London and The Society of Scribes, New York.

In his study, ‘Form & Expression : the Written Word’, Bruce Nixon, art critic, writes: ‘Ingmire’s approach to calligraphy as a mode of research, typified by his relationship with Annwn, is especially intriguing. Their collaboration, which began in the early 2000s, is based on ekphrasis, a rhetorical device from antiquity, in which one art medium is described by another, thus heightening its affect for viewers or readers […]As a collaborative undertaking, it is at once conversational and deeply personal.’ 10

In 2011, Annwn was the guest poet at the Sunderland University Writing Symposium and worked with Ewan Clayton, Ann Hechle, Susan Moor, Suzanne Moore, Ayako Tani and Edward Wates. At the Writing 2015 Symposium at Bruges University in 2015, Annwn went on to work with Ewan Clayton, Lieve Cornil, Susan Skarsgard and Brody Neuenschwander, past collaborator with film-maker Peter Greenaway. An exhibition of Annwn's and Thomas Ingmire's collaborative poetry and calligraphy appeared at the California Book Club, San Francisco, 2016.

Gothic and Gothic visuality

In 2006, Annwn discovered Francois d’Orbay's floor-plans for the site of E-A Robertson's famous Parisian Phantasmagoria magic lantern show (1799-1804), a key influence in Gothic writings of the 19th century, including the famous work of Sheridan Le Fanu. This enabled him, with the assistance of visual artist Howard Wood, to create Phantasmagoria, a walk-through film of an evening's entertainment at the ruined convent.

He went on to write, the best-selling critical volume: Gothic Machine, Pre-cinematic Media and Film in Popular Visual Culture 1670-1910 which sold out in four months. Jerrold Hogle wrote of this study: ‘This work remains a significant advance in Gothic and cultural studies.’ This volume was followed by Sexuality and the Gothic Magic Lantern: Desire, Eroticism and Literary Visibilities from Byron to Bram Stoker (Palgrave Gothic). Annwn subsequently wrote a series of articles concerning early Gothic comics, Gothic engravings, calligraphy and dance for ‘The Gothic Imagination’ website convened by Stirling University.

Magic lantern shows include those at the Bram Stoker International Fellowship, (2012) Whitby, the Gothic Festival Manchester (2014) and, as reported in Reuters International News: a specially-devised lycanthropic lantern show at The Company of Wolves’ Conference, University of Hertfordshire (2015).

David Annwn's most recent collection of poems include Bela Fawr's Cabaret (2008) Disco Occident (2013) and Against the Odds/St John's Fragment (2015) and his multi-media plays: Harker's Bizarre and Grimani's Theatre have been performed at Whitby as part of the Bram Stoker Film Festival. Amongst his collaborative works are The Hunting of the Lizopard (with Alan Halsey), It Means Nothing to Me (with Geraldine Monk), DADADOLLZ with Christine Kennedy. He has been interviewed about his poetry many times and can be found in conversation about poetics most recently with Alan Halsey in CUSP, Recollections of poetry in transition.

Nobel Prize-winner, Seamus Heaney has written that Annwn's work is ‘wonderfully sympathetic and accurate.’

== Bibliography ==
Poetry

- Foster the Ghost (1984)
- King Saturn's Book (1987)
- The Other (1988)
- the spirit / that kiss (1993)
- Turbulent Boundaries (1999)
- The Hunting of the Lizopard (2007)
- Bela Fawr's Cabaret (2008)
- Disco Occident (2013)
- Against the Odds/St John's Fragment (2015)
- Going Up To Sun Terrace (2015)

Prose

- Inhabited Voices, Myth and History in the Poetry of Seamus Heaney, Geoffrey Hill and George Mackay Brown, (1984)
- Hear the Voice of the Bard! The Early Bards, William Blake and Robert Duncan, (1995)
- Arcs Through: the Poetry of Maurice Scully, Randolph Healy and Billy Mills, (2001).
- Gothic Machine (2012)
- Sexuality and the Gothic Magic Lantern: Desire, Eroticism and Literary Visibilities from Byron to Bram Stoker (2014)
- Re-envisaging the First Age of Cinematic Horror, 1896-1934 (2018)
- Vampires on the Silent Screen (2023)

Visual works

Annwn's portrait photographs have been used by the Simon and Schuster publishing house and his lettering has appeared in the Knot Art exhibition, Sheffield. His monotypes appear alongside Christine Kennedy's in Dadadollz and in Lava Island, dedicated to Tomas Transtromer. His long-term collaborations with artists Sean and Charlotte Mannion and Alex Ketnor, including the print-art work: Obretto, were shown at Wakefield Arts Festival in 2016. An overview of his print art appears in the Kindle version of The Dark Would.
