= Janet Sutherland =

British poet (born 1957)

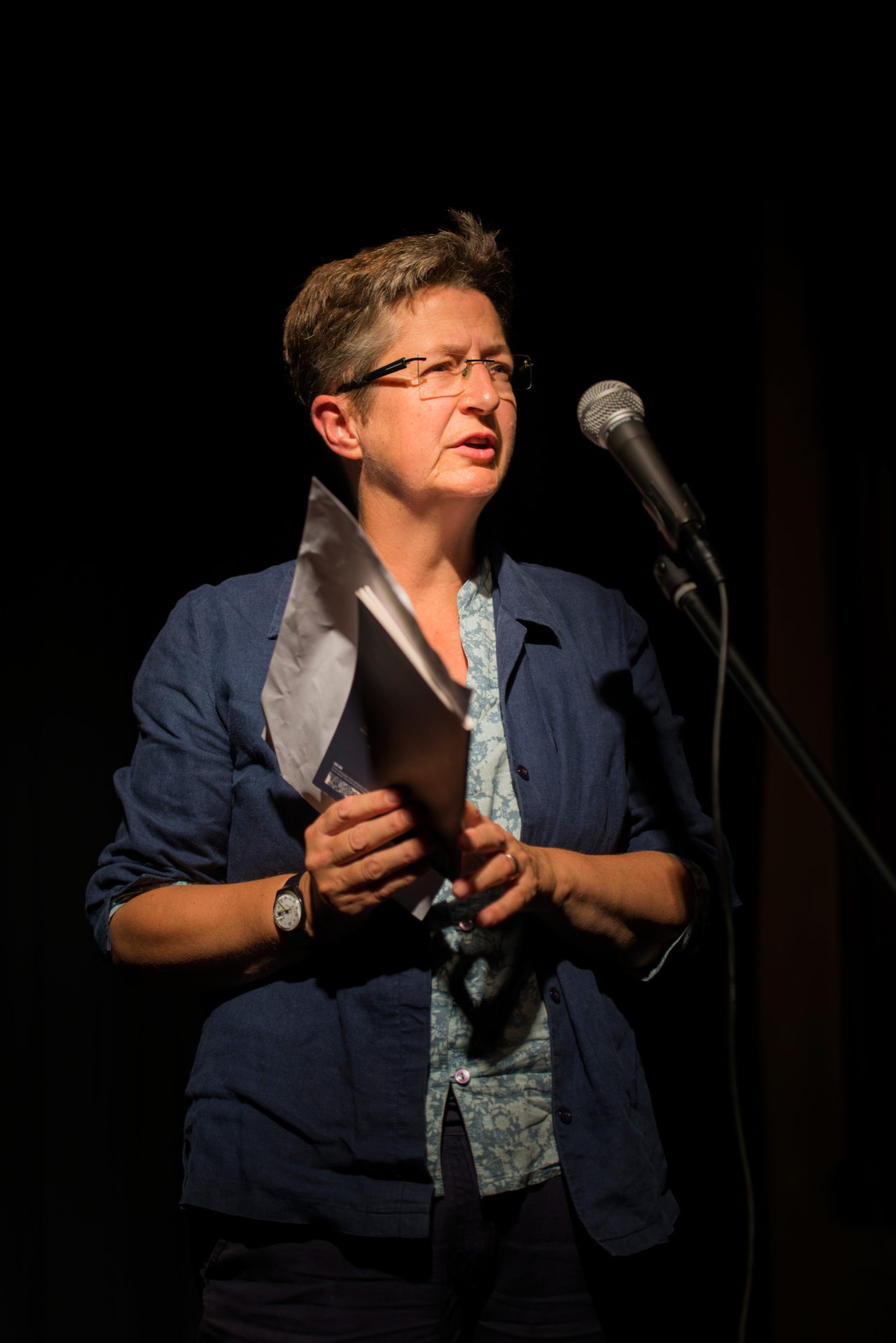
- Sutherland 2015
- Born: 10 June 1957 (age 69); Salisbury
- Education: University of Cardiff English Lit (BA) University of Essex American Poetry (MA)
- Children: 1
- Website: https://www.janetsutherland.co.uk/

Janet Sutherland (born 10 June 1957) is a British poet. She has five full-length collections of poetry, published by Shearsman Books. She is a full time working poet and editor. She is a co-founder of the Needlewriters cooperative which organises quarterly poetry events in Lewes, East Sussex. Her poems are widely anthologised and are published in national and international magazines.

== Early life and education ==
She was raised on a small tenanted dairy farm in Salisbury, Wiltshire where her family milked fifty cows. She went to South Wilts Grammar School for Girls and the University of Cardiff where she graduated with a BA in English Literature, and subsequently to the University of Essex where she graduated with an MA in American Poetry. After university she worked as an adult education woodwork tutor, as a local government officer and for local and national charities before working full time as a poet.

== Career ==
=== Poetry ===
Her early work (in the 1980s) appeared in magazines including Reality Studios, The Rialto and City Limits. Some recordings of her work from a live performance, from this period, are in the British Library sound collection. She was a poetry reviewer for City Limits in London, and other magazines in the 1980s.

In the early 1990s she took a ten-year break from writing. She began writing again, following a move to Lewes in East Sussex in 2001. From that time she has regularly contributed to a range of journals and anthologies, including Shearsman, Poetry Ireland Review, Molly Bloom, Litter, Poetry Review, The Spectator, The Rialto, New Statesman, Poetry Wales, Poetry Salzburg Review and The London Magazine.

Since 2006 she has published five full-length collections of poetry, published by Shearsman Books. David Morley in Poetry Review said of her second collection, Hangmans's Acre, " Elizabeth Bishop’s attentiveness of voice hangs over this whole collection" and J Muckle said of her third collection, Bone Monkey, "Bone Monkey is a book that repays a reader's patience. Janet Sutherland is a fine poet". Hugh Dunkerley in The London Magazine said of Home Farm, her fourth collection, "At a time when both politics and performance poetry seem to be about who can shout loudest, Sutherland’s is a quiet and necessary voice". Her fifth book, The Messenger House, was published in April 2023 and is a hybrid, part history, part poetry, part travelogue, including journals of her great-great-grandfather.

In 2017 she won the first prize in the Kent and Sussex Poetry competition. In 2018 she was awarded a Hawthornden Fellowship. She was awarded an Arts Council England Award in 2010, an Arts Council England Artists’ International Development Fund Award for travel to Hungary and Serbia in 2018, and an Authors’ Foundation grant from the Society of Authors in 2019. She has performed at the Ledbury Poetry Festival in 2008 and at the Nairn Literature Festival in 2019.

Poems have been translated into Serbian Portuguese, Polish and Slovenian.

In 2018 she participated in the Serbian Writers Association 55th Annual International gathering of poets where she read works translated by her translator, Ivanka Radmanovic, in libraries and other venues in Serbia. In the same year she read at the University of Debrecen in Hungary.

=== Reznikoff ===
In 1980 her essay Reznikoff and his Sources was published in Charles Reznokoff Man and Poet. This was subsequently reworked and published as an essay accompanying new editions of Reznikoff's cycle of poems, Holocaust.

== Personal life ==
She lives in Lewes, East Sussex with her partner.

== Works ==
=== Full length collections ===
- The Messenger House, Shearsman Books, 2023, ISBN 978-1848618824
- Home Farm, Shearsman Books, 2019, ISBN 9781848616431
- Bone Monkey, Shearsman Books, 2014, ISBN 9781848613478
- Hangman's Acre,Shearsman Books, 2009, ISBN 9781848610743
- Burning the Heartwood, Shearsman Books, 2006, ISBN 9780907562887

=== Anthologies ===
Her work has also appeared in a number of anthologies, including:

- Midnight Feasts (Children's Anthology), Bloomsbury Publishing, 2019, ISBN 9781472944078
- In Honour of the Artist, Dreammee Little City, 2018 ISBN 9780359305391
- Queer in Brighton (Memoir), New Writing South, 2014, ISBN 9780992826000
- The Bloomsbury Book of Love Poems, Bloomsbury Publishing, 1999, ISBN 0747544174
- The Virago Book of Love Poetry, Virago Press, 1990, ISBN 9781853810305
- The New British Poetry 1968–1988, Paladin Books, 1988, ISBN 9780586087657
- Dancing the Tightrope, The Women's Press, 1987, ISBN 9780704340602
- Angels of Fire: An Anthology of Radical Poetry in the 80's, Chatto and Windus, 1986, ISBN 9780701130749

=== Pamphlets ===
- Crossing Over, Nosuch Press, 1983 ISBN 9780946532001

=== As editor ===
- The Needlewriters Anthology (with Alice Owens), Frogmore Press, 2015 ISBN 9780957068827

=== Essays ===
- Charles Reznokoff Man and Poet; Reznikoff and his Sources, Milton Hindus (ed), The National Poetry Foundation University of Maine at Orono, 1984, ISBN 978-0915032600
- Holocaust; Reznikoff and his Sources, Charles Reznikoff, Black Sparrow Books, 2007, ISBN 9781574232080 & Five Leaves Publications, 2010, ISBN 9780876852316
