= Adrian Clarke (poet) =

British poet

Adrian Clarke is a contemporary British poet. His collections include Skeleton Sonnets (Writers Forum, 2002), Former Haunts (Veer Books, 2004), Possession: Poems 1996-2006 (Veer/Writers Forum Books, 2007), and Eurochants (Shearsman Books, 2010).

First published by Eric Mottram in the Poetry Review winter 1972-73 issue, Clarke founded Angel Exhaust with Steve Pereira in the late 1970s, resurfacing in the mid-1980s with Reading Reverdy and Ghost Measures from Paul Brown's Actual Size press. Then began a long association with Bob Cobbing and Writers Forum which included co-editing AND magazine from 1994. Clarke also co-edited Floating Capital with Robert Sheppard in 1991. After Cobbing's death in 2002, Clarke ran Writers Forum jointly with Lawrence Upton until July 2010 when Clarke resigned. He has been a member of the Veer Books editorial collective since 2010.

A frequent performer of his poetry, he was also part of the performance duo Strèss, with the poet and composer Virginia Firnberg. He lives in Brighton, Sussex in the South of England.

== Publications ==
- Imperfect Copies (Bran's Head Press, 1981)
- Reading Reverdy (Actual Size, 1985)
- Ghost Measures (Actual Size, 1987)
- Spectral Investments (Writers Forum, 1991)
- Obscure Disasters (Writers Forum, 1993)
- Doing the Thing (Writers Forum, 1997)
- Millennial Shades and Three Papers (Writers Forum, 1998)
- Skeleton Sonnets (Writers Forum, 2002)
- Former Haunts (Veer Books, 2004)
- Possession (Veer Books, 2007)
- Eurochants (Shearsman, 2010)
- Drastic Measures (Veer Books, 2010)
- Exiting Through the Singular (Knives Forks & Spoons Press, 2011)
- Excess Measures (Veer Books, 2015)
- Austerity Measures (Contraband Books, 2018)

== See also ==
- Angel Exhaust
- British Poetry Revival
- Conductors of Chaos: A Poetry Anthology
- Writers Forum
