= Angel Exhaust =

British poetry magazine

Angel Exhaust 16

Angel Exhaust is a British poetry magazine founded by Steve Pereira and Adrian Clarke in the late 1970s. Andrew Duncan took over as editor in 1992, and by 1993 it was one of the first poetry magazines to appear regularly on the internet. The magazine is headquartered in Nottingham. It was described as an "important journal" by Simon Perril in The Cambridge Companion to British Poetry, 1945-2010 (2016).

== History ==
Angel Exhaust was started in 1979. The magazine emerged from the Islington Poetry Workshop run by Steve Pereira, and the first two issues were run off on office photocopiers. The initial editors were Pereira and Adrian Clarke. By issue three the magazine had an Arts Council grant and was printed at the Poetry Society. These early issues had featured work by Bob Cobbing and Maggie O'Sullivan. The fourth issue gained attention and established the magazine's reputation. It was duplicated on Bob Cobbing's duplicator and contained so many pages that it needed to be nailed together. During the initial phase the magazine was based in London and Cambridge.

The contributor list ranged across the spectrum of poets writing in Britain in the late 1970s / early 1980s and included: Roy Fuller, Chris Torrance, Allen Fisher, Andrew Crozier, Peter Finch, and Roy Fisher. There were interviews with Bob Cobbing and Eric Mottram, and a range of reviews in which the contributors themselves were criticised. The impression was of a snapshot of poetic activity in Britain at that time.

There was a break after the fourth issue. The magazine returned in 1986 with issue six - the "Authority" issue, with contributions and interviews with Eric Mottram, Kathy Acker, Allen Fisher and Roy Fuller. Issue five never appeared.

After another break the magazine returned with Andrew Duncan and Adrian Clarke as editors in 1992.

== Editors ==
The various editors of Angel Exhaust have been: Steven Pereira; Adrian Clarke; Robert Sheppard; Andrew Duncan; Scott Thurston; Helen Macdonald; Michael Gardiner; Simon Smith; John Goodby; Maurice Scully.

== Internet appearance ==
Though starting out as a print magazine, Angel Exhaust later also became influential through the online version, and was one of the first poetry magazines to appear online in 1993.
