= Blonstein =

Blonstein is a surname. Notable people with the surname include:

- Anne Blonstein (1958–2011), British poet and translator
- Marshall Blonstein (born 20th century), American entertainment industry executive
