= John Muckle =

British writer

John Muckle (born 9 December 1954) is a British writer who has published fiction, poetry and literary criticism.

Born in Kingston-upon-Thames, he grew up in the village of Cobham, Surrey. After qualifying as a teacher and working in London FE colleges, he moved into book publishing, first for literary publisher Marion Boyars, moving on to Grafton Books (later subsumed into HarperCollins) as a paperback copywriter. In the mid-1980s he initiated the Paladin Poetry Series. He was general editor of its flagship anthology The New British Poetry and commissioned a number of other titles, including selected poems of John Ashbery, Lee Harwood and Tom Raworth. The poetry imprint was edited subsequently by writer Iain Sinclair. Muckle worked extensively as a freelance copywriter for Penguin before he returned to teaching.

The Cresta Run, Muckle's first book, was reviewed enthusiastically by Norman Shrapnel in The Guardian: "An identifiable vernacular for this still measurable sector of the populace - working-class if not always working - is amply available and John Muckle's excellent stories prove it. The territory of The Cresta Run is short on dropouts and introverts; it's more a world of sleazy service stations, hot-dog vans and skinheads along the Hog's Back, dangerous sailors hot from the Falklands, people you watch your words with."

In 1989 he received a Hawthornden Writers' Fellowship. Writing of Cyclomotors, John Berger said: "It's a wonderful book - marvellously constructed and of a fidelity to experience such as you only come across with a true storyteller - as distinct from word-spinner." This small, poetic fiction set in the early 1950s was praised by a number of prominent writers. Will Self wrote: "I don't think I've read anything for quite a while - perhaps not since Norman Lewis's memoir Jackdaw Cake - which conjures up quite so effectively this peculiar inter-zone between the behemoth of the city and the hinterland of the country. And on top of all this there is the wrenching portrayal of a family at odds with itself in the most violent fashion, rendered without cant or sentimentality."

Muckle has published further novels, short story and poetry collections and a critical work on British fiction in the 1950s and 1960s. His essays and reviews, mainly on poetry and poets, including Allen Ginsberg, Ed Dorn, Bill Griffiths, Tom Raworth, Denise Riley and Lee Harwood, have appeared in a number of journals.

== Bibliography ==
It Is Now As It Was Then (with Ian Davidson, poetry, Mica Press/Actual Size, 1983)

The Cresta Run (short stories, Galloping Dog Press, 1987)

Bikers (with Bill Griffiths, Amra Imprint, 1990)

Cyclomotors (illustrated novella, Festival Books, 1997)

Firewriting and Other Poems (Shearsman Books, 2005)

London Brakes (novel – Shearsman Books, 2010)

My Pale Tulip (novel – Shearsman Books, 2012)

Little White Bull: British Fiction in the Fifties and Sixties (criticism – Shearsman Books, 2014)

Falling Through (novel - Shearsman Books, 2017)

Mirrorball (poetry - Shearsman Books, 2018)

Late Driver (stories - Shearsman Books, 2020)

Snow Bees (novel - Shearsman Books, 2023)

As editor

The New British Poetry 1968-88 (eds Allnutt, D’Aguiar, Edwards, Mottram – General Editor – Paladin, 1988)

Active in Airtime - a journal of poetry and fiction (with Ralph Hawkins and Ben Raworth, 1992-95)
