= Paladin Poetry Series =

Paladin Poetry was a series of paperback books published by Grafton Books (later amalgamated into HarperCollins) under its Paladin imprint, intended to bring modernist and radical poetry before a wider audience. Its founding anthology The New British Poetry 1968-88 attempted to revive the fortunes of the modernist tradition, to correct the gender imbalance of previous anthologies and to bring a new generation of ‘Black British’ poets to prominence. The series was originally edited by writer John Muckle, then Grafton’s editorial copywriter (1985–88), and later by the London writer Iain Sinclair. Many of the Paladin Poetry books were paperback originals. The entire poetry series was pulped within months of the publication of its last titles. However, it did affect poetry readers and had a considerable influence on the output of other poetry publishers, such as Bloodaxe, Penguin, Carcanet and Salt.

== Paladin Poetry titles ==
- John Ashbery, Selected Poems (expanded edition) (1987)
- The New British Poetry 1968-88 (eds Gillian Allnutt, Fred D'Aguiar, Ken Edwards, Eric Mottram) (1988)
- Lee Harwood, Crossing the Frozen River (selected poems) (1988)
- Tom Raworth, Tottering State (selected poems) (1988)
- Iain Sinclair, Flesh Eggs and Scalp Metal (selected poems) (1989)
- Hans Magnus Enzensberger, The Sinking of the Titanic (1989)
- A Various Art (eds Crozier and Longville) (1989)
- Christopher Middleton, Selected Writings (1990)
- John Ashbery, April Galleons (1990)
- Douglas Oliver, Three Variations of the Theme of Harm (selected poetry and prose) (1990)
- Octavio Paz, The Collected Poems 1957-1987 (1991)
- William Carlos Williams, Collected Poems (1991)
- Gregory Corso, Mindfield (selected poems) (1992)
- Octavio Paz, On Poets and Others (essays) (1992)
- Jeremy Reed, Red-Haired Android (1992)
- Future Exiles, 3 London Poets: Allen Fisher, Bill Griffiths, Brian Catling (Re:Active Anthology 1, ed Sinclair) (1992)
- Ghosts in the Corridor: Andrew Crozier, Donald Davie, C.H. Sisson (Re:Active Anthology 2, ed Sinclair) (1992)
- The Tempers of Hazard: Thomas A. Clark, Barry MacSweeney, Chris Torrance (Re:Active Anthology 3, ed Sinclair) (1993)

== Sources ==
- Gillian Allnutt, in Binary myths 2: Correspondences with Poet-Editors (Andy Brown, ed.) (Stride, 1999)
- Charles Bernstein, My Way: Speeches and Poems (University of Chicago, 1999)
- Richard Caddel, interviewed in Contemporary Views on the Little Magazine Scene (Wolfgang Görtschacher, Andreas Schachermayr, eds.) (University of Salzburg, 2000)
- Elaine Jordan, in Writing: A Woman's Business : Women, Writing and the Marketplace (Judy Simons, Kate Fullbrook, eds.) (Manchester University Press, 1998)
- Iain Sinclair, Lights Out for the Territory (Granta Books, 1997)
- Robert Sheppard, The Poetry of Saying: British Poetry and Its Discontents 1950-2000 (Liverpool University Press, 2005) p 152
- Simon Smith interviewed in Tim Allen, Andrew Duncan (eds), Don't Start Me Talking: Interviews with Contemporary Poets (Salt Publishing, 2008)p 365
