= Vampires in Silent Cinema =

- Publisher: Edinburgh University Press
- Publication date: 2024

Vampires in Silent Cinema is a 2024 academic book by Gary D. Rhodes, published by Edinburgh University Press.

== Content ==
Rhodes examines the history of vampire films from 1896's The House of the Devil to the late 1920s. Since many of the films discussed are considered lost, Rhodes relies on production stills, novelizations, reviews, and other material.

== Reception ==
Andrew M. Boylan of the Journal of Vampire Studies compares the book to David Annwn Jones's Vampires on the Silent Screen, stating that while Jones has an international view Rhodes primarily focuses on American cinema. Critic Mario Naves published a review for The New York Sun on March 7, 2024 where he expressed that Rhodes approaches Nosferatu in a novel manner and that the book comes recommended for people interested in the undead. Dávid Szőke, writing for the journal Film International, states that the book is "a carefully detailed account of the vampire archetype’s journey from literary and folkloric origins to the silent screen, which explains how early visual narratives enriched the vampire’s complex and uncanny character. Through previously unexplored press material about several vampire films, now considered to be lost, Rhodes paints a vivid picture of how audiences and critics of the early 20th century responded to these visual representations."
