= Lilith and Ly =

- Lilith und Ly
- Directed by: Erich Kober
- Written by: Fritz Lang
- Starring: Elga Beck; Hans Marschall; Ernest Escherich; Fritz Kammauf
- Cinematography: Willy Hameister
- Production company: Fiat Films
- Release date: 1919
- Running time: 65 minutes

Lilith and Ly (German: Lilith und Ly) is a 1919 lost Austrian vampire film directed by Erich Kober and written by Fritz Lang. The film combines the vampire legend with that of the golem. The film is a rare example from the 1910s of depicting a vampire as an explicitly supernatural blood consuming being, instead of depicting it symbolically.

== Production ==
The script might have been the first written by Lang, and may have been made by him during a hospital stay. Contemporary news coverage of the film claim that Lang was inspired by Sanskrit writings he had encountered during travels in Asia. The film was part of a larger trend of occult films during the period in Austria.

== Plot ==
The film is about an inventor named Frank who uses an inscribed ruby to bring a statue of the mythical Lilith to life. The two begin to live together as a couple, but one day Frank cuts his hand on broken glass and Lilith consumes his blood. Frank then abandons Lilith and falls in love with a woman named Ly. Lilith impersonates Ly and tries to have diner with him. Frank manages to destroy Lilith with a Tibetan sword, and throws away her heart (the ruby), but is forbidden by Ly's father to see her again.

In contrast to many other versions of vampires where mirrors and photographs are unable to capture a vampire's image, the film instead has Lilith exist and move around within glass screens.

== Reception ==
The film was originally released in 1919 and was met with positive reception. Soon after the film production company, Fiat Films, went bankrupt and the film was sold to another studio. The studio then rereleased it with the title Das Kind des Teufels (The Child of the Devil) the same year, and later under the title Der Vampyr im Spiegel (The Vampire in the Mirror) in 1921. Fragments from the film's 1919 rerelease survives, but it is otherwise considered a lost film.

== Analysis ==
In his book Vampires on the Silent Screen David Annwn Jones interpreted the film as being a commentary on imperialist capitalists ignoring the taboos of indigenous peoples.

== See also ==
- List of vampire films
