= Billy Mills (poet) =

Irish experimental poet (born 1954)

- Born: July 24, 1954 (age 72); Dublin
- Citizenship: Irish
- Occupations: Poet, Reviewer
- Partner: Catherine Walsh

Billy Mills (born 1954) is an Irish experimental poet and the founder and co-editor, with Catherine Walsh, of the hardPressed poetry imprint and the Journal. hardPressed publishes and distributes mainly Irish poetry "that you won't often find in your local bookshop".

Mills was born in Dublin and lived in Barcelona between 1986 and 1989, after which he taught English in Eastbourne in the UK until 1995. He lives in Limerick. He was a regular contributor to The Guardian's book blog from 2008 to 2016, and is occasional contributor to the Dublin Review of Books.

== Early work ==
Mills' earliest poems, written and occasionally published in his teens and early twenties are now lost. His first known publication is four poems included in The Beau 3, edited by the modernist poet Maurice Scully, and included in his 1985 debut collection, Genesis & Home; the first publication from hardPressed poetry. This was followed a year later by the pamphlets On First Looking into Lorine Niedecker and A Small Love Song, the latter published by John Kelly's Red Wheelbarrow Press. A second full-length book, Triple Helix was issued by hardPressed poetry in 1987. His first book from an established publisher was the 1990 Letters from Barcelona from John F. Deane's Dedalus Press.

== Later work ==
While living in the UK, Mills made contacts with publishers there, and as a result his next books were UK published. These were The Properties of Stone, published by Bob Cobbing's Writers Forum in 1996 and 5 Easy Pieces from Shearsman Books in 1997. These were followed by two titles from Randolph Healy's Wild Honey Press: Tiny Pieces (1998) and A Small Book of Songs (1999) In 2000, hardPressed poetry issued What is a Mountain? as a limited edition of 26 numbered and signed copies Japanese sewn. In 2009, Shearsman published Lares / Manes — Collected Poems, a volume that brought together all his published work along with several previously unpublished sequences. In 2011, Carol Rumens included 'Tiny Pieces' from this book as her Poem of the Week on The Guardian's books blog. His most recent books are Imaginary Gardens, and Loop Walks published by hardPressed poetry in 2012 and 2014 respectively, The City Itself from Hesterglock Press in 2017 and a book of sounds (Shearsman, 2024). Rumens included sections from this last book as her January 27th, 2025 Poem of the Week.

In 2018, Mills was recorded reading sections from Imaginary Gardens, and Loop Walks for the University College Dublin Special Collections.

Mills collaborated with the Dublin-based composer David Bremner's on his Loop Walks, which was performed at the Béal Festival in Dublin in 2012. A recording of the performance was accompanied by a booklet, and video available online. Bremner set Four on a two-hour-long cantata performed in 2018, set for Baroque instruments, voices and electronics. The text is included in Mills' a book of sounds. Most recently, Bremner's song cycle Logical Fallacies, setting various pieces by Mills, was included on his CD Mixed Circuits released on the farpoint recordings label in 2022. The cycle was originally commissioned by Limerick City of Culture 2014 and performed on 26 September 2014 at the Irish World Academy of Music and Dance, University of Limerick.

== Critical response ==
Writing in the Irish University Review issue 46.1 (2016), Professor Alex Davis of University College Cork notes: "The humble, even laconic, recognition that one exists within 'the weave of things' prompts, as its inevitable corollary, the belief that the function of poetry is to describe – however approximately or provisionally – our embeddedness in the material world."

In the same issue, Professor J.C.C. Mays said of Mills' Imaginary Gardens: "But the poem hasn't gone a long way round just to deliver this: the end is as indeterminate as the beginning. The two poles are matched by opposites within the poem like images of man and nature, water and land, straight and curved, day and night; and their 'certain symmetry' (p.3) is the mainspring of the poem's trembling energy. Each separate poem opens new connections and fresh incongruities. If they ever came wholly together, the world of the poem would implode."

In his book Coleridge's Dejection Ode, Mays writes: "There are, of course, writers who persist in doing what they feel they have to do and succeed willy-nilly in the popular way of success, either to their dismay or indifference because it was never the point. I give as examples Billy Mills (in Ireland), Susan Howe (USA) and J. H. Prynne (UK), although the assumption that they write for themselves is entirely my own".

== Works ==
- Genesis and Home (hardPressed poetry, 1985)
- On First Looking into Lorine Niedecker (hardPressed poetry, 1986)
- A Small Love Song (Red Wheelbarrow Press, 1986 – folded broadsheet)
- Triple Helix (hardPressed poetry, 1987)
- Letters from Barcelona (Dedalus, 1990)
- Properties Of Stone (Writers Forum, London, 1996)
- 5 Easy Pieces (Shearsman, Plymouth, 1997)
- Horace: 5 Traductions (Form Books, London, 1997)
- Tiny Pieces (Wild Honey, Dublin, 1998)
- A Small Book of Songs (Wild Honey, 1999)
- What is a Mountain? (hardPressed poetry, 2000)
- Lares/Manes: Collected Poems (Shearsman, 2009)
- Imaginary Gardens (hardPressed poetry, 2012)
- Loop Walks (hardPressed poetry 2014 limited edition of 50)
- The City Itself (Hesterglock Press, 2017)
- a book of sounds (Shearsman, 2024)
