= Tony Lopez (poet) =

Tony Lopez (born 1950) is an English poet who first began to be published in the 1970s. His writing was at once recognised for its attention to language, and for his ability to compose a coherent book, rather than a number of poems accidentally printed together. He is best known for his book False Memory (The Figures, 1996), first published in the United States and much anthologised.

== Life ==
Lopez grew up in Brixton, South London, and was educated at local state schools including Henry Thornton Grammar School. He worked as a freelance writer of fiction, publishing five crime and science fiction novels with New English Library between 1973 and 1976, before going to the University of Essex (1977–80), and then taking up a research studentship at Gonville and Caius College, Cambridge, where J. H. Prynne supervised his PhD on the Scottish poet W. S. Graham. He taught briefly at the University of Leicester (1986–87) and the University of Edinburgh (1987–89), and then for twenty years at the University of Plymouth (1989–2009), where he was appointed the first Professor of Poetry in 2000 and Emeritus Professor in 2009. He has received awards from the Wingate Foundation, the Society of Authors, the UK Arts and Humanities Research Council and Arts Council, England. His poetry is featured in The Art of the Sonnet (Harvard), Anthology of Twentieth-Century British and Irish Poetry (Oxford University Press), Vanishing Points: New Modernist Poems (Salt), The Reality Book of Sonnets (RSE), Other: British and Irish Poetry since 1970 (Wesleyan University Press) and Conductors of Chaos (Picador). His critical writings are collected in Meaning Performance: Essays on Poetry (Salt) and The Poetry of W. S. Graham (Edinburgh University Press).

Lopez is married with two grown-up children and lives in Exmouth in Devon.

== Bibliography ==
- Snapshots, London: Oasis Books, 1976
- Change, London: New London Pride, 1978
- The English Disease, London: Skyline Press, 1978
- A Handbook of British Birds, Durham, UK: Pig Press, 1982
- Abstract & Delicious, Warehorne, UK: Secret Books, 1982
- The Poetry of W. S. Graham, Edinburgh, UK: Edinburgh University Press, 1989
- A Theory of Surplus Labour, Cambridge, UK: Curiously Strong, 1990
- Stress Management, Manuden, UK: Boldface Press, 1994
- Negative Equity, Cambridge, UK: Equipage, 1995
- False Memory, Great Barrington, MA: The Figures, 1996
- Data Shadow, London: Reality Street, 2000
- Devolution, Great Barrington, MA: The Figures, 2000
- False Memory (new edition), Cambridge, UK: Salt, 2003
- Equal Signs, Cambridge, UK: Equipage, 2004
- Meaning Performance: Essays on Poetry, Cambridge, UK: Salt, 2006
- Covers, Cambridge, UK: Salt, 2007
- Poetry & Public Language (co-edited with Anthony Caleshu), Exeter, UK: Shearsman, 2007
- Darwin, Dartington, UK: Acts of Language, 2009
- Only More So, New Orleans: LA: University of New Orleans Press, 2011; Bristol, UK: Shearsman, 2012
- The Text Festivals: Language Art and Material Poetry (ed.), Plymouth, UK: University of Plymouth Press, 2013
