= The Angry Brigade =

British urban guerilla group (1970–1972)

- Angry Brigade Resistance Movement
- Logo associated with the Angry Brigade, used on the cover of The Angry Brigade by Gordon Carr
- Dates active: 1968–1972, 1980s
- Active regions: England
- Ideology: Anarcho-communism; Anti-imperialism; Anti-monarchism
- Political position: Far-left
- Status: Defunct

The Angry Brigade was a British terrorist group responsible for a series of armed actions against the establishment in England between 1970 and 1972. Using small bombs, they targeted banks, embassies, a BBC Outside Broadcast vehicle, and the homes of Conservative Members of Parliament (MPs). In total, police attributed 25 bombings to the Angry Brigade. The bombings mostly caused property damage; one person was slightly injured. Of the eight people who stood trial, known as the Stoke Newington Eight, four were acquitted. John Barker, along with Hilary Creek, Anna Mendelssohn and Jim Greenfield, were convicted on majority verdicts, and sentenced to ten years. In a 2014 interview, Barker described the trial as political, but acknowledged that "they framed a guilty man".

== History ==
In mid-1968, demonstrations took place in London, centred on the US embassy in Grosvenor Square against US involvement in the Vietnam War. One of the organisers of these demonstrations, Tariq Ali, stated that he recalls being approached by someone representing the Angry Brigade who wished to bomb the embassy. Ali told him that it was a "terrible idea," and no bombing took place.

The Angry Brigade decided to launch a bombing campaign with small bombs in order to maximise media exposure to their demands while keeping collateral damage to a minimum. The campaign started in August 1970 and continued for a year until arrests took place the following summer. Targets included banks, embassies, a BBC Outside Broadcast vehicle earmarked for use in the coverage of the 1970 Miss World event, and the homes of Conservative Members of Parliament (MPs). In total, police attributed 25 bombings to the Angry Brigade. The bombings mostly caused property damage, although one person was slightly injured.

The Angry Brigade also made two assassination attempts. On 12 January 1971, the brigade attempted to kill British Employment Secretary Robert Carr with two bombs at his home. Although the house suffered severe damage, nobody was killed or injured. A little under four months later, on 4 May 1971, a bomb was attached to the bottom of Lady Beaverbrook's car, but it was discovered before it could explode.

In the 1980s, the Angry Brigade resurfaced as the Angry Brigade Resistance Movement, part of the Irish Republican Socialist Movement (IRSM).

== Trial ==
Jack Leonard Prescott(26) and Ian Donald Purdie(24), were arrested and tried in 1971 for conspiracy and causing an explosion in St James Square during December 1970, and an explosion at the home of Robert Carr, minister for employment, on 12 January 1971. Witnesses claiming detailed prison cell admissions by Prescott also denied any interest in a £10,000 reward..

Melford Stevenson sentenced Prescott, known as Jake, whose origins were in the mining community of Dunfermline, to 15 years imprisonment (later reduced to 10), mostly spent in Category A high security prisons. Later, Prescott said he realised then that he "was the one who was angry and the people [he] met were more like the Slightly Cross Brigade". The other members of the group from north-east London, the "Stoke Newington Eight", were prosecuted for carrying out bombings as the Angry Brigade in one of the longest criminal trials of English history (it lasted from 30 May to 6 December 1972). At the conclusion of the trial, John Barker, Jim Greenfield, Hilary Creek and Anna Mendelssohn received prison sentences of 10 years. A number of other defendants were found not guilty, including Stuart Christie, who had previously been imprisoned in Spain for carrying explosives with the intent to assassinate the Spanish dictator General Franco, and Angela Mason who became a director of the LGBT rights group Stonewall and was awarded an OBE for services to homosexual rights.

In February 2002, Prescott apologised for his role in bombing Robert Carr's house and called on other members of the Angry Brigade to also come forward.

== Popular culture ==
On 3 February 2002, The Guardian reported a history of the Angry Brigade and an update on what its former members were doing then. On 9 August 2002, BBC Radio 4 aired Graham White's historical drama, The Trial of the Angry Brigade. Produced by Peter Kavanagh, this was a reconstruction of the trial combined with other background information. The cast included Kenneth Cranham, Juliet Stevenson, Tom Hiddleston and Mark Strong.

In 2009, family care activist and novelist Erin Pizzey won a libel case against Macmillan Publishers after Andrew Marr's History of Modern Britain had falsely linked her to the Angry Brigade. The publisher also recalled and destroyed the offending version of the book, and republished it with the error removed. The link to the Angry Brigade was made in 2001, in an interview with The Guardian, in which the article states that she was "thrown out" of the feminist movement after threatening to inform police about a planned bombing by the Angry Brigade of the clothes shop Biba. "I said that if you go on with this – they were discussing bombing Biba [the legendary department store in Kensington] – I'm going to call the police in, because I really don't believe in this".

The group and trial feature in Jake Arnott's 2006 novel Johnny Come Home. Hari Kunzru's 2007 novel My Revolutions is inspired by the Angry Brigade. The Angry Brigade is a 2014 play by James Graham.

== See also ==
- Terrorist attacks in London
- Walsall Anarchists
- Urban Guerrilla (Hawkwind)
- First of May Group
- Anarchism in the United Kingdom
- Black Mask
- King Mob
- Movement 2 June
