= Jordi Valls i Pozo =

Spanish poet

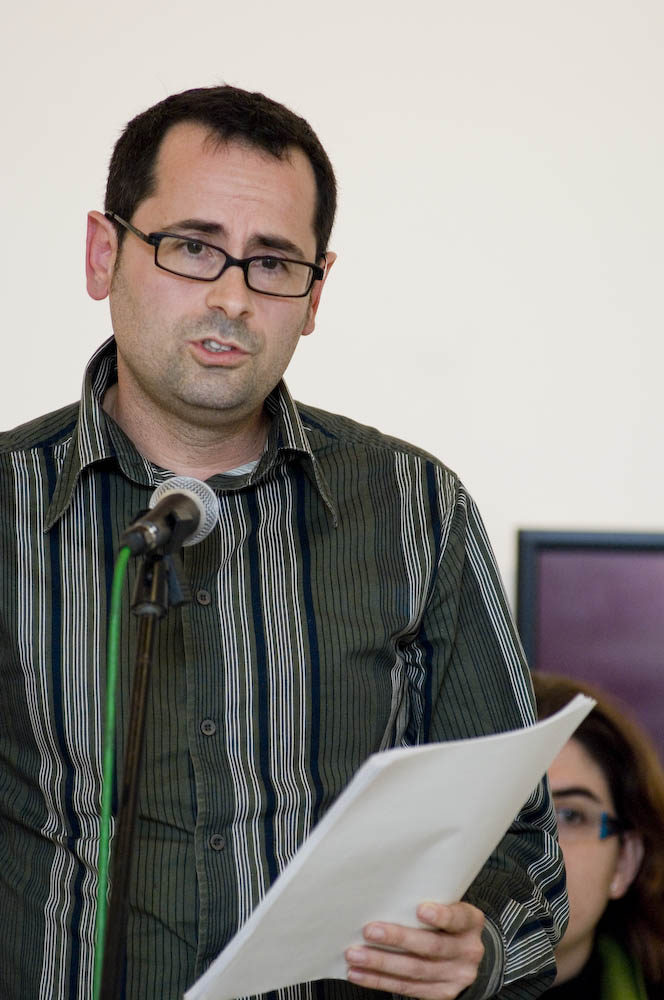
Jordi Valls at Còdols, Biennal of Catalan poetry (Cerdanyola del Vallès) 2007

Jordi Valls i Pozo (born in Barcelona, January 25, 1970) is a Catalan poet.

== Biography ==
He has lived in Santa Coloma de Gramenet, a city that strongly impressed his poetic trajectory, for the majority of his life.

Jordi Valls presided The Associació de Joves Escriptors en Llengua Catalana (Association of Young Catalan Language Writers) from 1994 to 1996, and is a member of The Associació d'Escriptors en Llengua Catalana (AELC) and The PEN Club Català (Catalan PEN Club).

Having won The Jocs Florals de la Llengua Catalana in 2006, he was the first author who holds the office of City Poet. Ernest Farrés, author of the anthology called 21 poetes del XXI (2001), states that "In the hands of Jordi Valls poetry is not only subversion but it is most of all the essence of the literary fact".

He has invited to festivals international poetry: Days of poetry and wine, Medana, Slovenia 2008, Encuentro Internacional de Poesía Ciudad de México 2015, Festival International Poetry Bucharest 2017, Festival de Poesía “Luna de Locos” Pereira, Colombia, 2017.

The poetic work of Jordi Valls has been translated into spanish, english, italian, slovenian, brazilian, romanian, occitan.

== Published books ==
- D'on neixen les penombres? (Premi Martí Dot de poesia 1994)
- Natura morta (Premi Vila de Martorell 1998)
- Oratori (Premi Senyoriu d'Ausiàs March 1999)
- La mel d'Aristeu (Premi de poesia Gorgos 2003)
- La mà de batre (Premi Grandalla de poesia 2005)
- Violència gratuïta (Premi Jocs Florals 2006)
- Última oda a Barcelona Amb la coautoria de Lluís Calvo. Santa Coloma de Gramenet: La Garúa 2008.
- Felix Orbe - Editorial Denes 2010.
- Ni un pam de net al tancat dels ànecs -El Pont del Petroli 2011.
- Mal -Editorial Meteora 2013.
- L'illa misteriosa Editorial Meteora 2015. (Premi Cadaqués a Rosa Leveroni 2014)
- Guillem Tell Adia Editors 2016.
- Pollo Tanit 2019.
- Penumbras Godall 2019.
- Pla 10 de l'espai exterior 3i4 2021. (Premi Octubre V.A.Estellés 2020)

== Anthologies ==
- Milenio. Ultimísima poesía española (antologia) Sial 1999. Spanish
- Dnevi poezije in vina (anthology) 2008. Slovenian/English
- Erato bajo la piel del deseo (antología) Sial 2010. Spanish
- La lengua lemosina (antologia) Ed. Medianoche 2010. Spanish. Mexico.
- Trentaquattro poeti catalani pel il XXI secolo (anthology). Raffaelli 2014. Italian.
- Mal Valparaiso 2015. Spanish
- Male Eva Edizione 2015. Italian
- En el ombligo de la luna. Antología de poetas del mundo (antologia) Valparaiso 2015. Spanish. Mexico
- Xeixa. Fourteen catalan poets (anthology). Marlon L. Fick, Paquita Esteve. Tupelo Press 2018. USA. English
- Game on/ Evil, Guillem Tell. Maurice Scully, Jordi Valls (translator Raoul Izzard). HardPressed Poetry 2019. Ireland. English
