= W. S. Graham =

Scottish poet

William Sydney Graham
- Born: 19 November 1918; Greenock, Scotland
- Died: 9 January 1986 (aged 67); Madron, Cornwall, England
- Education: Stow College, Glasgow; Newbattle Abbey College
- Occupation: Poet
- Spouse: Agnes Kilpatrick Dunsmuir (Nessie Dunsmuir)
- Children: Rosalind Mudaliar
- Writing career
- Language: English
- Notable works: Cage Without Grievance; The White Threshold; The Nightfishing; Malcolm Mooney's Land
- Notable awards: Atlantic Award for Literature (1947); Civil List pension (1974)
- Literary movement: Neo-romanticism

William Sydney Graham (19 November 1918 – 9 January 1986) was a Scottish poet, who was often associated with Dylan Thomas and the neo-romantic group of poets. Graham's poetry was mostly overlooked in his lifetime; however, partly thanks to the support of Harold Pinter, his work was eventually acknowledged. He was represented in the second edition of the Penguin Book of Contemporary Verse (Harmondsworth, UK, 1962) and the Anthology of Twentieth-Century British and Irish Poetry (Oxford University Press, 2001).

== Early life and work ==
Graham was born in Greenock. In 1932, he left school to become an apprentice draughtsman and then studied structural engineering at Stow College, Glasgow. He was awarded a bursary to study literature for a year at Newbattle Abbey College in 1938. Graham spent the war years working at a number of jobs in Scotland and Ireland before moving to Cornwall in 1944. His first book, Cage Without Grievance was published in 1942.

== Graham and the neo-romantics ==
The 1940s were prolific years for Graham, and he published four more books during that decade. These were The Seven Journeys (1944), 2ND Poems (1945), The Voyages of Alfred Wallis (1948) and The White Threshold (1949). The style of these early poems led critics to see Graham as part of the neo-romantic group that included Dylan Thomas and George Barker. The affinities between these three poets derive from a common interest in poets like Gerard Manley Hopkins, Arthur Rimbaud and Hart Crane, and, in the case of Thomas and Graham, a taste for the Bohemian lifestyle of the London literary scene.

In 1947, Graham received the Atlantic Award for Literature, and lectured at New York University whilst spending a year on a reading touring of the United States. He moved to London to be nearer the hub of its Bohemian world. Here he came into contact with T. S. Eliot, then editor of Faber and Faber, who published The White Threshold, which includes varied recollections of his childhood and youth in Scotland. Faber and Faber remained Graham's publishers for the rest of his life.

== The Nightfishing and legacy ==
In 1954, Graham returned to Cornwall to live near the St Ives, Cornwall artists' colony. Here he became friendly with several of the resident painters, including Bryan Wynter and Roger Hilton. The following year, Faber and Faber published his The Nightfishing, a book whose title poem marked a dramatic change in Graham's poetry. The poem moved on from his earlier style and moved away from the neo-romantic/apocalyptic tag. Unfortunately for the poet, the poem's appearance coincided with the rise of the Movement with their open hostility to the neo-romantics. Despite the support of Eliot and Hugh MacDiarmid, the book was neither a critical nor a popular success.

It was to be fifteen years before Graham published another book, Malcolm Mooney's Land (1970). This, and his last book, Implements in Their Places are truly original and enduring poetic achievements, for which Graham is slowly coming to be recognised. For many years, he had lived in semi-poverty on his income as a writer, but in 1974 he received a Civil List pension of £500 per year. Perhaps because of this alleviation of his financial circumstances, Graham began to publish with more frequency, with Implements in their Places (1977), Collected Poems 1942–1977 (1979) and an American-published Selected Poems (1980). He died in Madron, Cornwall in 1986. His last collection Aimed at Nobody was published posthumously in 1993, and a book of Uncollected Poems appeared in 1990. Faber brought out a new Selected Poems in 1996. The Nightfisherman: Selected Letters was published in 1999 and New Collected Poems in 2005.

All of Graham's poems have a location, a plot and setting (or narrative) as Graham insisted "the first act of engagement of reader and poem was in reading it aloud. This tested the syntax, pace and tone of poem and reader."

Posthumous publication activity indicates Graham's reputation has grown in recent years. Some might argue this is partly due to Harold Pinter's often-expressed enthusiasm for the poet, or attribute his increasing recognition to the widespread advocacy of poets associated with the British Poetry Revival. However, Graham's work was represented in the anthology Conductors of Chaos (1996) by a selection introduced by the poet and critic Tony Lopez, who also wrote a book-length study, The Poetry of W. S. Graham (1989).

== Marriage, death and recognition ==
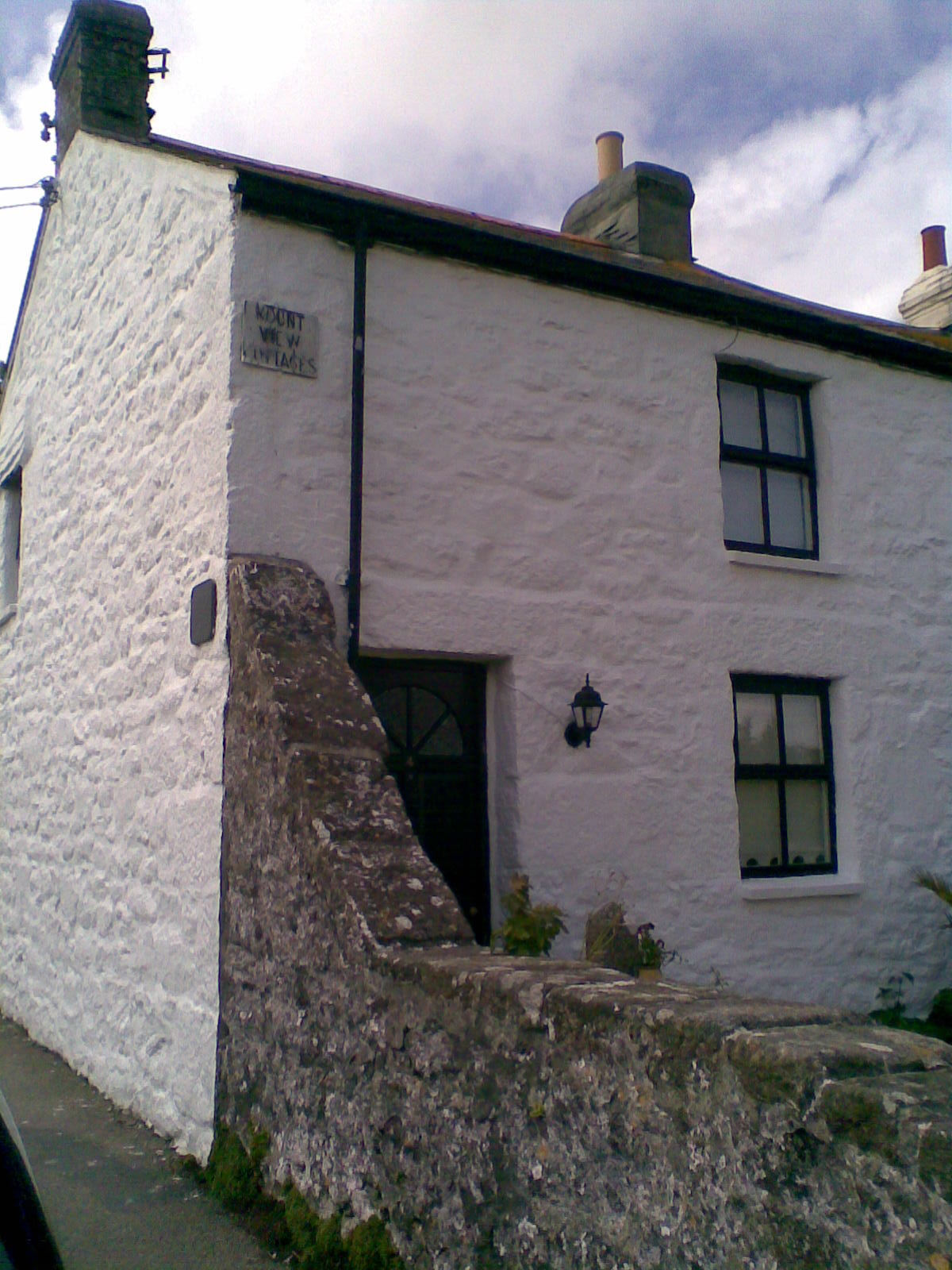
The Grahams' home in Madron

He married another poet, Agnes Kilpatrick Dunsmuir (1909–1999), known as Nessie Dunsmuir. Graham died on 9 January 1986, aged 67. In 2006, 20 years after his death, memorial plaques were unveiled in Fore Street, Madron where he spent his final years, and at his birthplace, 1 Hope Street, Greenock.

In an event to mark his centenary year, a memorial stone to Graham was unveiled in the Makars' Court, Edinburgh on 14 June 2018, and Graham's daughter Rosalind Mudaliar donated his writing chair to the Scottish Poetry Library. Copyright in Graham's works is held by his daughter, Rosalind Mudaliar.

== Bibliography ==
=== Poetry books ===
- Cage without Grievance, Parton Press, 1942
- The Seven Journeys, William MacLellan, 1944
- 2ND Poems, Nicholson and Watson, 1945
- The White Threshold, Faber and Faber, 1949
- The Nightfishing, Faber and Faber, 1955
- Malcolm Mooney’s Land, Faber and Faber, 1970
  - Approaches to How They Behave, Donut Press, 2009 (extracted from Malcolm Mooney's Land)
- Implements in their Places, Faber and Faber, 1977
- Uncollected Poems, Greville Press, 1990
- Aimed at Nobody: Poems from Notebooks, ed. Margaret Blackwood and Robin Skelton, Faber and Faber, 1993

=== Poetry collections ===
- Collected Poems, 1942–1977, Faber and Faber, 1979
- Selected Poems, Ecco Press, 1980
- Selected Poems, Faber and Faber, 1996
- W.S. Graham Selected by Nessie Dunsmuir, Greville Press, 1998
- New Collected Poems, ed. Matthew Francis, Faber and Faber, 2004
- Les Dialogues obscurs / The Dark Dialogues, selected poems, bilingual book English-French, introduction Michael Snow, afterword Paul Stubbs, Black Herald Press, 2013

=== Anthologies and other writings ===
- Penguin Modern Poets 17, David Gascoyne, W. S. Graham, Kathleen Raine, Penguin Books, 1970
- The Night Fisherman: Selected Letters of W. S. Graham, ed. Michael and Margaret Snow, Carcanet, 1999
- The Caught Habits of Language: An Entertainment for W. S. Graham for Him Having Reached One Hundred, ed. Rachael Boast, Andy Ching, Nathan Hamilton, Donut Press, 2018

== Reviews ==
- Greig, Andrew (1980), review of Collected Poems 1942 - 1977, in Lindsay, Maurice (ed.), The Scottish Review: Arts and Environment 19, August 1980, pp. 58 & 59, ISSN 0140-0894

== See also ==
- Scottish literature
- New Collected Poems, edited by Matthew Francis and with a foreword by Douglas Dunn: Faber and Faber; (2005) ISBN 0-571-20989-0 ISBN 978-0571209897
