= Karen Mac Cormack =

Karen Mac Cormack (born Luanshya, Zambia, 1956) is a contemporary experimental poet. She holds dual British/Canadian citizenship, and lived for many years in Toronto; more recently, she moved to Buffalo, New York, when her husband, the poet Steve McCaffery, was hired by SUNY-Buffalo for the David Gray Chair.

Mac Cormack is the author of Straw Cupid (1987), Quirks & Quillets (1991), Marine Snow (1995), The Tongue Moves Talk (1997), At Issue (2001), Vanity Release (2003) and Implexures (part one, 2003; full-length publication, 2009), as well as a collaboration with the British poet Alan Halsey, Fit to Print (2003). Though she was not directly part of the Language movement, her work shows many affinities with it, in its use of disjunctiveness at a within-sentence and between-sentence level, and in her interest in the interrogation of cultural norms and ideologies through the skeptical reworking of "found" materials and genres. In Fit to Print, for instance, the poems mimic and distort the format and themes of a typical daily newspaper, while in At Issue the poems are quarried from the pages of women's fashion and beauty magazines. The prose pieces in the recent project Implexures are somewhat atypical in their use of biographical and autobiographical materials, especially a series of letters written from a variety of Mediterranean locations by an unnamed female traveller (possibly to be identified with the author, possibly not).
