= Anna Mendelssohn =

British writer and political activist

- Born: Anna Mendleson; 1948
- Died: 15 November 2009 (aged 60–61)
- Education: University of Essex, St Edmund's College, Cambridge
- Occupations: Writer, poet and political activist
- Writing career
- Pen name: Grace Lake

Anna Mendelssohn (born Anna Mendleson, 1948 – 15 November 2009), who wrote under the name Grace Lake, was a British writer, poet and political activist. She came from a left-wing political family, was inspired by the Paris student risings in May 1968, and became a political radical in Britain.

Mendelsohn was convicted of conspiracy to cause explosions as part of The Angry Brigade, a ruling she insisted was unjust. After her release she raised a family, resumed her education and devoted her life to art and to poetry. She grew somewhat isolated from the rest of society, but her friends saw to it that some of her work was published.

== School ==
Mendleson was the daughter of Maurice Mendleson, a market trader from Stockport in Cheshire. According to Peter Riley, writing in The Guardian, her father was from a "working class Jewish" background, fought on the Republican side in the Spanish Civil War, and was a Labour councillor in Stockport; the Mendleson family was later described by Des Wilson as "politically radical". Mendleson was educated at Stockport High School for Girls, where she became Head Girl. She was reported to have been a "brilliant and unruly pupil". In addition Mendleson fostered her artistic ability through attending the New Era Academy of Drama and Music from 1957 to 1967, and performed at several Northern Music Festivals.

== Dropping out of university ==
In September 1967, Mendleson went up to the University of Essex to read English Literature and American History. In May 1968, she went to Paris, to join in the student political rising; what she saw had a great effect on her political thinking. In 1969 she dropped out of her university course rather than continue into her final year, but remained living in Wivenhoe around the university for several months. In early 1970 she was living in York Way in the King's Cross area of London, and was a close friend of a group including some university friends who were living a semi-communal life in Stamford Hill; among them was Hilary Creek. Mendleson and Creek were supporting a group which had squatted empty flats in Arbour Square in Stepney. She became a friend of Jim Greenfield after meeting him on leaving a political meeting.

== Wanted by police ==
On 27 February 1971, Mendleson and Greenfield visited Liverpool to discuss founding a new radical libertarian newspaper; after leaving the meeting they and three others drove to Greenfield's nearby home town of Widnes to go to a pub. The police were called by someone who thought the group looked suspicious and when Greenfield had no documents for their hire car, all five were arrested. Police searches discovered cannabis and a stolen Essex University cheque book; the five gave false names and were bailed to report to Colchester Police Station. The newspaper eventually appeared under the name Strike; for it Mendleson wrote an article on "Judges and the Law". After the arrests the police linked the case to other stolen cheque books and, on 11 June 1971, Mendleson was one of six people to be charged with conspiracy to defraud. However she had jumped bail and her picture was printed in the Police Gazette as a wanted person. People arrested in a police raid in Wivenhoe in April 1971 were shown pictures of Mendleson and asked if they recognised her.

== Amhurst Road ==
Needing a base to produce Strike, the group decided to rent a flat in London. On 2 July 1971, John Barker and Hilary Creek posing as a married couple, and Mendleson using the name 'Nancy Pye', rented the top floor flat at 359 Amhurst Road in Stoke Newington. One of Mendleson's main concerns was that the group should continue to support the defence of Jake Prescott and Ian Purdie, who were charged with carrying out two bombings for The Angry Brigade anarchist group. The duplicating equipment at Amhurst Road was used to produce Angry Brigade Communiqué No. 11 published on 31 July 1971, and Mendleson drafted the Angry Brigade Moonlighter's Cell Communiqué which followed it.

== Police raid ==
With regular police raids on people known to be supportive of the Angry Brigade and with Mendleson a wanted person (although for cheque fraud only), the police were interested in finding any addresses where she might be found. Mendleson was keeping in regular touch with her family in Stockport and a police informer there passed the Amhurst Road address to police on 18 August 1971. An observation was set up and when Jim Greenfield was seen leaving the flat, a search warrant was obtained. At 16:15 on 20 August the police entered the flat and arrested Mendleson, Creek, Barker and Greenfield. Mendleson again gave her name as Nancy Pye. The police reported that their searches of 359 Amhurst Road discovered not only duplicating equipment on which Angry Brigade publications had been produced, but a stick of gelignite, two submachine guns, a Browning pistol and 81 rounds of ammunition. Mendleson was remanded in custody at Holloway Prison and was eventually charged with possession of the armaments and conspiracy to cause explosions. Mendleson's fingerprints were found on a copy of Rolling Stone magazine used to wrap a bomb planted at the Italian consulate in Manchester, and she was also charged with attempting to cause this explosion.

== Stoke Newington Eight trial ==
Mendleson found prison life extremely stressful and at the committal hearing complained that five months in Holloway had caused "isolation and repression, both physical and mental". The resulting trial of eight defendants at the Old Bailey became the longest criminal trial at that point in English legal history, Mendleson was one of three defendants to represent themselves; the "Stoke Newington Eight Defence Group" argued that this was the right decision as they had challenged prosecution witnesses and exposed several as liars. However her health suffered and she was ill throughout much of the trial; on occasion she was too ill to take part at all and the trial had to be halted. She was granted bail during a four-week summer adjournment of the trial, spending the time in Wales.

=== Defence speech ===
The most important part of the trial for Mendleson was her final speech in her own defence, which took a day and a half of court time. She urged the jury to understand her political work and lifestyle, which would help them see why the police should have planted guns and explosives on her. She noted that at the time of the Manchester bombing she had been living in Wivenhoe where doors were left open and people borrowed each other's magazines, and she had been able to produce unchallenged alibi witnesses to the fact that she was in Wivenhoe when the bomb was planted. Although she knew others in the case, she asserted that there was no evidence of any plots or conspiracies. Mendleson said that she understood the feelings behind those who would make bomb attacks on cabinet ministers but doing so "isn't going to get rid of the capitalist system, because there is always somebody to step into his place unless the situation and conditions are right". In conclusion she stressed that those in dock "are working together for a happier and more peaceful world".

Notwithstanding her oratory, Mendleson was convicted by a 10–2 majority of conspiracy to cause explosions. She was also found guilty of the possession charges, but not guilty of attempting to cause an explosion in Manchester. The jury foreman asked for "leniency or clemency" for the defendants, which the judge took into account by reducing the overall sentence by five years. Mendleson was sentenced to ten years' imprisonment. While being taken down to the cells she called out "I would like to say thank you to the two members of the jury who had faith in us". Along with others convicted in the trial, Mendleson appealed against both verdict and sentence, being represented by Michael Mansfield. The appeals failed.

== Parole ==
Mendleson was quietly released on parole in November 1976, just four years after the end of the trial. The news was not disclosed by the Home Office until 13 February 1977, causing a storm of press coverage which one reporter described as "scandalous and distasteful". The issue was raised in Parliament with Home Secretary, Merlyn Rees, saying that Mendleson was no longer a danger to society; William Whitelaw criticised the decision and asserted that protection of the public and police morale came first. Mendleson moved to Cambridge to live with friends as a condition of her parole, and remained a Cambridge resident for the rest of her life. Her father gave an interview to BBC Radio explaining that prison had had a terrible effect on her, making it impossible for her to concentrate. He also said that she had taken no part in the bombings and that she and the other defendants were "good young people" who tried to help others.

== Poetry ==
After her release, she adopted the alternative spelling of her surname Mendelssohn. She spent some time in Sheffield, where she started a family and had three children. Mendelssohn moved to Cambridge in about 1985, studying poetry at St Edmund's College, Cambridge, and devoting her life to poetry and art. She became opposed to technology and disliked judgments based on rationality in favour of those based on an artistic judgment, which led to her life becoming increasingly disconnected from the rest of society.

Such a lifestyle meant she was not greatly interested in seeing her poetry published, but others thought that her work deserved a larger audience. She is said to have had poems published in the Sheffield Free Press. Also, a volume of poetry, due to be published by the Common Ground Printing Co-operative, was reportedly removed prior to publication after the printer sought to censor the content. She was first published in 1986, according to a later reviewer, through "a series of home-made, distributed hand to hand, photographed-manuscript feuilles volantes". In 1988 two of her poems were published under the title La Facciata as issue number 5 of Poetical Histories, with a cover design by the author.

=== Grace Lake ===
Three volumes of her poetry were published by Equipage under the literary pseudonym Grace Lake. Viola Tricolor published in 1993 was followed by Bernache nonnette in 1995; a review of the latter in Angel Exhaust magazine saw it as a critique of left-wing politics since 1970 for seeing the population it hopes to serve as a single group rather than as millions of individual people, a critique which the reviewer Andrew Duncan linked to the poet's own history. 1997 saw the appearance of Tondo Aquatique, which had a theme of the relationship between water and language.

In 2000, a full book of Mendelssohn's poetry was published by Salt Publishing under its Folio imprint and Equipage, this time not using her pseudonym. As with previous publications, it was due to efforts from others, rather than Mendelssohn herself, that Implacable Art was taken up by its publishers; it included some of her line drawings, and some poetry appeared in handwritten form.

== Illness ==
Mendelssohn collapsed in February 2009, and was subsequently diagnosed with an inoperable brain tumour on her cerebellum. As the tumour developed, she became incapacitated by it and dependent on hospital care, being almost unconscious for the last two weeks before her death in November 2009.

== Collections ==
Mendelssohn's personal archive is held at University of Sussex Special Collections, based at The Keep. The collection contains an extensive record of Mendelssohn's work as poet and artist, featuring notebooks, drawing books, art, and draft poems. There is a partial record of Mendelssohn's time in Holloway Prison. The archive was donated to Sussex in 2010 through Mendelssohn's children.

== Works ==
- I'm working here : the collected poems of Anna Mendelssohn, edited by Sara Crangle, Swindon : Shearsman Books, 2020, ISBN 978-1-84861-714-8

== Sources ==
- Carr, Gordon (1975). The Angry Brigade. Victor Gollancz Ltd. ISBN 0-575-01992-1.
