= New British Poetry (2004) =

Poetry anthology

New British Poetry is a 2004 poetry anthology edited by Scots poet Don Paterson and American poet Charles Simic.

In his preface, Simic wrote: "To make it as current as possible, Don Paterson and I decided to include only poets born after 1945 who have had at least two books published. Aside from that constraint, our plan was simply to read a lot of poetry and pick out poems we like."

In a review of the book, Zachariah Wells writes that the editors "favour taste over tact, to exclude work from that school of opaque hermeticism known variously as 'experimental,' 'postmodern' or 'avant-garde' poetry. This is a conscious decision, made explicit by Paterson [...]"

Paterson, in his "passionately opinionated" introduction, has a defense of mainstream poetry:

The work of the Postmoderns delegates the production of meaning to the reader, their poetry being largely derelict in its responsibility to aid it. The reader is alone. For those of us quickly bored by our own company, the result is work that can be objectively described as extremely boring.

== Poets included ==
The volume includes work from 36 poets from England, Scotland, and Wales (not Northern Ireland):

- Gillian Allnutt
- Simon Armitage
- John Ash
- Sujata Bhatt
- John Burnside
- Robert Crawford
- Fred D'Aguiar
- Peter Didsbury
- Michael Donaghy
- Carol Ann Duffy
- Ian Duhig
- Paul Farley
- James Fenton
- Mark Ford
- John Glenday
- Lavinia Greenlaw
- W. N. Herbert
- Selima Hill
- Michael Hofmann
- Kathleen Jamie
- Alan Jenkins
- Jackie Kay
- Gwyneth Lewis
- Roddy Lumsden
- Glyn Maxwell
- Jamie McKendrick
- Andrew Motion
- Sean O'Brien
- Alice Oswald
- Ruth Padel
- Don Paterson
- Peter Reading
- Christopher Reid
- Robin Robertson
- Anne Rouse
- Jo Shapcott

== Other information ==
ISBN 1-55597-394-9 (paperback)

256 pages

== See also ==
- 2004 in poetry
- The New British Poetry a 1988 anthology
