= Vampires on the Silent Screen =

- Author: David Annwn Jones
- Series: Palgrave Gothic
- Genre: Film studies
- Publisher: Palgrave Macmillan
- Publication date: 2023
- ISBN: 978-3-031-38642-8

Vampires on the Silent Screen: Cinema's First Age of Vampires 1897–1922 is a 2023 academic book by David Annwn Jones, published by Palgrave Macmillan.

== Content ==
The book looks at the development of vampire films during the silent era of film history and Jones asserts that vampire cinema has an earlier history than current academia tends to acknowledge. He argues that while most studies of vampire films tend to start with Nosferatu from 1922 the genre actually had an earlier wave during the 1910s that is worth examining from the point of view of the social and mental impact of World War I. He argues that while Nosferatu has already been analysed from this perspective the earlier wave has been neglected so far by researchers. Since many of the earliest vampire films are now lost, Jones utilizes production notes, stills, painted posters, contemporary reviews, and other surviving material to formulate his theory.

== Reception ==
David Budgen of the journal First World War Studies regarded Jones writing as well researched and enjoyable. He also praised the use of "superb images" in the book. Although he criticised several copy-editing errors found in the work. Andrew M. Boylan of the Journal of Vampire Studies compares the book to Gary D. Rhodes's Vampires in Silent Cinema, stating that while Rhodes primarily focuses on American cinema Jones has a more international view.
