= Marshall Blonstein =

American music executive

Marshall Blonstein is an entertainment industry executive. He was the founder and president of the audiophile music labels Audio Fidelity and DCC Compact Classics. He also held positions at labels including Island and Ode.

== Career ==
Blonstein was born and raised in Los Angeles. He entered the music business in 1966, working at Dunhill Records. He subsequently moved into record promotion with ABC Records and from 1966 to 1970 performed similar duties for Columbia Records, working in Chicago and Los Angeles. He ended his tenure with Columbia in 1970 directing promotional activities for the company's Epic and associated labels from New York City.

From 1970 to 1979 Blonstein held executive positions at Ode Records, a label he helped to found with Lou Adler, where he was involved with the success of Carole King’s Tapestry album (1971), the concert edition of The Who’s Tommy (1972), The Rocky Horror Picture Show (1975), and Cheech & Chong’s Up in Smoke movie (1978), among other projects. He served as president of Island Records from 1979 to 1982.

Blonstein began a new phase of his career in 1986 when he founded DCC Compact Classics as one of the first companies to issue catalogue music product on the then-new compact disc format. It catered to the high-end audiophile market with its line of digitally remastered reissues on its 24 Karat Gold CD and 180-gram pure virgin vinyl formats. DCC released audiophile editions of albums by artists including Elvis Presley, Frank Sinatra, Judy Garland, The Beach Boys and the Eagles.

In 2002 Blonstein founded Morada Music and Video, which issued new music and licensed features for DVD, and Audio Fidelity Music, which specializes in audiophile reissues. Among the Audio Fidelity catalogue titles are James Taylor’s Sweet Baby James, Stevie Wonder’s Songs in the Key of Life, Carly Simon’s No Secrets and several Grateful Dead titles. He also added Super Audio Compact Discs (SACD) with titles from Bob Dylan, Phil Collins, Bob Marley and Eric Clapton and others, and created a series of 5.1 Surround Sound audiophile titles, which included albums by George Benson, Earth, Wind & Fire and others. He also established a DVD series Among others, Morada released the historic series Playboy After Dark, and represented the licensing of Soupy Sales television shows. Additionally, the company produced two Elvis Presley documentaries on DVD, Elvis From The Beginning To The End and Elvis, A Generous Heart.

With his partners John Paul DeJoria and Johnathon Kendrick, a line of portable record players was created and marketed as Rock 'N' Rolla for the vinyl market.
