= Alan Baker (poet) =

British poet

Alan Baker (born 1958) is a British poet. He has been the editor of the poetry publisher Leafe Press since 2000, and the online magazine Litter since 2005.

== Life ==
Baker was born in Newcastle upon Tyne, England, in 1958, and in 1985 he moved to Nottingham, where he still lives. In the late 1990s he encountered the email discussion group British-poets, which introduced him to the poets associated with the British Poetry Revival. He founded Leafe Press in 2000, and is now co-editor (with American poet John Bloomberg-Rissman) and is editor of its associated webzine Litter. Leafe Press has published work by Kelvin Corcoran, Carrie Etter, Geraldine Monk, and Lee Harwood, among others, and more recently, work by American, French and Mexican poets, and by the Moroccan Abdellatif Laâbi.

== Poetry ==
Baker published a series of poetry pamphlets between 1999 and 2009; in 2008, Bamboo Books published his translation of Yves Bonnefoy's Début et Fin de la Neige, and in 2011 Skysill Press published Variations on Painting a Room: Poems 2000–2010, which brought together all of Baker's small press work to date, along with a considerable amount of new work. Baker's poetry is regarded as being non-mainstream, or experimental, and is also seen as both lyrical and political. He has an interest in prose-poetry, and his prose sequence The Book of Random Access mixes the apparently personal with borrowed texts, and with references to Eastern philosophies in what has been described as a "post-modern pilgrimage". Baker's poetry and prose poetry "draws on array of modernist and post-modernist techniques". In some of his poetry 'repetition, or near-repetition, are frequently employed in a way that re-enacts the routines of everyday life... half-glimpsed or half-grasped.'.

== Bibliography ==
=== Poetry ===
- Not Bondi Beach (2002, Nottingham, Leafe Press)
- The Strange City (2006, Manchester, Secretariat Books)
- The World Seen from the Air (2007, Nottingham, Skysill Press)
- Hotel February (2009, Riverside CA, Bamboo Books)
- Variations on Painting a Room: Poems 2000–2010 (2011, Nottingham, Skysill Press)
- All This Air and Matter (2013, Hunstanton, Oystercatcher Press)
- Whether (2014, Newton-le-Willows, Knives Forks and Spoons Press)
- Rimas y Ritmos (2017, Facquesol Books)
- Letters from the Underworld (2018, New Mills, Red Ceilings Press)
- Riverrun (2019, Newton-le-Willows, Knives Forks and Spoons Press)
- A Journal of Enlightened Panic (2020, Nottingham, Shoestring Press)
- When Did It AAll Gan Wrang (2022, Nottingham, Open House Editions)
- A Book of Odes (2023, New Mills, Red Ceilings Press)

=== Translations ===
- The Beginning and End of the Snow / Début et fin de la neige by Yves Bonnefoy (2008, Leafe/Bamboo Books)
- Little Things / Les Petites Choses by Abdellatif Laâbi (2013, Leafe Press)

=== Anthologies ===
- The Nottingham Collection (2005, Five Leaves Press)
- Gathered Here Today: a celebration of Geraldine Monk at 60 (2012, Knives, Forks and Spoons Press). ISBN 978-1-907812-95-8
- Twitters for a Lark (Poetry of the European Union of Imaginary Authors), Robert Sheppard (ed.), Shearsman Books. ISBN 978-1-84861-565-6
- The Other Room Anthology 10, Davies, Jenks, Thurston (eds), The Other Room Press. ISSN 2040-3143

== Notes ==
- Gaze, Julia (2012), "Review of 'Variations on Painting a Room'". Assent (University of Derby), Issue 65/1, ISSN 2040-8226.
- Merritt, Matt (2012), "The Page of Now", Under the Radar, Issue 9, February 2012, ISSN 1758-3357.
- Miller, Kate (2012), "Change, Return, Success". Poetry Salzburg Review. No. 22. Autumn 2012. ISSN 1561-5871.
- Riley, Peter (2012), "Poetry Notes: Books Received Summer 2012", Fortnightly Review.
- Seed, Ian (2011), "Space and Play" review of Variations on Painting a Room: Poems 2000–2010, Stride Magazine.
- Spence, Steve (2012), "Playful and Curious", Stride Magazine.
- Swift, Todd (2009), Introduction to poem by Alan Baker, Eyewear.
- Bell, Kathleen (2019), "Under the Radar", issue 23. ISSN 1758-3357.
- Collings, Simon (2019), "Tears in the Fence", Issue 69. ISSN 0266-5816.
