= Catherine Walsh (poet) =

Irish poet

- Born: 1967 (age 58–59); Dublin, Ireland
- Occupation: poet

Catherine Walsh (born 1964) is an Irish poet.

== Biography ==
She was born in Dublin, 1964, and grew up there and in rural Wexford. She is the founder and co-editor of hardPressed Poetry with Billy Mills. She lives in Limerick. She served as Holloway Lecturer on the Practice of Poetry at University of California, Berkeley for 2012/13.

== Publications ==
- Macula (Dublin, Red Wheelbarrow Press, 1986)
- The Ca Pater Pillar Thing and More Besides (Dublin, hardPressed Poetry, 1986)
- Making Tents (hardPressed Poetry, 1987)
- Short Stories (UK, Twickenham and Wakefield, North & South, 1989)
- from Pitch (London, Form Books, 1993)
- Pitch (Durham, UK, Pig press, 1994)
- Idir Eatortha & Making Tents (London, Invisible Books, 1997)
- Etruscan Books Reader No 1 ( Devon, Etruscan Books, 1997)
- from City West (Vermont, Longhouse, 1997)
- City West (Exeter, UK, Shearsman Books, Ltd, 2005)
- Optic Verve (Exeter, UK, Shearsman Books, Ltd, 2009)
- Astonished Birds Cara, Jane, Bob and James (hardPressed Poetry, 2012)
