= Anne Blonstein =

British poet and translator (1958–2011)

Anne D. Blonstein (22 April 1958 – 19 April 2011) was a British poet and translator, long-resident in Basel, Switzerland, where she worked as a freelance translator and editor.

She was the author of six full-length collections, the blue pearl, worked on screen, memory's morning, the butterflies and the burnings, correspondence with nobody, and to be continued. She was also known for her poetic sequences that work with notarikon – originally a rabbinic and Kabbalistic method used to interpret the Hebrew Scriptures. She redeployed and elaborated it as a contemporary poetic procedure, engaging with diverse languages and texts, both ancient and modern.

== Early life ==
The great-granddaughter of Jewish immigrants to Britain at the turn of the 20th century, Anne Blonstein was born and raised in the Home Counties – first Harpenden, Hertfordshire, then moving with her family to Surrey when she was 11. Before leaving Britain in 1983, she spent six years in Cambridge, where she took a degree in Natural Sciences followed by a PhD in genetics and plant breeding.

== Career ==
Blonstein lived in Basel, Switzerland, where she earned a living as a freelance translator and editor.

"[Blonstein's] terse, unusual images are the outcome of an English language that, mated to the other idioms she lives with – German, French, and Hebrew – shapes the transnational world of a language nomad. … In her most recent work, Hebrew … has become the place to which she ties her English and the other languages she uses in her life through graphic/visual and semantic associations. … [F]or Blonstein languages, with their varieties and differences, have become the endangered species of our globalized world." – Marina Camboni, Contemporary Women's Writing, Oxford University Press

Blonstein also collaborated on projects with other artists, including the ceramist Pat King, and the Swiss composers Mela Meierhans and Margrit Schenker. Her works appeared in Denver Quarterly, Descant, Dusie, How2, Indiana Review and the Notre Dame Review.

== Death ==
Anne Blonstein died in 2011, after a long, undisclosed illness, aged 52.

== Publications ==
- sand.soda.lime, Broken Boulder Press, 2002
- the blue pearl, Salt Publishing, 2003, ISBN 978-1-876857-65-3
- worked on screen, Poetry Salzburg, 2005, ISBN 978-3-901993-18-3
- from eternity to personal pronoun, Gribble Press, 2005
- that those lips had language, Plan B Press, 2005, ISBN 978-0-9728312-5-3
- thou shalt not kill, Dusie Wee Chap, 2007
- hairpin loop: poems, Bright Hill Press, 2007, ISBN 978-1-892471-44-4
- memory's morning, Shearsman Books, 2008, ISBN 978-1-905700-76-9
- correspondence with nobody, Ellectrique Press, 2008, ISBN 978-3-033-01685-9
- the butterflies and the burnings, Dusie Press, 2009, ISBN 978-0-615-18579-8
