= Rosa Leveroni =

Catalan poet and narrator

Rosa Leveroni i Valls (1910–1985) was a Catalan poet and narrator. Born in Barcelona, she was influenced by the poet Carles Riba. Her work is published in Poesia (1981) and Contes (1981). She also wrote essays and literary criticism. She spent time revitalising Catalan language and culture in the post World War II years. She was awarded the Creu de Sant Jordi in 1982. She was one of the first members of the Associació d'Escriptors en Llengua Catalana. She died in Cadaqués in 1985.

== Works ==
=== Poetry ===
- Epigrames i cançons (1938)
- Presència i record (1952)
- Poesia (1981)

=== Essays and literary criticism ===
- Les imatges marines en la poesia d'Ausiàs March (1951)
- Maria Novell, recordada (1969)
- Un epistolari de Carles Riba (1940-42)

=== Short texts ===
- Contes (1986)
- L'estranger, L'Horta, Retorn (in several anthologies)
- Un home de lletres i altres contes (Horsori Editorial, Barcelona, 2011)
