= Poetry Salzburg Review =

Poetry Salzburg Review is an English language, biannual literary magazine published by Poetry Salzburg at the University of Salzburg and edited by Wolfgang Görtschacher. It is a successor to The Poet's Voice, which was edited and published in Austria by British poet Fred Beake, James Hogg and Görtschacher. Since its creation in 2001, the journal aims to present a diverse range of contemporary poetry along with translations into English, interviews with poets and translators, poetry book reviews and essays on poetry. As of 2023 the editorial board consists of John Challis, Hilary Davies, Lisa Fishman, Martin Malone, and Lisa Samuels.

It includes international English language poets from beyond the English language world: writers from Austria, Bosnia, Switzerland, Croatia, Greece, Pakistan, Hungary, Germany, Singapore, Finland, Poland, Serbia, Ukraine, and Italy, among others. The Poetry Salzburg press imprint publishes poetry books and collections in English.

== Among past contributors ==
- Ally Acker
- Louis Armand
- Rae Armantrout
- Anne Blonstein
- Vahni Capildeo
- Robert Dassanowsky
- Ingrid de Kok
- Raymond Federman
- Kate Fox
- Paul Green
- Robert Hampson
- Michael Heller
- Fanny Howe
- Helen Ivory
- Abhay K
- Mimi Khalvati
- Katerina Neocleous
- James Kirkup
- Edward Lowbury
- Chantal Maillard
- Paula Meehan
- Samuel Menashe
- David Miller
- Andrea Moorhead
- Paul Muldoon
- Henrik Nordbrandt
- Alice Notley
- Naomi Shihab Nye
- Bernard O'Donoghue
- Maggie O'Sullivan
- Andrew Loog Oldham
- Marjorie Perloff
- Simon Perchik
- Pascale Petit
- Jerome Rothenberg
- Susanna Roxman
- Nicholas Samaras
- Sean Street
- Toon Tellegen
- Keith Waldrop
- Rosmarie Waldrop
- Liliane Wouters
- Alessio Zanelli

== See also ==
- List of magazines in Austria
