= Gary D. Rhodes =

American writer and filmmaker (born 1972)

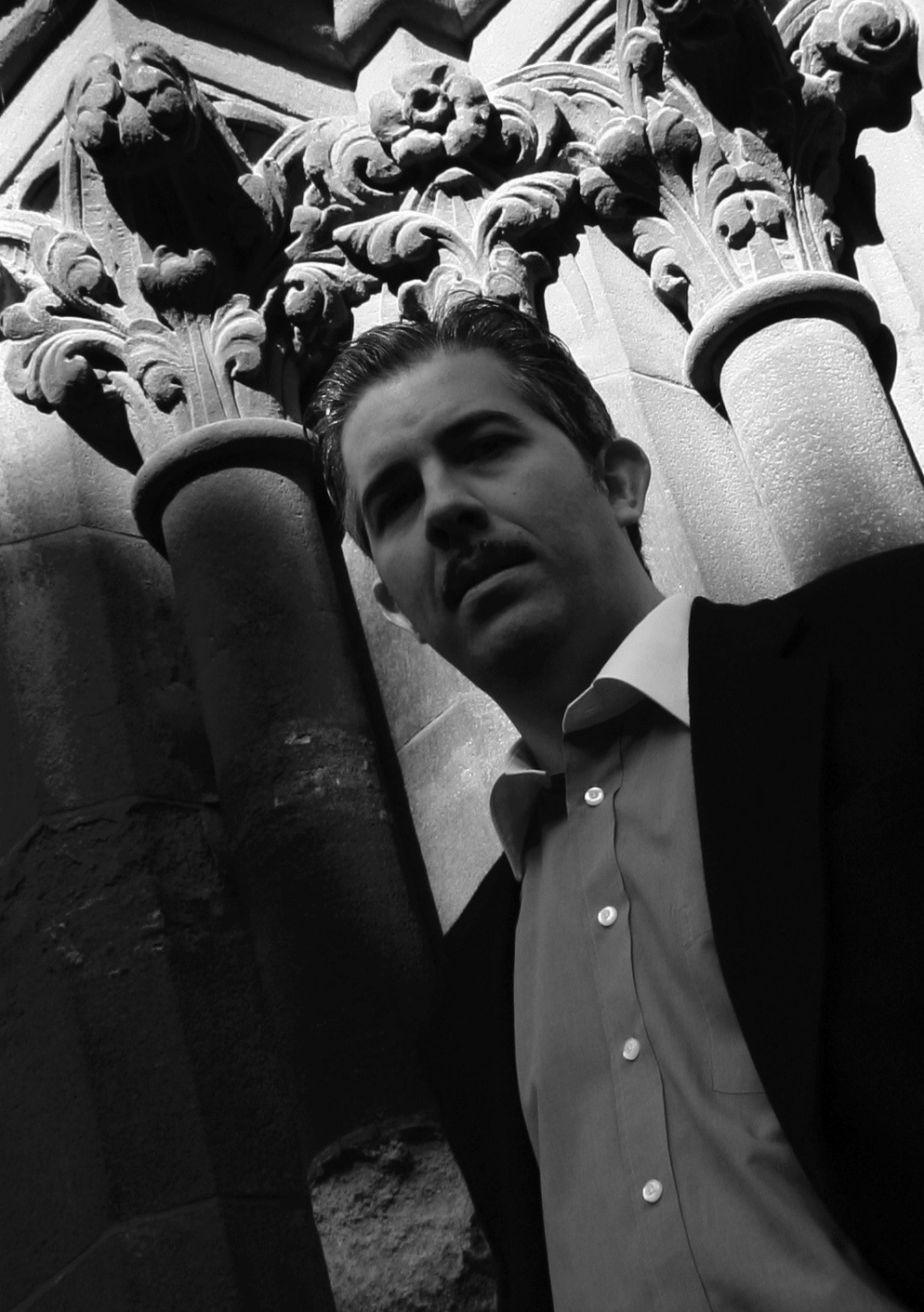
- Author Gary D. Rhodes
- Born: Gary Don Rhodes; September 11, 1972 (age 54); Ardmore, Oklahoma, U.S.
- Occupations: Writer, filmmaker, film historian, author

Gary Don Rhodes (born 1972) is an American writer, filmmaker, and film historian. His work encompasses research on early 20th-century films and key figures, including the filmmakers and actors involved. Rhodes is notably recognized for his contribution to classic horror films and his biographical works on the actor Bela Lugosi. In addition to his academic pursuits, he has also created documentaries and mockumentaries. Rhodes holds a tenured faculty position in film studies at Queen's University Belfast.

== Early life ==
Born in Ardmore, Oklahoma on September 11, 1972, Rhodes is a member of the Cherokee tribe.

== Career ==
=== Research ===
Rhodes’ primary research interests include American film exhibition, film genre, early cinema, and documentary filmmaking.

Rhodes has contributed to the field of film studies with several publications, including The Perils of Moviegoing in America, 1896-1950 (Bloomsbury/Continuum, 2011) and Emerald Illusions: The Irish in Early American Cinema (Irish Academic Press, 2011).

Rhodes has edited scholarly anthologies such as Horror at the Drive-In: Essays in Popular Americana (McFarland, 2003), and Docufictions: Essays on the Intersection of Documentary and Fictional Filmmaking (McFarland, 2005, with John Parris Springer), the first anthology on the subject of the mockumentary genre.

=== Horror movies ===
Rhodes' study of horror cinema primarily focuses on the life and legacy of actor Bela Lugosi. According to Starbust magazine, "Scholar Gary D. Rhodes has spent his career debunking myths about classic horror cinema in general and Bela Lugosi’s life and work in particular."

In a book review for Fangoria, author David-Elijah Nahmod suggested that Rhodes “may be primarily responsible for the cult of Lugosi that exists today.”

=== Editor ===
As of 2014, Rhodes became series editor (with Robert Singer) of the ReFocus series of books on neglected American film directors, published by Edinburgh University Press. He also sits on the editorial board of the peer-reviewed journal Horror Studies.

=== The Queen's University ===
At Queen's University, Rhodes has served as director of film studies, co-director of film studies, and MA convenor.

In 2015, The Guardian named film studies at Queen's as one of the top 10 film programs in the United Kingdom.

=== Other works ===
In addition to his other work, Rhodes publishes fiction and poetry under pseudonyms and occasionally under his own name. He has also booked jazz concerts in Oklahoma.

== Films ==
=== Documentaries ===
Rhodes’ early documentary films concentrated on the subject of jazz music. His first film was Solo Flight: The Genius of Charlie Christian (1992). Directed by Rhodes when he was 18, the film received positive reviews in such publications as The Christian Science Monitor, Booklist, Cadence, and The L.A. Jazz Scene. The making of the film revealed the location of Christian’s hitherto-unknown and unmarked burial spot, and raised funds for a historical marker to be placed upon the site.

Rhodes’ film, Fiddlin’ Man: The Life and Times of Bob Wills (1993), became a successful fundraiser for a number of PBS stations.

Rhodes’ other documentaries focus on the subject of film history, such as Lugosi: Hollywood's Dracula (1999), which was a finalist at the 2000 Hollywood Film Festival.

His film Banned in Oklahoma (2005) chronicled a five-year legal battle over the banning of Volker Schlöndorff’s The Tin Drum in Oklahoma. In 2005, the Criterion Collection released Banned in Oklahoma on DVD with The Tin Drum (1979). The documentary shared the award for best film at the 2004 DeadCenter Film Festival in Oklahoma.

=== Mockumentaries ===
Rhodes also directed the mockumentary film Chair (2000) and the fictional feature Wit's End (2005), starring Rue McClanahan, Darryl Cox, Udo Kier, and William Sanderson.

== Works ==
=== Essays ===
- “Irish-American Film Audiences, 1915-1930.” Post Script, Summer 2013: 70-96
- “The Film Company of Ireland and the Irish-American Press.” Screening the Past No. 133, 2012
- “Early Cinema and Oklahoma.” The Chronicles of Oklahoma, Winter 2011-12: 388-429
- “Reinventing a New Wheel: The Films of Norman Mailer.” The Mailer Review, Fall 2011: 170-182
- “The Double Feature Evil: Efforts to Eliminate the American Dual Bill.” Film History: An International Journal Vol. 23, No. 1, 2011: 57-7
- “Drakula halála (1921): The Cinema’s First Dracula.” Horror Studies, Vol. 1, No. 1, 2010: 25-47
- “The Origin, Development, and Controversy of the US Moving Picture Poster to 1915.” Film History: An International Journal, Vol. 19, No. 3, 2007: 228-246
- "Mockumentaries and the Production of Realist Horror." Post Script, Fall 2002: 46-60

=== Non-fiction ===
- Lugosi (1996) - ISBN 978-0786402571
- White Zombie: Anatomy of a Horror Film (2001) - ISBN 9781476604916
- Bela Lugosi - Dreams and Nightmares (2006) with co-author Richard Sheffield - ISBN 9780977379811
- The Perils of Moviegoing in America (2011) - ISBN 9781441136107
- Emerald Illusions: The Irish in Early American Cinema (2012) - ISBN 9780716531432
- No Traveler Returns: The Lost Years of Bela Lugosi (2012) with co-author Bill Kaffenberger - ISBN 9781593932855
- Tod Browning's Dracula (2015) - ISBN 9780956683458
- Bela Lugosi in Person (2015) with co-author Bill Kaffenberger - ISBN 9781593938055
- Ed Wood's Bride of the Monster (2015) with co-author Tom Weaver - ISBN 9781593938574
- Ed Wood and the Lost Lugosi Screenplays (2016) with co-author Tom Weaver - ISBN 9781593939205
- Vampires in Silent Cinema (2024)

=== Anthologies (As Editor) ===
- Horror at the Drive-In: Essays in Popular Americana (2003) - ISBN 9780786437627
- Docufictions: Essays on the Intersection of Documentary and Fictional Filmmaking (2006) with John Parris Springer - ISBN 9780786421848
- Stanley Kubrick: Essays on His Films and Legacy (2008) - ISBN 9780786432974
- Edgar G. Ulmer: Detour on Poverty Row (2009) - ISBN 9780739125687
- The Films of Joseph H. Lewis (2012) - ISBN 9780814334621
