= Wendy Mulford =

British poet (born 1941)

Wendy Mulford (born 1941) is a Welsh-born poet, associated with the contemporary avant garde scene, with the British Poetry Revival, and with the development of feminist poetry in the 1970s. Her poetry has been viewed as "difficult to categorise" and as "multi- and non-linear". Her early poetry had particularly strong feminist and Marxist elements, but latterly she has moved towards more personal themes.

Mulford's prose works include a combined biography of Sylvia Townsend Warner and Valentine Ackland, a book about female saints, and essays about poetry.

== Writing and teaching ==
She wrote a biography of Sylvia Townsend Warner and Valentine Ackland (besides providing an introduction to a 1989 reprint of Townsend Warner's 1938 novel After The Death of Don Juan) and co-wrote with Sara Maitland a book on the subject of female saints. Mulford also has used her experience teaching in Cambridge to write a number of critical essays about poetry, saying that women poets are still "too tied to the familiar".

== Publishing ==
Mulford also has been active in the publishing business, founding Street Editions in 1972 and running the company until it was merged with Ken Edwards' Reality Studios to form Reality Street Editions in 1993. During this period, Street Editions published such poets as John James, Sarah Kirsch, Tom Raworth, John Wilkinson, Stephen Rodefer and Rod Mengham, and was at its peak regarded as a leading outlet for experimental literature that could not be published by mainstream presses. Mulford left the company in 1998, but her 2009 poetry collection The Land Between was published by the company.

== Personal life ==
Mulford grew up in Wales but moved to Cambridge University in the 1960s to study English. She remained at Cambridge throughout the 1970s before moving to Thames Polytechnic in the early 1980s and then returning to Cambridge. In the 1990s and 2000s she lived in Norfolk and Suffolk, which inspired her 1998 collection The East Anglia Sequence.

She married fellow poet John James in the 1970s and they have one daughter. More recently, her partner was the composer Gordon Crosse, with whom she bought a cottage on Papa Westray, the northern-most of the Orkney Islands. Crosse made a choral setting of her poem song for a cold easter in 2021. Since 2007, Mulford has been training herself to be a Jungian analyst.

== Works ==
=== Poetry ===
- In the Big Red Chair (1975)
- Bravo to Girls & Heroes (1977)
- No Fee (with Denise Riley; 1979)
- Reactions to Sunsets (1980)
- The Light Sleepers (1980)
- Some Poems 1968-1978 (with Denise Riley; 1982)
- The A. B. C. of Writing and Other Poems (1985)
- Late Spring Next Year: Poems 1979-1985 (1987)
- The Bay of Naples (1992)
- The East Anglia Sequence: Norfolk 1984 – Suffolk 1994 (1998)
- A Handful Of Morning: Poems 1993-1997 (1999)
- and suddenly, supposing: Selected Poems (2002)
- The Land Between (2009)

=== Non-fiction ===
- This Narrow Place: Sylvia Townsend Warner and Valentine Ackland 1930-1951 (1988)
- Virtuous Magic: Women Saints and Their Meanings (with Sara Maitland; 1998)

=== As editor ===
- The Virago Book of Love Poetry (with Helen Kidd, Julia Mishkin and Sandi Russell; 1991)

=== As translator ===
- The Brontes' Hats, by Sarah Kirsch (1991)
- T by Sarah Kirsch (1995)
