= David Miller (poet) =

Australian poet David Miller

- Born: 1950 (age 75–76); Melbourne, Victoria
- Occupation: Poet
- Writing career
- Language: English
- Years active: 1973-

David Miller (born 1950) is a writer, poet, literary critic, and editor. Born in Melbourne, Australia, he has lived in London since 1972.

Miller has published over fifty books and pamphlets. His first books were The Caryatids (Enitharmon Press) and South London Mix (Gaberbocchus Press), both published in 1975. His subsequent works include The Story (Arc Publications, 1976), Unity (Singing Horse Press, 1981), Pictures of Mercy (Stride, 1991), Stromata (Burning Deck Press, 1995), Collected Poems (University of Salzburg Press, 1997), Art and Disclosure (Stride, 1998), Spiritual Letters (1–12) (hawkhaven press, 1999) and The Waters of Marah (Singing Horse 2003, Shearsman 2005).

His writing has been celebrated in At the Heart of Things: the poetry and prose of David Miller (Stride 1994). Other discussions of his writing can be found in an essay by Robert Hampson in New British Poetries: The Scope of the Possible, ed. R. Hampson and Peter Barry (Manchester University Press, 1993), Michael Thorp's Breaking at the Fountain: A Meditation on the Work of David Miller (Stride, 1998), and Tim Woods's long essay, '"Thought itself, ruptured": The Spiritual Materialist Poetics of David Miller', The Poet's Voice, New Series, Vol. 4(2), 1998.

He is an associate editor for Poetry Salzburg Review.

== Bibliography ==
=== Poetry collections ===
- The Caryatids : Poems 1971-73 (1975)
- All My Life : Poems 1973/74 (1975)
- The Story (1976)
- Appearance and Event : Sixteen Poems : 1976 (1977)
- Unity (1981)
- Losing to Compassion : Six Poems, 1978-84 (1985)
- Pictures of Mercy : Selected Poems (1991)
- Stromata (1995)
- Collected Poems (1997)
- Reassembling Still - Collected Poems (2014)

=== Other ===
- Darkness Enfolding : Eight Stories, 1978-87 (1989) – short stories
- The Waters of Marah : Selected Prose 1973-1995 (2003) – prose
