= Chris Torrance =

British poet (1941–2021)

Chris Torrance (1941 – 21 August 2021) was a poet associated with the British Poetry Revival of the 1960s, mainly known for long poetry cycle The Magic Door published as a series of volumes over 30 years.

== Biography ==
Born in Edinburgh in 1941, Torrance grew up in London and moved to Pontneddfechan, Wales in 1970. He taught an extramural creative writing course at University College Cardiff for 25 years. He performed literary cabaret with the poetry and music group Poetheat, which he co-founded in 1985 with composer Chris Vine, later called Heat Poets.

His work shows the influence of the Beats, especially Gary Snyder and William Burroughs and an interest in the matter and monuments of ancient Britain, including such 'magical' or religious phenomena as ley lines. He also expressed an admiration for the writings of Charles Olson and David Jones. He is one of the poets discussed in William Rowe's Three Lyric Poets (Northcote House, 2009).

Torrance has featured in a number of key Revival magazines including Poetmeat and the anthologies Children of Albion: Poetry of the Underground in Britain (1969), Conductors of Chaos (1996) and Other: British and Irish Poetry since 1970 (1999).

His major work was the ongoing Magic Door sequence, of which eight books have been published to date by various publishers. The ninth volume, Path was prepared for publication in 2008 but was not released. In 2017 Torrance noted that there were a further three volumes in the pipeline. A collected edition of the first eight books was published in 2017 as The Magic Door by Test Centre with an introduction by Phil Maillard. The sequence follows his life at Glyn y Mercher Isaf, recording his practical activities, his love life, and his engagement with nature, mythology, geology and history. He develops the concept of a landscape filled with powers - ley lines and standing stones, pagan gods and spirits, and focuses on the nearby standing stones of Maen Madoc and Maen Llia and the 19th century house of Glan yr Afon which incorporates geological oddities and an elaborate stone archway. Torrance died on 21 August 2021 at the age of 80. The Glasfryn Project plans to publish some of his work posthumously.

The Magic Door sequence based on the collected edition
Sequence	Title	Initial published numbering	Date of first publication
1	Acrospirical Meanderings In a Tongue of the Time	none	1973
2	The Magic Door	Book I	1975
3	Citrinas	Book II	1977
4	The Diary of Palug's Cat	Book III	1980
5	The Book of Brychan	Book IV	1982
6	Cylinder Fragments of the Twentieth Century	none	1982
7	The Slim Book / Wet Pulp	Book V	1986
8	Southerly Vector	Book VI	1996
9	Path	Book VII	Aquifer Press 2026
10	not known		(not yet published)
11	not known		(not yet published)

== Selected publications ==
=== The Magic Door sequence ===
- Torrance, Chris; Torrance, Val (1973) Acrospirical Meanderings in a Tongue of the Time, London, Albion Village Press
- Torrance, Chris; Torrance, Val (1975), The magic door : a cycle. Book 1, London, Albion Village Press, OCLC 60053688
- Citrinas (The Magic Door, Book II) (1977), London, Albion Village Press
- The diary of Palug's Cat (The Magic Door, Book III) (1980), Newcastle upon Tyne, Galloping Dog Press', ISBN 0-904837-24-6; also Swansea, Stone Lantern Audiobook on tape oclc=20672978
- The Book of Brychan (The Magic Door, Book IV) (1982), Newcastle upon Tyne, Galloping Dog Press; illustrations and cover design by Robin Campbell
- Cylinder Fragments of the Twentieth Century (1982), Neath, Cwm Nedd Press, ISBN 978-0-906244-12-8
- The Slim Book/Wet Pulp (The Magic Door, Book V) (1986), Swansea, Stone Lantern Press
- Southerly Vector/The Book Of Heat – Further Books of the Magic Door (1996), Neath, Cwm Nedd Press, ISBN 0-906244-27-7
- Path (The Magic Door, Book 7) (prepared by Heaventree Press, 2008, published Aquifer 2026)
- The Magic Door (Test Centre, 2017) ISBN 978-0-9935693-4-0

=== Other poetry ===
- Torrance, Chris (1968), Green orange purple red, and other poems, London, Ferry Press; cover drawing by David Jenkins, ISBN 978-0-900851-01-8, OCLC 30296691
- Torrance, Chris (1969), Aries under Saturn and beyond, London, Ferry Press, ISBN 978-0-900851-22-3, OCLC 96469
- Torrance, Chris (1975), Mirages : a chronicle – September 1975, Neath Abbey, OCLC 12336536
- Torrance, Chris; Torrance, Val (1976), The Florentine sonnets, Neath, Cwm Nedd Press, OCLC 15127215
- The Rainbringer (1977), Newcastle upon Tyne, Pig Press; 2nd revised edition, 1978. ISBN 0-903997-38-X
- Heat Sonnets (1979), Newcastle upon Tyne, Pig Press. ISBN 0-903977-42-7
- The Cloud Book, Neath, Cwm Nedd Press, 1980, OCLC 9107523
- Torrance, Chris; Clark, Thomas A.; MacSweeney, Barry (1993), The Tempers of Hazard, London, Paladin
- The Book of Heat CD, Chris Torrance-Words, Chris Vine-Music (1998), Innerstar; rerelease 2003
- Wobbly Chair (2003), Dinas Powys, Canna Press
- Frinite CD, Chris Torrance-Words, Chris Vine-Music (2004) Dinas Powys, Canna Press
- Hare Pie, card designed by Deidre Farrell (2007), signed by artist and author, Dinas Powys, Canna Press
- Chris Torrance and Chris Vine Rory: A book of the boundaries
- Thirty poems in Graham Harthill, Phil Maillard and Chris Torrance Slipping the Leash (2015), Llangattock (Powys), Aquifer Books

=== Critical works ===
"Death of the poem?", A470: what's on in literary Wales, No. 26 (Nov.-Dec. 2003), p. 6.
