= Andrew Duncan (poet) =

British poet, critic, and editor

Andrew Duncan (born 1956) is a British poet, critic, and editor. The author of at least seven books of poetry, including Anxiety Before Entering a Room Selected Poems 1977–99 (Salt Publishing, 2001). His work as a literary and cultural critic is most recently on display in The Failure of Conservatism in Modern British Poetry (Salt Publishing, 2003).

Andrew Duncan studied as a mediaevalist and started his writing career in punk "fanzines". He has been publishing poetry since the late 1970s, serving as the editor of the magazine Angel Exhaust. Duncan worked as a labourer (in England and Germany) after leaving school, and subsequently as a project planner with a telecomms manufacturer (1978–87), and as a programmer for the Stock Exchange (1988–91).

He also publishes a website called pinko.org in which he aims to "verbalize knowledge which a lot of people on the [underground poetry] scene share – not really to uncover completely new information".
