= Maurice Scully =

Irish poet (1952–2023)

- Born: 1952; Dublin, Ireland
- Died: 5 March 2023 (aged 70–71); Bolea, Spain
- Education: Trinity College Dublin
- Occupations: Poet, teacher

Maurice Scully (1952 – 5 March 2023) was an Irish poet who worked in the modernist tradition. Scully was born in Dublin and educated at Trinity College. He was a member of Aosdana.

== Life ==
After some years living in Italy, Africa and the west of Ireland, he settled with his wife and four children in Dublin.

Scully died in Bolea, Spain on 5 March 2023.

== The Beau ==
The Beau was an annual literary journal edited by Scully. It ran to three issues: 1981, 1982/83 and 1983/84. Although the journal was short-lived, its contributor list, featuring writers from Ireland, Britain and the United States, was impressive and it played an important role in the emergence of a number of experimental Irish poets. It also carried reproductions by a number of Irish artists.

Contributors included Roy Fisher, Knute Skinner, William Oxley, Randolph Healy, Brian Coffey, David Wright, Paul Durcan, John Freeman, John Jordan, Anthony Cronin, Gavin Ewart, Eoghan Ó Tuairisc, George Barker, Dermot Bolger Billy Mills and Jim Burns.

The featured painters were Michael Mulcahy, Patrick Hall, Alice Hanratty and Patrick Pye.

== Published works ==
- Love Poems & Others (1981)
- 5 Freedoms of Movement (1987 & 2000)
- Steps (1998)
- Livelihood (2004)
- Sonata, (2006)
- Tig (2006)
- Doing the Same in English (2008)
- Humming (2009)
- A Tour of the Lattice (2011)
- Rain (2013)
- Several Dances (2014)
- Game On [with Jordi Valls Pozo] (2019)
- Play Book (2019)
- Things That Happen (2020)
- A book of essays on Scully's poetry A Line of Tiny Zeros in the Fabric [Ed Kenneth Keating] appeared in 2020
