= Alan Halsey =

British poet (1949–2022)

- Born: 22 September 1949; Croydon, Surrey, UK
- Died: October 2022 (aged 73)
- Writing career
- Genre: poetry

Alan Halsey (22 September 1949 – October 2022) was a British poet. He managed The Poetry Bookshop in Hay-on-Wye from 1979 to 1997. From 1997, Halsey lived in Sheffield, working as a specialist bookseller and publishing West House Books.

Halsey was born in Croydon, Surrey, on 22 September 1949. He founded West House Books in 1994 to publish contemporary poetry and poetry-related work. In later years, he managed it in partnership with his wife, the British poet Geraldine Monk. His death was announced by his publisher, Shearsman Books, in October 2022.

== Career ==
Alan Halsey's collection of poems include Five Years Out (1989), Wittgenstein's Devil (2000), Marginalien (2005) and Not Everything Remotely (2006). In addition, his prose works include The Text of Shelley's Death (1995) and A Robin Hood Book (1996). Among his collaborative works are Fit to Print with Karen Mac Cormack (1998), Days of '49 with Gavin Selerie (1999) and Quaoar with Ralph Hawkins and Kelvin Corcoran (2006). He was the author of several essays on Thomas Lovell Beddoes and the editor of the later version of Beddoes' Death's Jest-Book (2003). His graphics have been widely published and he was the illustrator of several books including Kelvin Corcoran's Your Thinking Tracts or Nations (2001) and Gavin Selerie's Le Fanu's Ghost (2006). Halsey's text-graphic work Memory Screen was shown at the Bury Text Festival in 2005.

== Bibliography ==
- Yearspace (Galloping Dog 1979)
- Present State (Spectacular Diseases 1981)
- Perspectives on the Reach (Galloping Dog 1981)
- Auto Dada Cafe (Five Seasons 1987)
- Five Years Out (Galloping Dog 1989)
- Reasonable Distance (Equipage 1992)
- Spells Against Green Field Development (West House Books 1994)
- The Text of Shelley's Death (Five Seasons 1995; West House 2001)
- A Robin Hood Book (West House 1996)
- Wittgenstein's Devil: Selected Writing 1978–1998 (Stride 2000; 2nd edn 2002)
- Sonatas & Preliminary Sketches (Oasis 2000)
- Dante’s Barber Shop (West House 2001)
- In Addition: Seventeen Lives of the Poets (La Perruque 2004)
- Marginalien (Five Seasons 2005)
- A Looking-Glass for Logoclasts (Free Poetry 2005)
- Not Everything Remotely: Selected Poems 1978–2005 (Salt 2006)
