= John James (British poet) =

British poet (1939–2018)

- Born: 14 March 1939; Cardiff, Wales
- Died: 14 May 2018 (aged 79)
- Education: Saint Illtyd's College
- Alma mater: University of Bristol; University of Keele
- Writing career
- Genre: Poetry

John James (14 March 1939 – 14 May 2018) was a British poet.

== Life and work ==
John James was born in 1939 in Cardiff to Lil (née O'Reilly) and Charlie James, a royal marine. He was educated by Lasalle Brothers at Saint Illtyd's College. He left the college in 1957 to read Philosophy and English Literature at the University of Bristol and later undertook postgraduate studies in American Literature at the University of Keele. He was a founder with Nick Wayte of the poetry journal The Resuscitator in Bristol in 1963 and an active contributor to the worksheet, The English Intelligencer. He became Arts Council Creative Writing Fellow, at the University of Sussex, 1978– and was the former Head of Communication Studies at Anglia Ruskin University, Cambridge.

After serving as a bouncer, James got a job with Somerset water board, during which time his poems began to emerge. While still at the University of Bristol, James met and married his first wife, Ann Dorman, in 1961. With their children, the James family moved to Cambridge where from 1966 John was a teacher at the Cambridgeshire College of Arts and Technology. During this times, he also was a frequent visitor at Panton Arms pub where he used to write most of his poems. Some of his poems were dedicated to his friends and family, including Barry Flanagan and Richard Long. He also collaborated with Tom Phillips on his project In One Side & Out the Other in 1970 as well as Bruce McLean whose linocuts he decorated with his poems in 2016, during which time his Sarments: New and Selected Poems came out.

After a divorce, James married the poet Wendy Mulford in the 1970s, with whom he had a daughter. Later he would live with Patricia Coyle who was a senior lecturer in media studies at Anglia Ruskin University where James was an educator on literature and film. His translation of The Prince of Homburg was developed into a stage production in 1982 for Cottesloe Theatre. Prior to his death, James became also known as a communist and trade unionist.

James died on 14 May 2018, aged 79.

== Bibliography ==
- mmm … ah yes (1967)
- The Welsh Poems (1967)
- Trägheit (1968)
- The Small Henderson Room (1969)
- In One Side & Out the Other (1970), with Andrew Crozier and Tom Phillips
- Letters from Sarah (1973)
- Striking the Pavilion of Zero (1975)
- A Theory of Poetry (1977)
- War (1978)
- A Former Boiling (1979)
- Toasting (1979)
- Inaugural Address (1979)
- Berlin Return (1983)
- Poem for Bruce McLean (1983)
- Lines for Richard Long (1988)
- The Ghost of Jimi Hendrix at Stokesay Castle (1988)
- Local (1990)
- Dreaming Flesh (1991)
- Kinderlieder (1992)
- Schlegel Eats a Bagel 1996
- Collected Poems, Cambridge, UK: Salt, 2002
- In Romsey Town, Cambridge, UK: Equipage, 2011
- Cloud Breaking Sun (2014)
- Sabots (2015)
- Sarments: New and Selected Poems (2018)
