= Randolph Healy =

Irish poet and publisher (born 1956)

Randolph Healy (born 1956) is an Irish poet and publisher.

Healy was born in Scotland and moved to Dublin at the age of 18 months. After leaving school at the age of 14 to work in a number of jobs, he returned to full-time education and graduated in Mathematical Sciences from Trinity College, Dublin. He now works as a teacher of mathematics at the second level. His poetry is marked by the frequent use of structural devices derived from logic and scientific diction.

He has written work on the issues of the politics of language. He takes sign language and deafness as his points of departure in addressing it.

His books include 25 Poems (1983), Rana Rana! (1997), Arbor Vitae (1997), Flame (1998) and Selected Poems (2000). He runs the publishing house, Wild Honey Press.

His work has been widely discussed, including this essay by Marthine Satris in the Irish University Review Codex Vitae: The Material Poetics of Randolph Healy's ‘Arbor Vitae’ and "anxious fuchsia ocean": The Accomplishment of Randolph Healy, by Peter Riley and published in the Chicago Review.
