= Robert Sheppard (poet) =

British poet and critic

Robert Sheppard (born 14 November 1955) is a British poet and critic. He is at the forefront of the movement sometimes called "linguistically innovative poetry."

== Life ==
Robert Sheppard was born in 1955 and was educated at the University of East Anglia (BA; MA; PhD). In 1996 he moved from London to Liverpool to teach at Edge Hill University as Professor of Poetry and Poetics and Programme Leader of the MA in Creative Writing. In 1996, Sheppard became Emeritus Professor at Edge Hill.

== Poetry and Criticism ==
Sheppard's magnum opus is his long-running work "Twentieth Century Blues". This was composed over many years, and published piece-meal before Salt Publishing brought out the complete work in 2008. "Hymns to the God in which My Typewriter Believes", published in 2006, illustrates Sheppard's view of poetry as one art among many, as it alludes to and builds on other artforms. Sheppard's sonnet sequence, "Warrant Error" was published by Shearsman Books in 2009. According to Sean Colletti, Sheppard is a major talent, whose use of form includes precise use of the couplet, while Alan Baker calls his work "political poetry of the first order." According to critic James Byrne, "one of the ways Sheppard has extended the poetic tradition in England (where he has lived all his life) is via a complex reworking of poetic forms." Byrne asserts that "for Sheppard, as it was for Creeley and Charles Olson before him, ‘form is content'."

Sheppard has edited important studies of poets Roy Fisher and Lee Harwood, and is editor of the Journal of British and Irish Innovative Poetry" and the blogzine "Pages".

== Published works ==
Poetry:

- Returns:Textures,1985
- Daylight Robbery: Stride, 1990
- The Flashlight Sonata: Stride,1993
- Empty Diaries: Stride, 1998
- The Lores: Reality Street Editions, 2003
- The Anti-Orpheus: A Notebook
- Tin Pan Arcadia: Salt Publishing, 2004
- Hymns to the God in which My Typewriter Believes: Stride, 2006
- Complete Twentieth Century Blues: Salt Publishing, 2008
- Warrant Error, Exeter: Shearsman Books, 2009
- Berlin Bursts, Exeter: Shearsman Books, 2011
- A Translated Man, Exeter: Shearsman Books, 2013
- Words Out of Time, Newton-le-Willows: Knives, Forks and Spoons, 2015
- A Translated Man, Exeter: Shearsman Books, 2013
- History or Sleep: Selected Poems, Exeter: Shearsman Books, 2015
- Unfinish: London: Veer Publications, 2016
- Bad Idea, Newton-le-Willows: Knives Forks and Spoons, 2018
- The English Strain: Shearsman Books, 2021
- British Standards, Shearsman Books, 2024

Shorter Poetry Collections and Pamphlets:

- Dedicated to you but you weren’t listening, London: Writers Forum, 1979
- Returns, London:Textures,1985
- Private Number, London: Northern Lights Publishers, 1986
- Letter from the Blackstock Road, London: Oasis Books, 1988
- Internal Exile, Southampton: Torque Press,1988
- Codes and Diodes (with Bob Cobbing), London: Writers Forum, 1991
- Fox Spotlights, Cheltenham: The Short Run Press, 1995
- Free Fists (with Patricia Farrell), London: Writers Forum, 1996
- Neutral Drums (with Patricia Farrell), London: Writers Forum, 1999
- Blatent Blather/Virulent Whoops (with Bob Cobbing), London: Writers Forum, 2001
- The Anti-Orpheus: a notebook, Exeter: Shearsman Books, 2004. (Also available as an e-book at www.shearsman. com)
- Risk Assessment (with Rupert Loydell) Damaged Goods, 2006
- The Given, Newton-le-Willows: Knives Forks and Spoons, 2010
- The Only Life, Newton-le-Willows: Knives Forks and Spoons, 2012
- HAP: Understudies of Thomas Wyatt's Petrarch, Newton-le-Willows: Knives Forks and Spoons, 2018

As Editor:

- Floating Capital: New Poets from London
- News for the Ear: Homage to Roy Fisher
- The Salt Companion to Lee Harwood
- The Door of Taldire: Selected Pomes of Paul Evans
- Twitters for a Lark - Poetry of the European Union of Imaginary Authors
- Lee Harwood - New Collected Poems (with Kelvin Corcoran)

Criticism:

- For Language: Poetics and Linguistically Innovative Poetry 1978-1997
- The Poetry of Saying: British Poetry and its Discontents (Liverpool University Press, 2005)
- Iain Sinclair (Northcote House, 2007)
- The Necessity of Poetics (Shearsman Books, 2024)
