= Lee Harwood =

English poet (1939 – 2015)

- Born: Travers Rafe Lee Harwood; 6 June 1939; Leicester, England
- Died: 26 July 2015 (aged 76); Hove, East Sussex, England
- Education: Queen Mary University of London
- Occupation: Poet
- Spouse(s): Jenny Goodgame (m. 1961) Judith Walker (m. 1974)
- Children: 3
- Parent(s): Wilfred Travers Lee-Harwood; Grace Ladkin Harwood

Lee Harwood (6 June 1939 – 26 July 2015) was an English poet associated with the British Poetry Revival.

== Life ==
Travers Rafe Lee Harwood was born in Leicester to maths teacher Wilfred Travers Lee-Harwood and Grace Ladkin Harwood, who were then living in Chertsey, Surrey. His father was an army reservist and called up as war started; after the evacuation from Dunkirk he was posted to Africa until 1947 and saw little of his son. Between 1958 and 1961 Harwood studied English at Queen Mary College, University of London and continued living in London until 1967. During that time he worked as a monumental mason's mate, a librarian and a bookshop assistant. He was also a member of the Beat scene and in 1963 was involved in editing the one issue magazines Night Scene and Night Train featuring their work, as did Soho and Horde the following year. Tzarad, which he began editing on his own in 1965, ran for two more issues (1966, 1969) and signalled his growing interest in and involvement with the New York School of poets. It was during this time that he began to engage with French poetry and started on his translations of Tristan Tzara.

In 1967 he moved to Brighton where, with the exception of some time in Greece and the United States, he lived for the rest of his life. There he worked as a bookshop manager, a bus conductor, and a Post Office counter clerk. He also became a union official and involved with the Labour Party in its radical years, even standing (unsuccessfully) in a local election. At the Poetry Society Harwood was identified with the radicals but did not join in their block resignation in 1977, arguing that 'as a trade unionist I've never believed in resignation as a useful political weapon – it always seems best to work from inside an organisation'. At that time, there was an identifiable political element to Harwood's poetry, discernible in the volume "All The Wrong Notes" (1981).

In 1961 he married his first wife, Jenny Goodgame, with whom he had a son, Blake. After the breakdown of this marriage, he met the photographer Judith Walker while a writer in residence at the Aegean School of Fine Arts in Paros, Greece. Harwood married her in 1974 and they had two children, Rafe and Rowan. Photographs by Walker are used in his collections Boston-Brighton and All the wrong notes. Lee Harwood died on Sunday, 26 July 2015 in Hove, East Sussex. and was interred in Clayton Burial Ground near Hassocks, East Sussex. There is a tree (Mountain Ash), and memorial stone in the Literary Walk, in Central Park, New York City. There is also a memorial bench on the north path of Brunswick Square, Hove, UK.

== Poetry ==
Harwood's early writing is similar to the poetry of the New York School, especially that of John Ashbery, whom he met in Paris in 1965. What he was aiming for, he said in a 1972 interview, was an unfinished quality containing a mosaic of information. Robert Sheppard has described Harwood's style as at once 'distanced and intimate'. Later, after discussion with F. T. Prince, he aimed for a certain elegance where references to the English colonial enterprise function as an alternative cultural mythology. There is about this writing an aspect of collage (which Harwood likens to similar procedures in cinema and painting) which he takes even further in the collections published during the 1970s. Here lyric lines alternate with scraps of conversation, blocks of prose or long-lined verse. In his later work, however, some critics have discerned a falling off of immediacy while, in the view of others, such as Alan Baker, Harwood 'returned to form' with the books 'Morning Light' (1998) and 'Evening Star' (2004).

Harwood's first book, title illegible, was published by Bob Cobbing's Writers Forum in 1965. His Crossing the Frozen River: Selected Poems appeared from Paladin Books in 1988; Shearsman Books has since published both an updated Selected Poems (2008) and a definitive New Collected Poems (2023). Audio recordings of Harwood reading his poetry may be found on the University of Pennsylvania PennSound website Lee Harwood

== Bibliography ==
Poetry

- title illegible, Writers Forum, London (1965)
- The Man with Blue Eyes, Angel Hair Books, New York City (1966) – winner of the Frank O'Hara Prize
- The White Room, Fulcrum Press, London (1968)
- The Beautiful Atlas, Kavanagh, Brighton (1969)
- Landscapes, Fulcrum Press, London (1969)
- The Sinking Colony, Fulcrum Press, London (1970)
- The First Poem (Extract from The Long Black Veil) Unicorn Bookshop Poem card. 1971.
- Penguin Modern Poets 19 With John Ashbery & Tom Raworth, Penguin, Harmondsworth (1971)
- Freighters, Pig Press, Newcastle 1975
- H.M.S. Little Fox, Oasis Books, London (1975) – winner of the Alice Hunt Bartlett Prize
- Boston-Brighton, Oasis Books, London (1977); section D contained the long sequence "Notes of a post office clerk", the final two-thirds of which had appeared in Bezoar 3.4 (Gloucester Mass, USA, 1976)
- Old Bosham Bird Watch, Pig Press, Newcastle (1977); the title poem is reprised from Boston Brighton and followed by three more sequences written between 1976 and 1977
- Wish you were here With Antony Lopez, Transgravity Press (1979)
- All the Wrong Notes, Pig Press, Durham (1981)
- Faded Ribbons, Other Branch Readings, Leamington Spa (1982)
- Monster Masks, Pig Press, Durham (1985)
- Crossing the Frozen River: selected poems, Paladin, London (1988)
- Rope Boy to the Rescue North & South, Twickenham (1988)
- In the Mists: mountain poems, Slow Dancer Press, Nottingham (1993)
- Morning Light, Slow Dancer Press, London (1998)
- Etruscan Reader VI (with Robin Blaser and Barbara Guest), Etruscan Books, Wilkes-Barre, PA, USA, 1998
- Evening Star, Leafe Press, Nottingham (2004)
- Collected Poems 1964–2004, Shearsman Books, Exeter (2004)
- Gifts Received: 6 poems to friends, Artery Editions (2007)
- Selected Poems, Shearsman Books, Exeter (2008)
- The Books, Longbarrow Press, Swindon (2011)
- The Orchid Boat, Enitharmon Press, London (2014)
- New Collected Poems, Shearsman Books, Swindon (2023)

Translations of Tristan Tzara

- Cosmic Realities, Vanilla Tobacco Drawings, Arc Press, Gillingham (1969); reissued with French originals opposite by Arc Publications, Todmorden (1975)
- Destroyed Days: a selections of poems 1943–55, Voiceprint Editions, Wivenhoe Park, Essex (1971)
- Tristan Tzara: a bibliography, Aloes Books, London (1974)
- Tristan Tzara: selected poems, Trigram Press, London (1975)
- Chanson Dada: Tristan Tzara selected poems, Coach House Press / Underwhich Editions, Toronto, Canada (1987); revised edition from Black Widow Press, Boston, USA (2005)
- The Glowing Forgotten: A Selection of Poems, Leafe Press, Nottingham (2003)
- Chanson Dada: Tristan Tzara Selected Poems, Black Widow Press, Boston MA. (2009)

Others

- Captain Harwood's Log of Stern Statements and Stout Sayings, Writers Forum, London (1973)
- Wine Tales: Un Roman Devin with Richard Caddel, Galloping Dog Press, Newcastle upon Tyne (1984)
- Dream Quilt: 30 assorted stories, Slow Dancer Press, Nottingham (1985)
- Assorted Stories: prose works, Coffee House Press, Minneapolis (1987)
- Not The Full Story – Six Interviews With Lee Harwood (ed. Kelvin Corcoran), Shearsman Books, Exeter (2008)
