= Geraldine Monk =

British poet (born 1952)

Geraldine Monk (born 1952) is a British poet. She was born in Blackburn, Lancashire. Since the late 1970s, she has published many collections of poetry and has recorded her poetry in collaboration with musicians. Monk's poetry has been published in many anthologies, most recently appearing in the Anthology of 20th Century British and Irish Poetry.

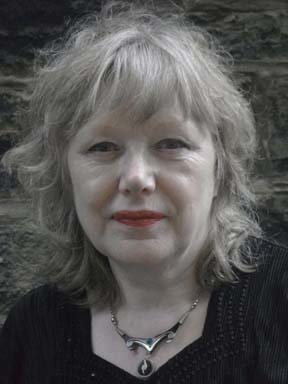
Monk in July 2013

== Life ==
Monk was born into a working-class family and raised as a Roman Catholic, something she believes has had an important effect on her work. She was, she said, "Brought up with a parallel world of saints, angels, martyrs, the Holy Ghost and the Blessed Virgin Mary. No wonder I was so easily spooked. The ‘other world’ was a reality from birth." She left Lancashire at the age of 18, and moved to Leeds. In 1974 she moved to Staithes, Yorkshire and began to write. The British Electronic Poetry Centre's entry for Geraldine Monk says: "1967 escaped school. 1969 escaped factories. 1974 escaped Leeds. Moved to Staithes, North Yorkshire for 10 years of 'splendid isolation', some very odd jobs and increasing preoccupation with reading and writing poetry." In 1984 Monk moved to Sheffield, where she has lived ever since. Monk was married to the English artist and poet Alan Halsey. Monk and Halsey were, between them, proprietors of West House Books which has published and promoted a number of Monk's collections, as well as publishing the work of many other contemporary poets. Halsey has also provided visual art and book designs for several of Monk's books. Monk gained a B.A. in English Studies from Sheffield City Polytechnic in 1988, and between 1992 and 1995 was Visiting lecturer in Creative Writing & Communication Studies at Chesterfield College. Between 1992 and 1999 she was Creative Writer at St. Luke's Hospice.

== Poetry ==
Monk's first pamphlet appeared in 1974, self-published under the imprint of Siren Press. From the mid-seventies onwards, her work was published by various small publishers, including Bob Cobbing's Writers Forum, and Peter Hodgkiss's Galloping Dog Press. From the start, and throughout her career, the importance of performance, and the sound of the spoken word has been a major part of Monk's poetry. She is regarded as an innovative, or experimental, poet. Her work incorporates song, found text, and material drawn from such sources as childhood games In 1994 she published the long poem "Interregnum", which is an account of the hanging of the Pendle witches in 1612. "Interregnum" includes themes of landscape, the relationship between the animal and human worlds, and patriarchal domination. The poem is seen as being in the tradition of political radicalism. Monk's most recent works, such as "Escafeld Hangings", continue one of her themes of women in history, focussing in that case, on Mary Queen of Scots. Monk has increasingly collaborated with musicians in her performances and recordings.

Monk's pamphlet publications, or publications in other media, are often brought together into larger books, such as Noctivagations (2001), a selected volume of work written since the mid-1990s. For example, Noctivagations includes the sequence "Songings" (the subject of Monk’s collaboration with Martin Archer). This piece, according to Scott Thurston 'resonates with lyric moments of visionary power'. The volume 'Lobe Scarps & Finials', published in 2011 by Leafe Press is similarly a gathering of work published during the preceding period. This collection has been described as containing "oppositions: between the individualism of lyric utterance and the political context in which it takes place; between the opacity produced by her densely patterned sounds ... and a plain-spoken brusqueness". In 2003, Salt Publishing brought out Monk's Selected Poems, and in 2007 also published The Salt Companion to Geraldine Monk, a book of critical works on her poetry.

== Bibliography ==
- Scarlet Opening (Siren Press, 1974)
- Invasion (Siren Press, 1976)
- Long Wake (London Writers' Forum/Pirate Press, 1979)
- Rotations (Siren Press, 1979)
- Banquet (Siren Press, 1980)
- Spreading the Cards (Siren Press, 1980)
- La Quinta del Sordo (Writers' Forum, 1980)
- Tiger Lilies (Rivelin Press, 1982)
- Animal Crackers (Writers Forum, 1984)
- Herein Lie Tales of Two Inner Cities (Writers' Forum, 1986)
- Sky Scrapers (Galloping Dog Press, 1985)
- Quadraversals (Writers' Forum, 1990)
- Walks in a Daisy Chain (Magenta, 1991)
- The Sway of Precious Demons: Selected Poems (North and South, 1992)
- Interregnum (Creation Books, 1994)
- Dream Drover (Siren Press, 1999)
- Trilogy (Gargoyle Editions, 2000)
- Noctivagations (West House Books, 2001)
- Insubstantial Thoughts on the Transubstantiation of the Text (West House Books/The Paper, 2002)
- Marian Hangings (Gargoyle Editions, 2002)
- Mary Through The Looking Glass (Gargoyle Editions, 2002)
- Absent Friends (Gargoyle Editions, 2002)
- Selected Poems (Salt Publishing, 2003)
- She Kept Birds (Slack Buddha Press, 2004)
- A Nocturnall Upon S. Lucies Day Being The Shortest Day (Gargoyle Editions, 2004)
- Escafeld Hangings (West House Books, 2005)
- Ghost & Other Sonnets (Salt Publishing, 2008)
- Lobe Scarps & Finials (Leafe Press, 2011)
- Pendle Witch-Words (Knives Forks and Spoons Press, 2012)
- CUSP: Recollections of Poetry in Transition, ed. Geraldine Monk, (Shearsman Books 2012)
- THEY WHO SAW THE DEEP (Parlor Press, 2016)

Monk also provided voice & words for the album Fluvium, collaborating with Martin Archer and Julie Tippetts, released by Discus Music.
