= Happy Dragons' Press =

The Happy Dragons' Press is a non-profit private press in North Essex, England, which publishes limited-edition volumes of poetry using letterpress printing methods.

There are two series produced by the press, the Dragon Poems in Translation series (edited by Shirley Toulson) and the New Garland series (edited by Rosemary Grant). The books are hand-printed in-house by founder Julius Stafford-Baker.

== History and operations ==
Founded in 1969 but originally producing only ephemera and the occasional book, the press was asked to adopt the Keepsake Poems project after the death of long-term collaborator Roy Lewis (founder of the Keepsake Press) and has since published 21 titles.

== Bibliography ==
- Blind Man's Buff by Edward Lowbury (2001)
- November Forest English by Anne Born, Swedish by Solveig von Schoultz, illustrated by Penny Berry (2002)
- Grace Notes by Karen Gershon, illustrated by Stella Tripp (2002)
- Girl, Dark Hued and Agile English by Albert Rowe, Spanish by Pablo Neruda, illustrated by Eric Ward (2002)
- Hop Pickers' Holiday by Gerda Mayer, illustrated by Clare Curtis (2003)
- Shelley Plain by Robert Greacen (2003)
- Out There in Rows by John Cotton, illustrated by Rigby Graham (2003)
- February English by Angela Livingstone, Russian by Boris Pasternak, illustrated by Gordon Bradshaw (2003)
- Where Do People Go by Bernard Kops, illustrated by Adam Kops (2004)
- Stone and Other Poems by Fred Sedgwick, illustrated by Peter Gauld (2004)
- White Magic English by Anita Debska, Polish by Krzysztof Kamil Baczynski, illustrated by Olga Sienko (2004)
- Fifty O'Clock by Dennis O'Driscoll, illustrated by Rigby Graham (2005)
- Starfall by Wes Magee, illustrated by Penny Berry (2005)
- Catching the Ebb Tide written and illustrated by Rosemary Lynne Grant (2006)
- A Place to Live by Vernon Scannell (2007)
- Wartime English by Taner Baybars, Turkish by Mehmet Yashin, illustrated by John R. Smith (2007)
- Small Parcel of Bones by David Charleston, illustrated by Penny Berry (2008)
- The Bone in Her Leg by John Mole, illustrated by Rigby Graham (2008)
- What It Is by Jane Wilde, illustrated by Olga Sienko (2009)
- Other Voices of the British Isles, an anthology of poetry in translation, featuring four dialects and nine languages (2010)

== Poetry in Translation ==
The press is notable for its focus on Poetry in Translation. Languages published to date include Cornish, German, Hebrew, Irish, Latin, Manx, Polish, Russian, Scots Gaelic, Spanish, Swedish and Turkish. A number of poems in local dialects such as Perthshire, Northumbrian, Lincolnshire and Shetland have also been published by the Happy Dragons' Press.

== Letterpress packing ==
The press is also notable for popularising a type of letterpress packing, used behind paper to improve impression quality, which they call Swiss Style Packing. The packing consists of a synthetic foam rubber blanket and a hard plastic top layer.

== See also ==
- Golden Cockerel Press
- Gregynog Press
- The Private Press Movement
