= Keepsake Press =

English private press

- Company type: Private
- Industry: Printing press
- Founder: Roy Lewis
- Headquarters: Richmond, United Kingdom

The Keepsake Press was a private press founded by English writer Roy Lewis. The press published more than 100 books and chapbooks using letterpress techniques. It ceased to operate in 1996 when Lewis died. Its archive is now housed at Reading University.

== Keepsake Poems ==
A series of 39 poetry chapbooks, The Keepsake Poems, was published between 1972 and 1979 by the press. All have a standard format of crown quarto wrapper enclosing a trimmed folded sheet. A poem and illustration were printed on the centre pages and the print run was generally of 180 copies. Contributors are listed as:

1. Incident at West Bay by Vernon Scannell, illustrated by Vana Haggerty [1972]
2. The Wake by Kevin Crossley-Holland, illustrated by Angela Lemaire
3. The Thrush by Anne Tibble, illustrated by Thomas Bewick and school
4. The Select Party by Gavin Ewart, illustrated by Arthur Merric Boyd
5. Crag of Craving by Thomas Blackburn, drawing by Margaret Macguire
6. Illness Russian by Boris Pasternak, English by Lydia Pasternak Slater, illustrated by Gordon Bradshaw
7. WHAT, by Christopher Logue
8. Two Confessions by Edward Lowbury, illustrated by Elizabeth Lewis [1973]
9. The Fox and the Pig by George Wightman, illustrated by Paul Peisch
10. Highgate by Owen Hickey, illustrated by Lorna Low
11. A Lunar Event written and illustrated by Alan Bold
12. The Breast by Glyn Hughes, illustrated by Ric Hyde
13. For Lofthouse written and illustrated by Robert Morgan
14. Six Women by Charles Causley, illustrated by Stanley Simmonds
15. Tankosaurus by Michael McCallion, illustrated by Anna McCallion
16. Roman Wall by John Cotton, illustrated by Rigby Graham
17. The Rehousing of Scaffardi by Barry Cole, illustrated by Geoff Stear [1974]
18. First Meeting by Karen Gershon, illustrated by Stella Tripp
19. Spring at St Clair by John Press, illustrated by Barry Hirst
20. Symphony in Moscow by D M Thomas, illustrated by Geoff Stear
21. Waiting for the Barbarians by Roy Fuller, illustrated by Barry Hirst
22. Two Prayers by Robert Nye, illustrated by Aileen Campbell Nye
23. The Kiss by Paul Roche, illustrated by Duncan Grant
24. Visual Aids by Norman Hidden, illustrated by Louise Chance
25. No Man's Land by Wes Magee, illustrated by Peter Barnfield [1976]
26. Four Ways With a Ruin by Shirley Toulson, illustrated by Anthea Lawrence
27. The Line of the Morning by Robin Munro, illustrated by Julius B. Stafford-Baker
28. Two Images of Continuing Trouble by Jon Silkin, illustrated by Alison Dalwood
29. Rider and Horse by Martin Booth, illustrated by Warwick Hutton
30. Cliff Walk by Anne Stevenson, illustrated by Ann Newnham [1977]
31. Buying a Sweater by Daniel Stokes, illustrated by Daphne Lord
32. After Rowlandson by Gordon Symes, illustrated by Thomas Rowlandson
33. The Saddled Man by George Macbeth, illustrated by Katherine Kadish [1978]
34. The Ill Match by Alan Tucker, illustrated by Helen Gleadow
35. On the Set by John Mole, illustrated by George Szirtes
36. Les Tres Riches Heures by Peter Porter, illustrated by John Piper
37. At the Sink by George Szirtes, illustrated by Clarissa Upchurch [1979]
38. Scrolls by Lotte Kramer, illustrated by Trevor Covey
39. Walking in the Harz Mountains by D J Enright, illustrated by Madeline Enright

== Selected publications ==
- Purple Gold Mountain: Poems from China by Ahmed Ali (1960)
- Landscapes by Camillo Pennati; English translation by Peter Russell; introduction by Salvatore Quasimodo (1964)
- Throwaway Lines by Gavin Ewart (1964)
- Poems and Drawings by Mervyn Peake (1965)
- Unpublished poems and drafts by James Elroy Flecker (1971)
- A Winnowing of Silence by Martin Booth ( 1971)
- The Gift by Peter Scupham (1973)
- The Other Planet by Roy Fuller (1979)
- The Epodes of Horace: a new English version by John Penman (1980)
- Politics and printing in Winchester, 1830–1880 by Roy Lewis (1980)
- Parables by Andrew Young (1985)
- Elizabeth Sorrell of Wells, her recipes and remedies: an eighteenth century kitchen commonplace book (1986)
- Prints and drawings by Owen Hickey (1986)

== Development ==
At school in Birmingham in 1928, Roy Lewis was introduced to the possibilities of letterpress magazine publishing and bought his first printing press shortly after. On this press he produced amateur magazines, The Lilliputian and The Meanderer. His father was keen to support his hobby and supplied him with a large quantity of type. During the Great Depression he sold his press, later recalling, "I cut printing out of my heart... and decided to grow up completely."

It was not until the late 1950s that Lewis began printing again, when he decided to demonstrate the craft to daughters Elizabeth and Miranda, using material produced by them. The Keepsake Press was founded in the garden shed soon after, with the intention of publishing both established and un-established writers and artists. Its commercial policy was equally reach-me-down, the sales 'office' being "confined to some ring binders and a pile of filing boxes". Since print-runs were limited, most impressions were sold out within 18 months or less.

The press' association with Edward Lowbury, whom Lewis had known at university, was particularly close. Lowbury's Metamorphoses (1958) was the first non-family production from the press, followed by eight more by him of which the last, First Light, was printed in 1990, two years after the press had officially ceased business. The following is a check list of these:

- Metamorphoses, 1958, 16pp, 80 copies
- New Poems, 1965, 180 signed copies
- Figures of Eight, with drawings by Bryan Brooke, 1969, 22pp, 150 copies
- Two Confessions, with a linocut by Elizabeth Lewis (the printer's daughter), No. 8 in the Keepsake Poems series, 1973, 4pp, 180 copies – 12 signed by poet and artist
- Poetry and Paradox: an essay with 19 relevant poems, 1976, 32pp, 250 copies in three different bindings: ISBN 0-901924-40-7
- A Letter from Masada, with drawings by Miriam Sachs, 1982, 12pp, 200 copies: ISBN 0-901924-58-X
- Birmingham! Birmingham!, with drawings by Kenneth Lindley, 1985, 32pp, 340 copies: ISBN 0-901924-69-5
- A Letter from Hampstead: a doctor remembers his patient, Bernard van Dieren, published on the centenary of the composer's birth, 1987, 18pp, 250 copies: ISBN 0-901924-75-X
- First Light, 1991, card cover, 16pp, 135 copies: ISBN 0-901924-79-2

Lewis learned as he went along and was constantly experimenting. The production of Metamorphoses helped him master a large Columbian press that printed four pages at a time. In 1976 he went to night school in order to learn monotype and so was able to produce the ambitious large work represented by Poetry and Paradox. Previously his largest book had been the 24-page anthology Moments of Truth containing short poems by 19 high-profile poets of the day: George Barker, Martin Bell, John Betjeman, Edwin Brock, Robert Conquest, Gavin Ewart, Roy Fuller, Thom Gunn, Bernard Gutteridge, Francis Hope, Ted Hughes, Edward Lowbury, Kathleen Nott, Peter Porter, Peter Redgrove, James Reeves, Peter Russell, David Wevill and Hugo Williams. Published in 1965, twelve copies were given each poet and the remaining 100 were offered for sale.

Not all the work was by contemporary authors. There was a holograph Robert Burns poem, a translation of poems by Hans Christian Andersen and a very limited edition of Oscar Wilde's The Harlot's House. This involved the press in its boldest experiment of all, which was achieved with the help of the Happy Dragons' Press. The artist Daphne Lord provided drawings which Julius Stafford-Baker of Happy Dragons then made into lino cuts. A special process was used to create silhouettes by blowing aerosol paint through the stencils in five colours, including gold and silver metallics. About 50 copies were produced as Christmas gifts for 1967.

== The Birmingham connection ==
The connection with Edward Lowbury also brought in other contributions to the press. Principally he was responsible for the Parables of his late father-in-law, Andrew Young (1985). A selection of the author's mini-sermons originally published anonymously in his parish magazine, it ran into two editions of 200 copies each. Seven of the 16 pages had wood engravings by Joan Hassall, illustrator of several of Young's books, including the Collected Poems of 1950 and 1960. Keepsake's little work was a celebratory accompaniment to The Poetical Works of Andrew Young which appeared that same year, edited by Lowbury and his wife Alison and, again, illustrated by Joan Hassall. Other artists introduced to the press by Lowbury included Kenneth Lindley, who provided the woodcuts for Birmingham! Birmingham!, and Bryan Brooke, who illustrated Figures of Eight. The latter was a medical colleague that Lowbury had got to know while he was working at Queen Elizabeth Hospital in Birmingham. Lowbury was himself a distinguished medical specialist and had been living in the city since 1949.

Lewis' former connection with Birmingham formed another bond and lay behind the choice of other items printed by the press. Looking over Lowbury's manuscripts while on a visit, Lewis noticed two or three poems about the city and persuaded him to write more to form the collection Birmingham! Birmingham! Even before that, however, Lewis had printed Cannon Hill Park (1969) about another city location, in this case consisting of three ballads with music and design by Don Collis. Yet one more Birmingham connection surfaces in Robert Leach's Cats Free and Familiar (1974), whose author had been Head of English at Great Barr Comprehensive School and was then on the way to make a local name for himself in theatre.

== Association with the Happy Dragons' Press ==
Roy Lewis left his printing equipment and metal type to Julius Stafford-Baker of the Happy Dragons' Press, a friend and printer who had assisted with a number of the Keepsake Poems. The press also 'inherited' editor Shirley Toulson from Keepsake and under her guidance began a programme of poetry publishing closely related to the Keepsake Poems.
