= Juhi Babbar =

Indian film and television actress

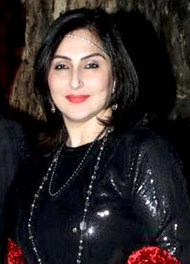
- Babbar in 2019
- Born: Lucknow, Uttar Pradesh, India
- Occupation: Actress
- Years active: 2003–present
- Spouses: Bejoy Nambiar (m. 2007; div. 2009) Anup Soni (m. 2011)
- Children: 1
- Parent(s): Raj Babbar; Nadira Babbar
- Relatives: See Babbar family

Juhi Babbar Soni (née Babbar) is an Indian film and television actress. She has contributed to theatre both as an actor and director. She is the daughter of the actor Raj Babbar.

== Early life ==
Juhi Babbar was born to actor, Raj Babbar, and theatre actress, Nadira Babbar. She graduated from NIFT, Mumbai. Urdu writers, Syed Sajjad Zaheer and Razia Sajjad Zaheer were her maternal grandparents.

== Personal life ==
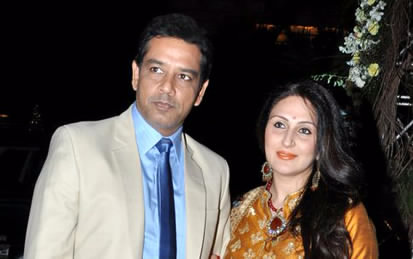
Juhi Babbar and Anup Soni in Jan 2013

Juhi's first husband was Bejoy Nambiar, a screenplay writer. She married Bejoy on 27 June 2007. The couple divorced in January 2009. She then fell in love with the TV actor Anup Soni. She met Anup while working in a play produced by Juhi's mother Nadira Babbar. Soni was then married to Ritu, with whom he had two daughters. Juhi and Anup Soni got married on 14 March 2011, after finalizing his divorce. Juhi and Soni have a son, born in 2012.

== Career ==
Juhi made her film debut in Kash Aap Hamare Hote opposite Sonu Nigam. In 2005, she did a Punjabi film with Jimmy Shergill, Yaara Naal Baharan. The film did well in Punjab and with the overseas Punjabi audience. Juhi then did a silent film with Malayalam actor Mohanlal. In 2006, she was seen in the film Unns with actor Sanjay Kapoor and Rituparna Sengupta. She appeared in her next film It's My Life as Sonia Jaisingh opposite actors Harman Baweja, Genelia D'Souza and Nana Patekar. In 2009, Juhi played the role of a house wife in the TV comedy Ghar Ki Baat Hai produced by Shah Rukh Khan.

== Filmography ==
=== Films ===
| Year | Title | Role | Notes | Ref. |
|---|---|---|---|---|
| 2003 | Kash Aap Hamare Hote | Amrita Singh | | |
| 2005 | Yaaran Naal Baharan | Harman Kaur | Punjabi film | |
| 2005 | Reflections | Female lead | Silent short film | |
| 2006 | Unns: Love... Forever | Advocate Natasha Patel | | |
| 2013 | It's My Life | Sonia Jaisingh | | |
| 2018 | Aiyaary | Wife of Colonel Abhay Singh | | |
| 2023 | Faraaz | Simeen | | |
| 2023 | Farrey | Zoya | | |
| 2025 | Tu Meri Poori Kahani | Swara | | |
| 2025 | The Great Shamsuddin Family | Humaira | | |

=== Television ===
| Year | Title | Language | Role | Notes |
|---|---|---|---|---|
| 2009 | Ghar Ki Baat Hai | Hindi | Radhika Yagnik | |

== Theatre ==
=== Actor ===
| Year | Title | Language | Role | Theatre | Ref |
|---|---|---|---|---|---|
| 2012 | Begum Jaan | English / Hindi | Granddaughter | Prithvi Theatre | |
| 2012 | Pencil Se Brush Tak | English / Hindi | MF Hussain's wife | | |

=== Director ===
| Year | Title | Language | Notes | Ref |
|---|---|---|---|---|
| 2007 | Pukar | English / Hindi | Play created for CRY (Child Rights and You) that is based on child labour | |

== Awards ==
| Year | Award | Category | Work | Result | Notes | References |
|---|---|---|---|---|---|---|
| 2010 | Ustad Bismillah Khan Yuva Rashtriya Puraskar | Under-35 | Contribution towards Indian arts and theatre | Won | | |
