= Khalid Alvi =

Indian academic

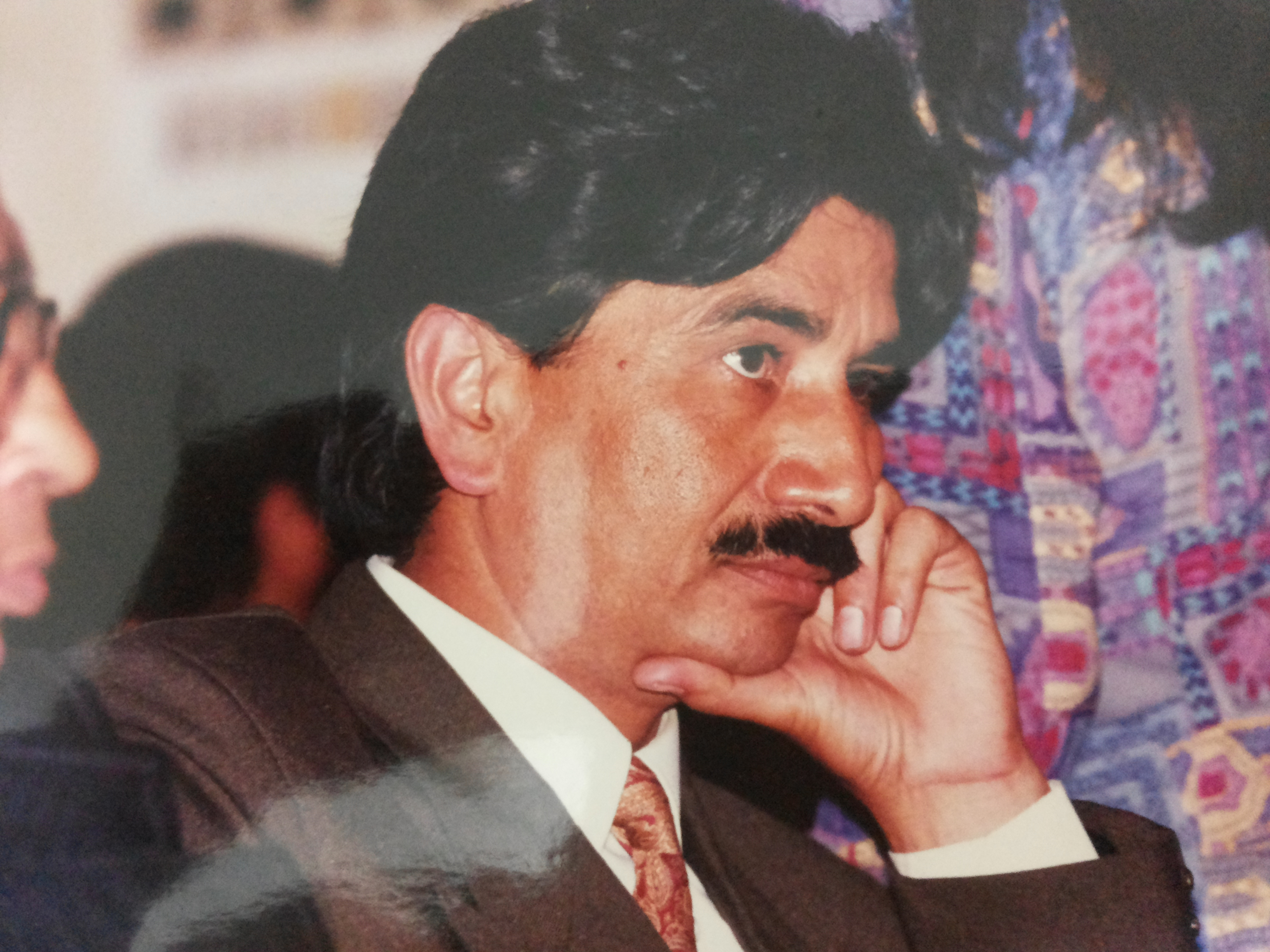
- Born: 20 June 1962 (age 63); Chandpur, Bijnor, Uttar Pradesh, India
- Education: PhD (Delhi University)

Khalid Alvi also known as Khalid Mustafa Alvi is a professor at the University of Delhi, critic, and Urdu poet. He has written twelve books and edited the English journal Furtherance and the Urdu monthly Shahkaar. Some of his works have been translated into German, Persian and Uzbek Languages.

== Early life and education ==
Khalid Alvi received his early education in his home town Chandpur, Bijnor, Uttar Pradesh and then he joined the University of Delhi as a Research Scholar. During his stay at University of Delhi as a research scholar he was invited to deliver a series of lecture on Indian literature by Peshawar University, Oriental Institute Tashkent and some other Organisations in various parts of the world.

== Career ==
After Alvi finished his MPhil, he was offered an assistant professorship at the college of Delhi University.

=== Writing ===
One of Alvi's books, Angarey, has been the subject of controversy. The book is a collection of Urdu short stories, first published in the 1930s, and then banned in 1933. It was written by Sajjad Zaheer, Rashid Jahan, Mahmud-uz-Zafar and Ahmed Ali Alvi reissued the book in 1993, but, when doing so, had to excise major portions of it. In 2014 he along with Vibha S. Chauhan translated the book in English.

== Bibliography ==
- Hifazat e hadis
- Angarey ka tareekhi pasmenzar
- Peghambrana duaen
