= Kash Aap Hamare Hote =

Kash… Aap Hamare Hote
- Film poster
- Directed by: Ravindra Peepat
- Written by: Atul Tiwari; Ravindra Peepat
- Produced by: Nadira Babbar
- Starring: Sonu Nigam; Juhi Babbar
- Cinematography: Manmohan Singh
- Edited by: Akiv Ali
- Music by: Aadesh Shrivastava
- Production company: Babbars Films
- Release date: 14 February 2003
- Country: India
- Language: Hindi
- Budget: ₹5 crore
- Box office: ₹1.64 crore

Kash... Aap Hamare Hote (translation: Wish... You Were Mine) is a 2003 Indian Hindi-language romantic drama film directed by Ravindra Peepat. It stars Sonu Nigam and Juhi Babbar. The music was composed by Aadesh Shrivastava.

== Plot ==
Amrita is the adopted daughter of Yashwant Raj Mankotia. Amrita was the daughter of the late Yashwant Raj's friend. Yashwant has a son, Randeep Raj Mankotia, who is in Canada. Yashwant plans to get Randeep and Amrita married. Randeep does not want to go to India to visit his father. To make Randeep come to Yashwant, he pretends to have heart trouble. Randeep does not want to leave his business. He gets even more upset when he learns that he is going to marry Amrita. His father says if he does not accept the marriage, all his property will go to Amrita. Randeep agrees to the marriage. After the wedding, Randeep and Amrita travel to Canada. When they go to Randeep's house, Amrita meets Simone, Randeep's business partner/spouse. Simone and Randeep humiliate Amrita, and she runs away. Randeep gathers some men and orders them to find Amrita and kill her. Amrita then hides in the garage of Jay Kumar, who befriends her. Daljit Brar [Dolly] is the daughter of Jay's boss and is jealous of the friendship between them, so she fires Jay. Yashwant Raj misses Amrita, so he goes to Canada to visit her. When Yashwant asks where Amrita is, Randeep lies and says she has humiliated him by taking up alcohol. Yashwant doesn't believe this; he goes to find her and the truth. Afterward, he finds out that his son has not only disgraced Amrita but is doing illegal drug business with Simone. After a brawl, Yashwant kills his son, and he is later discharged by the court, and he decides to go back home while blessing Amrita and Jay.

== Cast ==
- Sonu Nigam as Jay Kumar
- Juhi Babbar as Amrita Raj Mankotia
- Om Puri as Yashwant Raj Mankotia
- Sharad Kapoor as Randeep "Ronny" Raj Mankotia
- Saadhika as Simone
- Raavee Gupta as Daljit Brar (Dolly)
- Raj Babbar as Sardar Teja Singh Brar
- Johnny Lever as Native Indian

== Soundtrack ==
Kash Aap Hamare Hote

Soundtrack album by Aadesh Shrivastava
- Released: 6 December 2002
- Genre: Feature film soundtrack
- Label: T-Series

The music of Kash Aap Hamare Hote was composed by Aadesh Shrivastava. Most songs were sung by Sonu Nigam while the remaining songs were sung by Alka Yagnik, Sukhwinder Singh, Manmohan Singh and Anuradha Paudwal.

- "Mera Hindustan Hai" – Sonu Nigam
- "Hum Bhi Mohabbat" – Sonu Nigam
- "Chalte Chalte" – Sonu Nigam
- "Kash Aap Hamare Hote" (Sad Version) –Sonu Nigam
- "Kash Aap Hamare Hote" (Happy Version) – Sonu Nigam, Alka Yagnik
- "Tumse Hui" – Sonu Nigam, Anuradha Paudwal
- "Shaava Pardesiyon" – Sonu Nigam, Sukhwinder Singh
- "Dhaani Chunariya" – Alka Yagnik
- "Dil Main Sau" — Manmohan Singh
- "Hai Rabba" — Manmohan Singh

== Reception ==
Taran Adarsh of IndiaFM gave the film 1 star out of 5, writing ″On the whole, KASH AAP HAMARE HOTE is an ordinary fare. At the box-office, the film will face rough weather due to a strong opposition in the form of 2003 Cricket World Cup. Had the film released at a more appropriate period and without oppositions, the prospects would've been better.″ Sukanya Verma of Rediff.com wrote ″The best thing about the film is Manmohan Singh's cinematography. A Yash Chopra regular, Singh captures gorgeous Canada beautifully.″But then, films do not run on stunning locations, technical superiority or catchy music. Kash... simply lacks appeal in all other departments.″
