= Abdullah Malik =

Pakistani journalist, historian (1920–2003)

- Born: 10 October 1920; Lahore, British India
- Died: 10 April 2003 (aged 82); Islamabad, Pakistan
- Education: Government Islamia College
- Occupations: Journalist, Writer, Columnist, Historian

Abdullah Malik (10 October 1920 – 10 April 2003) was a Pakistani journalist, writer and political historian. While being an active member of communist party, he contributed to Pakistan movement as a journalist. He worked at various newspapers as a foreign correspondent such Daily Imroze and Pakistan Times of Progressive Papers Limited. He also wrote more than twenty-four books, most of which are focused on the history of Punjab and Indo-Pakistani wars and conflicts.

== Biography ==
Abdullah Malik was born in a Kakazai family on 10 October 1920 in Lahore, British India. He obtained his education from the Government Islamia College. After he established his association with Movement for Liberation, he remained associated with the Communist Party of India until he died.

In the 1940s, Malik worked for CPI's newspapers Qaumi Jang which played a significant role to the cause of dominion of India and Pakistan. Later, after the partition of the Indian subcontinent, he was jailed in Lahore Fort prison in 1951.

In the 1960s, Malik served as London correspondent for Daily Imroze and the Pakistan Times' newspapers. However in 1971, he was jailed by the military dictator Yahya Khan for opposing military operation in East Pakistan. He was among the few Pakistanis who supported Bangladesh Liberation War, following which he was dismissed from the job at Daily Imroze, which was controlled by the military dictators at the time.

Following his dismissal, Malik established Azad, a daily national newspaper which was later banned by the military after Bangladesh's liberation war broke out. Prior to its closure, he wrote columns and on historical topics for the newspapers besides producing scholarly works on history and politics.

== Death ==
Malik was suffering from a chronic condition of a lung disease. He was subsequently admitted to Pakistan Institute of Medical Sciences where he died on 10 April 2003. He has two sons.
