= Tu Meri Poori Kahani =

2025 Indian romantic drama film

- Theatrical release poster
- Directed by: Suhrita Das
- Written by: Shweta Bothra; Suhrita Das
- Produced by: Ajay Murdia
- Starring: Hirranya Ojha; Arhaan Pateel; Shammi Duhan; Tigmanshu Dhulia; Juhi Babbar
- Cinematography: Sayak Bhattacharya
- Edited by: Kuldip Mehan
- Music by: Anu Malik
- Production company: Indira Entertainment LLP
- Release date: 26 September 2025
- Country: India
- Language: Hindi

Tu Meri Poori Kahani is a 2025 Indian Hindi-language musical romantic drama film directed by Suhrita Das. The film produced by Ajay Murdia and created by Mahesh Bhatt. It stars newcomer Hirranya Ojha, Arhaan Pateel and Shammi Duhan with Tigmanshu Dhulia and Juhi Babbar.

It was released theatrically on 26 September 2025.

== Premise ==
A young star, chasing fame and success, discovers that true fulfillment comes not from the spotlight but from the sincerity of real love and human connection

== Cast ==
- Hirranya Ojha as Anicka
- Arhaan Pateel as Rohan Dixit
- Shammi Duhan as Raj Mehta
- Tigmanshu Dhulia as Diwakar Kaushik
- Juhi Babbar as Swara
- Avtar Gill
- Uday Chandra

== Music ==
The music of this film was composed by Anu Malik andlyrics is written by Shweta Bothra .

Tu Meri Poori Kahani

Soundtrack album by Anu Malik
- Released: 26 September 2025
- Genre: Feature film soundtrack
- Language: Hindi
- Label: saregama

Track listing
No.	Title	Lyrics	Music	Singer(s)	Length
1.	"Tu Meri Poori Kahani - Male Version"	Shweta Bothra	Anu Malik	Papon	6:11
2.	"Yeh Ishq Hai - Raghav Chaitanya Version Neend Bhi Teri"	Shweta Bothra	Anu Malik	Raghav Chaitanya	6:14
3.	"Kuch Toh Hai - Female Version"	Shweta Bothra	Anu Malik	Aanandi Joshi	7:11
4.	"Bhoolane Ki Tumko - Male Version"	Shweta Bothra	Anu Malik	Papon	6:07
5.	"Tu Meri Poori Kahani -Rock Version"	Shweta Bothra	Anu Malik	Vishal Mishra	2:17
6.	"Ab Jab Ki Tu Nahi Hai - Female Version"	Shweta Bothra	Anu Malik	Aanandi Joshi	5:36
7.	"Kaun Hai Woh - Male Version"	Shweta Bothra	Anu Malik	Papon	5:46
8.	"Tu Meri Poori Kahani - Female Version"	Shweta Bothra	Anu Malik	Anmol Malik	6:17
9.	"Bhoolane Ki Tumko - Female Version"	Shweta Bothra	Anu Malik	Aanandi Joshi	6:36
Total length:					79:47

== Release ==
It is released on 22 September 2025.

== Reception ==
Vinamra Mathur of Firstpost gave 3 stars out of 5 and said that "Suhrita Das makes a confident directorial debut. The first time filmmaker manages to capture the rawness of relationships while maintaining a restrained appeal." Jaya Dwivedie of India TV gave 3 stars out of 5 and said that "Tu Meri Poori Kahani is an emotional and deeply moving drama that explores the clash between love and ambition in modern youth. Dhaval Roy of The Times of India rated it 2.5/5 stars and stated that "While Tu Meri Poori Kahani has moments of poignancy, its predictability and slow pacing hold it back from becoming a truly engaging watch."

Simran Khan of Times Now also rated it 2.5/5 stars and stated that "Tu Meri Poori Kahani is a tiring one-time watch, with barely any heartfelt moments and only a few decent musical tracks. It lacks the impact needed to leave a lasting impression." Satish Sundaresan of Free Press Journal observed that "in a time when the silver screen is being dominated by the likes of Saiyaara and others, a film like Tu Meri Poori Kahani really has to work its way up (read ‘struggle’) to make a mark." Subhash K Jha of News 24 gave 3.5 stars out of 5 and commented that "Debutante director Suhrita Das’ Tu Meri Poori Kahani, in spite of its flaws, is that precious little baby that you want to cuddle close to your chest and protect it from the dushman zamana."
