= Animal Kingdom: Let's Go Ape =

- Theatrical release poster.
- Directed by: Jamel Debbouze
- Screenplay by: Jamel Debbouze; Fred Fougea; Ahmed Hamid; Victor Mayence; Pierre Ponce; John R. Smith; Rob Sprackling
- Story by: Jamel Debbouze; Fred Fougea; Jean-Luc Fromental
- Based on: The Evolution Man by Roy Lewis
- Produced by: Fred Fougea; Romain Le Grand
- Starring: Jamel Debbouze; Mélissa Theuriau; Arié Elmaleh
- Edited by: Dorian Rigal-Ansous
- Music by: Laurent Perez del Mar
- Production companies: Pathé; Boréales; Kiss Films; M6 Films; Cattleya uFilm
- Distributed by: Pathé Distribution
- Release date: 8 April 2015
- Running time: 113 minutes 91 minutes (English dub)
- Countries: Belgium; China; France; Italy
- Languages: French; English
- Budget: €32 million
- Box office: $14.3 million

Animal Kingdom: Let's Go Ape (French: Pourquoi j'ai pas mangé mon père), also titled Evolution Man and Why I Did (Not) Eat My Father, is a 2015 animated adventure comedy film directed by Jamel Debbouze in collaboration with producer Fred Fougea. The film is a loose adaptation on the 1960 novel The Evolution Man by Roy Lewis from an original screenplay by Fred Fougea and Jean-Luc Fromental.

An English dub of the film was made, but was cut 22 minutes shorter for its dark tones towards children.

== Synopsis ==
Édouard is the eldest son of the King of the Simiens. But due to his puny appearance, he was rejected by his tribe at birth. He therefore grew up far from his family. With Ian, who becomes his friend, he discovers fire, hunting, modern habitat, love and even hope. Generous, he will go so far as to lead his people with brilliance and humor towards true humanity.

== Voice cast ==
- Jamel Debbouze and Ben Bishop (English dub) as Édouard.
- Mélissa Theuriau and Sohm Kapila (English dub) as Lucie.
- Arié Elmaleh and Ray Gillon (English dub) as Ian.
- Patrice Thibaud and Wayne Forester (English dub Vladimir) as Vladimir / and Geoff Searle (English dub Sergey) Sergey.
- Christian Hecq and Ray Gillon (English dub) as Siméon.
- Youssef Hajdi and Ray Gillon (English dub) as Marcel.
- Adrien Antoine and Ben Bishop (English dub) as Vania.
- Diouc Koma as Vania. (motion-capture)
- Johanna Hilaire and Julia Boecker (English dub) as Gudule.
- Dorothée Pousséo and Melanie Cooper (English dub) as Myrtille.
- Dominique Magloire and Georgina Lamb (English dub) as Mamacita.
- Enzo Ratsito and Beau Thomas (English dub) as Diego.
- Charlotte des Georges and Melanie Cooper (English dub Fleura) as Fleura / and Anjella Mackintosh as (English dub Victoire) as Victoire.
- Nathalie Homs and Georgina Lamb (English dub) as The Witch.
- Georgette Kala-Lobé as The Witch. (motion-capture)
- Cyril Casmèze and Jack Cooke (English dub) as Hubert.
- Dominique Magloire and Georgina Lamb (English dub) as Mamacita.
- D'Jal and Tracey Ayer (English dub) as The Prehistoric Portuguese.

== Production ==
The film is shot entirely in motion capture. Thanks to this process, Louis de Funès, who died in 1983, could be used as a model for the character of Vladimir, the animators having used images from his films.

Filmed on a 150 m^{2} set with 60 cameras, it uses special headsets for facial motion capture. To uncorrelate financing and localization, the production marketed the faces of several characters in Italy and China in order, on the one hand, to obtain investments, and on the other hand to generate additional interest in theaters during the release in these country. All post-production (lighting, rendering, visual effects, compositing) was done by Prana Studios in India.

== Reception ==
In France, Animal Kingdom: Let's Go Ape received mixed reviews in the press. In Le Monde, Isabelle Regnier praised “the irresistible funnyness of Debbouze’s phrasing”. In L'Express, believed that “the form serves the substance wonderfully” and that “the animation is magnificent”. In the cultural weekly Télérama, Guillemette Odicino remarked that "Jamel wants to say everything - and we understand it - in an hour and a half, about disability, the suburbs, love, fraternity and living better together" and that the resulting scenario is a bit “catch-all” , but she judged that the whole thing remained a “good surprise”, which she compares to “a Disney on soul music, written by Gérard Oury of Rabbi Jacob". In Le Journal du Dimanche, Danielle Attali judges the film “clever, lively, funny and moving” and is convinced in particular by the “comical and charming” universe to which is added a touch of poetry; she only regrets that the second part loses energy due to being more demonstrative. In Ouest France, Pierre Fornerod finds that "fascinated by the technique of motion capture and 3D, [the film] sometimes forgets to make people laugh" , but adds that the last part of the film improves from this point of view.

Other critics weren't entirely convinced. The free daily Metro thus published two reviews, one very favorable and the other very negative. In the first, Marilyne Letertre believes that the film "in fact contains all the prerequisites of a youth production: rhythm, adventure, humor accessible to all and love, in the broad sense of the term" and salutes its artistic and graphic success. She criticizes some of the critics for “attacking Jamel when he does Jamel in his first film" while no one criticizes Woody Allen for "filming New York bobos for decades". Conversely, Mehdi Omaïs, while he welcomes Jamel Debbouze's risk-taking and his work to bring Roy Lewis' novel to the screen, considers the result disappointing, judging the settings and characters ugly and the writing "uneven, unfinished and weighed down with metaphors as unsightly as an elephant trapped in a china shop (on exclusion, among others)" and had "the constant feeling of supporting a one-man show which did not really have its place in the context of an animated film" which he would have liked to be more universal. In Marianne, Danièle Heymann describes Jamel Debbouze's first production as "often spectacular, terribly noisy, aesthetically questionable, and at times extremely touching". In the cinema magazine Positif, Philippe Rouyer regrets "the perpetual agitation which seems to have become the norm in recent years in animated blockbusters", but praises "the technical performance and some good gags which play on anachronisms to spin the metaphor of the suburbs and sketch a fantasized self-portrait of the charismatic Jamel.

Among the most negative reviews, the weekly magazine L'Obs called it a "totally indigestible turkey", Le Figaro a "failure" with a "sluggish script" and "very banal dialogue". For Critikat, they called the film “entangled in a purring production” served by the volubility of Debbouze "sometimes indigestible".

On the Allociné website, the press gives it an average of 3.1/5 based on 28 press reviews. Viewers give it an average of 2.3/5 based on 2,261 ratings including 387 reviews.

The movie received negative reviews internationally for its uncanny valley appearances, some critics considered the film as it copied elements from The Lion King and The Croods. It earned a 4.9 on IMDb.

== Box office ==
Released in France, during the Easter holidays and after an aggressive marketing campaign, the film achieved some success with a little over 656,000 admissions in the first week, then the film ran out of steam with a little over 500,000 admissions in the second week. 424,000 in the third week and a little over 388,000 in the fourth week, or 1.9 million admissions in one month. The word of mouth effect did not work for the film and after seven weeks of exhibition in more than 700 theaters, the film accumulated 2.3 million admissions. At the end of 2015, Animal Kingdom: Let's Go Ape was one of 13 French films to have exceeded one million admissions during the year and totaled 2.4 million admissions.

With an official budget of 32 million euros excluding the marketing campaign, the film needed many more admissions to be profitable. The results are therefore rather negative for the distributor Pathé which invested around 20 million out of the 32.
