= Angarey =

1932 Urdu short story collection

- Author: Sajjad Zaheer; Rashid Jahan; Mahmud-uz-Zafar; Ahmed Ali
- Original title: Angarey
- Language: Urdu
- Publisher: Nizami Press (Lucknow)
- Publication date: 1932 (first edition)
- Publication place: British India
- Media type: Print

Angarey or Angaaray (translated alternatively as "Embers" or "Burning Coals") is a collection of nine short stories and a one act play in Urdu by Sajjad Zaheer, Rashid Jahan, Mahmud-uz-Zafar and Ahmed Ali first published in 1932 and generally considered to have marked the beginning of the Progressive Writers' Movement in Indian literature. The release of the book was marked by protests and it was subsequently banned by the government of the United Provinces a few months after publication.

== Content ==
The volume consists of nine short stories and a one-act play.

- Garmiyon ki Ek Raat (A Summer Night) – Sajjad Zaheer
- Dulari – Sajjad Zaheer
- Jannat ki Basharat (Heaven Assured!) – Sajjad Zaheer
- Neend Nahin Aati (Insomnia) Sajjad Zaheer
- Phir Yeh Hungama (The Same Uproar, Once Again) – Sajjad Zaheer
- Dilli ki Sair (A Trip to Delhi) – Rashid Jahan
- Jawanmardi (Masculinity) – Mahmud-uz-Zafar (Note: Jawanmardi was originally written by Mahmud-us-Zafar in English and was translated by Sajjad Zaheer to Urdu for this book .)
- Badal Nahin Aate (The Clouds Don’t Come) – Ahmed Ali
- Muhavatton ki Ek Raat (A Night of Winter Rain) – Ahmed Ali (Note: Muhavatton ki Ek Raat was first published in the literary journal Humayun in January 1932 .)
- Parde ke piche (Behind the Veil: A One Act Play) – Rashid Jahan

== Themes ==
Sajjad Zaheer, Rashid Jahan, Ali Ahmed and Mahmud-uz-Zafar were all educated in Oxford and were heavily inspired by the writings of James Joyce, Virginia Woolf and D. H. Lawrence and in some cases from Marxist writings. They were not only critical of conservative elements within the Muslim community but also of the corrosive effects of British imperial rule in India. The stories of Zaheer related enslavement to social and religious practice based on ignorance. They protested against the prevailing social, religious and political institutions and the economic inequality of the society. Zaheer's stories also dealt with sexual desire and sexual repression and highlighted the ways that religious and social restrictions unnecessarily damage the human psyche. The stories of Rashid Jahan dealt with oppressive worlds of Muslim women and the outdated religious and social dogma their societies. Ali's stories delved primarily on the condition of women like poverty, domestic abuse, sexual desire and longing experienced by widows.

== Controversy ==
=== Reception ===
Angaray was first published in December 1932 by the Nizami Press, Lucknow. The book created controversy in the Muslim community of the British India upon its release and was met with outrage from both the religious and civil authorities. Newspapers and journals wrote angry editorials denouncing the book. Hindustan times carried an article ‘Urdu Pamphlet Denounced: Shias Gravely Upset' quoting a resolution passed by the All India Shia Conference Lucknow condemning the publication of the book. Agitations were held in Lucknow and Aligarh and the copies of the book were burnt in public. The book was reviewed by scholars and critics like Akhtar Hussain Raipuri, Munshi Daya Narain Nigam and Muhammad Mujib of Jamia Millia Islamia who wrote detail critique on the book.

=== Ban ===
Four months after publication, on 15 March 1933, the book was banned by the government of the United Provinces under Section 295A of the Indian Penal Code. All but five copies were destroyed by the police, two of which were sent to British Library’s Oriental and India Office Collections.

However, even after Angarey was proscribed, the four authors refused to apologize for it. On 5 April 1933, Mahmud-uz-Zafar wrote an article, ‘In Defence of Angarey’ for The Leader, a newspaper published from Allahabad.The piece was also reproduced in some other papers, including the Hindustan Times. Subtitled ‘Shall We Submit to Gagging?’ it read:

The authors of this book do not wish to make any apology for it. They leave it to float or sink of itself. They are not afraid of the consequences of having launched it. They only wish to defend 'the right of launching it and all other vessels like it' ... they stand for the right of free criticism and free expression in all matters of the highest importance to the human race in general and the Indian people in particular... Whatever happen to the book or to the authors, we hope that others will not be discouraged. Our practical proposal is the formation immediately of a League of Progressive Authors, which should bring forth similar collections from time to time both in English and the various vernaculars of our country. We appeal to all those who are interested in this idea to get in touch with us.

== Impact ==
The banning of Angaaray directly led to the formation of the All India Progressive Writers’ Association, which later attracted writers like Saadat Hasan Manto, Ismat Chughtai and Faiz Ahmed Faiz.

== Republication ==
In 1987 the microfilm of the book was found to have been preserved in the British Museum in London and was brought back to India by Qamar Rais, the head of the Urdu department of Delhi University. The stories were then edited by Khalid Alvi and the book was published as Angarey in Urdu by Educational Publishing House, Delhi, in 1995.

== Translation ==
The book has been translated into English twice. The first translation, "Angarey" printed by Rupa, is authored by Vibha S. Chauhan and Khalid Alvi. The second book titled "Angaaray" is translated by Snehal Shingavi, an academic at the University of Texas and printed by Penguin. Both books were released in 2014.
