= Randal Heymanson =

Australian journalist

Sir Randal Heymanson CBE
- Born: 18 April 1903; South Yarra, Melbourne
- Died: 27 August 1984 (aged 81); New York City
- Education: University of Melbourne; London School of Economics
- Occupation: Journalist
- Employer: Melbourne Herald

Sir Sydney Henry (Randal) Heymanson CBE (18 April 1903 – 27 August 1984) was an Australian journalist who had a long career as an international correspondent for The Herald and its affiliated Australian Newspapers Service, based at first in London and later in New York City.

== Early life and education ==
Sydney Henry Heymanson was born at South Yarra, Melbourne, Australia, in 1903. His parents were Frederick Leopold Heymanson and Bertha McDonnell Heymanson. His father worked as a commercial traveller.

After his early education at All Saints' Grammar School in East St Kilda and the Melbourne Church of England Grammar School, he was awarded a scholarship to the University of Melbourne, where he graduated with first-class honours in 1924. At university, he won prizes in history, political science, and political economy and was elected editor of the Melbourne University Magazine.

After finishing his university studies in Melbourne, Heymanson worked as a history master at his grammar school. In 1925, he was a founder and first editor of the University of Melbourne's student newspaper, Farrago. In 1926, he traveled to England, where he enrolled as a doctoral student at the London School of Economics and Political Science, studying under Arnold Toynbee. To support himself in London, he worked as a lecturer in the extension program of the University of London and as a reporter for The Herald, which had a staff in London.

== Career ==
Heymanson abandoned academia and turned his attention to journalism, becoming European correspondent for The Herald and the Australian Newspaper Service, as well as supplying articles to British newspapers. As an early commentator on the rising power of Adolf Hitler in Germany, he warned of the possible approach of war. In July 1939 he collaborated with Roy Lewis to start a newsletter called Vital News that they distributed confidentially to British and American government policymakers and bankers until December 1941.

In 1940, Heymanson, who was by then using the first name of "Randal", accepted Sir Keith Murdoch's invitation to start a New York bureau for The Herald's Australian Newspaper Service. Murdoch wanted to start a New York bureau because of his hope that the United States would enter World War II in support of the Allies and because he regarded connections with the United States as strategically important for Australia.

Heymanson was based in New York for the rest of his life. In addition to serving as editor and manager for the Australian News Service's New York bureau, he developed extensive networks of professional and personal connections in the United States. He was a member of the Foreign Press Association of New York, of which he was president in 1942–43, the White House Correspondents' Association, and the National Press Club of Washington. In 1946 he and Keith Murdoch participated in a meeting with U.S. business leaders that led in 1948 to the establishment of the American Australian Association for the purpose of fostering understanding and cooperation between the United States, Australia, and New Zealand. As one of the organisation's principal founders, he served the American Australian Association as a director from 1948 to 1984, vice-president from 1949 to 1965, president from 1966 to 1967, and chairman from 1967 to 1984. His leadership played a significant role in fostering opportunities for prominent businessmen, politicians and diplomats from Australia to interact with their American peers. Australian Prime Minister Sir Robert Menzies called him "the best informed Australian living in America".

He retired from his position as New York bureau chief for The Herald in 1969, but continued to contribute to The Herald and other members of the Australian Newspapers Service until his death in 1984.

== Honours and awards ==
In recognition of his services to Australian journalism and his contributions to fostering friendship and cooperation between the United States and Australia, in the Queen's Birthday Honours 1955 Heymanson was appointed an Officer of The Most Excellent Order of the British Empire for services in connection with Australian commercial relations with the United States of America and in promoting international commerce. In the New Year Honours 1965 Heymanson was promoted to Commander of The Most Excellent Order of the British Empire. In the New Year Honours 1972 Heymanson was appointed a Knight Bachelor.

== Death and legacy ==
Heymanson died in New York City on 27 August 1984. His ashes were returned to Australia. His large library was divided between Griffith University, which received approximately 20,000 volumes from his personal library, and the National Gallery of Victoria, which was given more than 25,000 volumes on western and oriental art, the history of costume and fashion, and the art of the book. He left a large financial endowment to the medical school of the University of Melbourne for the establishment and maintenance of the Sir Randal Heymanson Foundation, to be devoted to research on pain.
