= Yavar Abbas =

British-Indian soldier and cameraman (born 1920)

Captain Yavar Abbas
- Born: 15 December 1920 (age 105); Charkhari, British Raj
- Military career
- Allegiance: British India
- Branch: British Indian Army
- Service years: 1942–1947
- Rank: Captain
- Unit: 11th Sikh Regiment
- Conflicts: World War II: South East Asian Theatre; Burma Campaign

Captain Yavar Abbas (born 15 December 1920) is a British-Indian former soldier, filmmaker, broadcaster, writer, producer, and camera operator. He is a veteran of the Second World War and fought in the South-East Asian theatre for the British Indian Army. Later in his life, he worked as a cameraman for the BBC, and film producer. He is believed to be the oldest-living film director since the death of Francis Rigaud on 14 June 2026.

== Early life and military career ==
Abbas was born in Charkhari, British Raj on 15 December 1920. He was a student at Allahabad University studying Persian and English Literature and was also an Indian nationalist supporting the Quit India movement. When the Second World War broke out, Abbas enlisted as an officer in 1942 despite his nationalist leanings, because he did not want fascism to win. After training in Bangalore, he was commissioned as a 2nd lieutenant in the 11th Sikh Regiment. Due to disappointment with the regiment's garrison posting in West Bengal and dissatisfaction with his British fellow officers, whom Abbas described as a Dad's Army of "white, middle-aged men ... who still considered India to be a crown colony on which they'll have continuing control for the foreseeable future", he signed up as a combat cameraman after seeing an advert in the Army Gazette.

After receiving film training in Calcutta, Abbas joined the Fourteenth Army as a captain during the Burma campaign. He commented that the 14th Army felt completely different to the Sikh Regiment, saying: "It was wonderful camaraderie. There were British and Indians mixing with each other." He was present at the Battle of Imphal, Kohima and Mandalay. He also visited Hiroshima after the surrender of Japan. Following the end of the war, Abbas served as part of the British Commonwealth Occupation Force in Japan where he married a British officer in the Women's Auxiliary Air Force. During the partition of India, Abbas was transferred to the newly formed Pakistan Army. Despite calls from his brother, who was serving in the newly independent Indian Army, to join the Dominion of India, Abbas left the Pakistan Army for the United Kingdom. This was facilitated by Field Marshal Claude Auchinleck, who advised Abbas in Urdu: "Captain Abbas I think you better go to your susaraal (in-laws)."

== Later life ==
After moving to the United Kingdom, Abbas opened his own film company. He started specialising in filming works of William Shakespeare translated into Urdu. In 1964, he returned to India and filmed India, My India!, a series of four half-hour films, for which he won a Marconi Award in 1967. He also worked as a cameraman for BBC News. He married Indian activist and writer Noor Zaheer in 2020, when he was 100.

During the British commemorations of the 80th anniversary of VJ Day in 2025, Abbas, aged 104, was scheduled to make a statement about being one of the last veterans of the Asian front at the National Memorial Arboretum, but went off-script to pay tribute to King Charles III for attending despite undergoing cancer treatment.
