= Shabash Anarkali =

Shabash Anarkali (शाबाश अनारकली, شاباش انارکلی) is a Hindustani parody of the historical romance of Saleem and Anarkali set during the Mughal period in India. The play was written by Surinder Gulati, directed by Nadira Babbar (and others), and staged throughout India as well as on Doordarshan (Indian state television) in the late 1970s.

Although it aired on state-run television, the play came in for some criticism in the Parliament of India because it allegedly made disrespectful fun of Emperor Akbar, "a great and respected leader of this nation of ancient times." The play has received popular and critical acclaim since it first began to be staged.
