= Timothy Salter =

- Born: 1942 (age 83–84); Mexborough, Yorkshire, England
- Genres: Chamber, orchestral, instrumental, choral
- Occupations: Composer, conductor, pianist
- Instrument: Piano
- Labels: NMC Recordings, Regent Records (UK), Oboe Classics, SFZ music, Convivium Records, Usk Recordings
- Website: www.timothysalter.com

Timothy Salter (born in Mexborough, Yorkshire in 1942) is an English composer, conductor and pianist.

== Biography ==
Timothy Salter studied at St John's College, Cambridge, where he won the John Stewart of Rannoch Scholarship in sacred music. His piano teachers included York Bowen and Lamar Crowson. He has composed chamber and orchestral music, choral music and songs. He set up Usk Recordings in 1995 and is the musical director of the Ionian Singers.

His compositions include a Sinfonietta (1981) and a Symphony (1981), the saxophone concerto Chameleon (2008), and much chamber music, including three string quartets (1980, 1983, 2010), the Clarinet Quintet (2009), a Piano Quartet (2006), a Piano Quintet (1990), a Piano Trio (1987) and two piano sonatas (1961, 1989). Vocal works include the song cycles Four Hopkins Songs (1968), After the Sun (1988) and Life (1988).

He is co-author with Edward Lowbury and Alison Young of Thomas Campion, Poet, Composer, Physician.

For many years he taught composition and performance studies at the Royal College of Music, where he designed collaborative composer/performer courses and in conjunction with Edwin Roxburgh conducted the Twentieth Century Ensemble. He was awarded the Fellowship of the Royal College of Music in 2004 for services to music.
