= Edward Lowbury =

Edward Joseph Lister Lowbury OBE FRSL (12 December 1913 – 10 July 2007) was a pioneering and innovative English medical bacteriologist and pathologist, and also a published poet.

== Life ==
Edward Lowbury was born in Hampstead to the recently naturalised Benjamin William Loewenberg (of Latvian-Jewish background) and the Brazilian-born Alice Sarah Hallé (of German-Jewish origin) in 1913. The family name was anglicised to Lowbury at the start of World War 1. His father was a medical doctor and Edward’s middle names were chosen in honour of the surgeon Joseph Lister who had done so much to reduce post-operative infection. His son was to follow closely in Lister’s footsteps in the medical career that he eventually chose.

Lowbury’s secondary education was as a foundation scholar at St Paul’s School (London), where he began to specialise in science. He was also twice winner of the school’s Milton Prize – the first time for a sequence of 40 sonnets. Having won a science scholarship to University College, Oxford, he continued to take an interest in writing, gaining the 1934 Newdigate Prize and the 1937 Matthew Arnold Memorial essay prize.

His initial medical training was at the Royal London Hospital. He was called up to the Royal Army Medical Corps in 1943, where he specialised in pathology and was posted to Kenya. There he was one of the editors of the wartime literary magazine Equator. While still in service, his collection Crossing the Line was given first prize in a competition judged by Louis MacNeice and accepted for publication. On leaving the army, he took employment with the Common Cold Research Unit with James Lovelock as one of his colleagues. Those days are remembered in the last of Lowbury’s "Apocryphal Letters": Gaia – a letter to James Lovelock.

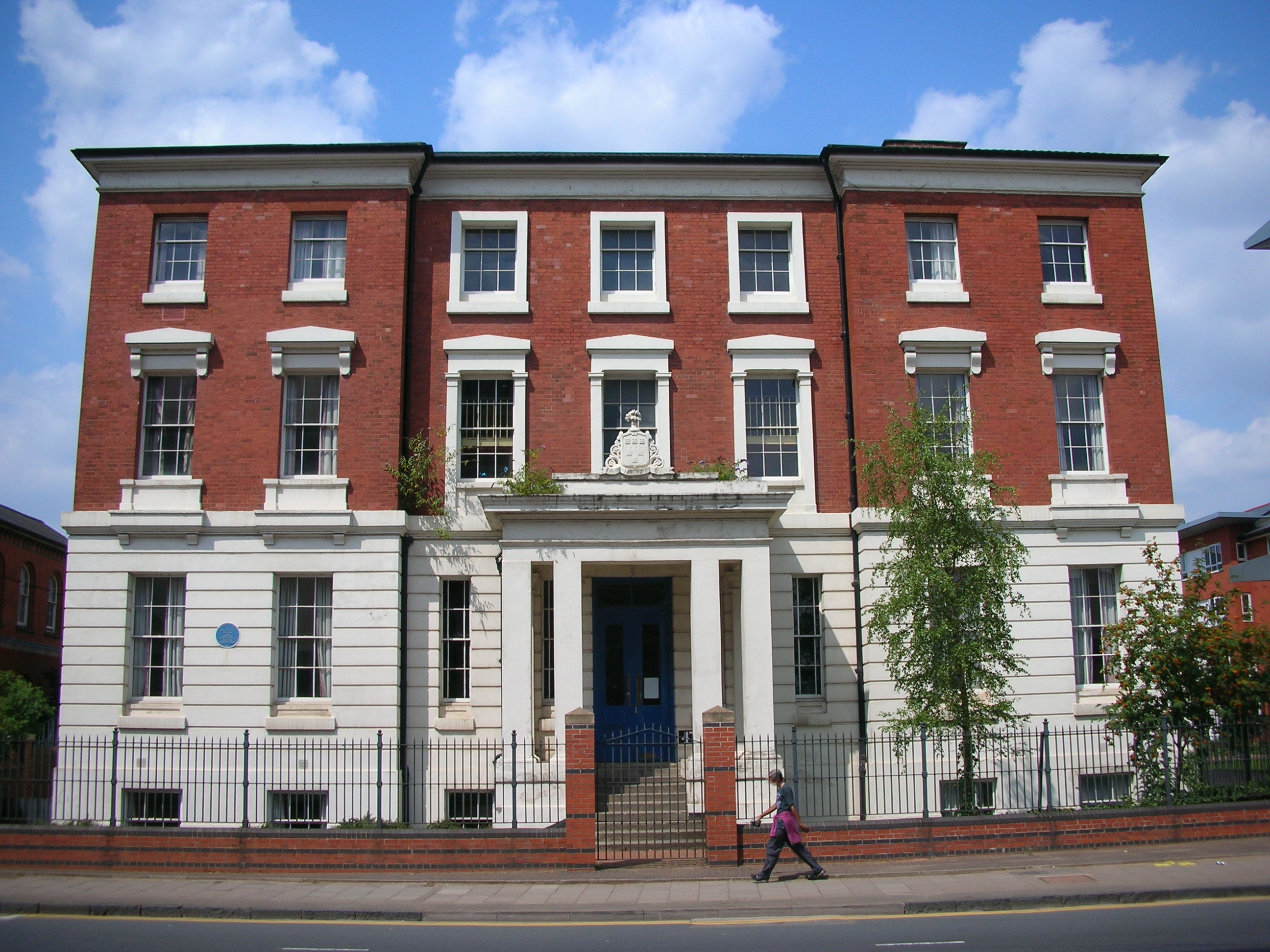
The former Accident Hospital, Bath Row, Birmingham

In 1949 Lowbury was appointed head of the microbiology department at the Medical Research Council burns unit of Birmingham Accident Hospital and also taught pathology as a Research Fellow at the University of Birmingham Medical School. As founder of the Hospital Infection Research Laboratory at what is now known as City Hospital, Birmingham in 1964, he emerged as one of the foremost researchers in hospital infection, particularly in the prevention of burns infection, the problems of antibiotic resistance and skin disinfection and lectured on his specialities throughout the world before retiring in 1979 and being awarded an OBE.

Through clinical trials Lowbury confirmed previous work showing that specialist positively pressurised dressing rooms reduced infections. With John Babb he proved that a specialised filter system could remove bacteria from an airstream and retain them, either reducing infection risk or allowing an already infected patient to be treated in an open ward. He documented treatment of infections with Pseudomonas aeruginosa, noting that the development of carbenicillin resistance used a single mechanism which conferred protection against a range of antibiotics. He further showed that overuse of a new antibiotic led to increased staphylococcus resistance, and that a subsequent reduction in use reversed the effect. His work with Rod Jones contributed to the development of a pseudomonas vaccine. With Harold Lilly he developed tests for effectiveness of hand washes before alcohol became the norm in 1974. These tests were still the basis for European standards when he died. He worked on topical antibacterial compounds with surgeons Douglas Jackson and Jack Cason, eventually leading to topical silver, which continues in use.

His findings were usefully summed up in the Everett Evans Lecture and the Wallace Memorial Lecture that he gave in the years immediately before his retirement in 1979. He then became a founder member of the Hospital Infection Society, of which he served as its first president and where an annual Lowbury Lecture was sponsored in his honour. Other honours included a D.Sc. at Aston University, where he was made Visiting Professor in Medical Microbiology; an LL.D at Birmingham University; Fellowships of the Royal Colleges of Surgeons, of Physicians and of Pathologists and membership of the New York Academy of Sciences.

In 1954 Lowbury had married Alison Young, daughter of the poet Andrew Young, with whom he had three daughters – Ruth (1955), Pauline (1956) and Miriam (1959). He also published regular collections of poetry: Time for Sale (1961), Daylight Astronomy (1968), Green Magic (for children, 1972), The Night Watchman (1974). His poetry was widely anthologised and in 1974 he was made a Fellow of the Royal Society of Literature. Following his retirement he continued to live (and write) in Birmingham until the death of his wife in 2001 and his deteriorating eyesight made it necessary to move to a nursing home in London.

== Poetry ==
Between 1936-85 Lowbury published seven commercial collections (and shared in two joint collections). Much of that work can be found in the following (which were followed by a new collection):

- Selected and New Poems 1935-1989 (Frome, 1990)
- Collected Poems (University of Salzburg, Austria, 1993)
- Mystic Bridge (Frome, 1997)

A considerable part of Lowbury’s poetic output appeared first in small press editions, from which he then drew for his more commercial collections. Pride of place goes to the nine publications from Roy Lewis' Keepsake Press, some quite substantial, such as Poetry & Paradox (1976) with its 19 poems and introductory essay, or Birmingham! Birmingham! (1985) with its 22. Comparable with these are Goldrush from Roger Pringle’s Celandine Press (Shipston-on-Stour, 1983), which has 19 titles of which one is a six-part sequence, and Variations from Aldeburgh from Peter Scupham’s Mandeville Press (Hitchin, 1987), which has 13 poems. Several of these books were made even larger by the number of illustrations that accompanied the poems: in the latter work there are eight line drawings by Donald Fairhall, while the three poems in Flowering Cypress from Kenneth Lindley’s Pointing Finger Press (Hereford, 1986) are supplemented by four of the artist’s woodcuts and a linoprint. Birmingham printers who used Lowbury’s work include F.E.Pardoe (The Ring, 1979) and David Wishart, whose Hayloft Press published a number of folded cards between 1987-97.

As a poet, Lowbury has been described as ‘a sort of missing link between the Georgians and The Movement’. His work, while remaining formal, avoided the mawkishness of the former and the attitudinising of the latter. Standing apart from literary fashions, he has a place among those of any age who continue to be read for having given lyrical expression to a striking or moving thought in plain and concise language. In this he resembled his father-in-law, Andrew Young, and Lowbury often explained that it was because he recognised Young’s mastery of what he himself wished to achieve in poetry that he first made contact with the older poet.

The originality of the best of his poetry is on a par with that of his scientific work; it was achieved by rejecting the conventional and appealing to reason. But his scepticism was leavened with humour and appreciation of paradox, in which he found the stuff of poetry. One aspect of this, as the critic Glyn Pursglove has pointed out, was his play on words and subtle use of allusion. He also had (in life as in art) a narrative gift which particularly relished the offbeat and macabre.

== Other work ==
Some 220 (often jointly authored) contributions to scientific and medical journals, textbooks, encyclopaedias, etc., appeared between 1943-79. There were also two larger works of reference written in collaboration with Graham Ayliffe et al:

- Drug Resistance in Antimicrobial Therapy, with G.A.J.Ayliffe (Springfield, Illinois, 1974)
- Control of Hospital Infection: A Practical Handbook, with G.A.J. Ayliffe, A.M. Geddes and J.D.Williams (London, 1975; revised editions in 1981, 1992)

Lowbury’s bibliography also includes, besides poetry and medical works, two biographies: Thomas Campion poet, composer, physician (with Timothy Salter and Alison Young, London and New York, 1970) and To Shirk No Idleness, a biography of his father-in-law Andrew Young (with Alison Young, London, 1997). He and his wife had also brought out an edition of The Poetical Works of Andrew Young (London, 1985) and a Selected Poems (Manchester 1998). In the latter part of his career, Lowbury had given a number of lectures on literary themes to learned societies; these were eventually collected, along with a few essays, in Hallmarks of Poetry (University of Salzburg, 1994). One, the 1987 Tredegar Lecture to the Royal Society of Literature on "Medical Poets", eventually led him to compile his anthology of doctor poets (Apollo, London 1990).

== The Place of Music ==
Lowbury grew up surrounded by appreciation of music and regularly played the piano himself until almost the end of his life. He married a teacher of music and his two younger daughters became professional musicians. The eldest recalls his enthusiasm on discovering a new composer and the way he would play their records over and over. Lowbury himself recounted in an interview how, ‘When I was a student, somebody played me a record of Tapiola, the great sound-poem of Sibelius, and I was so overwhelmed by this that I couldn’t listen to any other music for a time.’ Soon after he wrote his own "Tapiola" and received enthusiastic permission from the composer to dedicate the poem to him.

Soon after arriving in the city, he became a founder member of the Birmingham Chamber Music Society. He also went regularly to the Aldeburgh Festival, at one session of which he gave a talk on Thomas Campion. Out of these visits grew the poems collected in Variations on Aldeburgh. What had intrigued Lowbury about Thomas Campion was that he too combined medical practice with poetry and musicianship. In 1970 he co-authored a biography of Campion with his wife and the composer Timothy Salter. On a much smaller scale, he gave an account of his father’s former patient, the avant-garde composer Bernard van Dieren, in one of his "Apocryphal Letters".

Another result of the co-operation with Timothy Salter was a setting of five Lowbury poems in his cantata "Against the Light" (1971) followed by two other settings in the next decade. During the 1980s there were further settings by two other composers teaching at Birmingham University, Ivor Keys and John Joubert, as well as by David Haines.
