= Noor Zaheer =

Indian feminist author

- Occupation: Feminist
- Parent(s): Sajjad Zaheer (father); Razia Sajjad Zaheer (mother)

Noor Zaheer is an Indian left-leaning feminist author. Zaheer is member of Delhi Urdu Academy, chaired by Arvind Kejriwal.

== Literary career ==
Noor Zaheer, through her short stories and literature, focuses on socioeconomic issues in a legacy to that of the 20th century’s progressive Urdu authors. Zaheer translated Iṣmat Cug̲h̲tāʼī's Urdu memoir Kaghzi Hai Pairahan to 'The Paper Attire' in English and also directed a play 'Kahani Ki Kahani, Ismat Ki Zabaani' in a theatre fest at Lucknow in 2017.

== Social work ==
Zaheer contributes to documentation of oral culture and restoration of Buddhist monasteries in Himachal Pradesh, India.

She married former British Indian Army officer and filmographer Yavar Abbas in 2020, when he was 100.

== Bibliography ==
- Z̤ahīr, Nūr. My God is a Woman. India, Vitasta Pub., 2008. ISBN 9788189766528
- Z̤ahīr, Nūr. Ret Par Khoon. India, Meghā Buksa, 2010.
- Z̤ahīr, Nūr. Denied by Allah: Angst Against the Archaic Laws of Halala, Triple Talaq, Mut'ah & Khula. India, Vitasta Publishing, 2015.
- Z̤ahīr, Nūr. Siyahi ki ek boond. India, Medhā Buksa, 2018.
- Z̤ahīr, Nūr. Surk̲h̲a kāravām̐ ke hamasafara. India, Medhā Buksa, 2008.
- सयानी दीवानी. India, Rādhākr̥shṇa Prakāśana Prā. Li., 2020.
- Zaheer, Noor, and Ẓahīr, Nūr. Āja ke nāma. India, Medhā Buksa, 2012.
- Zaheer, Noor. Apna Khuda Ek Aurat. India, HarperCollins Publishers India, 2015.
- Zaheer, Noor. The Language They Chose Vol. I: Women's Writing in Urdu Vol I: Fiction. India, 'Zubaan Books, 2017.
- Zaheer, Noor. The Language They Chose Vol. II: Women's Writing in Urdu Vol II: Non-Fiction. India, 'Zubaan Books, 2017.
- Koofi, Fawzia, and Zaheer, Noor. Lettres à mes filles - Entre survie et espoir, les combats de la première femme politique afghane. France, Michel Lafon, 2022.
- Cug̲h̲tāʼī, ʻIṣmat. (Translator:Zaheer, Noor) Paper Attire. Pakistan, Oxford University Press, 2016.
