= Twilight in Delhi =

1940 novel by Ahmed Ali

- Title page for Twilight in Delhi (1940)
- Author: Ahmed Ali
- Original title: Twilight in Delhi
- Language: English
- Publisher: Hogarth Press (Britain)
- Publication date: 1940 (first edition)
- Publication place: British India
- Media type: Print

Twilight in Delhi is Ahmed Ali's first novel, originally published in English by the Hogarth Press in Britain in 1940. The novel addresses India changing social, political, and cultural climate following colonialism.

== Plot summary ==
The novel is set around 1911 to 1919 in Delhi. Ahmed Ali has vividly drawn the picture of old Delhi and its Muslim inhabitants of that era. He depicts the themes of disintegration, degeneration, alienation, gender and social conflicts, nostalgia, the downfall of the Mughal emperors, and the effects of colonialism and imperialism on Indian Muslims in Delhi.

The novel is shot through with rich symbolic imagery. The palm tree, the henna plant, dogs, cats and pigeons refer not only to the behaviors of characters but also the whole Muslim society. The novel starts at dawn, with "twilight" referring to the rise of the sun as well as the rise of the protagonist Mir Nihal's living standards. By contrast, descriptions of twilight at evening in the closing sentences portray the overall downfall and destruction of not only the family of Mir Nihal but also the Mughal Empire altogether.

The novel was not published until after the intervention of the prominent English writer E. M. Forster.
