= Vernon Scannell =

English writer and poet

- Vernon Scannell
- Born: John Vernon Bain; 23 January 1922; Spilsby, Lincolnshire, England
- Died: 16 November 2007 (aged 85); West Yorkshire, England
- Education: University of Leeds
- Occupation: Writer
- Spouse: Jo Higson (Painter)
- Partner: none
- Children: 6
- Writing career
- Language: English
- Subjects: Poetry, English

Vernon Scannell (23 January 1922 – 16 November 2007) was a British poet and author. He was at one time a professional boxer, and wrote novels about the sport of boxing. He was a famous poet of English.

== Life ==
Vernon Scannell, whose birth name was' John Vernon Bain', was born in 1922 in Spilsby, Lincolnshire. The family, always poor, moved frequently, including Ballaghaderreen in Ireland, Beeston, and Eccles, before settling in Buckinghamshire. Bain spent most of his youth growing up in Aylesbury in Buckinghamshire. His father had fought in World War I, and came to make a living as a commercial photographer. Scannell attended the local Queen's Park Boys' School, an elementary council school. He left school at the age of 14 to work as a clerk in an insurance office. His real passions, however, were for the unlikely combination of boxing and literature. He had been winning boxing titles at school and had been a keen reader from a very early age, although not properly attached to poetry until about 15 years old, when he picked up a Walter de la Mare poem and was "instantly and permanently hooked". He frequently read both the poetry of Thomas Hardy and the thrillers of Edgar Wallace.

Scannell enlisted in the army "as a lark" in 1940, shortly after war was declared. He joined the Argyll and Sutherland Highlanders, and two years later was transferred to the Gordon Highlanders, a part of the 51st Highland Division. The war took him into action in the North African desert. He fought at El Alamein and across the western desert during the Eighth Army's drive to reach Tunisia. Following an assault on an Axis-held hill near Gabes, he watched as his Gordon Highlanders moved through the recently taken position, looting the dead, both Allied and Axis. Revolted, he walked away. He was caught and court-martialled for deserting a forward area. Sentenced to three years' imprisonment, he spent six months in one of the harshest military penal institutions in Alexandria before being released on a suspended sentence to take part in the Normandy landings. His war ended when he was shot in both legs while on night patrol near Caen. He was shipped back to a military hospital at Winwick in Lancashire before being sent to a convalescent depot. Scannell had always very much disliked army life, finding nothing in his temperament that fitted him for the part of a soldier. Following the end of the war in Europe (V.E. Day) he deserted again. He spent two years on the run, earning his living with jobs in the theatre, professional boxing bouts, and tutoring and coaching, all the while teaching himself by reading everything he could. During this evasive time, Scannell was writing poetry and was first published in Tribune and The Adelphi. He was also boxing for Leeds University, winning the Northern Universities Championships at three weights. In 1947, he was arrested and court-martialled and sent to Northfield Military Hospital, a mental institution near Birmingham. On discharge, he returned to Leeds and then went to London, where, supporting himself with teaching jobs and boxing, he settled down to writing.

Scannell, a fellow of the Royal Society of Literature, won many poetry awards, including for war poems such as his collection Walking Wounded. A. E. Housman said that "the business of poetry is to harmonise the sadness of the universe" and Scannell quoted this with approval. Scannell's poems, with their themes of love, violence, and mortality, were shaped and influenced by his wartime experiences. Scannell was awarded a Writing Fellowship in 1975 as Resident Poet in Berinsfield, Oxfordshire, an experience he recounts in A Proper Gentleman and later, in 1979 he spent a term as Poet in Residence at the King's School, Canterbury. His final collection, Last Post, was published in 2007; he had been working on it until not long before his death.

Scannell married the painter Josephine Higson, who survives him, along with four of their six children.

== Literary life ==
He received the Heinemann Award for Literature in 1961 for an early poetry volume, The Masks of Love, and the Cholmondeley Award for poetry in 1974. He was elected a Fellow of the Royal Society of Literature in 1960 and granted a Civil List pension in recognition of his services to literature in 1981. Stephen Spender wrote to Scannell in a letter in 1953: "you write good poetry and that is all that matters". Seamus Heaney in a letter to Andrew Taylor said he admired Scannell's poems "not only for their sturdy metrical pace and structure, but for their combination of mordancy and a sense of mortality". John Carey, the critic, commented: "Scannell nearly always works on two levels, one realistic and external, the other imaginative, metaphorical, haunted by memory and desire. A master of the dramatic monologue, his work is drenched in humanity. It resounds with memories." Scannell also wrote the verse narration for BBC Television film A House that Died.

He also received a special award from the Wilfred Owen Association "in recognition of his contribution to war poetry". Scannell's best-known book of war poetry is Walking Wounded (1965). The title poem recollects a column of men returning from battle: "No one was suffering from a lethal hurt, They were not magnified by noble wounds, There was no splendour in that company."

Scannell is also the author of a memoir, The Tiger and the Rose (1983). The unadorned narrative covers five years' military service and a brief boxing career. Scannell writes about the conclusion to his army life, "Twenty-five years ago, 1945...was the year I made what might seem like a desperate decision and performed what might appear to be an act of criminal folly, manic selfishness, zany recklessness, abject cowardice or even, perhaps, eccentric courage. I deserted from the Army." The first recipient of the Owen Award, Christopher Logue, author of some of the best war poetry of the past half-century (in the form of versions of the Iliad), spent two years in a military prison, on a charge of handling stolen passbooks. What would Owen say? He'd say: Never trust the teller, trust the tale."

Historian Martin Johnes has used Scannell's 1951 novel The Fight to explore racial attitudes in 1950s Britain. He argues that its depictions of reactions to a black boxer illustrate the diversity of racial attitudes, including outright racism, better than contemporary sociological studies where private assumptions and thoughts were hidden.

In Paul Fussell's classic The Great War and Modern Memory, Scannell's work figures crucially. The book's culminating chapter concludes with Fussell's discussion of "a relation Vernon Scannell once hinted between history and one's personal memories of war," whereby such memories are "transformed utterly into what Northrop Frye calls 'the total cultural form of our present life'."

== Death ==
Scannell spent the final years of his life living in Otley, West Yorkshire, where he died at his home at the age of 85 after a long illness.

== Works ==
=== Poetry ===
- Graves and Resurrections (1948), poems
- The Wound and The Scar (Peter Nevill, 1953)
- A Mortal Pitch (Villiers, 1957), poems
- The Masks of Love (Putnam, 1960), poems
- A Sense of Danger (Putnam, 1962), poems
- New Poems 1962: A P. E. N. Anthology (Hutchinson, 1962), editor with Patricia Beer and Ted Hughes
- The Dividing Night (Putnam, 1962)
- Edward Thomas (1963)
- The Loving Game (1965), poems
- Walking Wounded – Poems 1962–65 (1965)
- Pergamon Poets 8 (1970), with Jon Silkin
- Epithets of War – Poems 1965–69 (Eyre & Spottiswoode, 1969)
- The Dangerous Ones (Elsevier, 1970)
- Mastering the Craft (Pergamon Press, 1970)
- Selected Poems (Allison & Busby, 1971)
- Company of Women (Sceptre Press, 1971)
- Incident at West Bay, a poem (The Keepsake Press, 1972)
- The Winter Man (Allison & Busby, 1973)
- Wish You Were Here (1973), broadsheet poem
- Meeting in Manchester (1974)
- The Apple-Raid and Other Poems (Chatto & Windus, 1974)
- Three Poets, Two Children: Leonard Clark, Vernon Scannell, Dannie Abse, Answer Questions by Two Children (1975)
- A Morden Tower Reading (1976) poems, with Alexis Lykiard
- Not Without Glory: Poets of the Second World War (Woburn Press, 1976), editor
- Of Love And Music (Mapletree, 1979), poems
- Loving Game: Poems (Robson Books, 1979)
- New & Collected Poems 1950–1980 (Robson Books, 1980)
- Nettles (Robson Books, 1980; as part of New & Collected Poems 1950–1980)
- Catch the Light (1982), poems, with Gregory Harrison and Laurence Smith
- Winterlude: Poems (Robson Books, 1982)
- Funeral Games and Other Poems (Robson Books, 1987)
- Sporting Literature (Oxford, 1987), editor, anthology
- The Clever Potato – A Feast of Poetry for Children (Red Fox, 1988)
- Soldiering On. Poems of Military Life (Robson Books, 1989)
- Love Shouts and Whispers (Red Fox, 1990)
- A Time for Fires (Robson Books, 1991), poems
- Travelling Light (Bodley Head, 1991)
- The Black and White Days (Robson Books, 1996), poems
- Collected Poems, 1950–93 (Robson Books, 1998)
- Feminine Endings (Enitharmon Press, 2000), poems
- Views and Distances (Enitharmon Press, 2000), poems
- Of Love & War: New and Selected Poems (Robson Books, 2002)
- Incendiary
- The Gunpowder Plot
- House for Sale
- Moods of Rain
- A Case of Murder poems
- Uncle Albert
- Hide and Seek
- Last Post (Shoestring Press, 2007), ISBN 978-1-904886-67-9
- A Place to Live (The Happy Dragons' Press, 2007)
- Death of a Snow Man
- They Did Not Expect This
- The death of a snowman

=== Autobiography ===
- The Tiger and the Rose (Hamish Hamilton, 1972)
- An Argument of Kings (Parkwest, 1987)
- A Proper Gentleman (Robson Books, 1977)
- Drums of Morning – Growing up in the Thirties (Robson Books, 1992)

=== Fiction ===
- The Fight (Peter Nevill, 1953), novel
- The Big Chance (John Long, 1960), novel
- The Face of the Enemy (Putnam, 1961), novel
- The Shadowed Place (1961), novel
- The Big Time (Longmans, 1965), novel
- Ring of Truth (Robson Books, 1983), novel

=== Other ===
- How to Enjoy Novels (Piatkus Books, 1984)
- How To Enjoy Poetry (Piatkus Books, 1983)
- A House that Died Verse narration to BBC TV film

== Sources ==
- Bierman, John; Smith, Colin (2002). Alamein : War Without Hate. London, England: Viking.
