= Nadira Babbar =

Indian theatre actress, director and actress

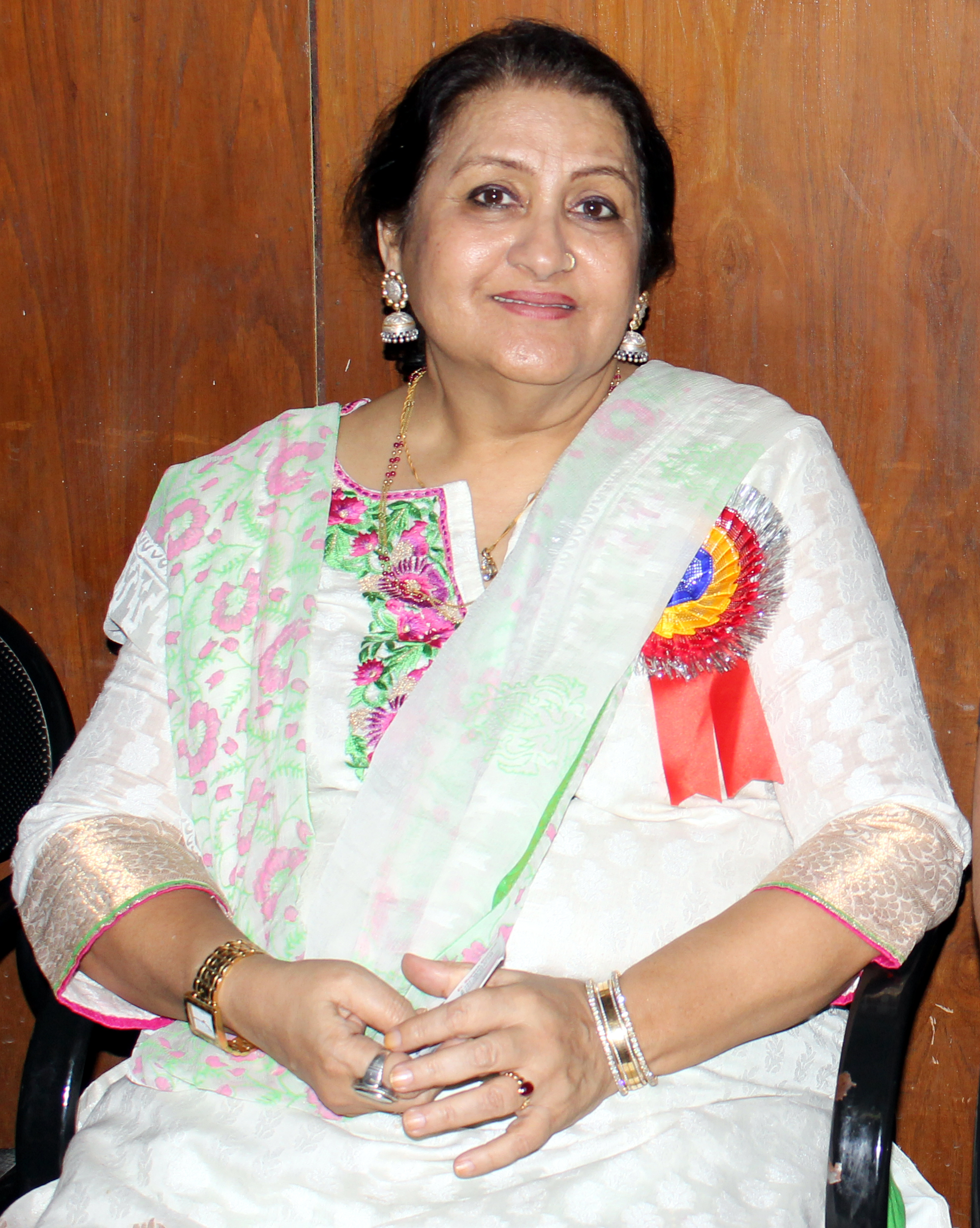
- Babbar at Bharat Bhavan, Bhopal in May 2016
- Born: 20 January 1948 (age 78); Bombay, Bombay Province, India
- Occupations: Theater actress, director
- Years active: 1980–present
- Spouse: Raj Babbar
- Children: Arya Babbar; Juhi Babbar
- Parent(s): Sajjad Zaheer (father); Razia Sajjad Zaheer (mother)

Nadira Babbar (born 20 January 1948) is an Indian theatre actress, director and an actress in Hindi cinema, who is the recipient of Sangeet Natak Akademi Award in 2001. Nadira founded a Mumbai-based theatre group called Ekjute, a known name in Hindi theatre, in 1981.

Nadira Babbar played mother to Aishwarya Rai's character in Gurinder Chadha's Bride and Prejudice (2004), and M. F. Hussain's Meenaxi: A Tale of Three Cities (2004). She also portrayed the mother of Salman Khan's character in Sohail Khan's Jai Ho and the mother of Raj Bansal (main villain) in Sunny Deol's 2016 movie Ghayal Once Again.

== Early life ==
The daughter of Sajjad Zaheer and Razia Sajjad Zaheer, she graduated from National School of Drama (NSD), New Delhi in 1971. Nadira was a gold medallist at NSD and went to Germany on a scholarship, and later got a chance to work with renowned directors like Jerzy Grotowski and Peter Brook.

== Career ==
She started her theatre group Ekjute (Together) in 1981 in Delhi, which came out with its first production Yahudi Ki Ladki in 1981, which revived the Parsi theatre style, and is considered one of its finest. The group has also been performing the Bhavai-based musical, Jasma Odhan, written by Shanta Gandhi for several years now. Nadira moved to Mumbai in 1988, and reestablished her theatre group.

Over the last 30 years, Ekjute has staged over 60 plays, including Sandhya Chhaya, Look Back in Anger, Ballabpur Ki Roop Katha, Baat Laat Ki Halaat Ki, Bharam Ke Bhoot, Shabash Anarkali and Begum Jaan; apart from directing plays written by herself: Dayashankar Ki Diary (1997), Sakku Bai (1999), Suman Aur Sana and Ji Jaisi Aapki Marzi. It has worked with actors like Raj Babbar, Satish Kaushik and Kirron Kher.

In 1990, Ekjute started the 'Ekjute Young People's Theatre Group', which has given productions like Aao Picnic Challen and Azdak Ka Insaaf. The groups celebrated 30 years of its foundation in 2011, with a week-long theatre festival, 30 Years Caravan 2011, at Prithvi Theatre, Mumbai, which began on 14 April 2011. She also appeared in Salman Khan-starrer Hindi movie Jai Ho (2014).

In 2016, she featured in Sunny Deol's Ghayal Once Again.

Nadira Babbar was recently seen in the web series, The Married Woman, directed by Sahir Raza. The star cast also includes Ridhi Dogra and Monica Dogra.

== Personal life ==
She is married to Indian Hindi and Punjabi film actor and politician Raj Babbar. Actors Arya Babbar and Juhi Babbar are their children. She is also step-mother to actor Prateik Babbar, Raj Babbar's son from his marriage with Smita Patil.

== Awards ==
- Newsmakers Achievers Awards 2022

== See also ==
- Theatre in India
