= Qaumi Jang =

Urdu newspaper

Qaumi Jang (Urdu: قومی جنگ, 'People's War') was an Urdu language weekly newspaper published by the Communist Party of India from Bombay during World War II. It was founded in 1942 as the Urdu edition of People's War. Qaumi Jang was the central party organ in Urdu.

When Qaumi Jang was launched, a number of Muslim socialist writers moved to Bombay to work at the paper. Sajjad Zaheer, who had recently been released from jail, shifted to Bombay to become the editor of Qaumi Jang. Sibte Hassan was one of the Muslim intellectuals who came to Bombay to work as a Qaumi Jang staffer, serving as the assistant editor of the paper. Ashraf Ali Khan was a member of the Qaumi Jang staff. Saadat Hasan Manto was one of the writers for Qaumi Jang. Some of Manto's most notable short stories were published in Qaumi Jang, such as Kaali Shalwar, Dhuan and Bu.

Another Urdu poet, Kaifi Azmi arrived in Bombay in 1943 to begin writing for Qaumi Jang. The newspaper became known for covering the Bengal famine of 1943 through photographs by Sunil Janah and sketches by Chittaprosad.

On 26 May 1945, the Government of the United Provinces issued a ban the sale and distribution of People's War, Qaumi Jang and Lok Yudh under the Defence of India Rules, citing that the newspapers had published to many biased reports.

After the end of World War II, Qaumi Jang ceased publication in November 1945, transitioning to People’s Age Naya Zamana ('New Age') as the new Urdu language central party organ. After 1945, the CPI had to navigate the consequences of its "People's War" policy, which had alienated it from the mainstream Indian National Congress and the mainstream national movement, as the CPI had opposed the 1942 Quit India Movement and supported the British war effort after Soviet Union was under attack.
