= Razia Sajjad Zaheer =

Indian writer

- Born: Razia Dilshad; 15 October 1918; Ajmer, Ajmer State, British India
- Died: 18 December 1979 (aged 61); Delhi, India
- Resting place: VIP Graveyard, Jamia Millia Islamia, Delhi
- Citizenship: Indian
- Education: Allahabad University
- Occupations: Writer, translator
- Spouse: Sajjad Zaheer
- Children: 4, including Nadira Babbar and Noor Zaheer
- Writing career
- Language: Urdu
- Period: 1948–1979
- Notable works: Allah De Banda Le, Nehru ka Bhatija and Galileo
- Movements: Progressive Writers Association and Afro-Asian Writers' Movement
- Website: Sajjad Zaheer Digital Archive

Razia Sajjad Zaheer (15 October 1918 – 18 December 1979) was an Indian writer in the Urdu language, a translator, and a prominent member of the Progressive Writers Association. She won the Uttar Pradesh Sahitya Akademi Award as well as the Soviet Land Nehru Award.

== Early life ==
Razia Dilshad was born in Ajmer, Rajasthan on 15 October 1918 in an academic family. Her father was the principal of Ajmer Islamia College. She received an undergraduate degree in Ajmer.

She married Sajjad Zaheer, a poet and communist activist when she was 20. He was one of the founders of the Progressive Writers Association (PWA) and was not interested in pursuing a career in law that he had trained for. Shortly after their marriage, he was arrested by the British for his revolutionary activities and imprisoned for two years.

Razia obtained a postgraduate degree from Allahabad University. In the 1940s, Razia and her husband were in Bombay, where they were active in the cultural sphere, organising weekly PWA soirees. She acknowledged the influence of the PWA in radicalising her politics, and was among the activist women who were beginning to question "Gandhian ideologies of women's nature and place."

By 1948, Razia had four daughters, and her husband was in Pakistan at the behest of the Communist Party of India, which had supported the Partition of India. She moved to Lucknow with her daughters.

== Career ==
Razia had been contributing short stories to journals like Phool, Tehzib-e-Nisvaan and Ismat since her childhood. In Lucknow, Razia began to teach, write and translate in order to earn a living. She translated about 40 books into Urdu. Her translation of Bertold Brecht's Life of Galileo to Urdu was called powerful. She translated Siyaram Sharan Gupta's Nari (published as Aurat (Woman) by Sahitya Akademi), and Mulk Raj Anand's Saat Saal (Seven Years, 1962).

In 1953, her novella Sar-e-Sham (Early in the Evening) was published, Kante (Thorns, a novel) was released in 1954, while Suman (another novel) came out in 1964. She edited and published Nuqush-e-Zindan (1954), which comprised her husband's letters to her from prison.

She worked on a novel on the poet Majaz Lucknowi, which remained unfinished. Along with her literary endeavours, she also edited and copied her husband's writings.

Her short stories have been characterised as having a socialistic purpose. For example, in Neech (Lowborn) she explored class differences between a privileged woman and a fruit-seller, and the prejudices the former has to set aside to obtain strength from the latter. Moreover, given the revolutionary ideology of the PWA, her works - as those of her colleagues in the group - explored gender relations and women's oppression by men and other women, the development of a modernist identity among women, as well as the more deleterious effects of poverty and ostracism on marginalised women.

Zard Gulab (The Yellow Rose, 1981) and Allah De Banda Le (God gives, Man takes, 1984) were two of her short story collections published posthumously.

== Later life ==
Razia's husband was in prison in Pakistan until 1956, whereupon he returned to India and joined his family in Lucknow. In 1964, they moved to Delhi. Sajjad died in USSR in 1973.

Razia Sajjad Zaheer died in Delhi on 18 December 1979.

== Bibliography ==
The literary work of Razia Sajjad Zaheer include:

- Sar-e-Sham (1953)
- Kaante (1954)
- Suman (1963)
- Ẓahīr, Raz̤Iyyah Sajjād (1973). Allah Megh De. Maktaba jamia new delhi. ISBN 978-81-7587-511-1.
- Zard Gulaab (1981)
- Allah De Banda Le (1984)
- Nehru ka Bhateeja (1954)
- Sultan Zainul Abidin Budshah

== Awards and honours ==
- Soviet Land Nehru Award (1966).
- Uttar Pradesh Sahitya Akademi Award (1972).

== Bibliography ==
- Gopal, Priyamvada (2005). Literary Radicalism in India: Gender, Nation and the Transition to Independence. Psychology Press. ISBN 978-0-415-32904-0.
- Gopal, Priyamvada (2009). The Indian English Novel: Nation, History, and Narration. Oxford University Press. ISBN 978-0-19-954437-0.
- Husain, S. Ehtesham (1963). "Urdu Literature—1962". Indian Literature. 6 (2). JSTOR 23329422.
- Husain, S. Ehtesham (1972). "Urdu Literature—1971". Indian Literature. 15 (4): 142–149. JSTOR 24157192.
- Machwe, Prabhakar (1977). "Prominent Women Writers In Indian Literature After Independence". Journal of South Asian Literature. 12 (3/4): 145–149. JSTOR 40872164.
- Mahmood, Nazir (5 January 2020a). "Raziya, Shaukat, and the PWA - Part I". The News International.
- Mahmood, Nazir (6 January 2020b). "Raziya, Shaukat, and the PWA - Part II". The News International.
- Naeem, Raza (18 December 2019). "Razia Sajjad Zaheer: The forgotten virtuoso of Urdu literature". The Express Tribune.
- Rao, D. S. (2004). Five Decades: The National Academy of Letters, India: A Short History of Sahitya Akademi. Sahitya Akademi. ISBN 978-81-260-2060-7.
- "Razia Sajjad Zaheer". Who's Who of Indian Writers. Delhi: Sahitya Akademi. 1961.
- Salman, Peerzada (29 November 2018). "All about mother". Dawn.
- Singh, V. P. (2006). "Emerging From the Veil: A Study of Selected Muslim Women's Feminist Writing From the Indian Subcontinent". In Prasad, Amar Nath; Joseph, S. John Peter (eds.). Indian Writing In English: Critical Ruminations Part 2. Sarup & Sons. ISBN 978-81-7625-725-1.
- Tharu, Susie J.; Lalita, K., eds. (1993). Women Writing in India: The twentieth century. Feminist Press at CUNY. ISBN 978-1-55861-029-3.
