= Roy Lewis (writer) =

English writer (1913–1996)

- Born: 6 November 1913; Felixstowe, England, U.K.
- Died: 9 October 1996 (aged 82)
- Education: King Edward's School; University College, Oxford; London School of Economics
- Occupations: Writer and small-press printer
- Spouse: Christine Tew (m. 1939)
- Children: Two

Ernest Michael Roy Lewis (6 November 1913 – 9 October 1996) was an English writer, a novelist of alternative histories and a small-press printer.

== Early life and education ==
Although born in Felixstowe, Lewis was brought up in Birmingham and educated at King Edward's School. After studying at University College, Oxford, earning a Bachelor of Arts degree in 1934, he went on to study at the London School of Economics.

== Career ==
He began his career as an economist but, after serving as an editor on the journal The Statist, he became interested in journalism. He took a sabbatical in 1938 to travel to Australia and India.

Beginning in July 1939, he collaborated with Randal Heymanson to produce a newsletter called Vital News that they distributed confidentially to British and American government policymakers and bankers until December 1941.

From 1943 to 1946, he worked for the Peking Syndicate, a firm specialising in investments in China, but left to work as a journalist for the weekly Scope during 1946-8. Between 1952-61 he served as Washington, D.C. correspondent for The Economist, then settled full-time in England in 1961, where he became a feature writer for The Times, remaining with the newspaper until he retired in 1971.

In 1957, he had founded the Keepsake Press, initially to hand-print family ephemera. He soon began serious, though small-scale, production and by the time infirmity forced him to discontinue in 1990 he had brought out over a hundred titles.

== Fiction ==
The majority of the books that Lewis wrote or edited, often jointly, were non-fiction and closely related to his journalism. However, he is best known for his 1960 novel The Evolution Man, which went through six editions under a number of titles. This comic fiction purports to be a first-hand account by the son of the first man to discover fire. To prevent further "advances", the family takes matters in hand, leading to a conclusion given away by the book's eventual subtitle, "How I ate my father". Though the book was marketed as science fiction, Lewis demurred that his true intention was to write "something between a parable and a fantasy". Much later, the story line of the 2015 film Animal Kingdom: Let's Go Ape was loosely based on the book.)

Continuing authorship into old age, Lewis published a second novel in 1990, The Extraordinary Reign of King Ludd: An Historical Tease, which took as its preliminary premise that Queen Victoria abdicated in 1849, following the triumph of International Socialism in Europe. Its tendency is reflected by the alternative titles given its French and Italian translations, "The True History of the Last Socialist King". Two other fictions followed, A Walk with Mr Gladstone (1991) and Cock of the Walk: A Mid-Victorian Rumpus (1995), both provocative reinterpretations of that era

Another speculative departure was provided by his one-man play, Shakespeare Speaks (Keepsake Press, 1989) in which the author expresses his indignation at the unauthorised publication of his sonnets and explains their real concealed story. The play was performed in the following year at the Edinburgh Festival Fringe.

== Personal life ==
Lewis married Christine Tew in 1939, after returning to England from abroad, and with her had two daughters. He died in London on 9 October 1996.

== Bibliography ==
- Shall I Emigrate? – A Practical Guide (with the assistance of Arthur Frazer, 1948)
- The English Middle Classes (with Angus Maude, UK 1949, US 1950, reprinted to 1973)
- The Visitor's Book: England and the English as Others Have Seen Them, A. D. 1500 to 1950 (edited with Harry Ballam), dedicated to: "Ahmed Ali who brought us together in his own country (India), and whose failure to record his impressions of ours is simply inexcusable", Max Parrish, London, 1950
- Professional People (with Angus Maude, 1952)
- Sierra Leone: A Modern Portrait (1954, H.M.Stationery Office, re-editions to 1957)
- Colonial Development and Welfare, 1946–55 (H.M.Stationery Office, 1956)
- The Boss: The Life and Times of the British Business Man (with Rosemary Stewart, 1958); revised and enlarged edition, 1960, U.S. title, The Managers: a new examination of the English, German and American executive (1961)
- The Death of God, a Curious Narrative Dream Dreamed By Roy Lewis in the Year MCMXLIII (1943) When He Was Living in Dibrugarh in Assam and on Waking Recollected and Written Down By Him (Keepsake Press, 1959)
- What We Did to Father (1960); reprints: 1963 (as The Evolution Man, Penguin), 1968 (as Once Upon an Ice Age), 1979, 1989 (Corgi), 1993 (as The Evolution Man, or How I Ate My Father), 1994 (USA)); translated into French by Rita Barisse, Italian, Spanish, German and Czech under various titles (1990) and frequently reprinted
- The British in Africa (with Yvonne Foy, 1971) – American title: Painting Africa White: The Human Side of British Colonialism
- The Times Map of the Tribes, Peoples, and Nations of Modern Africa (compiled with Yvonne Foy, 1972)
- The Practice of Parlour Printing Considered as a Specific Against Insomnia and Like Disorders with a Warning on Side Effects Illustrated by a Retrospect of the Activities of The Keepsake Press from Its Foundation (Keepsake Press, 1975)
- Even Caxton Had His Troubles with the Pickets (1976, reprints to 1984)
- A Force for the Future: The Role of the Police in the Next Ten Years (1976)
- Enoch Powell: Principle in Politics (1979)
- Politics and Printing in Winchester, 1830–1880 (Keepsake Press, 2 editions, 1980)
- Two Conceits for Shakespearians (Keepsake Press, 1984)
- Publishing and Printing at Home (with John B. Easson, 1984)
- A Father’s Imprint: a memory of boyhood, 1989
- Shakespeare Speaks (Keepsake Press, 1989) with Mark Kingston
- The Extraordinary Reign of King Ludd: An Historical Tease (1990); translated into French, Italian and Spanish under titles meaning 'The true history of the last Socialist king' (1993-4)
- A Walk with Mr Gladstone (1991); translated into French as Mr Gladstone et la demi-mondaine (1993)
- Cock of the Walk: A Mid-Victorian Rumpus (1995)

== See also ==
- List of 20th-century writers
- List of English writers
- List of journalists
