= Wes Magee =

British poet and author (1939–2021)

Wesley Leonard Johnston Magee (20 July 1939 – 21 October 2021) was a British poet and children's author.

== Life and career ==
Magee was born in Greenock, Scotland, on 20 July 1939.

Wes taught at Penhill & Park North Junior Schools in Swindon, before taking up a teaching post in Hertfordshire.

He published six collections of poetry for adults, and more than 90 books for children including poetry, fiction, plays, picture books, and anthologies. One of his most well known works is the poem "Windows". Poems for children featured in the Cbeebies series Poetry Pie. Magee performed poetry shows in schools around the UK, as well as Germany, the Isle of Man and Guernsey. He was also a visiting professor at Rollins College, Florida, and Kuwait.

Magee was married to Janet Parkhouse Together they had two children He lived in the hamlet of Thorgill, on the North York Moors. He died on 21 October 2021, at the age of 82.

== Awards and accolades ==
- Urban Gorilla, a collection for adults, won the New Poets Award in 1972.
- The Blackstaff Collection No Man's Land was a recommendation of the Poetry Book Society in 1978.
- The Very Best of Wes Magee, a selection of poems for children, won the Award of the Children's Poetry Bookshelf in 2002.

== Bibliography ==
- Poetry Introduction 2 (Faber & Faber 1970)
- Urban Gorilla (Leeds University Press 1971)
- No Man's Land (Blackstaff Press 1978)
- Oliver, the Daring Birdman (Longmans 1978)
- A Dark Age (Blackstaff Press 1981)
- Morning Break and Other Poems (Cambridge University Press 1989)
- The Witch's Brew and Other Poems (Cambridge University Press 1989)
- Flesh or Money (Littlewood/Arc 1990)
- The Puffin Book of Christmas Poems - Editor (Puffin 1990)
- The Snowgirl and the Snowboy (Ginn 1994)
- The Dogs, the Cats, and the Mice (Ginn 1998)
- The Very Best of Wes Magee (Macmillan 2001)
- The Boneyard Rap and Other Poems (Hodder Wayland 2001)
- The Phantom's Fang-Tastic Show (Oxford University Press 2001)
- The Winterworld War (Barrington Stoke 2002)
- Starfall (The Happy Dragons' Press 2005)

New collections of poems for adults, Joyriding! (Salt Publishing) and A Thorgill Year (The Happy Dragons' Press) were announced in 2009.
