= Monotype (disambiguation) =

A monotype is a print made by drawing or painting on a smooth, non-absorbent surface.

Monotype may also refer to:

- Monotypic taxon, a group of organisms in taxonomy which contains only a single subgroup
- Monotype Imaging (formerly, Monotype Corporation), a typesetting and typeface design company
  - Monotype System, the typesetting machine made by the Monotype Corporation
