= Ahmed Ali (writer) =

Indian writer and diplomat (1910–1994)

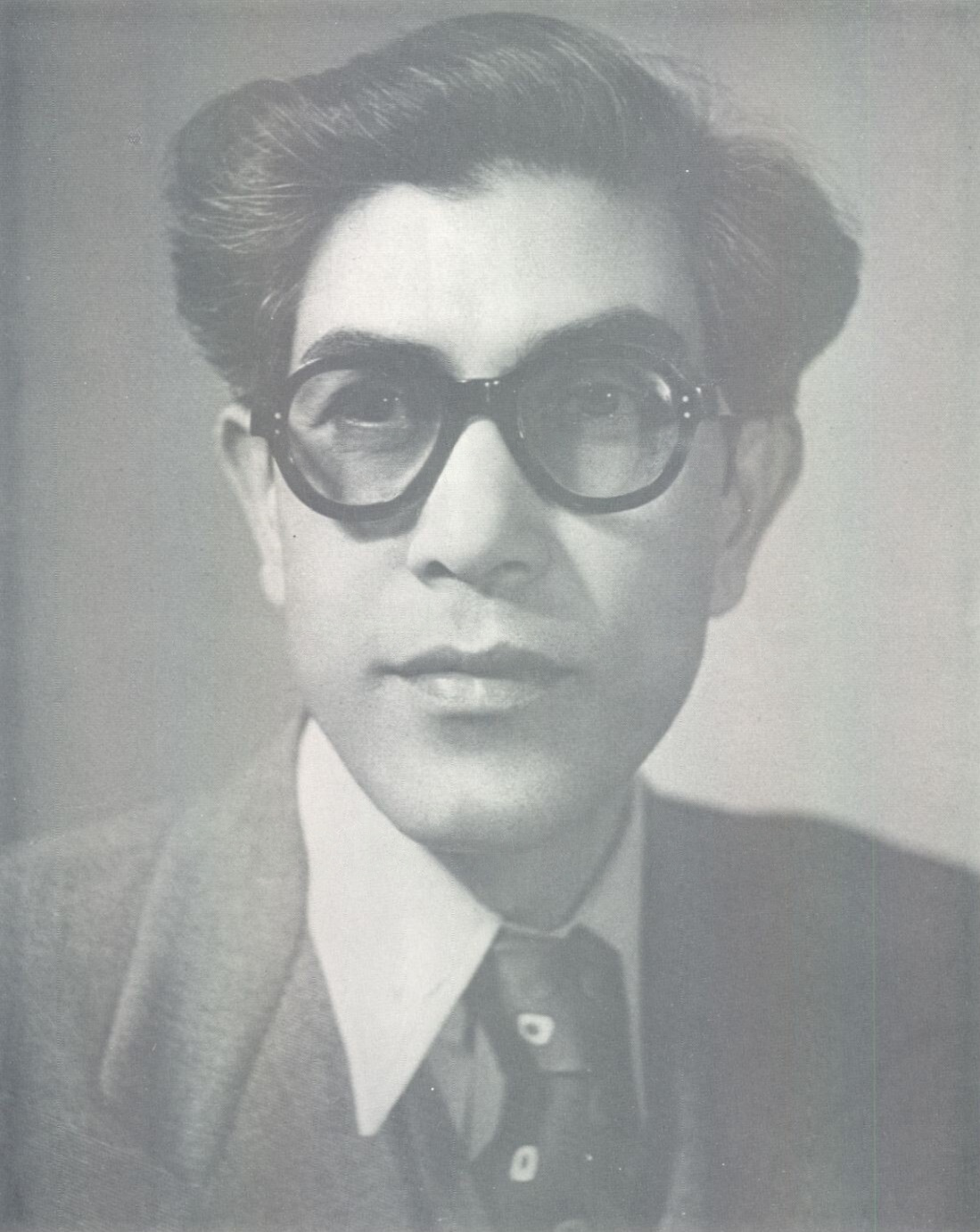
- Born: 1 July 1910; Delhi, British India
- Died: 14 January 1994 (aged 83); Karachi, Pakistan
- Occupation: Writer
- Known for: one of the founders of All-India Progressive Writers Movement

Ahmed Ali (Urdu: احمد علی; 1 July 1910 – 14 January 1994) was a Pakistani novelist, poet, critic, translator, diplomat and scholar. A pioneer of the modern Urdu short story, his works include the short story collections: Angarey (Embers), 1932; Hamari Gali (Our Lane), 1940; Qaid Khana (The Prison), 1942; and Maut Se Pehle (Before Death), 1945. His other writings include Twilight in Delhi (1940), his first novel in the English language.

Muneeza Shamshie has called him "the forefather to all Pakistani English fiction."

== Early life and education ==
Ahmed Ali was born in Delhi, British India, on 1 July 1910. He was descended from families of Islamic scholars on both his paternal and maternal sides, with his paternal lineage tracing directly to Abdul Qadir Gilani, the prominent 12th-century Islamic scholar and Sufi saint. His father Syed Shuja-ud Din was a civil servant in the British administration, being associated with the Punjab Civil Service, and was fond of Persian literature.

Ali began his formal education at the age of 5 by learning Qur'anic recitation. For his higher studies, he graduated in English literature from Aligarh Muslim University and Lucknow University; in the latter "having achieved the highest marks in English in the history of the university."

== Personal life ==
In 1950, Ali married Bilqees Jehan Begum, the daughter of Barrister Rauf Ali. The barrister was also from a prominent Delhi family and a friend of the noted lawyer and independence activist Asaf Ali. Bilqees was a painter and writer who in 1963 translated Ali's novel Twilight in Delhi into Urdu as Dilli ki Ek Sham.

Ali died on 14 January 1994 in Karachi.

== Professional career ==
=== British India ===
From 1932 to 1946, he taught at the leading Indian universities including Allahabad University and his alma mater in Lucknow. He also joined the Bengal Senior Educational Service as professor and head of the English Department at Presidency College, Calcutta (1944–47) and was the BBC's Representative and Director in India during World War II, from 1942 to 1945. Following that, he was the British Council Visiting Professor to Nanjing University, as appointed by the British government of India. In 1948, when he tried to return home after the Partition, K. P. S. Menon (then India's ambassador to China) would not allow it because Ali had not indicated his preferences as a government employee; that is, whether to remain in India or transfer to Pakistan. As a result, he was forced to go to Pakistan.

=== Pakistan ===
In 1948, he moved to Karachi. Later, he was appointed Director of Foreign Publicity for the Pakistan Government. At the behest of Prime Minister Liaquat Ali Khan, he joined the Pakistan Foreign Service in 1950. According to custom, tiles were drawn to determine the country of assignment. Ali's tile was blank, so he chose China and became Pakistan's first envoy to the new People's Republic. By that time he had learnt the Chinese language and wrote a study titled Muslim China in 1949. He established formal diplomatic relations that same year. He also helped to establish Pakistan's embassy in Morocco.

== Literary career ==
=== Author ===
==== Short stories ====
Ali started his literary career at a young age, having published his first English poem in the Aligarh Magazine in 1926 and his first English short-story in 1929, "When the Funeral Was Crossing the Bridge" in the Lucknow University Journal.

He then became a co-founder of the All-India Progressive Writers' Movement along with the writer Sajjad Zaheer who had become well known by the publication of Angaaray (Embers) in 1932. It was a collection of short stories in the Urdu language and was a bitter critique of middle-class Muslim values in British India. In addition to Ali, it included stories by three of his friends; Mahmud al-Zafar, Sajjad Zaheer and Rashid Jahan. This book was later banned by the British Government of India in March 1933. Shortly afterward, Ali and Zafar announced the formation of a "League of Progressive Authors", which was later to expand and become the All-India Progressive Writers' Association. Ali presented his paper "Art Ka Taraqqi-Pasand Nazariya" (A Progressive View of Art) in its inaugural conference in 1936. Later, Ali would distance himself from the movement, which he considered too narrowly focused on Marxism.

==== Novels ====
Ali achieved international fame with his first novel written in English Twilight in Delhi, which was published by the Hogarth Press in London in 1940. This novel, as its title implies, describes the decline of the Muslim aristocracy with the advance of British colonialism in the early 20th century.

=== Translator ===
Al-Quran, A Contemporary Translation (Princeton University Press, Oxford University Press & Akrash Publishing) is his most notable contribution in the field of translation. It was first published in the United States in 1988. Francis Edward Peters called it the best English translation of the Qur'an while Fazlur Rahman Malik said of it that "it aims at doing something new, it seeks to bring out the original rhythms of the Quranic language and the cadences. It also departs from traditional translations in that it gives more refined and differentiated shades of important concepts." Other languages he translated from, apart from Arabic and Urdu, included Indonesian and Chinese.

== Awards and recognition ==
- Elected a Founding Fellow of the Pakistan Academy of Letters in 1979.
- Sitara-i-Imtiaz (Star of Excellence) Award in 1980 by the President of Pakistan
- Conferred an honorary doctorate degree in 1993 by the University of Karachi.
- On 14 January 2005, Pakistan Post issued a commemorative postage stamp in his honour in its 'Men of Letters' series.

== Works ==
=== Novels ===
- Twilight in Delhi (1940)
- Ocean of Night (1964)
- Rats and Diplomats (1986)

=== Plays ===
- The Land of Twilight (1931)
- Break the Chains (1932)

=== Short stories ===
- "When the Funeral Was Crossing the Bridge," in Lucknow University Journal, 1929.
- "Mahavaton Ki Ek Rât," in Humayûn (Lahore), January 1931.
- Angarey (1932). With Rashid Jahan, Mahmuduzzafar and Sajjad Zaheer.
- Sholey (1934)
- "Our Lane," in New Writing (London), 1936.
- Hamari Gali (1940)
- "Morning in Delhi," in New Writing (London), 1940.
- Qaid-khana (1942)
- Maut se Pahle (1945)
- "Before Death," in New Directions 15 (New York), 1956.
- Prima della Morte (1966). Bilingual Italian-Urdu version of Maut se Pahle.
- The Prison-House (1985)

=== Poetry ===
- Purple Gold Mountain (Keepsake Press, 1960)
- First Voices (1965)
- Selected Poems (1988)

=== Literary criticism ===
- "Poetry: A Problem,” in Allahabad University Studies, vol. XI, no. II, 1934.
- Art ka Taraqqî-Pasand Nazariya (1936)
- “Maxim Gorky as a Short-Story Writer," in Lucknow University Journal, 1938.
- Mr. Eliot's Penny-World of Dreams (1941)
- Failure of an Intellect (1968)
- "Illusion and Reality, the Art and Philosophy of Raja Rao," in Journal of Commonwealth Literature, July 1968.
- The Problem of Style and Technique in Ghalib (1969)
- Ghalib: Two Essays (1969). With Alessandro Bausani.
- The Golden Tradition: An Anthology of Urdu Poetry (1973)

=== Translation ===
- The Flaming Earth (1949). An anthology of selected Indonesian poems.
- The Falcon and the Hunted Bird (1950)
- The Bulbul and the Rose: An Anthology of Urdu Poetry (1960)
- Ghalib: Selected Poems (1969)
- al-Qur’ân: A Contemporary Translation (1988)
- The Call of the Trumpet (unpublished). An anthology of modern Chinese poetry
