= Sajjad Zaheer =

Indian Marxist writer (1899–1973)

- سجاد ظهیر
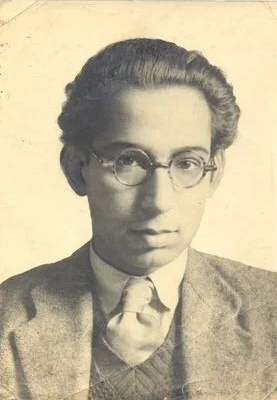
- Born: 5 November 1905; Lucknow, United Provinces of Agra and Oudh, British India
- Died: 13 September 1973 (aged 67); Alma Ata, Kazakh SSR, Soviet Union
- Education: Oxford University; Lincoln's Inn
- Occupations: Marxist ideologue, Urdu writer and poet
- Political party: Communist Party of India
- Spouse: Razia Sajjad Zaheer
- Children: 4, including Nadira Babbar and Noor Zaheer
- Father: Syed Wazir Hasan
- Awards: Soviet Land Nehru Award
- Writing career
- Genres: Ghazal, Prose
- Notable works: Angarey; London Ki Ek Raat
- Movements: Progressive Writers' Movement; Afro-Asian Writers' Movement

Syed Sajjad Zaheer (5 November 1905 – 13 September 1973) was an Indian Urdu-language writer, Marxist ideologue, radical revolutionary and a member of the Communist Party of India.

He established the All India Progressive Writers' Association after the short story collection Angarey (Embers, 1932) was banned by the British Indian government. He then went on to study law at Lincoln's Inn in London and published the memoir London Ki Ek Raat (1935) based on his experience. He later served as the editor of several Communist Party of India newspapers. After the partition of India, he moved to the newly created Pakistan and became one of the founding members of the Communist Party of Pakistan but was arrested in the alleged Rawalpindi conspiracy case and returned to India to continue working in cultural activities organized by the Communist Party of India.

== Early life and education ==
Zaheer was born in Lucknow in 1905 and was the fourth son of Syed Wazir Hasan, a judge at the High Court of Judicature at Allahabad. He got his BA degree in English literature from the University of Lucknow in 1924. He then left for New College, Oxford for further studies. In his final year at Oxford, he contracted tuberculosis and was sent to a sanatorium in Switzerland. On returning to England, he was influenced by the communist leader Shapurji Saklatvala and joined the Oxford Majlis. He attended the second Congress of the League Against Imperialism held in Frankfurt, where he met influential leaders like Viren Chattopadhyay, Saumyendranath Tagore, N. M. Jaisoorya and Raja Mahendra Pratap. He also started the newspaper Bharat in 1930 in England. He graduated from Oxford University with a degree in BA in 1931. After finishing his studies at Oxford he travelled through Germany, Italy, Denmark and Austria on his journey back to India in 1932.

In December 1932, Zaheer along with a group of friends published his first book Angarey. The book was met with outrage from both the religious and civil authorities in British India and was subsequently banned by the government. Following the uproar due to the release of Angarey, he was sent to London by his father in March 1933 to study law at Lincoln's Inn.

== Political career ==
In 1935, he and novelist Mulk Raj Anand went to Paris to attend the International Congress for Defense of Culture organised by André Gide. Influenced by the conference he established the Indian Progressive Writers' Association (AIPWA) in London. The first conference of the association was held on 9 and 10 April 1936. After returning to India, he organised the first conference of the Progressive Writers' Association in Lucknow on 9 April 1936, and started working as its general secretary. He along with Sohan Singh Josh started the first Marxist journal in Urdu, Chingari, in Saharanpur.

He became Uttar Pradesh state secretary of the Communist Party of India (CPI) as well as a member of the working committee of the Indian National Congress in 1936. He was nominated in charge of the Delhi branch of the CPI in 1939 and was jailed for two years during the World War II for opposing Indian participation in it. After his release in 1942, he became the editor of the CPI newspaper Qaumi Jung (People's War) and Naya Zamana (New Age) in Bombay. He also helped to organize the Indian People's Theatre Association (IPTA) and the All India Kisan Sabha(AIKS).

After the partition of India, Sajjad Zaheer along with Sibte Hasan and Mian Iftekhar-ud-Din started the Communist Party of Pakistan. They were appointed Secretary General of the party. In 1951, he was arrested in the Rawalpindi conspiracy case along with Faiz Ahmed Faiz. He remained in jail for four years and upon release was given Indian citizenship by Jawaharlal Nehru.

While in India he continued to work in cultural activities organized by the Communist Party of India. He revived the All India Progressive Writers' Association, became secretary of the Indian chapter of the Afro-Asian Writers' Association, and also worked as editor of Awami Daur (People's Era) and the daily Hayat.

He died in 1973 while attending a literary conference in Alma Ata, Kazakhstan.

== Literary career ==
Zaheer started his literary career with a collection of short stories, Angarey (embers) in 1932. It had stories by Sajjad Zaheer, Ahmed Ali, Rashid Jahan and Mahmud-uz-Zafar. It was banned in 1933 by the British government of India "for hurting the religious susceptibilities of a section of the community." This gave rise to the All-India Progressive Writers' Movement and Association of which both Sajjad Zaheer and Ahmed Ali were co-founders.

In 1935 he wrote a novel called London Ki Ek Raat (A Night in London) based on his experience of London. In 1944 a collection of letters to his wife from the prisons of Lucknow and Allahabad was published as Nuqush-e-Zindan. He also wrote Roshnai (1956), a history-cum-memoir of the early days of the progressive movement, Zikr-e-Hafiz (1956), a critical look at the works of the Persian poet Hafiz (1956), and a collection of poems in vers libre called Pighla Neelam (1964).

In addition, Zaheer also served as the editor of several papers and magazines throughout his career including Bharat, Chingari, Qaumi Jung, Naya Zamana, Awami Daur and Hayat. He was also an avid translator, producing Urdu versions of Tagore's Gora, Voltaire's Candide and Shakespeare's Othello.

== Personal life ==
Sajjad and his wife Razia Sajjad Zaheer had four daughters, including Naseem Bhatia, who holds a PhD in history (ancient history) from a Russian university, actress Nadira Babbar and writer Noor Zaheer.

He was a Muslim and is buried in the Jamia Nagar cemetery of Jamia Millia Islamia in New Delhi.

== Published writings ==
The published works of Zaheer include.

- Angarey (Nizami Press, Lucknow, 1932)
- Beemaar (Jamia Press, Delhi)
- London Ki Ek Raat (Halqaye-e-Adab, Lucknow, 1935)
- Urdu, Hindi, Hindustani (Kutab Publishers, Bombay, 1947)
- Nuqush-e-Zindan (Maktaba Shahrah, Dahrah, Delhi, 1951)
- Zikr-e-Hafiz (Anjuman-i Taraqqi-i Urdu, Aligarh, 1956)
- Roshnai (Maktaba Urdu, Lahore, 1956)
- Pighla Nilam (Nai Roshani Prakashan, Delhi, 1964)
- Meri Suno (Star Publishers, Delhi, 1967)
- Mazzamein-e-Sajjad Zaheer (published posthumously by the UP Urdu Academy, Lucknow, 1979)
- A translation of Shakespeare's Othello
- A translation of Voltaire's Candide
- A translation of Tagore's Gora
- A translation of Gibran's The Prophet

== Cited sources ==
- Coppola, Carlo (1981). "The Angare Group: The Enfants Terribles of Urdu Literature". Annual of Urdu Studies. 1: 57–69.
- Jalil, Rakhshanda (2014). Liking Progress, Loving Change: A Literary History of the Progressive Writers' Movement in Urdu. Oxford University Press. ISBN 978-0-19-809673-3.
