= Karen Gershon =

German-British writer and poet

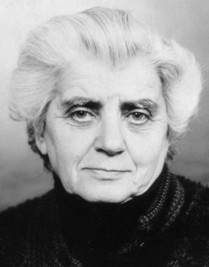
Karen Gershon

Karen Gershon, born Kaethe Loewenthal (29 August 1923 – 24 March 1993) was a German-born British writer and poet. She escaped to Britain in December 1938.

Her book We came as Children: A Collective Autobiography uses a number of testimonies of kindertransport to construct a single account.

One of her best-known poems, I was not there, describes her feelings of guilt at not being there when her parents were murdered by the Nazis.

== Works ==
=== Poetry ===
- The Relentless Year New Poets 1959, Eyre & Spottiswoode 1960
- Selected Poems Gollancz 1966 (published in the United States by Harcourt Brace & World in 1967)
- Legacies and Encounters Gollancz 1972
- My Daughters, My Sisters Gollancz 1975
- Coming Back from Babylon Gollancz 1979
- Collected Poems Macmillan, Papermac 1990
- Grace Notes (with drawings by Stella Tripp), Happy Dragons Press, 2002

=== Non-Fiction ===
- We came as children (German: Wir kamen als Kinder) London, Gollancz 1966, republished Macmillan, Papermac 1989 (published in the US by Harcourt Brace & World in 1967 and in Germany by Alibaba Verlag in 1988)
- Postscript: A Collective Account of the Lives of Jews in West Germany Since the Second World War Gollancz 1969

=== Fiction ===
- Burn Helen Harvester Press 1980
- The Bread of Exile Gollancz 1985
- The Fifth Generation (German: Die Fünfte Generation) Gollancz 1987 (published in Germany Alibaba Verlag 1988)

=== Other ===
- A Tempered Wind (Autobiography, Vol.2, 1938–1943) Northwestern University Press 2009
- A Lesser Child (German: Das Unterkind) (Autobiography, Vol.1) Peter Owen 1993 (published in Germany Rowohlt 1992)
- Only Meant to Comfort (German: Mich nur zu trösten bestimmt) Karin Fischer, Edition Roter Stein 2000 (in Germany)

== Sources ==
- Peter Lawson (2006): Anglo-Jewish Poetry from Isaac Rosenberg to Elaine Feinstein. Pub. Vallentine Mitchell.
- J. M. Ritchie, German-speaking Exiles in Great Britain, Rodopi, Amsterdam, 2001, ISBN 90-420-1537-3.
- Literary estate of Karen Gershon (see External Links).
